= Balamory series 2 =

2003 Scottish television season

Balamory
- Series 2
- No. of episodes: 63

Release
- Original network: CBeebies
- Original release: 7 April – 2 July 2003

Series chronology
- ← Previous; Series 1 Next → Series 3

The second series of the live-action children's programme Balamory began airing in the United Kingdom on CBeebies on 7 April 2003 and finished on 2 July 2003.

== Cast ==
=== Main characters ===
- Julie Wilson Nimmo as Miss Hoolie
- Andrew Agnew as PC Plum
- Mary Riggans as Suzie Sweet
- Kim Tserkezie as Penny Pocket
- Juliet Cadzow as Edie McCredie
- Buki Akib and Kasia Haddad as Josie Jump
- Miles Jupp as Archie
- Rodd Christensen as Spencer

Kasia replaces Buki as Josie Jump in the season finale, and reprises the role in series 3 and 4.

== Episodes ==
No. in series	Title	Directed by	Written by	Original release date
1	"The Lost Letter"	Jaqui McAlpine	Johanna Hall	7 April 2003
Spencer finds out Miss Hoolie didn't get the invitation to a surprise party for herself.
2	"Family Meal"	Shiona McCubbin	Wayne Jackman	8 April 2003
Archie has been invited over for a family meal at Amber's house, but the trouble is that he has inventor's block. What will he do?
3	"The Hobby Horse"	Jaqui McAlpine	Davey Moore	9 April 2003
Archie presents Miss Hoolie with a pen tree made from coat hangers to keep her pens tidy.
4	"Windy Day"	Jaqui McAlpine	Peter Hynes	14 April 2003
PC Plum's hat blows away, and he tries to find alternatives.
5	"Living Statue"	Michael Hines	Jane Kemp & Claire Walters	11 April 2003
Penny Pocket visits the nursery to tell Miss Hoolie that Suzie Sweet has decided to encourage people to recycle. But soon, she and Edie McCredie see a mysterious burglar in the shop. What are they going to do?
6	"Fun Run"	Uncredited	Jill Brett	10 April 2003
There is a Fun Run happening in Balamory today, and Josie Jump can't take part unless she finds somebody else to start the race. But who can help Josie out?
7	"Car Boot Sale"	Michael Hines	Nigel Crowle	15 April 2003
PC Plum's office is cluttered with stuff he wants to throw away but Miss Hoolie tells him to take them to a car boot sale and use them as items for anyone to buy them.
8	"Chinese Festival"	Emma Farrell	Kath Yelland	16 April 2003
The residents of the island celebrate Chinese New Year, complete with a lion dance.
9	"The Waiter"	Jaqui McAlpine	Penny Lloyd	17 April 2003
Suzie is nervous about helping out at her cousin's cafe on the mainland. It seems there is so much to do! How will she remember what everyone has ordered?
10	"Bun Fest"	Emma Farrell	Davey Moore	18 April 2003
Archie isn't interested in helping out at the Balamory Bun Festival, but he definitely wants to sample some of the buns.
11	"Noises in the Night"	Jaqui McAlpine	Davey Moore	21 April 2003
Spencer wants to play a game with the children about different noises in the night, but he doesn't know which noises to use. Who can help him out?
12	"The Plumber"	Jaqui McAlpine	Fiona McGarry	22 April 2003
Edie helps a friend fit a new toilet in the bathroom of her friend's house. The problem is that she only knows a little about toilets.
13	"Litter Bug"	Michael Hines	Johanna Hall	23 April 2003
Suzie and Penny are unhappy about the complaints of litter near their shop.
14	"Musical Houses"	Uncredited	Keith Brumpton	24 April 2003
Suzie Sweet has been eating her dinner in the shop and doing her ironing in the cafe. How can Penny Pocket get her to do things in the right place?
15	"Snow"	Shiona McCubbin	Wayne Jackman	25 April 2003
It is snowing, and PC Plum is worried about one of his friends who doesn't get out much. He wants to find a way to bring the winter magic to her house.
16	"Shops"	Emma Farrell	Wayne Jackman	28 April 2003
Josie Jump wants to play shops with the children at the nursery, but who can help her make it fun?
17	"Daffodil Tea Party"	Jaqui McAlpine	Peter Hynes	29 April 2003
Miss Hoolie organises a daffodil tea party for the children's parents at the nursery.
18	"The Sing Along Machine"	Shiona McCubbin	Jill Brett	30 April 2003
A loud booming voice is keeping Balamory residents awake, including Miss Hoolie. PC Plum is on the case, and finds out it is coming from Archie's newest invention – a noisy music machine. PC Plum must find a way to put it to good use.
19	"Bubbles"	Emma Farrell	Davey Moore	1 May 2003
Josie teaches the children to play with bubbles.
20	"Steam Train"	Michael Hines	Wayne Jackman	2 May 2003
PC Plum has promised to take Miss Hoolie out for the day, but he has double-booked himself, as he has also promised to go on a fishing trip with Spencer on the same day.
21	"Bassoon"	Shiona McCubbin	Penny Lloyd	5 May 2003
The nursery children are eagerly awaiting a visit from a bassoon player. Archie decides to come along too, and he invents a musical instrument to play along with her.
22	"Kitten"	Jaqui McAlpine	Johanna Hall	6 May 2003
Edie is very sad because her friend's cat has died. Spencer and PC Plum find ways to cheer her up.
23	"Jennifer"	Jaqui McAlpine	Penny Lloyd	7 May 2003
The children want to play in the garden, but there is no rabbit run for Jennifer the rabbit. Edie sets out to find the materials to make one.
24	"Play Ground"	Uncredited	Penny Lloyd	8 May 2003
Suzie and Penny have bought some new games for the shop, but they don't know how to play them.
25	"Gardening"	Michael Hines	Davey Moore	9 May 2003
It's a sunny day, so the children help in Mrs. Reilly's garden.
26	"Disco"	Emma Farrell	Kath Yelland	12 May 2003
Miss Hoolie asks PC Plum to organise a disco for the children, but he doesn't know much about music.
27	"Busy Cafe"	Emma Farrell	Penny Lloyd	13 May 2003
Suzie rushes back and forth and gets very tired.
28	"Back to Front"	Jaqui McAlpine	Alan Moss	14 May 2003
Penny's wheelchair needs mending, so Edie pumps the wheel up for her before the activity lesson at the Nursery.
29	"Washing"	Emma Farrell	Claire Walters & Jane Kemp	15 May 2003
Everyone is upset at Spencer for messing things up, to which he finds out that he has forgotten to wash his hands and is covering everything he touches in green paint.
30	"The Sizeometer"	Jaqui McAlpine	Simon Jowett	16 May 2003
Archie's new invention doesn't seem to impress anyone.
31	"Sneeze"	Shiona McCubbin	Penny Lloyd	19 May 2003
Archie has a problem where cannot stop sneezing.
32	"The Story Blanket"	Emma Farrell	Penny Lloyd	20 May 2003
Josie wants to tell a story for the nursery children as they cannot go outside due to the rain, but just ends up making a big mess instead.
33	"Pancake Party"	Jaqui McAlpine	Wayne Jackman	21 May 2003
It's pancake day in the nursery and PC Plum keeps losing his eggs.
34	"Exercise"	Shiona McCubbin	Davey Moore	22 May 2003
Josie Jump's jumping classes aren't as popular as they used to be and wants to find a sort of gimmick, gizmo or gadget to get more people involved. Who in Balamory will help her?
35	"Dolls Hospital"	Uncredited	Penny Lloyd	23 May 2003
Miss Hoolie has been asked to look after Caitlin's doll, but Edie accidentally sits on the doll and breaks it. What can she do?
36	"Nursery Safari"	Jaqui McAlpine	Wayne Jackman	26 May 2003
Edie McCredie wants to go on safari in Balamory, but it sounds too much of a challenge. Can PC Plum manage this?
37	"Symbols and Signs"	Jaqui McAlpine	Duncan Fisher	27 May 2003
Archie wants to take the nursery children on a tour of the island to see how many street signs they can spot, but it's too far for them to walk.
38	"The Hat Story"	Jaqui McAlpine	Wayne Jackman	28 May 2003
Penny uses the hats in Edie's lost and found box to tell the children a story about different people who might wear them.
39	"Grandmothers Footsteps"	Emma Farrell	Claire Walters & Jane Kemp	29 May 2003
PC Plum loves to watch animals, but he keeps scaring them away. Spencer has offered to help him, but how?
40	"Sheep Dog"	Shiona McCubbin	Duncan Fisher	30 May 2003
PC Plum wants to bring in Sandy the sheepdog in to show the children, but she is too busy with work on the farm. What can PC Plum do?
41	"Leaves"	Shiona McCubbin	Penny Lloyd	2 June 2003
Spencer helps out a neighbour to rake leaves, but he doesn't know what to do with them all.
42	"Animal Hospital"	Michael Hines	Alan Moss	3 June 2003
When Edie finds a hedgehog, she tries to find a way to look after it but has trouble doing so.
43	"Fun Fair"	Emma Farrell	Polly Kelly	4 June 2003
Archie needs to go to the funfair to collect sugar for the candy floss stall, but he is scared of the rides there.
44	"Likes and Don't Likes"	Uncredited	Alan Moss	5 June 2003
Edie tries to buy a Spice Girls CD from Suzie and Penny's, but they're all sold out. When she doesn't get anything else she's looking for, Josie helps her help Suzie and Penny find out what everyone else likes and doesn't like.
45	"Magic"	Shiona McCubbin	Wayne Jackman	6 June 2003
Josie wants to tell the children a story about a magician, but she needs a magic box and a magic trick. What will she do?
46	"Buddies"	Emma Farrell	Pam Wardell	9 June 2003
Spencer wants to take the nursery children to visit their buddies at the primary school, but who will tell him where to go?
47	"The Memory Tree"	Uncredited	Peter Hynes	10 June 2003
Edie has a box of keepsakes from her woodland walks but doesn't know what to do with them.
48	"Face Painting"	Jaqui McAlpine	Wayne Jackman	11 June 2003
At the Balamory bazaar, Edie is supposed to run the face painting stall, but she doesn't know how to do it.
49	"Ways to Travel"	Uncredited	Duncan Fisher	12 June 2003
Josie promises to tell the children stories about exciting ways to travel – but she has only ever been on the ferry.
50	"Gymnastics"	Emma Farrell	Wayne Jackman	13 June 2003
Suzie has a new hobby – juggling and stilt walking, and is causing trouble in the shop. Who can stop the chaos?
51	"Big City"	Shiona McCubbin	Simon Jowett	16 June 2003
Archie wants to take his nephew Christopher to the Science Centre in the Big City but is unsure what it's like to him.
52	"Doctors & Nurses"	Jaqui McAlpine	Davey Moore	17 June 2003
The nursery children are playing a hospital game and Miss Hoolie asks Archie to invent something to play with, something that doctors and nurses use.
53	"The Story Pole"	Shiona McCubbin	Keith Brumpton	18 June 2003
Spencer wants to tell the children the story of Princess Sally, but he can't remember how the story goes.
54	"Tasty"	Michael Hines	Penny Lloyd	19 June 2003
The children bake some biscuits for PC Plum's tasting session.
55	"Cycling Story"	Emma Farrell	Johanna Hall	20 June 2003
Josie Jump and Miss Hoolie are on a bicycle ride today, but Josie doesn't know the rules of the road. Luckily, there's someone in Balamory who can help her.
56	"Ice Skating"	Shiona McCubbin	Wayne Jackman	23 June 2003
Josie is going to the mainland to go ice-skating and wants to borrow a CD to listen to while skating.
57	"Indian Wedding"	Uncredited	Wayne Jackman	24 June 2003
Balamory is in celebration mode as Penny and Suzie help organise an Indian wedding, but Suzie gets the arrangements muddled up! Will things be fixed in time?
58	"Pirate Party"	Shiona McCubbin	Kath Yelland	25 June 2003
Today is Miss Hoolie's birthday and PC Plum and Spencer organise a surprise party for her.
59	"Air Guitar"	Shiona McCubbin	Alan Moss	26 June 2003
Spencer wants to play his guitar for the nursery children.
60	"Paddle Steamer"	Michael Hines	Wayne Jackman	27 June 2003
The paddle steamer runs out of tickets. Edie comes to the rescue by using old raffle tickets.
61	"Jungle"	Emma Farrell	Penny Lloyd	30 June 2003
PC Plum helps Spencer find his guitar.
62	"Sailing"	Emma Farrell	Penny Lloyd	1 July 2003
PC Plum is in a muddle, and will he be able to complete his jobs in time before he goes out sailing with Miss Hoolie?
63	"The Snow Flake Fairy"	Uncredited	Brian Jameson	2 July 2003
It's time for the winter, but Archie is feeling a bit glum after being ill with flu. Who will wipe away his frowns and bring back his smiles in time for the party?
