= Balamory series 4 =

2005 Scottish television season

Balamory
- Series 4
- No. of episodes: 64 (including 1 Christmas special)

Release
- Original network: CBeebies
- Original release: 4 April – 7 November 2005

Series chronology
- ← Previous; Series 3 Next → Series 5

The fourth series of the live-action children's programme Balamory began airing in the United Kingdom on CBeebies on 4 April 2005 and finished on 7 November 2005.

== Cast ==
=== Main characters ===
- Julie Wilson Nimmo as Miss Hoolie
- Andrew Agnew as PC Plum
- Mary Riggans as Suzie Sweet
- Kim Tserkezie as Penny Pocket
- Juliet Cadzow as Edie McCredie
- Kasia Haddad as Josie Jump
- Miles Jupp as Archie
- Rodd Christensen as Spencer

== Episodes ==
No. in series	Title	Directed by	Written by	Original release date
1	"Auntie's Bloomers"	Martin Burt	Wayne Jackman	4 April 2005
Archie's kilt is a bit draughty.
2	"The Eagle Flies"	Martin Burt	Wayne Jackman	5 April 2005
PC Plum offers to get a photograph of an eagle for Miss Hoolie to show the children at the nursery.
3	"Plum Abroad"	Martin Burt	Wayne Jackman	6 April 2005
PC Plum goes on holiday.
4	"The Game Show"	Uncredited	Wayne Jackman	7 April 2005
Balamory has been asked to make up a team for the television game show Do The Job. PC Plum thinks it will be easy to organise.
5	"The Wedding"	Martin Burt	Wayne Jackman	8 April 2005
Katie and Roddy are getting married and PC Plum is the best man. Archie drives them to Abbey Island and Edie records the wedding, but Archie's car soon breaks down outside the police station.
6	"Woodwork"	Michael Hines	Wayne Jackman	11 April 2005
Spencer teaches Edie how to carve a wooden marionette puppet, similar to Pinocchio.
7	"The Time Machine"	Jaqui McAlpine	Wayne Jackman	12 April 2005
Archie tries to invent a time machine to help teach the children about olden days.
8	"Signing"	Martin Burt	Wayne Mackman	13 April 2005
PC Plum takes the children at the Nursery on a nature walk, so he needs to find a new way to communicate to keep everyone quiet.
9	"The Falkirk Wheel"	Jaqui McAlpine	Peter Hynes	14 April 2005
Archie makes an indoor canal so the children can sail boats on it.
10	"The Snowman"	Shiona McCubbin	Wayne Jackman	15 April 2005
It's a snowy day in Balamory and Miss Hoolie plans to visit the McLeod family, but Josie comes in to the cafe to tell Miss Hoolie that Christopher has a cold. The two think up something to make to cheer him up.
11	"Lobster Fishing"	Paul Holmes	Wayne Jackman	18 April 2005
Miss Hoolie plays a game of hunt the thimble with the children, which leads to Josie organising an unusual treasure hunt with PC Plum and a lobster fisherman.
12	"The Portrait Gallery"	Martin Burt	Wayne Jackman	19 April 2005
Archie and Spencer take the nursery children on a trip to the Balamory Art Museum.
13	"The Slide Projector"	Uncredited	Wayne Jackman	20 April 2005
PC Plum is very keen to give a lecture on the history of the bicycle, but who can make his lecture an exciting event for all?
14	"Harvest"	Michael Hines	Wayne Jackman	21 April 2005
Edie helps the children celebrate the harvest.
15	"Truck Parade"	Jaqui McAlpine	Wayne Jackman	22 April 2005
It is a play day in Balamory and a trip is organised to the mainland to see a big truck parade.
16	"Big Cats"	Paul Holmes	Wayne Jackman	25 April 2005
Miss Hoolie's cat proves less than co-operative when Spencer tries to paint him for the children.
17	"The Orchestra"	Martin Burt	Wayne Jackman	26 April 2005
Suzie needs help learning to play the cymbals in the orchestra.
18	"How Far"	Martin Burt	Wayne Jackman	27 April 2005
Archie wonders who will be able to put his fabulous new measuring invention to good use.
19	"The Map"	Jaqui McAlpine	Wayne Jackman	28 April 2005
Edie takes the children on a tour around the island, but how can she keep everyone interested as she drives? It's not as easy as it looks!
20	"I Went To School One Morning"	Martin Burt	Wayne Jackman	29 April 2005
It's a play day, and having a picnic at the top of Balamory hill sounds like fun, but getting there could be a bit of a problem. How will they do it?
21	"The Yoghurt Pot Bird"	Jaqui McAlpine	Wayne Jackman	2 May 2005
Suzie gets in a muddle as she tries to help Edie teach the children about birds-of-paradise.
22	"The Allotment"	Paul Holmes	Penny Lloyd	3 May 2005
Josie does some gardening, but can't find any vegetables.
23	"Too Much of a Good Thing"	Jaqui McAlpine	Wayne Jackman	4 May 2005
Miss Hoolie has got too many tin foil trays in her cupboard. When Archie is unable to find a use for them all, who will come to the rescue?
24	"Continental Shopping"	Martin Burt	Wayne Jackman	5 May 2005
A new product range is introduced in Pocket 'n' Sweet, but will it prove a success?
25	"Carnival"	Uncredited	Wayne Jackman	6 May 2005
There is a carnival in the big city on the mainland, but what will Miss Hoolie wear?
26	"Slippy"	Martin Burt	Wayne Jackman	9 May 2005
The snow makes everything slippery; Spencer visits Archie to make a sledge.
27	"The Optician"	Martin Burt	Wayne Jackman	10 May 2005
Archie takes a memorable trip to the optician.
28	"Bonjour"	Michael Hines	Davey Moore	11 May 2005
Miss Hoolie gets help from her friend, Philippe, teaching the children French. Spencer borrows some bunting for the Nursery, but when he goes to the shop, he realises that Philippe's shopping list is all in French. Who can help him translate?
29	"Worried Plum"	Martin Burt	Wayne Jackman	12 May 2005
PC Plum has a day of worrying about everything, so who can make him a little less glum?
30	"Feeling at Home"	Jaqui McAlpine	Johanna Hall	13 May 2005
It is a play day, and Miss Hoolie has friends staying with her, so she organises a special picnic for them to feel at home.
31	"Musical Boats"	Jaqui McAlpine	Kath Yelland	16 May 2005
Edie has a cold and has to stay at home, but an annoying noise outside stops her from getting any peace.
32	"Shapes and Patterns"	Michael Hines	Davey Moore	17 May 2005
Edie has a brilliant day out at the mosque with Spencer and the children.
33	"Butterflies"	Martin Burt	Peter Hynes	18 May 2005
Josie wants to teach the children a butterfly dance, and Edie suggests they try to catch a butterfly with butterfly nets.
34	"The Giggler"	Jaqui McAlpine	Davey Moore	19 May 2005
Granny McLeod comes to visit the children at the nursery, and keeps them laughing.
35	"Highland Games"	Jaqui McAlpine	David MacLennan	20 May 2005
Archie asks Spencer to make some leaflets for the Balamory Highland Games.
36	"Colour Surprise Day"	Martin Burt	Davey Moore	23 May 2005
Archie invents a special 'colour surprise' machine to the delight of the children at the nursery.
37	"Video Guide"	Michael Hines	Wayne Jackman	24 May 2005
The shop has a lot of visitors, all with questions about the island, so Suzie and Penny must come up with a way of providing all the answers.
38	"Shadows"	Martin Burt	Wayne Jackman	25 May 2005
Josie Jump asks PC Plum to investigate when things go bump in the night during a windy spell.
39	"Holiday Snaps"	Martin Burt	Wayne Jackman	26 May 2005
Josie returns from holiday with photos from her travels and comes up with an idea for a game of Snap. So Josie goes to see Edie.
40	"Roller Skates"	Martin Burt	Wayne Jackman	27 May 2005
Spencer tries to ride around Balamory in roller skates, so Miss Hoolie helps him. He goes to Miss Hoolie's house to pick up her roller skates.
41	"The Loch Bala Monster"	Jaqui McAlpine	Davey Moore	30 May 2005
Spencer wants to paint a picture of the Loch Bala Monster but how will he find it?
42	"Island in the Sun"	Paul Holmes	Wayne Jackman	31 May 2005
It's a snowy day in Balamory, so PC Plum banishes the winter blues by relieving his summer holiday.
43	"Moving House"	Michael Hines	Penny Lloyd	1 June 2005
Penny Pocket shows how to organise a house move, but will everything work out?
44	"The Piano"	Jaqui McAlpine	Wayne Jackman	2 June 2005
Edie has just returned from a holiday in Paris, and is about to show the video she recorded of her holiday to the children, but she soon accidentally deletes the sound. What can she do?
45	"Wheelie Day"	Jaqui McAlpine	Penny Lloyd	3 June 2005
Josie uses a talking device to help people hear her on Wheelie Day, but gets a bit muddled.
46	"Snap"	Martin Burt	Jane Kemp & Claire Walters	6 June 2005
Josie wants to play a quiet game of playing cards with the children, but when she goes to borrow a pack of cards from Edie, she finds out that some of the cards are missing.
47	"Mix Up"	Jaqui McAlpine	Peter Hynes	7 June 2005
Penny reorganises the shop, but ends up causing problems with all the mix-ups she's making.
48	"Phone Frazzled"	Uncredited	Wayne Jackman	8 June 2005
Suzie has a new mobile phone, which leads to some problems. The phone becomes more important than the people around her!
49	"Nature Symphony"	Paul Holmes	Penny Lloyd	9 June 2005
It's raining, so PC Plum has to cancel a nature walk. Instead, he comes up with another way of helping the children enjoy the magic of nature.
50	"The Sniff Along"	Martin Burt	Wayne Jackman	10 June 2005
Archie is looking after Shannon and Christopher, but he has some shopping to do.
51	"Trip to the Moon"	Jaqui McAlpine	Penny Lloyd	13 June 2005
Edie wants to take the children on a trip to the Moon.
52	"Hot Sun"	Jaqui McAlpine	Brian Ross	14 June 2005
It's a very hot day, so Archie invents a machine to keep everybody cool, but Edie has other plans.
53	"Wrong End of the Stick"	Paul Holmes	Brian Jameson	15 June 2005
PC Plum gets the wrong end of the stick.
54	"Ballroom Dancing"	Martin Burt	Tracey Hammett	16 June 2005
Josie Jump decides to teach ballroom dancing in her dance class, but it causes problems.
55	"Sand Sculpture Festival"	Michael Hines	Penny Lloyd	17 June 2005
There is a sand sculpture festival at the beach and Spencer is organising it.
56	"Oil Platform"	Martin Burt	Wayne Jackman	20 June 2005
PC Plum informs Miss Hoolie that Christopher's uncle cannot come to his birthday party because he is away at sea on an oil rig. PC Plum must find a way to help Christopher out.
57	"Plum the Musical"	Paul Holmes	Wayne Jackman	21 June 2005
Josie is organising a musical, but which famous resident of Balamory will feature in it?
58	"The Cinema"	Martin Burt	Wayne Jackman	22 June 2005
When Edie and Spencer arrive home from a holiday in Spain, everyone wants to see Edie's latest video from their travels. So many people are keen to see it and that is where the problems start.
59	"Fingal's Cave"	Paul Holmes	Penny Lloyd	23 June 2005
Miss Hoolie and Archie visit Fingal's cave, but is Archie fully prepared for the trip?
60	"The Prize"	Paul Holmes	Peter Hynes	24 June 2005
PC Plum is in charge of running the Balamory Yacht Race.
61	"Nuts"	Uncredited	Wayne Jackman	27 June 2005
Someone or something is stealing all of the nuts from the bird table for all the birds residing at the nursery.
62	"Hello Day"	Michael Hines	Davey Moore	28 June 2005
It's Hello Day at the nursery, and Suzie is annoyed because Penny has a new stereo. As a result, she ignores customers who want to buy something.
63	"The Mountie"	Martin Burt	Wayne Jackman	29 June 2005
PC Plum has a policeman visiting from Canada, but wonders how he can take the Mountie on patrol.
64	"Seeking Santa"	Uncredited	Brian Jameson	7 November 2005
Miss Hoolie is holding a Christmas party at the nursery and asks PC Plum to dress up as Santa. However, they realise that while a pretend Santa is good at handing out Santa wishes, he's not the real Santa. It's up to Suzie and Penny to make the impossible possible.: This episode was released exclusively on DVD and VHS alongside an extended version of the series 2 episode "The Snowflake Fairy".
