= Balamory series 1 =

2002 Scottish television season

Balamory
- Series 1
- No. of episodes: 64

Release
- Original network: CBeebies
- Original release: 2 September – 25 December 2002

Series chronology
- Next → Series 2

The first series of the live-action children's programme Balamory began airing in the United Kingdom on CBeebies on 2 September 2002 and finished on 25 December 2002.

== Cast ==
=== Main characters ===
- Julie Wilson Nimmo as Miss Hoolie
- Andrew Agnew as PC Plum
- Mary Riggans as Suzie Sweet
- Kim Tserkezie as Penny Pocket
- Juliet Cadzow as Edie McCredie
- Buki Akib as Josie Jump
- Miles Jupp as Archie
- Rodd Christensen as Spencer

== Episodes ==
No. in series	Title	Directed by	Written by	Original release date
1	"Fish Supper"	Yvonne Jennings	Kath Yelland	2 September 2002
Miss Hoolie holds a fish supper for the children's grandparents. She asks Spencer to buy some fish.
2	"The Power Cut"	Yvonne Jennings	Wayne Jackman	3 September 2002
There is no electricity in the nursery, so Archie invents a TV that doesn't use power.
3	"I Spy"	Jaqui McAlpine	Davey Moore	4 September 2002
Edie always takes the children to the nursery by bus, but today, they are all feeling bored.
4	"Beach Ball"	Jaqui McAlpine	Simon Jowett	5 September 2002
Josie gets locked out of her sports cupboard and cannot find a ball for games. She spots a flattened beach ball in Miss Hoolie's office, and thinks on how to put it to good use.
5	"The Missing Scarecrow"	Shiona McCubbin	Wayne Jackman	6 September 2002
Edie notices that the scarecrow is missing from the nursery vegetable patch.
6	"Storm in a Nursery"	Jaqui McAlpine	Duncan Fisher	9 September 2002
Edie arrives at the nursery looking for a lifejacket and is worried about her sailing trip with PC Plum.
7	"Walking the Dog"	Jaqui McAlpine	Kate Donnelly	10 September 2002
Josie Jump is looking after a dog named Ralph, but she doesn't know how to keep him amused.
8	"Art Gallery"	Yvonne Jennings	Alan Moss	11 September 2002
The children paint pictures to help cure Penny's hiccups.
9	"Seals"	Yvonne Jennings	Alan Moss	12 September 2002
Spencer visits the nursery with a bag of coloured paper that he doesn't know what to do with.
10	"Haircut"	Shiona McCubbin	Davey Moore	13 September 2002
PC Plum has trouble keeping his long floppy fringe out of his eyes.
11	"Jungle Story"	Jaqui McAlpine	Wayne Jackman	16 September 2002
Miss Hoolie hopes to take the children into the garden, but it is raining.
12	"Feeding the Lambs"	Jaqui McAlpine	Davey Moore	17 September 2002
PC Plum arrives at the nursery feeling very sleepy because he has been up for most of the night helping the local farmer feed his lambs.
13	"The Sandcastle"	Yvonne Jennings	Nigel Crowle	18 September 2002
Spencer wants to build a sandcastle with the children at the beach, but he needs a bucket and spade. Suzie and Penny's shop has sold out of buckets and spades, so what can he use instead of a real one?
14	"Odd Socks"	Yvonne Jennings	Keith Brumpton	19 September 2002
Archie's wearing odd socks, and he cannot find the other one.
15	"Mending a Puncture"	Jaqui McAlpine	Penny Lloyd	20 September 2002
PC Plum looks forward to umpiring the cricket match, but he has a flat tyre. Who can help him?
16	"Newborn Baby"	Yvonne Jennings	Brian Jameson	23 September 2002
Spencer calls in to tell Miss Hoolie that Tommy Mackenzie's mother has given birth to a baby girl. He goes off to buy things for the new baby, everything but a special present. What can Spencer do?
17	"The Lost Voice"	Jaqui McAlpine	Wayne Jackman	24 September 2002
PC Plum gets a sore throat and finds it incredibly difficult to do his duties.
18	"Camping"	Shiona McCubbin	Wayne Jackman	25 September 2002
Miss Hoolie and PC Plum plan to take her friends' children on a camping trip.
19	"Road Signs"	Shiona McCubbin	Penny Lloyd	26 September 2002
Edie McCredie discovers strange road signs with clown faces of them all around Balamory. Where did they come from?
20	"Golf"	Emma Pollard	Duncan Fisher	27 September 2002
Josie Jump teaches Spencer how to play golf.
21	"The Sandboat"	Jaqui McAlpine	Nigel Crowle	30 September 2002
Miss Hoolie asks PC Plum to take the children to the beach to collect shells.
22	"The Ferryboat"	Shiona McCubbin	Jane Kemp & Claire Walters	1 October 2002
Archie is looking after a boy called Liam, but Liam is unhappy because he was supposed to spend the day with his cousin Stevie, who is called in an emergency to operate the Balamory Ferry Boat.
23	"Ceilidh"	Emma Pollard	Penny Lloyd	2 October 2002
Suzie helps Miss Hoolie organise a ceilidh, but her rejection for help causes her to tire out when dancing.
24	"Suzie's Muddle"	Yvonne Jennings	Polly Kelly	3 October 2002
Suzie Sweet delivers the wrong things after Penny moves things on the shop shelves.
25	"Milking Cows"	Shiona McCubbin	Wayne Jackman	4 October 2002
Archie wants to show the nursery children his latest invention - a milk dispenser.
26	"Birthday Party"	Shiona McCubbin	Alan Moss	7 October 2002
PC Plum tries to organise a birthday party for Callum, his nephew. He prefers playing in cardboard boxes and using his imagination, so PC Plum must find something useful to give him.
27	"Musical Hamper"	Jaqui McAlpine	Keith Brumpton	8 October 2002
Penny organises a picnic lunch. But she needs a hamper to put everything in.
28	"Painting Plates"	Emma Pollard	Nigel Crowle	9 October 2002
Miss Hoolie asks Penny if there's anything in the shop that she could send to her friend in London from Balamory.
29	"Swimming with Spencer"	Emma Pollard	Penny Lloyd	10 October 2002
Spencer has been invited to go swimming on the mainland, but the only problem is he cannot swim. Who can teach him how to swim?
30	"Snake"	Shiona McCubbin	Keith Brumpton	11 October 2002
Miss Hoolie finds a toy rhino in her cupboard and asks Edie to tell the children a story about the rhino, but she decides to tell a story about a snake instead.
31	"Cleaning Teeth"	Emma Pollard	Alan Moss	14 October 2002
Miss Hoolie asks Josie Jump to come up with a fantastic routine to make the children's teeth sparkle.
32	"The Line Dance"	Emma Pollard	Kath Yelland	15 October 2002
Miss Hoolie asks Josie to teach the children how to line dance. The only problem is who can teach Josie?!
33	"Kite"	Jaqui McAlpine	Kath Yelland	16 October 2002
It is a windy day in Balamory, and PC Plum wants to go kite flying, but he has no kite. The shop has none left, so what can he do?
34	"Teddy Bears Picnic"	Emma Pollard	Kath Yelland	17 October 2002
Spencer loses his teddy bear, called Phillip. Will he be able to find him in time for the teddy bears' picnic?
35	"Guinea Pig"	Jaqui McAlpine	Dick Louden	18 October 2002
Archie is looking after a guinea pig called George. He goes to the shop to buy food for him, but when he returns, George is missing.
36	"Sound Sculpture"	Emma Pollard	Wayne Jackman	21 October 2002
Josie finds a key, but who does it belong to?
37	"Sports Day"	Jaqui McAlpine	Claire Walters & Jane Kemp	22 October 2002
Josie Jump is taken ill, and she has asked PC Plum to organise the games for the nursery sports day. However, he doesn't know one thing about sports.
38	"Sponge Painting"	Yvonne Jennings	Kath Yelland	23 October 2002
Spencer wants to do some painting in the garden with the children, but Miss Hoolie tells him it is too cold.
39	"Dressing Up Day"	Jaqui McAlpine	Nigel Crowle	24 October 2002
It is dressing up day in Balamory. Miss Hoolie and the children are really looking forward to it. But will Archie change PC Plum's mind about him dressing up as a policeman?
40	"The Lifeboat"	Yvonne Jennings	Ben Keaton	25 October 2002
Spencer paints a picture for the lifeboat station, but hasn't enough time to finish it. The children help him; but the painting is too big to go on Spencer's cart!
41	"Football"	Yvonne Jennings	Davey Moore	28 October 2002
Miss Hoolie asks Edie McCredie to hold a football match, but she doesn't know how the rules work.
42	"The Visit to the Doctor"	Emma Pollard	Stuart Gaunt	29 October 2002
Josie buys a gift for Peter Morrison, but ends up getting a sore foot and she has to see the doctor.
43	"Dances with Ribbons"	Yvonne Jennings	Nigel Crowle	30 October 2002
Josie organises a tea party.
44	"Go Cart"	Emma Pollard	Wayne Jackman	22 November 2002
Suzie learns to drive a car and plays a driving game with the children.
45	"Thunder"	Jaqui McAlpine	Wayne Jackman	1 November 2002
Penny has been kept awake by the noise of thunder. She goes to PC Plum's and tries to be brave, but the thunder keeps flashing brightly.
46	"Looking After Baby"	Emma Pollard	Alan Moss	21 November 2002
Josie has trouble looking after a baby after she accidentally wakes it up.
47	"The Tortoise and the Hare"	Jaqui McAlpine	Penny Lloyd	5 November 2002
Suzie is supposed to read the children a story, but she is having a very busy day.
48	"Sound Story"	Yvonne Jennings	Claire Walters & Jane Kemp	6 November 2002
Edie thinks the children might like to listen to a story tape while they're in her bus.
49	"Aeroplane"	Emma Pollard	Alan Moss	7 November 2002
Suzie wants to tell the children a story about flying, but she's never flown.
50	"Dirty Bus"	Yvonne Jennings	Johanna Hall	8 November 2002
Josie teaches everyone her cleaning song, but they soon run out of things to clean.
51	"One Man Band"	Shiona McCubbin	Alan Moss	11 November 2002
Today Spencer is off to the mainland to take part in a music festival.
52	"Regatta"	Shiona McCubbin	Polly Kelly	12 November 2002
It is Regatta day, but Archie finds a big problem — all the boats look the same. But Spencer has an idea.
53	"Pony Ride"	Shiona McCubbin	Davey Moore	13 November 2002
It is all happening today – there is spilt paint, some missing carrots and Archie's homemade carrot picking machine! What on earth is going on?
54	"Two by Two"	Yvonne Jennings	Penny Lloyd	14 November 2002
Josie wants to teach the children some animal movements today but she needs some help.
55	"Obstacle Course"	Emma Pollard	Kath Yelland	15 November 2002
Today, Suzie wants to get rid of some empty boxes from the shop, but she doesn't know what to do with them.
56	"Treasure Hunt"	Shiona McCubbin	Davey Moore	18 November 2002
Miss Hoolie asks PC Plum to organise a treasure hunt, but he will need a map and some treasure. Who can help?
57	"Garden Competition"	Shiona McCubbin	Wayne Jackman	19 November 2002
Spencer makes bunting for a garden competition.
58	"Underwater World"	Yvonne Jennings	Jill Brett	20 November 2002
Edie is taking the children to the aquarium, but the bus would not start.
59	"Pipe Tree"	Shiona McCubbin	Kath Yelland	4 November 2002
Miss Hoolie finds a pile of old pipes in the cupboard, but she has no idea what to do with them.
60	"Halloween"	Shiona McCubbin	Nigel Crowle	31 October 2002
It is Halloween in Balamory and Spencer brings in games for the children to play at a special fancy dress party at the nursery.
61	"Getting Up"	Emma Pollard	Penny Lloyd	25 November 2002
Edie is not very good at getting up in the morning.
62	"Noisy Hat"	Shiona McCubbin	Kath Yelland	26 November 2002
Archie has made a new invention called a noisy hat, and it makes farm animal noises. However, he doesn't know how to put it to good use.
63	"Basket Ball"	Emma Pollard	Nigel Crowle	27 November 2002
Today, Edie is supposed to referee a basketball match, but she doesn't know anything about basketball.
64	"Panto"	Gloria Thomas	Wayne Jackman	25 December 2002
It is Christmas in Balamory and a pantomime is held for the children at the Balamory Hall. Miss Hoolie takes the role of Cinderella, with Edie as Prince Charming. Archie and PC Plum put in star turns as the Ugly Sisters, Spencer is Buttons, and Josie is Dandini. Finally, Suzie and Penny put in an appearance as the two Fairy godmothers.
