= Balamory series 6 =

Balamory
- Series 6
- No. of episodes: 10

Release
- Original network: CBeebies; BBC iPlayer
- Original release: 12 October – 23 October 2026

Series chronology
- ← Previous; Series 5

The sixth series (also known on CBeebies and iPlayer as 2026 series two) of the live-action children's programme Balamory began airing in the United Kingdom on CBeebies and BBC iPlayer on 12 October 2026.

== Cast ==
=== Main characters ===
- Julie Wilson Nimmo as Miss Hoolie
- Andrew Agnew as PC Plum
- Kim Tserkezie as Penny Pocket
- Danielle Jam as Ava Potts
- Carl Spencer as Dr Ollie

=== Recurring characters ===
- Juliet Cadzow as Edie McCredie
- William Andrews as Harbourmaster

== Episodes ==
No. in series	Title	Directed by	Written by	CBeebies broadcast date	BBC iPlayer release date
1	"Berry Bandit"	Adrian Mead	Chris Grady	12 October 2026	12 October 2026
PC Plum needs to identify a pesky bird that has been munching his prize strawberries.
2	"The Explorers"	Adrian Mead	Stephen Buchanan	13 October 2026	12 October 2026
Miss Hoolie and the children are set for a woodland trip, but the wind tears Ollie's map.
3	"The Balamory Games"	Adrian Mead	Raisah Ahmed	14 October 2026	12 October 2026
With the games in peril, Ava seeks a new chieftain - unaware she is perfect for the role!
4	"Deep Sea Adventure"	Adrian Mead	Rachael Pearson	15 October 2026	12 October 2026
After diving in Balamory Bay, PC Plum dreams of taking the nursery children underwater.
5	"You Laugh You Lose"	Adrian Mead	Mark Robertson	16 October 2026	12 October 2026
Penny coaches PC Plum for the You Laugh You Lose contest, but it's trickier than expected.
6	"Dance Away"	Adrian Mead	Peter Hynes	19 October 2026	12 October 2026
It's the nursery dance away, but Ava feels she can't dance like everyone else.
7	"Hat's the Idea"	Adrian Mead	Chris Grady	20 October 2026	12 October 2026
Dr Ollie has lost his thinking cap and can't think of a new song for the children.
8	"Rest Quest"	Adrian Mead	Becky Overton	21 October 2026	12 October 2026
Penny hopes for a relaxing garden day but ends up helping her busy friends instead.
9	"Playing Shops"	Adrian Mead	Nathan Cockerill	22 October 2026	12 October 2026
A mishap with a How-to Hat shows Penny that the best way to learn is through play.
10	"Sleepy Spot"	Adrian Mead	Chris Grady	23 October 2026	12 October 2026
An exhausted Dr Ollie searches for somewhere quiet, but not too quiet, for his nap.
