= Balamory series 3 =

2004 Scottish television season

Balamory
- Series 3
- No. of episodes: 63

Release
- Original network: CBeebies
- Original release: 20 September – 15 December 2004

Series chronology
- ← Previous; Series 2 Next → Series 4

The third series of the live-action children's programme Balamory began airing in the United Kingdom on CBeebies on 20 September 2004 and finished on 15 December 2004.

== Cast ==
=== Main characters ===
- Julie Wilson Nimmo as Miss Hoolie
- Andrew Agnew as PC Plum
- Mary Riggans as Suzie Sweet
- Kim Tserkezie as Penny Pocket
- Juliet Cadzow as Edie McCredie
- Kasia Haddad as Josie Jump
- Miles Jupp as Archie
- Rodd Christensen as Spencer

== Episodes ==
No. in series	Title	Directed by	Written by	Original release date
1	"Oh Dear"	Jaqui McAlpine	Brian Jameson	20 September 2004
Edie wants to go deer spotting with PC Plum, but when she finds out Archie has her tent and his nephews are enjoying using it, Archie suggests another way – by dressing up as a pantomime horse. This new plan however causes trouble around Balamory.
2	"Plonk Blocks"	Jaqui McAlpine	Wayne Jackman	21 September 2004
Josie Jump searches for special building blocks to help her tell a fairground story.
3	"Postcards"	Martin Burt	Penny Lloyd	22 September 2004
Penny gets distracted by watching a football match, and forgets to make an important order for the shop.
4	"Suzie's Flying Lesson"	Paul Holmes	Penny Lloyd	23 September 2004
Suzie takes a flying lesson, but needs someone to go with her so they can tell the children what the island looks like from the air.
5	"Beach Bonanza"	Uncredited	Davey Moore	24 September 2004
Miss Hoolie faces a dilemma when she makes too many promises of taking people to the beach.
6	"Sausages"	Paul Holmes	Davey Moore	27 September 2004
Edie has so much to do, and is so caught up on rushing tasks in order to prepare for a visit to the farm with the children that she forgets to close her bus door and the sausages she bought are taken. Who has stolen them?
7	"Gospel Choir"	Shiona McCubbin	Davey Moore	28 September 2004
PC Plum organises a gospel choir performance at the nursery. But he spends so much time practising his singing that he neglects his police work – leaving Penny to solve a mystery involving missing flowers.
8	"The Ballet"	Shiona McCubbin	Peter Hynes	29 September 2004
Josie asks Miss Hoolie to help think of a ballet the children might enjoy watching her class perform.
9	"Tantrums"	Jaqui McAlpine	Penny Lloyd	30 September 2004
Archie keeps getting angry when things aren't going the way he wants. However, there is someone in Balamory to help him calm down.
10	"Spaghetti Day"	Paul Holmes	Penny Lloyd	1 October 2004
It is PC Plum's Birthday, and he promises to take Miss Hoolie to an Italian restaurant to celebrate. However, after getting caught up on work, they both miss the ferry. What can they do?
11	"Buggies and Prams"	Martin Burt	Wayne Jackman	4 October 2004
Josie is meant to be taking the mums and toddlers with their buggies and prams to the soft play centre in the big city, but is worried that she'll get lost.
12	"Couch Potato"	Paul Holmes	Penny Lloyd	5 October 2004
Edie is tired out, she is having to do favours for Archie. When they both get wiped, who will help them get back on their feet again?
13	"Horsepower"	Paul Holmes	Wayne Jackman	6 October 2004
Miss Hoolie and her visitors are meant to tour Balamory on Edie's bus, but it develops a problem that even Archie can't fix.
14	"Broken Down Bus"	Uncredited	Wayne Jackman	7 October 2004
Edie goes missing in the snow. PC Plum goes out in the snow to find Edie before the steel band concert begins.
15	"Five a Side"	Jaqui McAlpine	Peter Hynes	8 October 2004
Suzie organises a five-a-side football match, but she doesn't know how to play football.
16	"The Street Party"	Shiona McCubbin	Wayne Jackman	11 October 2004
The nursery holds a street party, but Miss Hoolie and Spencer worry that it's too cold for anyone to come.
17	"The Rhyme Machine"	Shiona McCubbin	Johanna Hall	12 October 2004
Archie invents a fantastic rhyme machine, but he doesn't know what it should be used for. Josie Jump gets so excited about testing his new invention, but who can help Archie put the finishing touches to it?
18	"Paper Chase"	Shiona McCubbin	Wayne Jackman	13 October 2004
Miss Hoolie wants Spencer to paint a large picture of Balamory for the nursery wall.
19	"Lost Then Sorted"	Paul Holmes	Peter Hynes	14 October 2004
PC Plum is on the case when many things start to go missing in Balamory, but he is surprised to discover who the culprit is.
20	"Whale of a Day"	Shiona McCubbin	David MacLennan	15 October 2004
PC Plum arranges to take Miss Hoolie whale-watching.
21	"The Boat Race"	Jaqui McAlpine	Peter Hynes	18 October 2004
Penny Pocket organises a boat race for her sailing company.
22	"Reflections"	Jaqui McAlpine	Johanna Hall	19 October 2004
A puddle inspires Archie to create a reflecting machine.
23	"The Lost Bicycle"	Uncredited	Wayne Jackman	20 October 2004
PC Plum's bicycle goes missing and he investigates its disappearance.
24	"Pirate Radio"	Jaqui McAlpine	Peter Hynes	21 October 2004
PC Plum investigates strange emanations coming from his police radio, and from taps and kettles all over Balamory.
25	"Seaside Inside"	Shiona McCubbin	Peter Hynes	22 October 2004
It's a rainy day, so the cafe is packed with people. PC Plum cancels his bird-watching plans to do crowd control. The children want to go to the beach, but the rain is preventing them. What can they do?
26	"Marching Band"	Martin Burt	Penny Lloyd	25 October 2004
Suzie organises a street parade.
27	"Hub Caps"	Uncredited	Wayne Jackman	26 October 2004
PC Plum finds a lot of old hubcaps but doesn't know what to use them for.
28	"Anansi"	Paul Holmes	Peter Hynes	27 October 2004
Josie Jump decides to tell the children a story about Anansi the Spider, although Miss Hoolie appears to be arachnophobic.
29	"The Fiddle Player"	Shiona McCubbin	Wayne Jackman	28 October 2004
Today, the famous fiddle player Shiona Docherty comes to visit Miss Hoolie. Shiona and Spencer give the nursery children a concert.
30	"The Pixie Picnic"	Martin Burt	Wayne Jackman	29 October 2004
Spencer organises a Pixie Picnic. He has prepared some Pixie costumes, but has forgotten to prepare the games.
31	"Otters"	Uncredited	Wayne Jackman	1 November 2004
Josie is frustrated with all the litter around Balamory. She starts a campaign to discourage it, but soon finds out what is happening.
32	"Whale Bank"	Jaqui McAlpine	Davey Moore	2 November 2004
A lot of money has been left on Edie's bus, and she is unsure about what to do with it.
33	"Party Games"	Shiona McCubbin	Jane Kemp & Claire Walters	3 November 2004
Archie invents a party pack, but he soon realises that it looks dull and boring.
34	"The Clown"	Jaqui McAlpine	Peter Hynes	4 November 2004
Giggles the Clown is performing at the nursery today, but, rather carelessly, he has lost his make-up, juggling balls, magic wand and the rest of his clown stuff.
35	"Anyone for Tennis?"	Shiona McCubbin	Peter Hynes	5 November 2004
PC Plum tries to solve the mystery of why coloured spots have suddenly appeared around town.
36	"Sand Shapes"	Shiona McCubbin	Wayne Jackman	8 November 2004
PC Plum learns how important it is to be responsible when he tries to juggle his job with helping out at the nursery.
37	"Leaking Roof"	Paul Holmes	Penny Lloyd	9 November 2004
It is raining in Balamory, and when the drips in the nursery become too much, who will come to the rescue?
38	"Noise Annoys"	Shiona McCubbin	Wayne Jackman	10 November 2004
Spencer is full of beans, but not everyone shares his enthusiasm for the day.
39	"The Juggler"	Paul Holmes	Kath Yelland	11 November 2004
Josie's juggling friend comes to visit the nursery.
40	"A Ship at the Bottom of the Sea"	Jaqui McAlpine	Wayne Jackman	12 November 2004
Archie finds an anchor from an old ship at the bottom of the sea.
41	"Light Festival"	Jaqui McAlpine	Davey Moore	15 November 2004
It's Josie's birthday. The nursery celebrates the Light Festival, a very special day for Josie.
42	"Vibrations"	Uncredited	Johanna Hall	16 November 2004
Edie hears some strange noises outside her house this morning.
43	"The Love Letter"	Uncredited	Johanna Hall	17 November 2004
When Edie comes to Miss Hoolie's house to help feed her cat, Ted, the house is in a mess and there is no sign of the cat.
44	"Bed Time"	Paul Holmes	Wayne Jackman	18 November 2004
Archie gets confused by his latest invention; a wakeup machine, but someone helps him find a solution.
45	"Ten Pin Bowling"	Shiona McCubbin	Penny Lloyd	19 November 2004
Chaos reigns when fun and games get out of control at Miss Hoolie's house.
46	"The Storyteller"	Shiona McCubbin	Peter Hynes	22 November 2004
A storyteller has come to the nursery to tell the children a tale about a Leprechaun.
47	"The Puddle Walk"	Shiona McCubbin	Peter Hynes	23 November 2004
PC Plum takes the children on a puddle walk in the forest.
48	"The Dentist"	Paul Holmes	Jane Kemp & Claire Walters	24 November 2004
Archie has a new invention to help him organise his day.
49	"Guide Dog"	Jaqui McAlpine	Wayne Jackman	25 November 2004
It's a foggy day in Balamory, and someone has to lead the way.
50	"Counting"	Martin Burt	Wayne Jackman	26 November 2004
It's a crazy golf day in Balamory, but who is winning?
51	"Bring and Tell Day"	Jaqui McAlpine	Wayne Jackman	29 November 2004
It is Bring and Tell Day at the nursery, and PC Plum is in for a surprise!
52	"The Stick Up"	Paul Holmes	Davey Moore	30 November 2004
When PC Plum gets money stuck to his bottom at Pocket and Sweet's, Penny tries to go after him, but finds it hard to catch up.
53	"Hospital Radio"	Martin Burt	Wayne Jackman	1 December 2004
Suzie trains Penny to be the next hospital DJ.
54	"The Lost Cow"	Uncredited	Wayne Jackman	2 December 2004
PC Plum investigates the disappearance of Roddy Macleod's cow, Alison.
55	"I Want a Dog"	Paul Holmes	Wayne Jackman	3 December 2004
Suzie and Penny take Miss Hoolie to the dog's home to see Tootsie.
56	"Train Ride"	Uncredited	Penny Lloyd	6 December 2004
The Balamory Choir is going on an outing, but someone creates a muddle.
57	"Blossom"	Martin Burt	Clare Bradley	7 December 2004
Spring is in the air, but Spencer is too busy to stop and notice.
58	"The Flicker Book"	Martin Burt	Wayne Jackman	8 December 2004
Josie wants to teach everyone how to tell a story, so Spencer gives her a hand.
59	"Spooks"	Jaqui McAlpine	Peter Hynes	9 December 2004
It's a foggy day in Balamory and Edie tells Archie he's ironing some blankets for ghosts.
60	"Sandcastle Competition"	Shiona McCubbin	Davey Moore	10 December 2004
A very important person is coming to judge a sandcastle competition at the beach, but will they arrive on time?
61	"The Actor"	Paul Holmes	Wayne Jackman	13 December 2004
Archie is very impressed with Miss Hoolie's special guest.
62	"Steam Tractor"	Jaqui McAlpine	Davey Moore	14 December 2004
PC Plum delays his outing with Miss Hoolie while he investigates a mystery object.
63	"Skiing"	Uncredited	Wayne Jackman	15 December 2004
It's a snowy day in Balamory and Josie goes missing. Spencer needs to find her so the band can play.
