= List of Scottish actors =

This list of Scottish actors is part of the List of Scots series.

== A ==
- Khalid Abdalla (born 1980)
- Andrew Agnew (born 1976)
- Sadie Aitken (1905–1985)
- Spottiswoode Aitken (1868–1933)
- Maev Alexander (born 1948)
- John Alford (1971–2026)
- Andrea Allan (born 1946)
- Ronni Ancona (born 1966)
- Dave Anderson (born 1945)
- Rona Anderson (1926–2013)
- David Ashton (born 1941)

== B ==
- Shabana Bakhsh (born 1981)
- Ian Bannen (1928–1999)
- Lois de Banzie (1930–2021)
- John Barrowman (born 1967)
- Stanley Baxter (1926–2025)
- Johnny Beattie (1926–2020)
- Maureen Beattie (born 1953)
- Duncan Bell (born 1955)
- John Bell (born 1997)
- Margaret Bicknell (1681–1723)
- Sean Biggerstaff (born 1983)
- Isobel Black (born 1943)
- Peter Blake (1948–2018)
- Martin Boddey (1907–1975)
- Mark Bonnar (born 1968)
- Stuart Bowman
- Billy Boyd (born 1968)
- Kate Bracken (born 1990)
- Joseph Brady (1928–2001)
- Steven Brand (born 1969)
- Paul Brannigan (born 1986)
- Ewen Bremner (born 1972)
- Rory Bremner (born 1961)
- Edmund Breon (1882–1951)
- Laurie Brett (born 1969)
- Janet Brown (1923–2011)
- Julia Brown (born 1997)
- Katrina Bryan (born 1980)
- Colin Buchanan (born 1966)
- Ian Buchanan (born 1957)
- Jack Buchanan (1891–1957)
- Robert Buchanan (born 1962)
- Tam Dean Burn (born 1958)
- Gerard Butler (born 1969)

== C ==
- Jean Cadell (1884–1967)
- Juliet Cadzow (born 1951)
- John Cairney (1930–2023)
- Ian Cairns (born 1963)
- Ricky Callan (1962–2016)
- Dayton Callie (born 1956)
- Gianni Capaldi (born 1975)
- Peter Capaldi (born 1958)
- Victor Carin (1932–1981)
- Robert Carlyle (born 1961)
- Walter Carr (1925–1998)
- Helena Carroll (1928–2013)
- Michael Carter (born 1947)
- Robert Cavanah (born 1965)
- Ian Charleson (1949–1990)
- Morven Christie (born 1981)
- Hamish Clark (born 1965)
- Jameson Clark (1907–1984)
- Sophie Kennedy Clark (born 1990)
- Scott Cleverdon (born 1969)
- Andy Clyde (1892–1967)
- Robbie Coltrane (1950–2022)
- Martin Compston (born 1984)
- Ruth Connell (born 1979)
- Neil Connery (1938–2021)
- Sir Sean Connery (1930–2020)
- Billy Connolly (born 1942)
- Tom Conti (born 1941)
- James Copeland (1918–2002)
- Kate Copstick (born 1956)
- Kari Corbett (born 1984)
- Ronnie Corbett (1930–2016)
- Frankie Corio (born 2010)
- Adrienne Corri (1930–2016)
- Paul-James Corrigan
- James Cosmo (born 1948)
- Brian Cox (born 1946)
- Mark Cox (born 1972)
- Alec Craig (1884–1945)
- Kenneth Cranham (born 1944)
- Annette Crosbie (born 1934)
- Graham Crowden (1922–2010)
- Sara Crowe (born 1966)
- Andrew Cruickshank (1907–1988)
- Eric Cullen (1965–1996)
- Alan Cumming (born 1965)
- Fiona Cumming (1937–2015)
- Tony Curran (born 1969)
- Finlay Currie (1878–1968)
- Henry Ian Cusick (born 1967)
- Iain Cuthbertson (1930–2009)
- Ivor Cutler (1923–2006)

== D ==
- Jake D'Arcy (1945–2015)
- Ross Davidson (1949–2006)
- Benjamin Davies (born 1980)
- Anthony Dawson (1916–1992)
- Michael Deacon (1933–2000)
- Iain De Caestecker (born 1987)
- Kate Dickie (born 1971)
- Jack Docherty (born 1962)
- Thomas Doherty (born 1995)
- Fiona Dolman (born 1970)
- Ron Donachie (born 1956)
- James Donald (1917–1993)
- Donald Douglas (1933–2026)
- Blythe Duff (born 1962)
- Duncan Duff (born 1964)
- Karen Dunbar (born 1971)
- Archie Duncan (1914–1979)
- Lindsay Duncan (born 1950)
- Michelle Duncan (born 1978)
- William Dysart (1929–2002)

== E ==
- Freddie Earlle (1924–2007)
- Valerie Edmond (born 1969)
- Zoë Eeles (born 1975)
- David Elliot (born 1981)
- Emun Elliott (born 1983)
- Kieron Elliott
- Suzy Enoch

== F ==
- Andrew Fairlie (born 1963)
- Kellyanne Farquhar
- Craig Ferguson (born 1962)
- Lynn Ferguson (born 1965)
- Alex Ferns (born 1968)
- Jimmy Finlayson (1887–1953)
- Gregor Fisher (born 1953)
- Isla Fisher (born 1976)
- Jeannie Fisher (born 1947)
- Lesley Fitz-Simons (1961–2013)
- Tommy Flanagan (born 1965)
- Susan Fleetwood (1944–1995)
- Tom Fleming (1927–2010)
- Ryan Fletcher (born 1982)
- Peter Forbes (born 1960)
- Carl Forgione (1944–1998)
- Brigit Forsyth (1940–2023)
- Polly Frame (born 1976)
- Alan Francis (born 1967)
- Bill Fraser (1908–1987)
- John Fraser (1931–2020)
- Laura Fraser (born 1976)
- Peter Fraser (born 1932 or 1933)
- Colin Friels (born 1952)
- Chris Fulton (born 1988)
- Rikki Fulton (1924–2004)
- Robert Fyfe (1930–2021)

== G ==
- John Gaffney
- Patricia Gage (1940–2010)
- Frank Gallagher (born 1962)
- Jack Galloway (born 1947)
- David Gant (born 1943)
- Graeme Garden (born 1943)
- Ncuti Gatwa (born 1992)
- James Gillan (born 1975)
- Karen Gillan (born 1987)
- William Gillespie (1894–1938)
- Iain Glen (born 1961)
- Helena Gloag (1909–1973)
- Isabella Glyn (1823–1889)
- Janey Godley (1961–2024)
- Valerie Gogan (born 1960)
- Michelle Gomez (born 1966)
- Stella Gonet (born 1963)
- Claire Goose (born 1975)
- Hannah Gordon (born 1941)
- Mary Gordon (1882–1963)
- Colin Graham (1931–2007)
- Julie Graham (born 1965)
- Morland Graham (1891–1949)
- Andy Gray (1959–2021)
- Elspet Gray (1929–2013)
- Frances Grey (born 1970)
- John Grieve (1924–2003)
- Ian Grieve (born 1965)
- Clare Grogan (born 1962)
- Sorcha Groundsell (born 1998)
- Pippa Guard (born 1952)

== H ==
- Kasia Haddad (born 1979)
- Gay Hamilton (born 1943)
- Prentis Hancock (1942–2025)
- John Hannah (born 1962)
- Billy Hartman (born 1957)
- David Hayman (born 1948)
- Daniel Healy (born 1986)
- Lorna Heilbron (born 1948)
- Vivien Heilbron (born 1944)
- Greg Hemphill (born 1969)
- Betty Henderson (1907–1979)
- Shirley Henderson (born 1965)
- Rae Hendrie (born 1977)
- Douglas Henshall (born 1965)
- Dee Hepburn (born 1961)
- Eileen Herlie (1918–2008)
- Sam Heughan (born 1980)
- Pat Heywood (1931–2024)
- Paul Higgins (born 1964)
- Gary Hollywood (born 1979)
- Morag Hood (1942–2002)
- Ewan Hooper (1935–2023)
- Renée Houston (1902–1980)
- Russell Hunter (1925–2004)
- Ken Hutchison (1948–2021)
- Olaf Hytten (1888–1955)

== I ==
- Armando Iannucci (born 1964)
- Frieda Inescort (1901–1976)
- Millie Innes (born 2000)
- Kenny Ireland (1945–2014)
- Paul Ireland (born 1970)

== J ==
- Gordon Jackson (1923–1990)
- Duncan Airlie James (born 1961)
- Robert James (1924–2004)
- Ashley Jensen (born 1968)
- Jayd Johnson (born 1990)
- Kaiya Jones (born 1996)

== K ==
- John Kane (born 1945)
- Sean Kane (born 1969)
- Stan Kane (1929–2015)
- Marysia Kay (born 1975)
- Jenni Keenan-Green
- Andrew Keir (1926–1997)
- Gerard Kelly (1959–2010)
- Ryan Kelly
- Moultrie Kelsall (1901–1980)
- Fiona Kennedy (born 1955)
- Gordon Kennedy (born 1958)
- Callum Kerr (born 1994)
- Deborah Kerr (1921–2007)
- Ford Kiernan (born 1962)
- Georgia King (born 1986)
- Kananu Kirimi (born 1977)
- Scott Kyle (born 1983)

== L ==
- Simon Lack (1913–1980)
- Simone Lahbib (born 1965)
- Robin Laing (born 1976)
- Declan Michael Laird (born 1993)
- Jack Lambert (1899–1976)
- David Langton (1912–1994)
- Bryan Larkin (born 1973)
- John Laurie (1897–1980)
- Phyllida Law (1932–2026)
- Denis Lawson (born 1947)
- Benny Lee (1916–1995)
- Jane Lee (1912–1957)
- Angus Lennie (1930–2014)
- Gerald Lepkowski (born 1966)
- Rose Leslie (born 1987)
- Katie Leung (born 1987)
- Gary Lewis (born 1957)
- Ashley Lilley (born 1986)
- Debbie Linden (1961–1997)
- Sarah Liston (1781–1854)
- Crawford Logan
- Ella Logan (1913–1969)
- Phyllis Logan (born 1956)
- Jack Lowden (born 1990)
- Lulu (born 1948)
- Lauren Lyle (born 1993)

== M ==
- Cal MacAninch (born 1963)
- Edith MacArthur (1926–2018)
- Aimi MacDonald (born 1942)
- Kelly Macdonald (born 1976)
- Shauna Macdonald (born 1981)
- Angus Macfadyen (born 1963)
- Mirren Mack (born 1997)
- Fulton Mackay (1922–1987)
- Alastair Mackenzie (born 1970)
- Alex Mackenzie (1885–1965)
- James Mackenzie (born 1979)
- Lewis MacLeod (born 1970)
- Alan MacNaughtan (1920–2002)
- Ian MacNaughton (1925–2002)
- James MacPherson (born 1960)
- Duncan Macrae (1905–1967)
- Leah MacRae
- Richard Madden (born 1986)
- Laura Main (born 1981)
- Christopher Malcolm (1946–2014)
- John Malcolm (1936–2008)
- Margaret Mann (1868–1941)
- Amy Manson (born 1985)
- Shirley Manson (born 1966)
- Chris Martin (born 1980)
- James Martin (1931–2025)
- Forbes Masson (born 1963)
- Hans Matheson (born 1975)
- Freya Mavor (born 1993)
- Lisa McAllister (born 1980)
- Libby McArthur
- Alex McAvoy (1928–2005)
- James McAvoy (born 1979)
- Phil McCall (1925–2002)
- Ross McCall (born 1976)
- David McCallum (1933–2023)
- Eileen McCallum (born 1936)
- Rory McCann (born 1969)
- Brian McCardie (1965–2024)
- Jane McCarry (born 1970)
- Stephen McCole
- Billy McColl (1951–2014)
- Iain McColl (1954–2013)
- Gordon McCorkell (born 1983)
- Sylvester McCoy (born 1943)
- Colin McCredie (born 1972)
- Alex McCrindle (1911–1990)
- Andrew McCulloch (born 1945)
- Ian McCulloch (born 1939)
- Kathleen McDermott (born 1977)
- Ian McDiarmid (born 1944)
- Jack McElhone (born 1994)
- Joe McFadden (born 1975)
- Graeme McGeagh
- Paul McGillion (born 1969)
- John McGlynn (born 1953)
- Ewan McGregor (born 1971)
- Stuart McGugan (born 1944)
- Greg McHugh (born 1980)
- Neve McIntosh (born 1972)
- David McKay
- James McKenna (born 1953)
- Allison McKenzie (born 1979)
- Lindsay McKenzie (born 1985)
- Kevin McKidd (born 1973)
- Norman McKinnel (1870–1932)
- Stewart McLean (1941–2006)
- Una McLean (born 1930)
- Roddy McMillan (1923–1979)
- Steven McNicoll
- Neil McNulty (born 1985)
- Hilton McRae (born 1949)
- Peter McRobbie (born 1943)
- Graham McTavish (born 1961)
- Raymond Mearns (born 1967)
- Donald Meek (1878–1946)
- Ruth Millar (born 1975)
- Steven Miller (born 1982)
- Gavin Mitchell (born 1966)
- Kirsty Mitchell (born 1974)
- Colin Mochrie (born 1957)
- Henry Mollison (1905–1985)
- Alec Monteath (1941–2021)
- Campbell Morrison (1952–2008)
- Jon Morrison
- Alexander Morton (1945–2026)
- Euan Morton (born 1977)
- Ashley Mulheron (born 1986)
- Tiffany Mulheron (born 1984)
- Peter Mullan (born 1959)
- Alex Munro (1911–1986)
- Katy Murphy (born 1963)

== N ==
- Daniela Nardini (born 1968)
- Michael Nardone (born 1966)
- Alec Newman (born 1974)
- Hector Nicol (1920–1985)
- Claire Nielson (1937–2026)
- Alex Norton (born 1950)
- Neil Ellice (born 1990)

== O ==
- Gray O'Brien (born 1968)
- Christy O'Donnell (born 1997)
- Katharine O'Donnelly
- David O'Hara (born 1965)
- Colette O'Neil (1935–2021)
- Tony Osoba (born 1947)

== P ==
- David Paisley (born 1979)
- John Paisley (born 1938)
- Marianna Palka (born 1981)
- Ray Park (born 1974)
- Bill Paterson (born 1945)
- Caroline Paterson (born 1965)
- Dorothy Paul (born 1937)
- Eve Pearce (1929–2023)
- Alison Peebles (born 1956)
- Hay Petrie (1895–1948)
- Carmen Pieraccini (born 1979)
- Jacqueline Pirie (born 1975)
- Daniel Portman (born 1992)
- Duncan Pow (born 1980)
- Mark Prendergast (born 1983)

== R ==
- Ashly Rae
- Barbara Rafferty (born 1950)
- Cecil Ramage (1895–1988)
- Richard Rankin (born 1983)
- Siobhan Redmond (born 1959)
- Gordon Reid (1939–2003)
- Sally Reid (born 1982)
- Sheila Reid (born 1937)
- Enn Reitel (born 1950)
- Ralph Riach (1936–2022)
- Ian Richardson (1934–2007)
- Derek Riddell (born 1967)
- Mary Riggans (1935–2013)
- Paul Riley (born 1962)
- David Rintoul (born 1948)
- Heather Ripley (born 1959)
- Natalie J. Robb (born 1974)
- Andrew Robertson (born 1941)
- Iain Robertson (born 1981)
- Robert Robertson (1930–2001)
- Sam Robertson (born 1985)
- Steven Robertson (born 1980)
- Michael E. Rodgers (born 1969)
- Maurice Roëves (1937–2020)
- Sharon Rooney (born 1988)
- Tony Roper (born 1941)
- George Rossi (1960–2022)
- William Ruane (born 1985)
- Laurance Rudic (born 1952)
- Clive Russell (born 1945)

== S ==
- Dougray Scott (born 1965)
- Elizabeth Sellars (1921–2019)
- John Sessions (1953–2020)
- Michael Sheard (1938–2005)
- Moira Shearer (1926–2006)
- Alastair Sim (1900–1976)
- Bill Simpson (1931–1986)
- Adam Sinclair (born 1977)
- John Gordon Sinclair (born 1962)
- Marli Siu (born 1993)
- Sharon Small (born 1967)
- James Smillie (born 1944)
- Elaine C. Smith (born 1958)
- Milind Soman (born 1965)
- Henry Stamper (1937–2009)
- Dawn Steele (born 1975)
- Gerda Stevenson (born 1956)
- Ewan Stewart (born 1959)
- Jeff Stewart (born 1955)
- Sara Stewart (born 1966)
- Ken Stott (born 1954)
- Kirsty Strain (born 1980)
- Melissa Stribling (1927–1992)
- John Stuart (1898–1979)
- Irene Sunters (1928–2005)
- Maureen Swanson (1932–2011)
- Jim Sweeney (born 1956)
- Tilda Swinton (born 1960)

== T ==
- Arthur Taxier (born 1951)
- Paul Telfer (born 1979)
- David Tennant (born 1971)
- Jack Thibeau (born 1946)
- Emma Thompson (born 1959)
- Sophie Thompson (born 1962)
- David Torrence (1864–1951)
- Ernest Torrence (1878–1933)
- Aisha Toussaint (born 1995)
- Kay Tremblay (1914–2005)

== U ==
- Gudrun Ure (1926–2024)
- Mary Ure (1933–1975)
- Tom Urie (born 1969)
- Molly Urquhart (1906–1977)
- Robert Urquhart (1921–1995)

== V ==
- Steve Valentine (born 1966)
- Joanna Vanderham (born 1990)
- Sandra Voe (born 1936)

== W ==
- Dave Ward (born 1957)
- Keith Warwick (born 1975)
- Russell Waters (1908–1982)
- James Watson (born 1970)
- Jonathan Watson (born 1956)
- Tom Watson (1932–2001)
- Molly Weir (1910–2004)
- Simon Weir (born 1973)
- Karen Westwood
- Tam White (1942–2010)
- Jon Whiteley (1945–2020)
- Nicol Williamson (1936–2011)
- Hamish Wilson (1942–2020)
- Richard Wilson (born 1936)
- Julie Wilson Nimmo (born 1972)
- Vincent Winter (1947–1998)
- Madeleine Worrall (born 1977)

== Y ==
- Atta Yaqub (born 1979)
- Benny Young (born 1949)
- John Young (1916–1996)
- Paul Young (born 1944)
- Jimmy Yuill (born 1956)
- Joe Yule (1892–1950)
