= Balamory series 5 =

Balamory
- Series 5
- No. of episodes: 10

Release
- Original network: CBeebies; BBC iPlayer
- Original release: 20 April – 1 May 2026

Series chronology
- ← Previous; Series 4 Next → Series 6

The fifth series (also known on CBeebies and iPlayer as 2026 series one) of the live-action children's programme Balamory began airing in the United Kingdom on CBeebies on 20 April 2026. This series sees the revival of the programme following a 21-year hiatus. On 7 April 2026, it was announced that the series would premiere on 20 April on CBeebies with all episodes being available on BBC iPlayer.

== Cast ==
=== Main characters ===
- Julie Wilson Nimmo as Miss Hoolie
- Andrew Agnew as PC Plum
- Kim Tserkezie as Penny Pocket
- Danielle Jam as Ava Potts
- Carl Spencer as Dr Ollie
- Juliet Cadzow as Edie McCredie
- William Andrews as Harbourmaster

On 18 July 2025, the BBC officially announced that Julie Wilson Nimmo, Andrew Agnew, Kim Tserkezie and Juliet Cadzow would reprise their roles as Miss Hoolie, PC Plum, Penny Pocket and Edie McCredie, respectively. Three new cast members and their characters were also revealed; Danielle Jam as the scientist and inventor Ava Potts, William Andrews as the Harbourmaster, and Carl Spencer as local veterinarian Dr Ollie.

== Episodes ==
No. in series	Title	Directed by	Written by	CBeebies broadcast date	BBC iPlayer release date
1	"One Man Band"	Adrian Mead	Mark Robertson	20 April 2026	20 April 2026
PC Plum is determined to perform Great-Granny Plum's song at the Balamory ceilidh all by himself, but he soon realises it isn't easy being a one-man band.
2	"Storytime"	Adrian Mead	Peter Hynes	21 April 2026	20 April 2026
When Dr Ollie discovers the Story Bus is delayed, he vows to save the day by inventing a new story to tell Miss Hoolie and the children.
3	"Plant Panic"	Adrian Mead	Howard Read	22 April 2026	20 April 2026
With the harbour master away, Penny Pocket tends to his beloved pet plant, Colin. But Colin is in a sad and droopy state.
4	"Solar Scramble"	Adrian Mead	Mark Robertson	23 April 2026	20 April 2026
Ava's solar gadgets malfunction, making her doubt her skills. But with PC Plum's encouragement, she realises that each invention needs a different-sized solar panel.
5	"Volcano Mix-Up"	Adrian Mead	Simon A. Brown	24 April 2026	20 April 2026
PC Plum jumps to conclusions when he hears about an upcoming volcanic eruption. But little does he know, it's Ava's science project.
6	"Mending Magic"	Adrian Mead	Stephen Buchanan	27 April 2026	20 April 2026
On Big Fix day, Ava's Good-As-New machine repairs everything - even things that don't need mending.
7	"Balamorysaurus"	Adrian Mead	Emma Lennox	28 April 2026	20 April 2026
Penny brings a dinosaur fossil to the nursery, but mysterious footprints have her wondering if there's a real dino on the island.
8	"Box Bot"	Adrian Mead	Eubha Akilade	29 April 2026	20 April 2026
PC Plum uses Ava's doubling machine by mistake, doubling all his recycling. But with Dr Ollie's help, it becomes Cyclo the Recycling Robot.
9	"Mystery Wizard"	Adrian Mead	Chris Grady	30 April 2026	20 April 2026
Dr Ollie forgets who he asked to play the wizard in his play with Ava's memory-jogging machine helping him recall.
10	"Holiday Help"	Adrian Mead	Emma Lennox	1 May 2026	20 April 2026
Miss Hoolie is planning a cycling holiday around Balamory, but her old bike needs attention. Ava offers to fix it, but a few small repairs turn into a much bigger challenge.
