= Woolly and Tig =

British television series

Woolly and Tig is a Scottish series of 5-minute live action comedies about a five-year-old girl (Tig) and her toy spider called Woolly. The show was first broadcast on BBC CBeebies in 2012.

One of the directors is Andrew Agnew, who played PC Plum in the children's series Balamory. Woolly and Tig is produced by Tattiemoon, who produced Balamory and Me Too!

== Cast ==
The character of Tig is played by 3 year old Betsy McCredie; Tig's Dad is played by Colin McCredie (Betsy's actual father); Tig's Mum is played by actress Jenny Ryan (Betsy's Aunt) and the series is narrated by older Tig who is played by Maisie McCredie (Betsy's older sister).

== Story ==
Each episode shows the main character, Tig Jameson, in a different situation such as being afraid of thunder or staying away from home. Woolly is Tig's imaginary friend. He is a stuffed spider toy, though Tig sees him as real. He helps Tig overcome issues she faces by giving her advice.

Episodes generally end with a character getting frightened by Woolly and running away.

== Episodes ==
The BBC CBeebies page dedicated to the programme lists 30 episodes, with a summary of each.

=== Series 1 (2012) ===
1. Baby Ben
2. The Funfair
3. Hair Wash Day
4. Dance Class
5. Losing Things
6. First Day
7. The Clown
8. Eating New Food
9. Open Wide
10. Timmy Monster
11. One Step At A Time
12. Fire Alarm
13. The Beard
14. Swing Park
15. Changing My Room
16. Museum Of Imagination
17. Sharing
18. The Party
19. The Painting Day
20. Granny No No
21. Bus Trip Ride
22. The Hospital
23. Choosing Carefully
24. Big Stomp
25. Make A Splash
26. Busy
27. The Dog
28. Supermarket
29. Haircut
30. Big Sleepover

=== Series 2 (2013) ===
1. Sandcastle
2. Birthday Present
3. Echoes
4. The Piano
5. Panda
6. Fussy
7. I Don't Smile
8. Getting Better
9. Waiting
10. Excited
11. Funny Tummy
12. The Hat
13. Chuff
14. Mountain
15. High Flying
16. Peace & Quiet
17. My Favourite Dinosaur
18. Dobbin
19. Wedding Day
20. Firework Night
21. Holding Hand
22. Subway
23. Thunder
24. Rain Or Shine
25. Shadow

=== Special episodes (10 minutes) ===
1. Holiday Special Hola (Broadcast 26 August 2013)
2. Going To School
3. Christmas Magic
4. The Play
5. Hogmanay
6. Halloween
7. Harvest Supper
