= Danielle Jam =

British actress

- Born: Aberdeen, Scotland
- Occupation: Actress
- Known for: Balamory, Molly and Mack,Scot Squad

Danielle Jam is a Scottish actress from Aberdeen, Scotland. She is best known for her roles as Ava Potts in Balamory, Daisy in Molly and Mack and PC Eleanor Hipgrave in Scot Squad.

== Career ==
Jam graduated from Queen Margaret University in 2018 with a BA (Hons) in Acting for Stage and Screen. In 2018, Jam joined the cast of CBeebies show Molly and Mack as Daisy. In 2021, Jam appeared in BBC Scotland's police comedy Scot Squad as PC Eleanor Hipgrave.

In 2025, Jam was announced as one of the new characters in the Balamory revival, as inventor Ava Potts, the daughter of character Archie The Inventor (played by Miles Jupp in the original series). Series one aired in April 2026. Jam appeared on television and radio to promote the show's return, including on BBC Radio 5 Live, BBC Breakfast with Julie Wilson Nimmo and Andrew Agnew and BBC Radio 4's Loose Ends.

Jam has appeared in multiple stage and theatre productions, including A Play, A Pie and A Pint, Oran Mor in Glasgow and ‘Dracula: Mina’s Reckoning’ a tour with National Theatre of Scotland.

Jam has been nominated for several awards throughout her career including ‘One to Watch’. Jam also appeared in ‘The List Hot 100’ 2022. ‘Dracula: Mina’s Reckoning’, touring this autumn with National Theatre of Scotland.
