= Colin McCredie =

Scottish actor

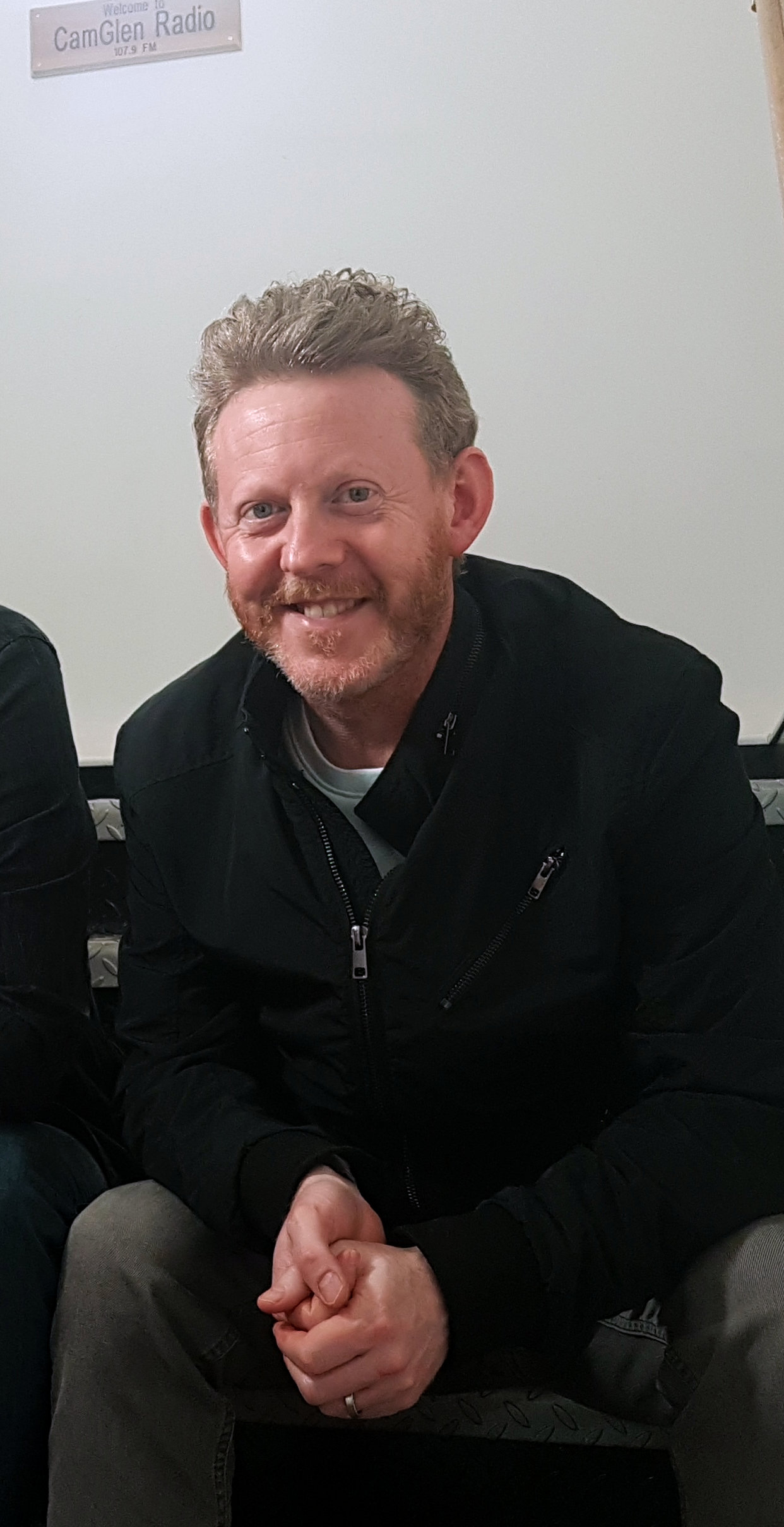
- McCredie at CamGlen Radio
- Born: June 8, 1972 (age 54); Dumbarton, Dunbartonshire, Scotland
- Occupation: Actor
- Known for: Taggart

Colin McCredie (born 8 June 1972 in Dumbarton, Scotland) is a Scottish actor, best known for his roles as DC Stuart Fraser in the STV drama Taggart and Nick Morrison in River City. His film appearances include Shallow Grave (1994) and The Missing Postman (1997).

== Biography ==
Colin grew up in Perth and began acting as a child at Perth Theatre before attending the Scottish Youth Theatre. He trained at the Royal Scottish Academy of Music and Drama in Glasgow and graduated in 1993. He joined Taggart aged 23 and appeared in over 75 episodes from 1995 to 2010.

In December 2009 McCredie was informed that he and his character would not be returning for the next series of Taggart.

On 15 October 2010, it was announced that McCredie would be joining the BBC Scotland drama River City, playing the role of Nick Morrison.

McCredie is a patron of the Scottish Youth Theatre and a supporter of his hometown football team St Johnstone, where he sponsors a player.

On 10 January 2011 it was announced that McCredie would be joining Sharleen Spiteri and Dawn Steele in the forthcoming Scottish film Between Weathers. He appeared in the BBC Radio 4 Afternoon Play Care by Clara Glynn, and also as the Dad in the CBeebies series Woolly and Tig which stars his daughter Betsy and sister-in-law Jenny Ryan and is made by Tattiemoon, the makers of Balamory.

He played Alan McCombes in the Tommy Sheridan play I, Tommy by Ian Pattison at The Gilded Balloon Edinburgh in August and at King's Theatre, Glasgow in November 2012.

== Television ==
- Woolly and Tig - Tattiemoon for CBeebies
- River City - BBC Scotland
- Taggart - STV Productions
- The Missing Postman - BBC Scotland
- The Pen - BBC Scotland Tartan Short
- Karmic Mothers - BBC Scotland Tartan Short
- Dr. Finlay - played Gerald Hynde
- Take the High Road
- The Holy City - played Patrick
- The Justice Game - played Mickey
- Takin' Over the Asylum - played Phil
- Mayflies - Scott

== Theatre ==
- I Tommy - played Alan McCombes (Gilded Balloon Edinburgh and King's Theatre Glasgow)
- The Ching Room - played Rory (Glasgow Oranmor, Edinburgh Traverse and Manchester Royal Exchange)
- Lysistrata - played Lysistrata (Glasgow Oranmor)
- The Corstorphine Road Nativity - played Wise Frankencense (Edinburgh Festival Theatre)
- Dealer's Choice - played Mugsy (Tron Theatre Company)
- Candide - played Candide (Suspect Culture Tour)
- Passing Places - played Brian (Traverse Theatre)
- Teechers - played Salty - (Byre Theatre)
- Glengarry Glen Ross - played Lingk (Arches Theatre)

== Film ==
- Night is Day - played Taylor, in post-production (2011)
- The Perpetual Twilight of Gregor Black - (Cliffhanger Films)
- Pandaemonium - played Royal Messenger (Mariner Films)
- Small Faces - played Doug (Skyline)
- Shallow Grave - played Cameron (Figment Films)
- The Last Bus - played Graham Ogilvy

== Radio ==
- Care - BBC Radio 4 March 2011 - played Charlie Fleming
