= Molly and Mack =

British children's television series

- Genre: Children's
- Created by: Peter Hynes
- Written by: Georgia Lock (series 1–2) Phil Redmond (series 3–5)
- Directed by: Adrian Mead (lead director)
- Starring: Mimi Robertson; Joshua Haynes
- Theme music composer: Ellie Wyatt
- Composer: Paul Honey
- Country of origin: United Kingdom
- Original language: English
- No. of series: 5
- No. of episodes: 100 + 1 special

Production
- Executive producer: Sara Harkins
- Running time: 14 mins.
- Production company: BBC Children's Productions

Original release
- Network: CBeebies (2018–2022) BBC One (2018–2019)
- Release: 12 November 2018 – 25 November 2022

Molly and Mack was a British children's television series that aired on CBeebies from November 2018 to November 2022. It also aired on ABC Kids in Australia.

Some episodes of Molly and Mack get repeated on BBC One during 2018 and 2019 "as part of CBeebies on One children’s morning block".

== Premise ==
The series centred around an 11-year-old girl named Molly (played by Mimi Robertson) who spends the summer helping her 19-year-old brother Mack (played by Joshua Haynes) at a toy stall in The Big Hub, a community hall in the fictional Scottish town of Bridgetown.

The Big Hub, managed by Moira (played by Maureen Carr), is where a variety of stallholders hold an array of permanent market stalls including a gift stall run by Alice (played by Katrina Bryan), a fruit and vegetable stall run by resident handyman Bob (played by Steven McNicoll) and a café stall run by Mrs Juniper (played by Alison Peebles).

The kids club at The Big Hub is managed by Molly and Mack's widower father James (played by James Mackenzie). James is regularly seen supervising a number of children including Molly's friends, Suki (played by Miko Hanley), Magnus (played by Ethan Rowley) and Ruby (played by Freya Reid).

Mack's girlfriend Daisy (played by Danielle Jam) works at a nearby veterinary surgery.

=== Songs ===
During each episode, there are always two songs performed as a regular problem-solving plot device. When identifying a problem, Molly sings The Idea Song where she proposes a solution as a way to solve the problem, before another character performs The Oops Song when something goes wrong during the solution.

The theme and songs were written by Ellie Wyatt, with the incidental score by Paul Honey, with folk and traditional music influences and performed by an acoustic band including piano, acoustic guitars, violin and flute.

== Episodes ==
Series	Episodes	Originally aired	
Series	Episodes	First aired	Last aired
1	20	12 November 2018	3 December 2018
2	20	4 November 2019	25 November 2019
Christmas special		9 December 2019	
3	20	28 June 2021	23 July 2021
4	20	15 November 2021	6 December 2021
5	20	31 October 2022	25 November 2022

== Production ==
With a multicultural cast, Molly and Mack is filmed in Govan in Glasgow and North Queensferry in Fife, with the Forth Bridge being used as a centrepiece for the fictional Bridgetown. The bridge is heavily featured in the opening sequence of the show, in various on-location shots and promotional material for the series. The building featured as "The Hub" is in Maxwell Park and is called Pollokshields Burgh Hall.
