= Scot Squad =

Scottish television series

- Title card as appeared in Series 8
- Genre: Sitcom; Mockumentary
- Created by: Joe Hullait
- Directed by: Iain Davidson
- Starring: James Allenby-Kirk; Karen Bartke; Darren Connell; Jack Docherty; Julie Wilson Nimmo; Louise McCarthy; Chris Forbes; Grado; Stuart McPherson; Sally Reid; Manjot Sumal; Ashley Smith; ML Stone; Jordan Young
- Narrated by: Joe Hullait
- Country of origin: Scotland
- Original languages: English; Scots
- No. of series: 8
- No. of episodes: 51

Production
- Executive producers: Rab Christie; Gavin Smith
- Producer: Iain Davidson
- Camera setup: Multi-camera
- Running time: 30 minutes
- Production companies: The Comedy Unit; BBC Scotland

Original release
- Network: BBC One Scotland (2014–2017); BBC Scotland (2019–2023); BBC iPlayer (Chief's Christmas Message)
- Release: 27 October 2014 – 2 February 2023

Scot Squad is a Scottish television mockumentary series about a fictional Scottish police force, made in a fly on the wall style. The show first aired on 27 October 2014 on BBC One Scotland. The show has aired seven series, including specials, on the channel. As of series 8, which began on 5 January 2023, the show airs on BBC Scotland channel. The show is directed by Iain Davidson and is narrated by Joe Hullait. Former Absolutely star Jack Docherty plays the fictional force's police chief.

In November 2017, a special crossover episode made for Children in Need featured several of the show's characters meeting characters from Scottish soap opera River City.

== Cast and characters ==
- Jack Docherty as Chief Commissioner Cameron Miekelson (pronounced /ˈmiːkəlsən/). Miekelson is a competent Chief Commissioner, but he can occasionally be out of touch with modern values and technology. He also has a huge ego and an inflated sense of his abilities. In his free time, Miekelson enjoys writing; he has written a series of books about a police officer named Michael Cameronson. He is also regularly seen talking to his secretary, Jean (who is not seen or heard by viewers). He is also a supporter of Hibernian F.C. and fan of Lulu. He hates the fire service and brands them lazy and irresponsible.
- James Allenby-Kirk as Volunteer Officer later Acting Sergeant Ken Beattie. Though he devotes enormous amounts of his personal time to helping people in need of police assistance, Ken is often abused and mistreated by the public. He also has an unfortunate habit of unknowingly assisting drug dealers.
- Jordan Young as PC Jack McLaren. Jack is a stereotypical ladies' man, with anxiety, often flirting with women on the job. He enjoys breaking down doors and his extensive physical fitness routines often help him to catch runaway criminals.
- Sally Reid as PC Sarah Fletcher. Sarah is Jack's partner. She is usually very cool-headed and reasonable, as opposed to Douls, whose temper often flares up at the slightest provocation. Sarah has been an official face of the unified Scottish Police Force, which makes Jack jealous.
- Karen Bartke as Sergeant Karen Ann Millar. "Officer Karen" is the desk sergeant. She is often found dealing with Bobby, the young man who often comes into her office with queries (which frequently have little to do with police work). In Series 6, she gains an apprentice named Sharon McKelvie.
- Ashley Smith as PC Jane MacKay. One half of the rural police team (seemingly based in the Trossachs), Jane is getting used to the slower-paced country lifestyle. She seems to be unaware of her partner Charlie's fondness for her, often completely misreading his attempts to tell her how he feels. In Series 6, Jane transfers to the city and in Series 7 is given a new partner named Laura Washington. In the fourth episode of Series 7, Jane returns to working with Charlie.
- Chris Forbes as PC Charlie McIntosh. Charlie hails from the rural area he polices, and is enthralled by Jane's tales of the city. He also had an unrequited crush on her. Charlie is a huge fan of the musicians Enya and Phil Cunningham, and is a keen accordionist. In Series 7, following Jane's move to the city, Charlie is given a new partner, the eccentric Sergeant Napier Carmicheal. In the fourth episode of Series 7, Carmicheal quits to work at the local Outward Bond centre and is replaced by a returning Jane.
- Grado as PC Hugh McKirdy. One of the two traffic officers, McKirdy is often prone to tomfoolery and hungry on the job, sometimes failing to properly apprehend criminals whose crimes amuse him. He will often sneak off to Doner Kebab shops instead of questioning.
- Manjot Sumal as PC Surjit Singh. McKirdy's long-suffering partner is a very no-nonsense by-the-book officer who has no qualms about stepping in and correcting his mistakes.
- M.L. Stone as Maggie LeBeau. Maggie takes calls from the public, who often bombard her with ludicrous complaints and tales.
- Darren Connell as Bobby Muir. A well-meaning but very dim-witted man heavily implied to be on the autism spectrum who visits "Officer Karen" on a regular basis with various questions and complaints, almost none of which have anything to do with crime or police work. Bobby lives with his Uncle Jeffy and his dog, Fridge. He has appeared in all series apart from series 7.
- Julie Wilson Nimmo as DC Megan Squire
- Louise McCarthy as DC Andrea McGill. Megan's inexperienced partner.
- Stuart MacPherson as Archie Pepper. The computer expert who comes from Fife. He later gains a partner named Annie McInnis.
- James Devoy as Sgt Ray McCoy. The resident close protection officer, assigned to VIPs.
- Phoebe Connolly as PC Sharon McKelvie. Introduced in Series 6, she previously worked in customer services before joining the police force and is Karen's apprentice.
- Kenny Boyle as Detective Marvin Starke. Introduced in Series 7. A murder mystery actor who poses as a real detective to get away with committing crimes.
- Andrew John Tait as Sergeant Napier Carmichael. Introduced in Series 7, he replaces Jane MacKay as Charlie's partner. In the fourth episode of Series 7, he quits to work at the local Outward Bound centre.
- Neshla Caplan as PC Laura Washington. Introduced in Series 7, she replaces Charlie McIntosh as Jane's partner until Jane moves back to the country to work with Charlie again.
- Amy Matthews as Annie McInnis. Introduced in Series 6, she is from Essex and serves as Archie's partner.
- Andrew Agnew as Walter. Introduced in Series 7, he is a man who works at the local community centre. Sharon and Karen meet him occasionally and deal with his reports as to what is happening, usually relating to the centre being defaced.
- Matt Costello as DS Gordon Longstaff. Introduced in Series 7. A cold case expert who is a colleague of Megan Squire and Andrea McGill. He has a weak stomach and is known to gag when told of the details of victims deaths.
- Joe Hullait as the Narrator

== Episodes ==
=== Pilot (2012) ===
A pilot of the spoof show was broadcast in November 2012. A full series was made in 2014.

=== Series One (2014) ===
Series One was broadcast in 2014. It starred James Allenby-Kirk, Karen Bartke, Darren Connell, Jack Docherty, Chris Forbes, Grado, Sally Reid, Ashley Smith, M.L. Stone, Manjot Sumal, and Jordan Young, while Hullait acted as the narrator. Connell was nominated for 'Best Actor' at the 2015 BAFTA Scotland New Talent Awards for his portrayal of Bobby Muir.

=== Series Two (2015) ===
The second series began transmission in October 2015.

=== Series Three (2016-2017) ===
The third series comprised six more episodes and a Christmas special. The Christmas special preceded the series, airing in December 2016. The series commenced in January 2017.

=== Series Four (2017) ===
The fourth series comprises six episodes and was broadcast from 15 November to 20 December 2017. BBC Scotland Only. Several new characters were added in this series - detectives DC Megan Squire and DC Andrea McGill, IT investigator Archie Pepper and Sergeant Ray McCoy.

=== Series Five (2019) ===
Shooting for series five started in June 2018. Series five started airing on 4 April 2019.

=== Series Six (2021) ===
Series six started airing in January 2021.

=== Series Seven (2022) ===
Series seven started airing in January 2022.

=== Series Eight (2023) ===
Series eight started airing in January 2023. It was also the show's final series.

=== Specials ===
==== Scot Squad: The Chief's Election Interviews (2019) ====
A one-off special which aired on BBC Scotland on 4 December 2019. It featured Chief Commissioner Cameron Miekelson interviewing Scottish party leaders.

==== Scot Squad: The Chief Does The New Normal (2020) ====
On 5 August 2020, a one off episode on BBC IPlayer showed Chief Cameron Miekelson giving viewers tips about embracing the new normal during the easing of the COVID-19 lockdown in Scotland.

==== The Chief's Festive Message (2020) ====
On 24 December 2020, BBC Scotland aired a short episode in which Chief Commissioner Cameron Miekelson gives a festive message.

==== The Chief Does Democracy (2021) ====
On 29 April 2021, before the public went to the polls, BBC Scotland aired a one hour episode in which Chief Commissioner Cameron Miekelson grilled party leaders and examined what the notion of democracy means today.

==== Euros Special (2021) ====
On 6 June 2021, BBC Scotland aired a 28 minute episode in which the squad get the game face on to see some action in the field, on the road, online and on the beat.

==== Hogmanay Special (2021) ====
On 31 December 2021, a Hogmanay special of the series aired on BBC One Scotland where it showed the force doing their New Year shifts.

== Spin-off series ==
=== Scotland Unsolved (2019) ===
==== Cast ====
- Julie Wilson Nimmo as D.C. Megan Squire
- Louise McCarthy as D.C. Andrea McGill

==== Episodes ====
- Episode 1
- Episode 2
- Episode 3

=== Scot Squad: The Chief Does Edinburgh (2019) ===
==== Cast ====
- Jack Doherty as Chief Cameron Miekelson

==== Episodes ====
- Episode 1: The Chief Does Edinburgh's History
- Episode 2: The Chief Does Edinburgh's Literature
- Episode 3: The Chief Does Edinburgh's Geography

=== The Chief ===
Announced on 30 January 2024, this series follows Chief Cameron Miekelson at work and home as he tries his best to remain relevant in an ever-changing world. Two series of four episodes each were broadcast in 2025 and 2026.

==== Cast ====
- Jack Doherty as Chief Commissioner Cameron Miekelson
- Dylan Blore as Paul Weir, Miekelson's assistant
- Carmen Pieraccini as Deputy Chief Commissioner Katriona Muldoon
- Beruce Khan as Assistant Deputy Chief Commissioner Rohan Rivani
- Lana Pheutan as Lyndsey McLeod, Head of HR & Equity, Diversity & Inclusion
- Eilidh Loan as Ellen Miekelson, Miekelson's daughter
- Rhona Cameron as Una Struan MSP, the Justice Secretary
