= Buki Akib =

British actress and fashion designer

- Born: 2 January 1979 (age 47); Lagos, Nigeria
- Occupations: Fashion designer, actress (formerly)
- Years active: 2002–present
- Known for: Balamory

Buki Akib (born 2 January 1979) is a British-Nigerian fashion designer and former actress. Trained at the Italia Conti Academy of Theatre Arts, she portrayed Josie Jump in the children's television programme Balamory between 2002 and 2004. After filming two series of the show, she was unable to return for the third as filming clashed with her studying for an arts degree at Central Saint Martins. She was replaced by Kasia Haddad.

Since 2010, Akib has owned her own fashion label, Not Just a Label. Her work has appeared in magazines and been featured in exhibitions in London and New York.
