= Balamory =

Scottish television series (2002–2005, 2026–)

- Opening title card from the revival series
- Genre: Children's television series
- Created by: Brian Jameson
- Developed by: BBC Broadcast; Yvonne Jennings
- Starring: Julie Wilson Nimmo; Juliet Cadzow; Andrew Agnew; Kim Tserkezie; Miles Jupp; Buki Akib (S1-2); Kasia Haddad (S3-4); Rodd Christensen; Mary Riggans; Danielle Jam; Carl Spencer
- Opening theme: "What's the Story in Balamory?"
- Ending theme: "What's the Story in Balamory?" (Reprise) (original series) "What's the Story in Balamory?" (Instrumental) (revival series)
- Composers: Jane McLaughlin; Paul Wilson; Gregor Philp; Foss Paterson; Colin Winston Fletcher; Jim Muotune; David Scott; Matt Katz
- Country of origin: United Kingdom (Scotland)
- Original language: English
- No. of series: 4 (Original); 2 (Revival)
- No. of episodes: 254 (original series, including Christmas Special); 20 (revival series)

Production
- Executive producer: Brian Jameson
- Running time: 19–22 minutes 28–30 minutes (specials); 14 minutes (revival series)
- Production companies: BBC Scotland (original series); Tattiemoon (Seeking Santa special); Lion Television Scotland (revival series)

Original release
- Network: CBeebies
- Release: 2 September 2002 – 29 June 2005
- Network: CBeebies, BBC iPlayer
- Release: 20 April 2026 – present

Related
- Me Too!

Balamory is a Scottish live-action children's programme created by Brian Jameson for BBC Scotland. The show, promoted by the BBC as being the "world's first soap for pre-school children", centres on a fictional small island community off the west coast of Scotland and deals with the residents of the community and their issues.

Originally lasting for four series and 254 episodes (including a DVD-exclusive Christmas special), Balamory aired on CBeebies from 2002 until 2005. Upon its initial premiere, the series was a big ratings success for the then-newly launched channel, and by the beginning of 2004, was promoted as being the most successful in-house pre-school program produced by the BBC since Teletubbies. Following its initial cancellation in 2005, the BBC commissioned two new series in September 2024 for a 2026 broadcast window to be produced by Lion Television Scotland.

== Synopsis ==
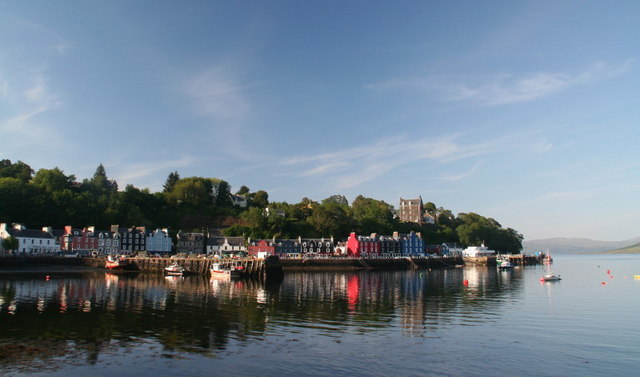
Tobermory, Mull, the setting for the fictional town of Balamory

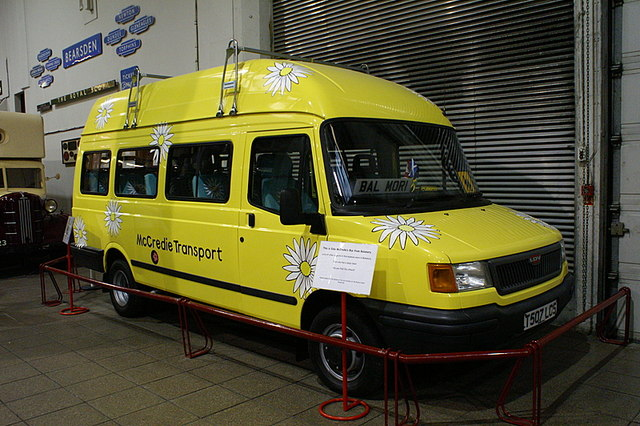
Edie McCredie's bus (LDV Convoy) in the Glasgow Museum of Transport

The series uses a bridge-style format, with Miss Hoolie acting as the bridge-in-gap for the main portion of the episode. A creative aspect of the programme involves the characters often being "one step behind" the audience when it comes to problem-solving. This allows for young, inquisitive viewers to figure out "what the story is" in Balamory based on their interpretations. Miss Hoolie directly talks to the viewers watching, recapping for them the episode's moral and how the characters would accomplish it.

The opening credits show the town of "Balamory" with its brightly coloured houses and residents. Miss Hoolie opens the nursery school, greets the nursery children, and talks about that day's weather. On a "play day" she visits Penny Pocket and Suzie Sweet, they live at the village shop/café called Pocket & Sweet.

One of the other characters (who will be the main character of that episode) tells Miss Hoolie about a problem. This character then sings "Which Coloured House Are We Going To?" (from Series 5 onwards, a different version is sung: "Which Coloured House?"), asking the young viewers to guess which of the Balamory characters will be most helpful in solving the problem. The main character then proceeds to visit several other characters until the problem is solved. Miss Hoolie and the main character provide a summary of the story at each point, and a final recap at the end of the episode.

For example, in one episode, Josie Jump has been asked to look after a neighbour's rabbit, but does not know what it needs. She is advised to visit PC Plum, who recommends that she feed it vegetables. She then goes to the shop run by Pocket & Sweet to buy rabbit food, and finally brings the rabbit to Miss Hoolie's nursery for the children to feed and pet it.

Each episode of Balamory contains at least four songs:

- "What's the Story in Balamory?", the theme song.
- Miss Hoolie's opening song, either "Everybody, Everyone" if the nursery school is open (series 1–present), or one of the two "play day" songs otherwise (series 1–4).
- "Which Coloured House Are We Going To?" / "Which Coloured House?", sung by the main character after presenting their problem.
- Character-specific songs, sung by the characters visited by the main character.

== Characters ==
There were eight central characters in Balamory from 2002–2005. From 2026 onwards, there are now only seven central characters, but in each series, each character wears a distinctive colour of clothing and lives in a house of the same colour.

One of the original Balamory title cards used between 2002 and 2005

=== Original Characters ===
- Miss Hoolie (played by Julie Wilson Nimmo; 2002–present) – The Balamory Nursery teacher. She is the main character and serves as both presenter and narrator for each episode. Her main colour is green and she lives in a green cottage.
- PC Plum (played by Andrew Agnew; 2002–present) – The local police officer. He aspires to be a master detective, but since Balamory is a crime-free village, he mostly spends his time watching wildlife. His main colour is white (although he wears a mostly black police uniform) and he lives in a white police station.
- Penny Pocket (played by Kim Tserkezie; 2002–present) – Part-owner of Balamory's café-shop, Pocket and Sweet. She uses a wheelchair and has a talent for mathematics and organisation. In the original series, Penny's main colour was cyan. In the revival, her main colour is red and she now solely runs the shop and café herself, having renamed it to Penny's. On 29 July 2025, Tserkezie was interviewed on Reporting Scotland during a Balamory filming break, in a red costume to honour Riggans' memory.
- Edie McCredie (played by Juliet Cadzow; 2002–present) – The Balamory bus driver. She has travelled all over the world, and has a variety of photographs and souvenirs from her travels to talk about. She is also an expert driver and motor mechanic, and occasionally gets exasperated with other road users. She has a video camera, which is put to use should the occasion arise, notably in "The Wedding" and "Indian Wedding". Her main colour is blue, and she lives in a blue garage. In the revival, she is now a delivery driver and pilots a pleasure boat called The Sea Dasher. Although she's still part of the main cast, she now makes fewer recurring appearances and doesn't have any episodes where she's the main focus, similar to the Harbour Master.
- Suzie Sweet (played by Mary Riggans; 2002–2005) – The other part-owner of Pocket and Sweet, who regularly worked alongside her best friend, Penny Pocket. She was a grandmother figure who loved to tell customers about the items in her shop, and had a talent for cooking and baking. Her main colour was red.
- Josie Jump (played by Buki Akib; 2002–2003, excluding The Snowflake Fairy and Kasia Haddad; The Snowflake Fairy and 2004–2005) – A fitness instructor who played and coached all types of gymnastics, sports and dance and was also talented at storytelling through expressive movement and dance. Her main colour was yellow and she lived in a yellow towered house.
- Archie the Inventor (played by Miles Jupp; 2002–2005) – An inventor who would build zany creations from household objects (often yoghurt pots), which were intended to be useful, but would sometimes backfire. His main colour was pink and he lived in a pink castle.
- Spencer the Painter (played by Rodd Christensen; 2002–2005) – An African-American painter who was responsible for making Balamory as colourful as it is and was also talented with music, especially as his painter's ladder was musical; each rung sounding a different note. His main colour was orange and he lived in an orange bungalow.

=== Revival Characters ===
- Ava Potts (played by Danielle Jam; 2026–present) – A scientist and inventor who is the daughter of Archie. Similarly to her father, some of her inventions are prone to backfiring.
- Dr Ollie (played by Carl Spencer; 2026–present) – A veterinarian who lives with his two children, Hamish and Bonnie.
- Hamish & Bonnie (played by Seth Isikaiye; 2026–present, and Alexandra Wilkie; 2026–present) – The recurring son and daughter of Dr Ollie.
- Harbourmaster (played by William Andrews; 2026–present) – The owner of the Balamory harbour, who provides comedic relief during the series. He is a recurring character.

Miss Hoolie, PC Plum, Penny Pocket, and Edie McCredie also reprise their roles from the original series, and they're the only four central characters to appear in every series of the original series and revival.

A number of episodes feature guest actors in addition to the main characters and the nursery children. Terry Wogan made a guest appearance in one episode ("The Game Show") as a television director. This episode also featured Greg Hemphill (Julie Wilson Nimmo's husband in real life) and John Altman, who played Nick Cotton in the BBC soap opera EastEnders. Celebrity chef Keith Floyd was also seen in Suzie Sweet's song "Suzie's Cookin'".

=== Cast timeline ===
‡ Appeared in one episode of Series 2, "The Snow Flake Fairy".

== Songs ==
In every episode, a selection of songs are played; each depends on the character.

Beginning in Series 3, a new selection of songs was introduced, although they were still used in tandem with the original songs (except for the "play day" song from Series 1 and 2). Also, Penny Pocket and Suzie Sweet, who originally shared a song, were given standalone songs. Josie Jump's original song was redone with Kasia Haddad, who took over from Buki Akib as Josie; with one shot from Archie, and Suzie and Penny's original songs (along with most shots from Edie's original song) also being changed to accommodate this change. In addition, the "nursery" song was given new verses, which were used interchangeably with the original.

All characters, except Miss Hoolie, sing the Coloured House song one at a time per episode. Penny and Suzie have sung this song both individually and together. Miss Hoolie sang it only once as a duet with Josie.

The songs were originally composed by Foster Paterson and Paul Wilson. Matt Katz was tasked with re-composing numerous tracks from Series 1–4 for Series 5 (and composing many original tracks for the show's revival), both of which are stylistically different from the original series.

- "What's the Story in Balamory?" – title theme (Series 1–present)
- "Which Coloured House Are We Going To?" – transition theme (Series 1–4)
- "Which Coloured House?" – transition theme (Series 5–present)
- "Everybody, Everyone" – Miss Hoolie's "nursery" theme (Series 1–present)
- "Everyone's at Home Today" – Miss Hoolie's "play day" theme (Series 1–2)
- "Strike Up the Band" – Miss Hoolie's "play day" theme (Series 3–4)
- "I'm PC Plum" – PC Plum's theme (Series 1–3, 5–present)
- "Follow the Clue" – PC Plum's theme (Series 3–4)
- "I'm Suzie Sweet, I'm Penny Pocket" – Suzie and Penny's theme (Series 1–4)
- "Suzie's Cookin'" – Suzie's theme (Series 3–4)
- "Sort It" – Penny's theme (Series 3–4)
- "Busy, Busy, Busy" – Penny's theme (Series 5–present)
- "When I Honk My Horn" – Edie McCredie's theme (Series 1–4)
- "Let Me Take You on a Journey" – Edie McCredie's theme (Series 3–4)
- "I'm Archie, the Inventor" – Archie's theme (Series 1–4)
- "Great Inventions, Groovy Solutions" – Archie's theme (Series 3–4)
- "Jump Up a Little Higher" – Josie Jump's theme (Series 1–4)
- "Cheer You Up" – Josie Jump's theme (Series 3–4)
- "Climbing Up My Musical Ladder" – Spencer's theme (Series 1–4)
- "If You Need a Little Rhythm" – Spencer's theme (Series 3–4)
- "I'm Ava Potts" – Ava Potts' theme (Series 5–present)
- "Dr Ollie!" – Dr Ollie's theme (Series 5–present)
- "What was the Story in Balamory?" – Miss Hoolie's closing theme (Series 5–present)
- "What's the Story in Balamory?" (Reprise) – end credits theme (Series 1–4)
- "What's the Story in Balamory?" (Instrumental) – end credits theme (Series 5–present)

== Series overview ==
Series	Episodes	Originally released	
Series	Episodes	First released	Last released
1	64	2 September 2002	25 December 2002
2	63	7 April 2003	2 July 2003
3	63	20 September 2004	15 December 2004
4	64	4 April 2005	7 November 2005
5	10	20 April 2026	1 May 2026
6	10	12 October 2026	23 October 2026

== Audience ==
The programme is aimed at pre-schoolers, although often reached an older audience. The show can also be seen in a humorous light. The characters in Balamory are somewhat naive and lighthearted. The storyline revolves around simple problems designed to challenge pre-schoolers' minds.

== Production ==
The show was first confirmed to be in production on 20 November 2001, under the working title of Apple Cross before the title Balamory was announced in August 2002. Producers wanted a title that rhymed with Tobermory, as well as a title that rhymed with Story. An unaired test pilot named Applecross was filmed. No plotline is known, since the production was never released to the public.

=== Filming locations ===
Balamory was filmed mostly in Tobermory on the Isle of Mull, with the exception of scenes at Archie's castle filmed at Fenton Tower in East Lothian. Other scenes such as the nursery and the Mainland City, were filmed in Glasgow.

The nursery was part of North Glasgow College in Barmulloch for series 1 and 2, which was then knocked down. In series 3 and 4, the nursery was a custom-built set outside the BBC studios in Maryhill.

== Cancellation ==
On 30 April 2005, the BBC announced that it would not order another series, citing that it wanted to experiment and create more new programme ideas. The show continued to be repeated on CBeebies until 3 July 2016. By then, only the first two series (except the last episode of Series 2) continued to be repeated, as the last two series, as well as the last episode of Series 2, could not be repeated owing to licensing issues from 22 January 2010 onwards.

By the time the programme was cancelled, many of the cast were also keen to move on. Miles Jupp, who played Archie, stated that the fame from his role was causing problems in his comedy career, with parents taking their children to his stand-up routine at the Edinburgh Fringe on the presumption that it was age-appropriate. Julie Wilson Nimmo, who played Miss Hoolie, complained that she could not take her children to the local play area without being "mobbed". Mary Riggans, who played Suzie Sweet, died in 2013. Andrew Agnew, who played PC Plum, went on to work for Tattiemoon Productions and direct the children's TV show Me Too!, which shared similarities in concept with Balamory.

== Revival ==
On 17 September 2024, the BBC announced that the show would be revived for a two-series run of twenty episodes (with each series consisting of 10 episodes), and would premiere on CBeebies in 2026. The revival was announced to feature old and new characters, and would be filmed in Scotland as before, although it would be uncertain whether it would be filmed in Tobermory. On 28 January 2025, it was announced that under the BBC's "competitive tender" policy, the revival would be produced by All3Media subsidiary Lion Television Scotland.

On 18 July 2025, the BBC officially announced that Nimmo, Agnew, Tserkezie and Cadzow would reprise their roles as Miss Hoolie, PC Plum, Penny Pocket and Edie McCredie, respectively. Three new cast members and their characters were also revealed; Danielle Jam as the scientist and inventor Ava Potts, William Andrews as the Harbourmaster, and Carl Spencer as local veterinarian Dr Ollie. Filming began at the end of the month, officially confirming that the revival would still be recorded in Tobermory. Nimmo has called the revival "a love letter to the original".

On 7 April 2026, it was announced that the first series of the revival would premiere on 20 April on CBeebies and BBC iPlayer.

On 28 May 2026, the BBC announced that the series had been commissioned for a third and fourth series.

On 8 October 2026, it was announced that Banijay Rights had secured global distribution rights to the revival. Banijay also acquired global licensing rights to the property, including consumer products, live events, and digital exploitation.

== International airings ==
The series has been aired in many international territories. Such examples include Nickelodeon (Nick Jr.) in Australia, RTÉ in Ireland, BBC Kids in Canada, TVB in Hong Kong, and BBC Prime for most European territories. The series also aired in Japan on BBC Japan.

On 4 August 2005, BBC Worldwide Americas pre-sold US broadcast rights to thirty-nine episodes to Discovery Communications, who also secured US merchandising rights. The series aired on Discovery Kids and TLC as part of their Ready Set Learn! strand.

The series has been aired by the Dutch broadcaster TROS.

== Merchandising ==
In 2005, BBC Worldwide announced that more than twenty-one licensees were producing products based on the series., including Vivid Imaginations as the show's master toy partner, Ravensburger for wooden puzzles, Flair for wooden toys, Character World for bedding, and Trumark for tableware.

=== Home media and streaming ===
In the United Kingdom, BBC Worldwide and later 2 Entertain released VHS and DVDs of the series, commonly focusing on a specific character or theme. One such volume was the show's debut release: "Mysteries with PC Plum". Released on 17 November 2003, it contained three/four episodes focusing on PC Plum. The DVD topped the BBC's children's sales charts upon its release, selling 21,000 copies within its first week and becoming their best-selling new release title of the year.

Another volume released for the series was Seeking Santa, released on 7 November 2005, which contained a special direct-to-video Christmas episode of the same name, alongside an extended version of the series 2 episode The Snowflake Fairy.

Other volumes for the series that were released over the year included Archie's Inventions, Dancing Party, Panto and Other Stories, Jump with Josie, Daisy Bus Days, Games and Fun with Everyone, and a compilation containing the Seeking Santa and Panto DVDs.

To celebrate the show's 20th anniversary, 25 episodes from Series 4 were added to BBC iPlayer on 30 August 2022, followed by a further 20 episodes approximately two years later.

=== Software ===
On 24 November 2003, BBC Worldwide division BBC Multimedia announced that it would publish a PC CD-ROM title based on the series for 2004. Released on 27 February 2004, the CD-ROM contains a selection of minigames based on each of the show's characters.

=== Live tours ===
On 24 June 2004, BBC Worldwide announced that a live arena tour based on the series: Balamory Live: What's the Story? would tour Aberdeen, Cardiff and Glasgow for the 2004 Christmas season. It was co-produced with DC Entertainment.

On 29 April 2005, a second arena tour was announced by BBC Worldwide as a farewell to the series: Balamory Live: Strike Up the Band, which toured the UK during the autumn of 2005. The show's cast reprised their roles except for Julie Wilson Nimmo, who owing to being on maternity leave expecting a child, was replaced with Michele Gallagher as Miss Hoolie.

== Awards ==
- Best Pre-school Live Action Series (nominated) at the 2003 BAFTA Children's Awards.
- Best Pre-school Live Action Series (won) at the 2004 BAFTA Children's Awards.
- Best Pre-school Live Action Series (nominated) at the 2005 BAFTA Children's Awards.
