= William Andrews (comedian) =

British actor and comedian

- Born: 10 October 1977 (age 49); Salisbury, Rhodesia (now Harare, Zimbabwe)
- Spouse: Anna Crilly

Comedy career
- Medium: Stand-up comedy, television

William Andrews (born 10 October 1977 in Salisbury, now Harare, in the former British colony Rhodesia, now Zimbabwe) is a British actor and comedian.

Andrews attended Edinburgh College of Art, where he gained a Bachelor of Arts in Photography.

He won The Tap Water Awards for character standup comedy in the 2003 Edinburgh Fringe Festival performing as Tony Carter, a luckless Geordie. In 2007 he won a Scottish BAFTA for his role in the television show Blowout.

He stars in the BBC TV children's comedy series Sorry, I've Got No Head, alongside David Armand, James Bachman, Marcus Brigstocke, Anna Crilly, Justin Edwards, Mel Giedroyc, Marek Larwood and Nick Mohammed. He also starred in Pixelface. William Andrews is a board member of The Alternative Comedy Memorial Society.

In 2022, he appeared as Josiah in an episode of Series 4 of Ghosts.

It was announced that Andrews would play the Harbour Master in a revival series of BBC children’s television programme Balamory in 2026.

== Personal ==
Andrews is married to British actress and comedian Anna Crilly.
