= Carl Spencer =

English actor (born 1993)

- Born: Carl Anthony Spencer; 1993 (age 32–33); Wandsworth, London
- Occupation: Actor
- Years active: 2013–present

Carl Anthony Spencer (born 1993) is an English actor. His television credits include Doctors (2022) and Queenie (2024), whilst his film roles include Rocketman (2019), Matilda the Musical (2022) and The Hunger Games: The Ballad of Songbirds & Snakes. He has also appeared on stage in productions including The Scottsboro Boys, Hamilton, Motown, Joseph and the Amazing Technicolor Dreamcoat. In 2026, he joined the cast of the revival of CBeebies children's television series Balamory as Dr. Ollie.

== Life and career ==
Carl Anthony Spencer was born in 1993 in Wandsworth, London and began his career on stage, appearing as Andy Wright in the musical The Scottsboro Boys and Vladimir in Dear Edwina in 2013. He subsequently went on to appear in the film Rocketman, as well as in an episode of Doctors in 2019. In 2022, he appeared as an escapologist in Matilda the Musical. In 2023, he appeared in the films Luther: The Fallen Sun and The Hunger Games: The Ballad of Songbirds & Snakes, as well as short films titled The Right Candidate and The Doll's House. In 2024, Spencer appeared in the film My Bloody Galentine and was in an episode of the Channel 4 series Queenie. In 2025, he appeared as Vinnie Ramirez in Dubbel zes. Spencer's stage credits include Hamilton, Motown, Joseph and the Amazing Technicolor Dreamcoat and The Scottsboro Boys.

In 2026, Spencer joined the cast of CBeebies children's television series Balamory following its revival. Spencer portrayed the role of Dr. Ollie, the local vet.

== Filmography ==
Year	Title	Role	Notes
2019	Rocketman	Richard	Film role
2019	Doctors	Phoenix	Episode: "Yellow"
2022	First Footing	Truman	1 episode
2022	Matilda the Musical	Escapologist	Film role
2023	Luther: The Fallen Sun	Jamal – Assault Squad	Film role
2023	The Right Candidate	Tony	Short film
2023	The Hunger Games: The Ballad of Songbirds & Snakes	Smiley	Film role
2023	The Doll's House	Miles	Short film
2024	My Bloody Galentine	Ade	Film role
2024	Queenie	Young Wilfred	Episode: "She's Royal"
2025	Dubbel zes	Vinnie Ramirez	Film role
2026–present	Balamory	Dr. Ollie	Main role

== Stage ==
Year	Title	Role	Ref.
2013–2014	The Scottsboro Boys	Andy Wright / 1st Cover Tambo	
2013	Dear Edwina	Vladimir	
2014	Annie	Rooster	
2017	Motown: The Musical	Marvin Gaye	
2019	Joseph and the Amazing Technicolor Dreamcoat	Brother	
2019	Hamilton	John Laurens / Philip Hamilton	
