= Mary Riggans =

Scottish actress (1935–2013)

- Born: 19 July 1935; Clydebank, Dunbartonshire, Scotland
- Died: 2 December 2013 (aged 78); Edinburgh, Scotland
- Occupation: Actress
- Years active: 1946-2013
- Notable work: Balamory; Still Game; Take the High Road

Mary Riggans (19 July 1935 – 2 December 2013) was a Scottish actress. She was best known for playing the role of Suzie Sweet in the BAFTA-winning children's show Balamory and Effie Macinnes in Take the High Road. She began her acting career in 1946, when she did a voiceover at the age of 11, and went on to star in television, radio and theatre productions.

== Acting ==
Riggans was best known for her role as Effie Macinnes on the Scottish television soap opera, Take the High Road from the early 1980s until the last episode in 2003. She appeared as Suzie Sweet in Balamory, a children's television programme (2002–05), and as Sadie in Still Game (2002–07). She appeared in the pilot episode of Taggart, "Killer".

Riggans once famously cleared glasses from tables at chucking out time during her run at the King's Theatre.

== Theatre ==
Year	Title	Role	Company	Director	Notes
1990	The Ship	Peggy	The Ship's Company, Govan	Bill Bryden	play by Bill Bryden

== Television credits ==
- Mrs. McKinley - Maggie (1981–1982)
- Mrs. Ramsay – Taggart (Pilot episode "Killer" 1983)
- Effie McInnes – Take the High Road (1983–2003)
- Spider – I, Lovett (1989)
- Prim Lady – Taggart (1990)
- Prim Lady - Rab C Nesbitt (1990)
- Sadie – Still Game (2002–2007)
- Suzie Sweet – Balamory (2002–2005)
- Nell – Dear Frankie (2004)

== Death ==
Riggans died in her sleep at her Edinburgh home on 2 December 2013, a year after suffering a stroke. She had suffered from a stroke in April 2012 ,which restricted her speech and physical movement. Her daughter, Samantha, was with her when she died.

BBC Scotland executive Yvonne Jennings, who worked as a producer on Balamory, paid tribute to the actress; "As Suzie Sweet in Balamory, Mary was well respected by those who worked with her and much loved by the CBeebies audience. Like Suzie, Mary was a kind and giving woman who took on the role of nurturing young talent."

Julie Wilson Nimmo, who played Miss Hoolie in the children's show, added: "Shocked and saddened to hear about Mary's passing. We worked together for years, she was a brilliant actress and will be remembered fondly by the Balamory family."
