= Rodd Christensen =

American actor

- Born: Rodney Boyd Christensen; 6 July 1957 (age 69); Las Vegas, Nevada, U.S.
- Occupation: Actor
- Known for: Playing Spencer the Painter in Balamory

Rodd Boyd Christensen (born 6 July 1957) is an American bus driver and former actor who portrayed Spencer the painter on the BBC children's television programme Balamory (2002-05). He was the show's only non-British lead actor. He is also known for presenting shows for BBC Two.

Christensen was born in Las Vegas, Nevada and trained as an actor. A devout Christian, in 1991 he moved to Scotland, and spent eleven years doing youth work with charity Scripture Union in Fife. Between 2002 and 2005, he appeared in Balamory in the role of Spencer, a painter and musician.

As part of his ministry he was one half of the duo Rodd and Marco, who performed faith-based sketches and music for churches and other faith groups in the UK.

Rodd presented a children's educational programme called Talkie Time for BBC Two, with episodes airing in 2010 and 2011.

In 2012, Rodd starred as a presenter for BBC Two for a programme called Counting with Rodd, an educational programme teaching children all about maths and numbers.

He became a Stagecoach bus driver after acting work dried up, before moving back to the U.S..
