= Kasia Haddad =

British actress

- Born: 1976 or 1977 (age 48–49); London, England
- Occupation: Actress
- Known for: Balamory, Doctors

Kasia Haddad (born 1976 or 1977) is a retired British actress. She portrayed the role of Josie Jump for series 3 and 4 in the children's television programme Balamory (replacing Buki Akib) and Wendy Parnell in an episode of Doctors.

Haddad also starred in the Balamory DVD special Seeking Santa.
