= Juliet Cadzow =

Scottish actress (born 1948)

- Born: Scotland
- Occupation: Actress
- Years active: 1972–present
- Known for: Balamory, River City

Juliet Cadzow is a Scottish actress. She played Edie McCredie in the children's television series Balamory, Suzie Fraser in BBC series River City, Mrs Anderson in Molly and Mack and various roles in BBC series Still Game.

== Career ==
Cadzow started her career with Billy Connolly in "The Great Northern Welly Boot Show". She then went on to have seasons at the Dundee Repertory Theatre, The Traverse, The Lyceum Theatre, Salisbury, Watford, Wildcat, 7.84, Borderline Theatre, The Young Vic, and Citizens Theatre.

In the television comedy series Still Game, she played the roles of Winston's fantasy woman and the conductress, whom her character became when he was awakened. She was nominated for "Best Actress" at the 1997 BAFTA Scotland Awards for her role in the 1992 film Upstate.

In 2011, Cadzow played Gabriella Catalano in Fast Romance.

In 2012, Cadzow provided the voice of the resurrected Ice Governess in the Doctor Who Christmas special of 2012 The Snowmen.

In 2018 and 2022, she appeared in two episodes of Molly and Mack as Mrs Anderson.

In 2018, she appeared in Clique as Glyn Michaels.

In 2022, Cadzow celebrated twenty years of Balamory, with television appearances on BBC The Nine and radio stations such as BBC Radio Scotland and BBC Radio WM.

Between 2016 and 2024, Cadzow played the role of Susie Fraser in River City.

Cadzow has played in various pantomimes in the UK over the years and has also appeared in the television series Casualty and Coronation Street.

In 2023, Cadzow appeared as a guest on a documentary about 100 years of BBC Scotland alongside Balamory co-star Julie Wilson Nimmo and River City cast members, it aired on BBC Radio Scotland and the BBC Scotland channel. In May 2023, it was announced that Cadzow would be starring in the theatre tour of The Stamping Ground across Scotland.

In November 2025, Cadzow made a return to A Play, A Pie And A Pint in Strangers In The night, 10 years since her last performance at Oran Mor.

In 2026, Cadzow reprised her role of Edie McCredie in the reboot of the children's television series Balamory for CBeebies and BBC iPlayer. In May 2026, Cadzow starred as Norma Desmond in Sunset Boulevard at Perth Theatre in Perth, Scotland. In June, Cadzow played the same role at Oran Mor, Glasgow.

== Awards and recognition ==
She was nominated for "Best Actress" at the 1997 BAFTA Scotland Awards for her role in the 1992 film Upstate.

In 2017, Cadzow received the Lord Provost of Glasgow Award for Performing Arts and for her work at Glasgow Caledonian University, where she is a Cultural Fellow.

== Theatre ==
Year	Title	Role	Company	Director |	Notes
1982	Ane Satyre of the Thrie Estaites	Prioress	Scottish Theatre Company	Tom Fleming	play by Sir David Lyndsay, adapted by Robert Kemp
1990	Border Warfare	Pictish Queen, Isabel of Fife, Jenny Geddes etc.	Wildcat Stage Productions	John McGrath	play by John McGrath
1994	The Big Picnic	Bunty	Promenade Productions	Bill Bryden	play by Bill Bryden
2014	The Emperor's New Clothes	Emperor	Òran Mór	Dave Anderson	pantomime
2015–2016	Snow White	Queen Morgiana	King's Theatre, Glasgow	Eric Potts	pantomime
2016–2017	Peter Pan	Mrs Darling	Pavilion Theatre, Rhyl	Anthony Williams	pantomime
2017–2018	Sleeping Beauty	Carabosse	Kings Theatre, Glasgow	Nick Winston	pantomime
2018–2019	Snow White	Wicked Queen	His Majesty's Theatre, Aberdeen	Tony Cownie	pantomime
2023	The Stamping Ground	Maggie	Raw Material Arts	Luke Kernaghan	Musical, Scottish tour
2025	Strangers In The Night	May	A Play, A Pie and A Pint	Cora Bissett	Stage play
2026	Sunset Boulevard	Norma Desmond	Perth Concert Hall and Theatre and Oran Mor, Glasgow	Morag Fullarton	Musical, Scottish tour

== Filmography ==
=== Film ===
Year	Film	Role	Director	Notes
1972	The Duna Bull	Helen	Laurence Henson	short
1973	The Wicker Man	villager on Summer Isle	Robin Hardy	(as Juliette Cadzow)
1982	Scotch Myths	Malvina Farquharson-Smith / Miss Moffat / Bonnie Jean	Murray Grigor	film funded by Channel 4
1986	Heavenly Pursuits	woman teacher	Charles Gormley	
1989	Venus Peter	Queen Paloma	Ian Sellar	based on a novel by Christopher Rush
1990	The Big Man	Margaret Mason	David Leland	based on the novel by William McIlvanney
1997	Upstate	unknown	Steven O'Connor	film
2000	Beautiful Creatures	mother on beach	Bill Eagles	written and produced by Simon Donald
2008	Stone of Destiny	Ian's mother	Charles Martin Smith	
2011	Fast Romance	Gabriella Catalano	Carter Ferguson	written by Debbie May and James McCreadie
2021	Falling for Figaro		Ben Lewin	
2024	A Scottish Love Scheme	Mairi Campbell	Heather Hawthorn Doyle	written by Gina Azzi

=== Television ===
Year	Film	Role	Notes
1973	The View From Daniel Pike	Jackie	TV series (Episode 'Pig in the Middle')
1979	The Camerons	Beth	TV series (Episode 1.3)
1980	Scotch and Wry	Various	TV series (Episode dated 31 December 1980)
1980	Lady Killers	Christina Haggart Mackenzie	TV series (Episode 'Miss Madeleine Smith')
1980	Doom Castle	Kate Petullo	TV series (5 episodes 1.2 ~ 1.6)
1980	Airport Chaplain	Susan	TV series (Episode 'The Eye of Faith')
1980	High Road	Sarah Lindsey	TV series
1982	Juliet Bravo	Jo Fairbrother	TV series (Episode 3.8 'You Can Go Home Again')
1986, 1992, 2000, 2003	Taggart	Marie Burns, Maureen MacDonald, Alice Dillon, Moira Randall	TV series (Four episodes: 'Death Call', 'Nest of Vipers', 'Ghost Rider', 'Penthouse and Pavement')
1987	The Houseman's Tale	Margaret Birss	TV mini-series (Episodes 1.1, 1.2)
1987	Double Scotch & Wry	Various	Video
1988	Playing for Real	Teresa Kelly	TV mini-series
1990	The Campbells	Annabel	TV series (Episode 'Old Ways and New')
1990	Border Warfare	Elizabeth I/ Isobel	TV movie
1990	Triple Scotch & Wry	Various	Video
1990, 1999	Rab C. Nesbitt	Gift Shop Assistant/ Phoebe	TV series (Episodes 1.2 'Rat', 8.6 'Trips')
1993	Crime Stories	Barbara Stonehouse	TV series (Episode 'The Stonehouse Affair')
1993	I, Lovett	1st Attractive Woman	TV series (Episode 1.5 'Romance')
1994	Doctor Finlay	Esme	TV series (Episode 2.12 'In Arcadia')
1994	Roughnecks	Morag	TV series (Episodes 1.1, 1.2, 1.3)
1995	Jolly: A Life	Joan	TV movie
1996	Casualty	Madeleine	TV series (Episode 11.4 'Thicker than Water')
1996	Hamish Macbeth	Bethsheba McBean	TV series
1996	Nightlife	Local Resident	TV movie
1998	Looking After Jo Jo	Lorraine's mother	TV series
1999	Life Support	Sister Hilda Steel	TV series (Episode "Soul and Conscience")
2001	The Bill	Cllr Angela Morris	TV series (Episodes 17.22 'Tolerance: Part One' and 17.23 'Tolerance: Part Two')
2002–2005, 2026–	Balamory	Edie McCredie	Children's TV series – Recurring lead (original), minor recurring (revival)
2006	Still Game	Conductress/Gorgeous woman	TV series (Episode #5.5 'All the Best')
2007	Wedding Belles	Kelly's Ma	TV movie
2009	New Town	Mrs Showalter	TV movie
2012	Doctor Who	The Ice Governess (voice)	TV series (Episode 7.6 The Snowmen)
2012	Skins	Receptionist	TV series (Episode 6.8)
2016–2024	River City	Suzie Fraser	Series Regular
2018	Clique	Glyn Michaels	TV series (Episode 2.3)
2021	Molly and Mack	Mrs. Anderson	Recurring character (Episodes 1.3, The Fairy Godmother; 4.13, The Mystery Muncher; 5.16, The Hairy Donkey)
2022	My Old School	Brandon's Gran	One-off appearance (BBC Scotland')
2023	Big Birthday Bash	Herself	Guest appearance (BBC Scotland')

=== Radio ===
Date	Title	Role	Director	Station
12 January 2010	My Romantic History	Mum/Receptionist	Kirsty Williams	BBC Radio 4 Afternoon Play
28 September 2014 – 5 October 2014	Set in Darkness	Lorna	Bruce Young	BBC Radio 4 Classic Serial
