= Kim Tserkezie =

British actress

- Born: 30 July 1973 (age 53); Newcastle upon Tyne, England
- Occupations: Actress, presenter, director, producer
- Years active: 2000–present
- Known for: Penny Pocket in Balamory
- Spouse: Daniel Tunnicliffe (m. 2008)
- Children: 2
- Website: kimtserkezie.com

Kim Tserkezie (born 30 July 1973) is an English actress, director, producer, and television presenter from Newcastle upon Tyne. She is best known for portraying the role of Penny Pocket in the children's series Balamory and as a presenter for BBC's Disability Today and BBC Two's From the Edge.

== Early life and career ==
Born in Newcastle upon Tyne, Tserkezie began her television career as a presenter for BBC's Disability Today programme and BBC2's From The Edge programme. She is best known for playing the character of Penny Pocket in the BAFTA award-winning children's television series Balamory (which ran from 2002 to 2005 and aired on BBC One, BBC Two, and CBeebies). She also runs her own broadcasting production company called Scattered Pictures.

In 2015, Tserkezie wrote and published her first ever children's book, titled The Wheelie Wonderful Life of Millie Monroe in a planned series called Toys for Tomorrow. She won a John Brabourne Award in 2016 and was a board member of the Royal Television Society North East and the Borders 2017–21.

In 2020, she won two Royal Television Society Awards, Best Drama Performance for her role as Jasmine, the lead character in the short film, Obsession. She also won a Drama Short Form award with the rest of the team, as she also directed the film. In 2021, Tserkezie was nominated for the Entrepreneur of Excellence Award for her broadcasting work at the National Diversity Awards.

She has starred in multiple radio documentaries for the BBC World Service.

In 2022, she presented and produced radio documentary series Hidden Sport for the BBC World Service. It was also aired on BBC Sounds. In 2023, Tserkezie continued to work on films, including starring in two as a lead and working alongside Netflix.

Tserkezie has been a full BAFTA member since 2014 and is Deputy Chair of BFI's Disability Screen Advisory Group. She has chaired industry events for RTS, BFI (including at London Film Festival) and for Netflix. She is a trustee of the North's leading development agency for writing and reading, New Writing North.

In April 2023, Tserkezie and her production company Scattered Pictures were chosen as part of the Netflix film-makers project Breakout in partner ship with Creative UK. The project, a film titled My Thoughts Exactly, was awarded funding, with Tserkezie as lead actor and co-writer. Details regarding its release are yet to be revealed.

In July 2023, Tserkezie was featured as a BroadcastNow Hot Shot 2023 for her services to writing and pushing for opportunities to portray disabled characters where their disability isn’t the central narrative.

Tserkezie returned to her role on Balamory in 2026, but now she was no longer wearing blue, she now wears red to honor Mary Riggans' memory.

== Personal life ==
Tserkezie was diagnosed with a progressive neuromuscular disorder spinal muscular atrophy as a child and has used a wheelchair for most of her life. Her website was voted "best representation of a person in a wheelchair" by children's organisation Whizz Kidz in 2005. In 2020, she was named as one of the UK's 100 most influential disabled people.

Tserkezie's father and maternal grandmother are Greek.

She married schoolteacher Daniel Tunnicliffe in 2008 and they have two children together.
