= Andrew Agnew (actor) =

Scottish actor and director (born 1976)

- Born: Andrew William Agnew; 28 September 1976 (age 50); Scotland
- Occupations: Actor, singer, director
- Known for: Balamory, Scot Squad, Woolly and Tig

Andrew William Agnew (born 28 September 1976) is a Scottish actor, singer and director. He is best known for playing the role of PC Plum in the BAFTA award-winning CBeebies programme Balamory, Tam in CBeebies Woolly & Tig and Walter in Scots Squad.

== Career ==
Agnew began his television career with the BBC2 drama Fran's People written by Simon Carlysle where he played Colin the Chef.

Agnew then got his big break, cast as the police officer, PC Plum in CBeebies' Balamory.

Along with his acting career, Agnew has Directed for theatre and television, a Children's programme called Me Too!. before directing some of the new CBeebies and Tattie Moon hit series Woolly and Tig, series 1 & 2 and the special episode "Hola" filmed in Spain. He also appeared in the episodes "The Haircut", "Hogmanay" and "The Play" as Tam. He also directed series 1 of My Pet and Me for CBeebies and series 2 of Olga Da Polga on CBeebies for MARAMEDIA.

Agnew returned to the role of PC Plum in special CBeebies versions of the seasonal nature programmes Springwatch and the BAFTA award-winning Autumnwatch. The character also appeared in continuity announcements during the series' run.

Returning to the stage, Agnew has appeared in many Pantomimes including Peter Pan in Tunbridge Wells he played Smee opposite James Gaddas as Captain Hook. In 2008 Andrew fronted his own CBeebies Theatre Show for nine months touring the UK; CBeebies at the Theatre – Let's Play.

Agnew has appeared in 2 Balamory Live Arena shows – "Strike up the Band" and "What's the story?" – and has also completed another 2 Arena tour in CBeebies Live – "Fantasy Circus", in which he played the Ringmaster. CBeebies Live – Reach to the Stars saw Agnew back in the Police uniform at Wembley Arena in 2012.

Agnew appeared alongside Su Pollard in Snow White at the Malvern Theatre over 2007 Christmas panto season. and as Mother Goose Christmas 2008 at the Kilmarnock Palace Theatre with Liam Dolan.

Agnew played Joseph in "A Child Made of Love" a play he appeared in at the Tron Theatre, Glasgow in October 2009 by Matthew McVarish. He worked with him again in the 2023 spring season of A Play, A Pie and A Pint's Quietus in which he played Donald. Autumn season of 2025's PPP saw him play Peter in Matt Anderson's Death of an Influencer.

Agnew has also written and Performed in his one-man revusical entitled "Dually Andrews". He appeared as Peter in Gone but not Forgotten with Michelle McManus and Liam Dolan in 2017 & 2018 tours.

Agnew appeared in the Christmas Pantomime Sleeping Beauty at Swansea's Grand Theatre between December 2009 and January 2010 starring alongside Malandra Burrows and Helen Fraser. before reprise the role in Basingstoke with Wendy Craig and Abi Titmuss. He has also appeared twice in New Brighton in Aladdin with Dean Sullivan & Kelsey-Beth Crossley and reprised the role of Wishee alongside Bill Ward in 2018/19 season, this time also as Director.

Agnew played Edna Turnblad in the hit musical Hairspray in Aberystwyth Arts Centre in 2012.

Agnew played Smee in Peter Pan alongside Jennifer Ellison, Ace Bhatti and Gemma Hunt... He returned to the Churchill Theatre, Bromley the following Christmas to play Buttons in Cinderella with Matt Lapinskas, Anna Williamson and Jessica Martin.

Agnew's voice appears on a few tracks recorded for the Woolly and Tig CD -Songs for Wobbly moments. His songs include the lullaby "Counting Kisses" and The Elves and the Shoemaker as well as the new radio series on CBeebies radio.

Agnew was one of the directors on series 1 of the 2015 CBeebies programme for BBC Scotland called My Pet and Me. He appeared on Pointless Celebrities on Kids TV Special and got to the "head to head" alongside Balamory favourite Julie Wilson Nimmo.

Agnew went on to star alongside Su Pollard and Matt Lapinskas as Muddles in Snow White at the Sunderland Empire. The 2015/16 Pantomime season saw Agnew starring as Smee in Peter Pan at the Malvern Theatres with Mark Moraghan and Hannah Jane Fox and again in Basingstoke with Gary Turner in 2017.

In 2016 and 2017, Agnew directed and starred in Sleeping Beauty at the Sunderland Empire playing Silly Billy. Faye Tozer from Steps, Vicky Entwistle, Amy-Leigh Hickman and Bobby Crush Co-starred.

Agnew's 2019 panto season saw him perform as Muddles and Director at the Pavilion Theatre, Rhyl in Snow White and the Seven Dwarfs with Sue Holderness and Charles Burden. For Imagine Theatre he has appeared as Nurse Bella Moray in Snow White in Palace Theatre, Kilmarnock as well as Dame Trott in Jack and the Beanstalk and Dame Dolly Dundonald in Goldilocks and the Three Bears in a Big Top Circus tent, Kilmarnock.

Agnew directed and appeared as Chris in John Godber's 'On the Piste' at The Brockley Jack Studio, London. As Dave in a tour of Love Me Tinder by Catriona Harvey and directed the 2018 Scottish tour of "51 Shades of Maggie" starring Leah MacRae and the 2020 tour of One Singer One Song by Cat Harvey with Tom Urie & Ed Reid.

Agnew's production of The Francie & Josie Sketchbook toured theatres early 2020/22, starring Johnny Mac and Liam Dolan and most recently directed The Dolls' the Rerr Terr Variety Show, starring Louise McCarthy and Gayle Telfer Stevens.

For 2021 panto season Agnew directed and Starred as Buttons in Cinderella in Pavilion Theatre, Rhyl in 2021 with Hayley Tamaddon.

Agnew appeared in Series 7 & 8 of Scot Squad as Walter for BBC, still available on BBC Iplayer.

He appeared in the Pavilion Theatre, Glasgow as Dougal "Donald" Morrison in the hit comedy Rally Roon the Rangers by Ned Sollid. as The Ranger's Spokesperson in The Journey Back written by Stuart Hay playing the Clyde Auditorium, OVO Hydro and UK Tour in which he also Directed.

In 2022, Agnew celebrated Balamory's 20th anniversary and return to BBC iPlayer with television and radio appearances, including This Morning with Julie Wilson Nimmo who played Miss Hoolie in the show.

As a Compere he has presented for PRIDE Glasgow, The Euros at Glasgow Green and The UCI Cycling World Championships in Glasgow.

Andrew was also seen, as be part of the cast, in a new musical Glasgow Kiss in the Pavilion Theatre, Glasgow, which has been announced as returning next year.

From 2026, Agnew once again plays the role of PC Plum in Balamory. A clip of him filming a new song in the series was leaked on Instagram.

== Personal life ==
Agnew resides in Glasgow, Scotland. He is gay.

In 2004, Agnew and his then gay partner were attacked with a snooker cue, when they got into an altercation with their neighbour. The neighbour's brother, John Watson, was tried at Glasgow Sheriff Court and found guilty of breach of the peace and assault. Sheriff James Penman told the attacker at Glasgow Sheriff Court that Watson's behaviour had been "deplorable". However, Watson avoided jail time.
