= Julie Wilson Nimmo =

Scottish actress

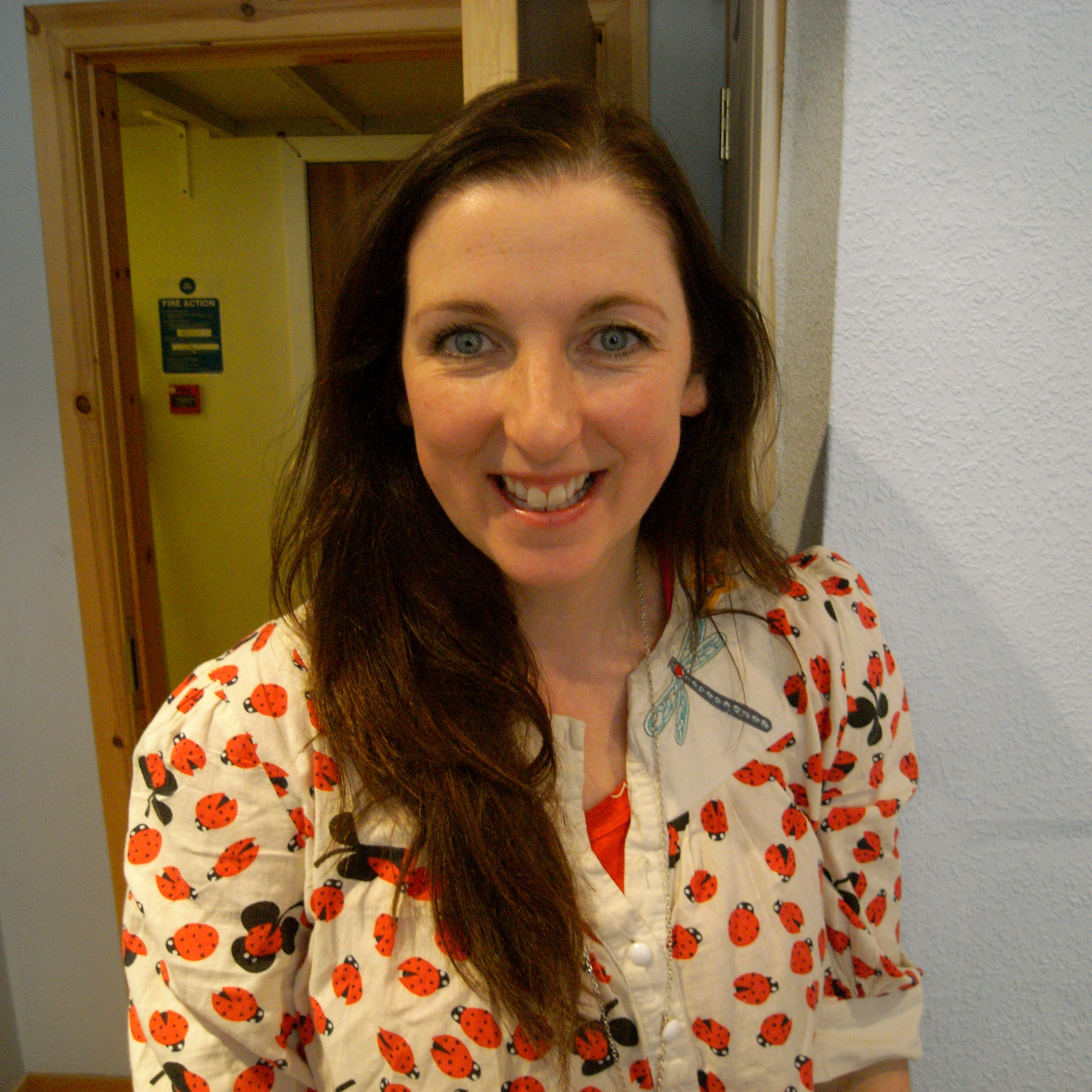
- Wilson Nimmo in 2011
- Born: 26 May 1972 (age 54); East Kilbride, Lanarkshire, Scotland
- Education: Royal Conservatoire of Scotland
- Occupation: Actress
- Years active: 1991–present
- Known for: Balamory; Scot Squad; Olga Da Polga
- Spouse: Greg Hemphill (m. 1999)
- Children: 2
- Website: instagram.com/namaste_nimmo

Julie Wilson Nimmo (born 26 May 1972) is a Scottish actress. She is best known for playing the roles of Miss Hoolie in the BBC Children's series Balamory, Mrs Sawdust in CBeebies show Olga Da Polga and DC Megan Squire in the BBC Scottish comedy series Scot Squad.

== Career ==
Nimmo started her career along with a lot of other Scottish actors and comedians in the 1995 sketch show Pulp Video which was partly written by her husband Greg Hemphill and his co-writer Ford Kiernan. Between 1999 and 2002, Nimmo was a regular star in the sketch show Chewin' the Fat by the same writers. She starred in all four series and the New Year specials.

After taking a break from acting, Nimmo returned to the stage in Glasgow as So-Shy in a production of Sandy Wilson's pantomime musical Aladdin. She briefly appeared in the Scottish comedy television series Rab C. Nesbitt, and played Elizabeth Macquarie in the docudrama The Father of Australia.

From 2002 to 2005, Nimmo starred in the CBeebies children's show Balamory as Miss Hoolie.

She played Lovely Sue in the Radio 4 comedy series Fags, Mags and Bags. She played Katrine Trolle and other witnesses in a radio dramatisation of the court case HM Advocate v Sheridan and Sheridan.

In 2014, she appeared as a guest in a children's special of Pointless Celebrities alongside fellow Balamory star Andrew Agnew but lost in the head-to-head round.

In 2016, she starred with John Michie and Lorraine McIntosh in the BBC One Scotland horror comedy West Skerra Light, which was written and directed by her husband Greg Hemphill. She subsequently reunited with Michie and McIntosh for Hemphill's 2018 horror comedy Long Night at Blackstone.

In 2017, she played DC Megan Squire in the BBC Scotland comedy show Scot Squad. In 2018, she appeared in an episode of Still Game, alongside her husband.

In 2020, she took part in the Scenes For Survival project, a response to the closure of live theatre since the beginning of the coronavirus pandemic, written and directed by her husband for National Theatre Of Scotland.

In 2021, she starred as Olive the Reindeer at the Tron Theatre.

In 2022, she celebrated Balamory's 20th anniversary and return to BBC iPlayer with television and radio appearances, including This Morning with Andrew Agnew.

In October 2022, Nimmo co-hosted the breakfast show with Ewan Cameron, which went out across the Scottish Bauer Network.

From December 2022 to January 2023, Nimmo appeared in The Wonderful Wizard of Oz at the Tron Theatre.

In November 2022, Nimmo starred as Mrs Sawdust, alongside husband Hemphill as Mr Sawdust, in new CBeebies television series Olga da Polga.

On New Year's Day 2023, Nimmo starred in a television programme called Jules' and Greg's Wild Swim about wild swimming with actor-husband Hemphill. It aired on BBC Scotland Channel and BBC iPlayer. The full series was recorded in the summer of 2023.

In January 2023, Nimmo returned as DC Megan Squire in BBC Scotland comedy series Scot Squad.

In February 2023, Nimmo returned to co-host Ewen and Cat at Breakfast standing in for Cat alongside Ewen Cameron which aired across the Scottish Bauer Network.

In March 2023, Nimmo featured in an BBC Scotland documentary as part of the broadcaster celebrating 100 years of broadcasting. She was joined by husband Hemphill and Balamory co-star Juliet Cadzow. In August 2023, Nimmo and Hemphill completed filming the series version of Jules and Greg's Wild Swim which aired in January 2024 on BBC Scotland. In the final episode, Nimmo returned to Tobermory, where Balamory was filmed.

In January 2025, Nimmo and her husband Greg Hemphill presented Jules and Greg's New Year for BBC Radio Scotland, sharing stories and picking their favourite music. In October 2025, Nimmo and her husband released a book titled Jules and Greg's Wild Swim, based on their BBC wild swimming television programme. The couple went on a book tour around Scotland and appeared on STV News to promote the book. They also appeared at Wigtown Book Festival.

Nimmo returned as Miss Hoolie in a new series of Balamory in 2026, with the first episode airing on 20 April on CBeebies and BBC iPlayer. Nimmo added that she 'never expected' to return to the show.

In April 2026, Nimmo was a guest reader on the children's television series CBeebies Bedtime Story.

== Personal life ==
Nimmo is married to actor Greg Hemphill, and they have two sons, Ben and Chevvy. They met and appeared together in the television comedies Pulp Video (1995–1996, her first major television credit), and Chewin' the Fat (1999–2002).
