= List of Still Game characters =

Still Game is a Scottish sitcom series, following the lives of a group of pensioners who live in Craiglang, a fictional area of Glasgow. The show was created by and stars Ford Kiernan and Greg Hemphill, and first aired on BBC One Scotland on 6 September 2002.

The main characters are Jack Jarvis and Victor McDade, two lifelong friends who are neighbours in Osprey Heights, a tower block. They like to visit their local pub together where their friends Winston Ingram, Tam Mullen and Eric spend most of their time. Other main characters include: Boabby the barman, Navid Harrid, owner of the local corner shop, and Jack and Victor's nosy neighbour Isa Drennan.

Many of the main characters' relatives make recurring appearances in the show such as Navid's wife Meena (whose voice is heard but whose face is never seen until the final episode), Tam's wife Frances and Isa's ex-husband Harry. Jack's daughter, Fiona and Victor's son, John make few appearances in the show, but have major plot roles in the few episodes they do appear. Other recurring characters include Shug, Chris the Postie, Stevie the Bookie, Pete the Jakey, Joe Douglass and several other Craiglang residents.

== Main characters ==
=== Jack Jarvis ===
Appears in all 62 episodes from "Flittin'" to "Over the Hill"

Jack Jarvis, Esq. is played by Ford Kiernan. He is a stout, squat man with white hair and a moustache; and is frequently seen wearing a bunnet and smoking a pipe when outdoors. In his youth, he worked in his father's grocery shop and was an amateur boxer. He has been best friends with his neighbour Victor for over sixty years, both living on the same floor of Osprey Heights, a tower block in Craiglang; the two first met when a young boy named Frank McCallum was knocked down by a tram. Jack occasionally struggles with loneliness as his wife, Jean, died in 1991, and their daughter Fiona has emigrated to Canada. Nevertheless, Jack spends almost all of his time with Victor, most frequently at their local pub, the Clansman. In contrast to Victor, Jack demonstrates slightly lower intelligence, a higher chance of being swayed by peer pressure from others, and less of a way with words; often trying to be witty but instead only producing a banal remark, and using malapropisms (such as saying "discretion" instead of "desecration"). Additionally, he seems more easily offended and quick to anger than Victor. However, Jack has shown himself to be more observant than Victor on several occasions; notably, in the episode "Wummin", he notices that Bert Findlay's strange behaviour shows signs of an impending suicide, although this is ultimately not the case.

In the first episode, "Flittin'," Jack is said to be 74 years old (the same age as Victor); confusingly, in all other episodes his age is stated as 72. In a sketch on the sister programme Chewin' the Fat, his surname was given as McAlpine.

=== Victor McDade ===
Appears in all 62 episodes from "Flittin'" to "Over the Hill"

Victor McDade is played by Greg Hemphill. He is a tall man with grey hair and a moustache. Initially, Victor wore a bunnet like Jack but this was changed after the first episode to a trilby hat to add visual distinction between the two characters. In his youth, Victor worked with Babcock & Wilcox (possibly as an engineer) and he has been best friends with Jack for sixty years, with whom he lives on the same floor at Osprey Heights. Victor has lived in Osprey Heights since 1975, with Jack moving into a deceased neighbour's flat in "Flittin'". Victor is, like Jack, a widower; his wife Elizabeth (Betty) died in 1993. His son, John, lives in Johannesburg with his family; Victor often laments how little he sees of him due to the distance and John's busy schedule. Victor demonstrates slightly higher intelligent than Jack, sometimes correcting him or cutting him off when he begins to ramble by stating "that's plenty, Jack." Of the many pensioners in Craiglang, Victor is shown to be the most honest; for example, in "Cauld" Victor is last to succumb to the pensioners' scheme of stealing electricity (he condemns those who participate in the scheme as thieves) and expresses disapproval at Winston's decision to fake a "bad leg" in order to acquire a home help in "Wummin'". Victor is 74 at the beginning of the series and celebrates his 75th birthday in "Smoke on the Water".

=== Winston Ingram ===
Appears in all 62 episodes from "Flittin'" to "Over the Hill"

A good friend of Jack and Victor's, Winston Ingram is played by Paul Riley. He wears glasses, a bunnet similar to Jack, and often sports a burgundy jacket and joggers. He used to work in the Clyde shipyards, at Yarrows. More so than the other pensioners, Winston is quick to anger, passive-aggressive and foul-mouthed. He is known for his scheming and attempts to cheat the system, often in search of extra money; examples include committing benefit fraud and bypassing his electricity meter to survive the winter. In the episodes "Dug" and "Holiday", he pretends to have a relationship with Isa (despite finding her annoying) to fend off the attempts of her ex-husband, Harry, to get back with her; although he often takes advantage of Isa's kindness and soft spot towards him, receiving free food from her in the process. However, he seems to have some sense of morality, often reprimanding Tam for his stinginess. He has several enemies, including Stevie the Bookie, with whom he has a long-running feud, the latter fleeing from Craiglang after he is unable to pay Winston £32,500 after an accumulator win. Winston has his lower leg amputated at the end of the third series after his eighty-a-day cigarette habit catches up with him; this is replaced by a feminine prosthetic leg with painted nails, much to the amusement of the other pensioners. He has a daughter named Margaret, a son named Brian, and two grandsons, Joe and Thomas. In the ninth series, he meets Winnie, a wheelchair-using woman that he first meets on Tinder. The two marry in the episode "Hitched".

In the earlier stage play, he mentions a brother named George living in Nevada and a son who died in a car accident in 1967, but it is unknown if this is consistent with the television series. In the TV canon, he does have a brother named Walter.

=== Boabby ===
Appears in 61 episodes from "Flittin'" to "Over the Hill" (excluding "The Party")

Robert "Boabby" Taylor (Note: West of Scotland version of "Bobby".) is played by Gavin Mitchell. Boabby is the landlord of the Clansman, the local pub. He is often the butt of jokes from the regulars, (Note: Some jokes come from the double entendre that "boaby" is also the Scots word for the penis.) and usually has a double act-related nickname for Jack and Victor when they arrive at the Clansman, but the duo always have a wittier comeback to put him in his place; often with the retort "two pints, prick!". He does not believe in the phrase "the customer is always right" and prefers to hand out snide comments with his pints, though the locals are not the type of people to take them lying down. It has been revealed that he had a brief career as an amateur porn star, where he went by the name of "Troy the Gardener". In the episode "Who's the Daddy?" Boabby reveals he has been working behind the bar of the Clansman since he was eighteen, though he also claims to have previously worked as a bouncer at the Queen Margaret Union. He usually has grievances with either Winston; often barring him for various antics; or Tam, who almost never pays for his own drinks. Although Boabby is sarcastic and mouthy by nature, he occasionally displays a charitable and honourable side, especially toward Isa whom he often trusts to run the bar while he cannot.

In the episode "The Fall Guy", Boabby is revealed to be fifty years old. In the last scene of the final episode, "Over the Hill", Boabby is seen some years later as a substantially older man still working in the Clansman, where he welcomes the viewers to the pub.

=== Isa Drennan ===
Appears in 60 episodes from "Flittin'" to "Over the Hill" (excluding "Drama" and "Saucy")

Isa Drennan is played by Jane McCarry. She is the third resident of Jack and Victor's landing in Osprey Heights, and is Craiglang's local gossiper. She is aware of her reputation, confessing in "Gairden" that she is a "nosy bastard" and will stop at nothing in her quest to find out the latest news. Isa works as a cleaner in Navid's shop and is shown to be a practising Roman Catholic. She has an estranged husband named Harry, who frequently had affairs with other women and robbed money from her during their relationship. Also in the episode "Gairden," she mentions that she has a son named Colin. In "Dug" and "Hoaliday", she has a pretend relationship with Winston; although unrequited, Isa has a secret fancy for Winston but her obsession with gossip and tendency to be nosy often sabotages her chances with him, as he finds these qualities highly irritating. Isa is heavily involved with community projects and charities, attends dance classes and enjoys helping others. Winston maintains this is her way of keeping in touch with people to "keep on tap (top) of everyone's business". Despite many people outwardly professing to be annoyed by Isa, she is still regarded as a vital member of the community, with the other pensioners immediately leaping to defend her if they feel she is being treated unjustly.

=== Tam Mullen ===
Appears in 61 episodes from "Flittin'" to "Over the Hill" (excluding "Shooglies")

Thomas "Tam" Mullen is portrayed by Mark Cox. A self-confessed "miserable bastard", (Note: Miserable" in Scottish English means "miserly", "thrifty", or "stingy"; as opposed to "sad" or "mean") he frequently tricking people into giving him free belongings or buying him a drink, and is infamous for his unapologetic greed. In some episodes, he is shown to be delirious at the thought of getting freebies. Methods of Tam's to attain these include frequently entering competitions (much to the other's annoyance, he always wins) and conning the ill (sometimes even the terminally ill) out of their valuable possessions while working as a DJ at the Western General Hospital, to the dismay of his friends.

He marries the local librarian, Frances Kirkwood, in the episode "Ring". His materialistic attitude often causes a rift between himself and his wife, but, at 70, Tam becomes father to Tam Jr. and Frances becomes Britain's oldest mum. Their son is retconned for the series's return in 2016, with the couple celebrating only their second wedding anniversary in that year's episode "The Undrinkables". A good friend of Winston, Tam tends to be his 'double act' partner - Winston serves as best man at Tam and Frances's wedding. Despite his nature, Tam occasionally demonstrates a more generous side, sometimes paying if the situation absolutely requires it. For example, in "One In, One Out", he uncharacteristically offers to buy his friends a round of drinks as they await news of Jack's potentially life-threatening heart operation.

=== Navid Harrid ===
Appears in 57 episodes from "Flittin'" to "Over the Hill"

Navid Harrid is played by Sanjeev Kohli. Navid runs the local shop with his soap opera-loving wife, Meena. Navid and Meena came to Craiglang in 1975 after having secretly eloped from India, as Meena was due to be wed in an arranged marriage. Navid has many witty one-liners, but has to tolerate Meena's frequent nagging and insults. Although he and Meena spend most of their time verbally sparring, he does still express love for her and grows paranoid when she goes to India to visit her sister, Navid instead assuming she is visiting an old flame. They have a daughter, who gets married in the first series. Navid is a Muslim who laments the fact that his religion forbids both gambling and the consumption of alcohol – although in the episode "The Undrinkables" it is revealed that he and Meena are distilling potentially dangerous moonshine and secretly distributing it around the estate. Ford Kiernan has stated the name of Navid's shop 'Harrid's' is a play on the famous department store, Harrods.

=== Eric Jones ===
Appears in 56 episodes from "Flittin'" to "Grim Up North"

Eric Jones is played by James Martin. He sees himself as "a young man trapped in an old man's body." He is seen most often with Tam and Winston, with whom he seems to spend almost all his time in The Clansman or in the bookies. In "Hot Seat", it is revealed that he served in the fire service and the Navy. When Boabby is away from the pub for any reason, Eric is often chosen to cover for him, much to the joy of the regulars, presenting them an opportunity to get free drinks. Eric dies in the series 8 episode "Grim Up North" due to a heart attack (yet people were convinced that it was from "the touch of Satan" by new funeral director Mr Sheathing). Along with Shug, he is one of the few characters who is played by an actor who is actually of pensionable age.

== Recurring characters ==
=== Meena Harrid ===
Appears in 27 episodes from "Flittin'" to Over The Hill

Meena Harrid, portrayed by Shamshad Akhtar, is Navid's wife. As a running gag, her face is never seen (bar a brief glimpse in the final episode), and she almost always appears in the room near the counter. Although she seems to understand English, she mostly speaks in Hindi and Punjabi, frequently insulting the other characters without their knowledge. She also frequently shouts expletives at Navid who is the only person who can understand her. Navid in turn frequently fires insults at Meena in English in front of the customers.

Although she is played by Shamshad Akhtar in every series, she is played by a different, unknown actor for the 2014 live show at the SSE Hydro.

=== Peggy McAlpine ===
Appears in 15 episodes from "Flittin'" to "Over The Hill"

Peggy McAlpine is Jack's obese ex-neighbour. She is very obnoxious and occasionally violent, often manhandling her husband, Charlie, from the first episode. Despite her aggressive nature, she seems to be friendly with many locals, although she often becomes embroiled in the occasional feud with Isa – such as the local baking competition. She also seems to enjoy irritating Winston, especially when it comes to buying the last gigot chops at the butchers. She is known to have an 18-year-old son, Simon, who was charged with drink driving at the age of 12.

=== Pete the Jakey ===
Appears in 13 episodes from "Cauld" to "Plum Number"

Peter McCormack, better known as "Pete the Jakey", (Note: "Jakey" is a Scots slang term for a homeless alcoholic.) is a familiar sight to residents of Craiglang. The archetypal tramp, he is said by Tam to have lost his family, dog and house due to his alcoholism. Pete also has a very active imagination; for instance, he is credited for inventing the popular 'beefy bake' sold in a Craiglang bakery, and lies about working for the government in an effort to be noticed. Ignored by many, he is often seen sleeping outside Navid's or under a bridge. A man of many secrets, it is revealed that he was the father of the property developer who wanted to demolish the Clansman. As actor Jake D'Arcy died shortly before the writing of the seventh series, Pete's funeral takes place during that series' second episode. In Pete's will, it is revealed that Boabby gave him fry-ups free-of-charge for his breakfast and, as a gesture of goodwill, had nominated Boabby for a Glasgow Good Citizen Award.

=== Shug ===
Appears in 11 episodes from "Faimly" to "Over The Hill"

Hugh "Shug" McLaughlin (Note: Shug" being a Scots nickname for people named Hugh.) (played by Paul Young), who has extremely large ears (earning him the nickname "Shug the Lug", lug being the Scots word for ear), is a self-proclaimed expert in radios and sound waves. He was a communications officer during the Second World War and he often tells long, rambling stories about it, much to Victor's and Jack's annoyance. Despite this, due to his technological knowledge, Jack and Victor often rely on Shug for help. Shug can apparently hear through walls and across streets, such are the size of his ears. He has a part-time job as an overnight security guard in Delany's department store. In "Cat's Whiskers", Shug and Edith become the cover stars of Twilight Monthly magazine. In the final episode, it is revealed that Shug and Edith are now in a relationship.

=== Methadone Mick ===
Appears in 10 episodes from "The Undrinkables" to "Over the Hill"

Methadone Mick (portrayed by Scott Reid), is a young recovering drug addict who lives under a bridge and was a friend of Pete the Jakey. In "Job", Jack and Victor give him a clean-up for a job interview, which he gets at Glasgow City Chambers. However, in the following episode "Small Change", he is once again jobless. He was once seen with rotting teeth but in "Job", he acquired a set of false teeth that he unknowingly claimed from a home dentist and since then, is now always seen with them. He also briefly took on the job of being a football mascot and a lifeguard.

At the end of the final episode, he is shown to have cleaned up his act and is working at the Craiglang library, and still has his false teeth.

=== Chris the Postie ===
Appears in 10 episodes from "Waddin'" to "Gadgets"

Played by Sandy Nelson, Chris Armstrong is Craiglang's local postman; thus is more commonly known as Chris the Postie. Not exactly the brightest young lad, it often falls to one of the older gentlemen to explain a seemingly easily understandable situation to him. Chris appears to be a very lazy postman, and often leaves "Sorry You Were Out" cards deliberately when he can't be bothered delivering people's parcels. Despite these shortcomings, Chris is revealed to be a talented painter and decorator, managing to satisfactorily redecorate Isa's flat after Jack and Victor spectacularly botch the job.

=== Frances Mullen ===
Appears in 10 episodes from "Doacters" to "Over the Hill"

Played by Kate Donnelly, Frances Mullen (née Kirkwood) (Note: While at Tam and Frances's wedding in "Ring" her maiden surname is given as Kirkwood, her sister's surname is given as Drummond in "Saucy", a later episode.) is passionate about literature and works at the library in Craiglang. In series 2 Winston and Tam both battle for her affections; Tam is eventually victorious, in part due to his own well-read nature. The couple marry in the episode "Ring" in series 4, although in later episodes their marriage becomes turbulent due to Tam's stinginess. In "One In, One Out" Frances gives birth at the age of 64, making her the oldest mother in Britain, with Tam aged 70. Frances also has a sister, Molly, played by Dorothy Paul.

=== Stevie Reid ===
Appears in 8 episodes from "Cauld" to "Hitched"

Stevie Reid (better known as "Stevie the Bookie") is Craiglang's local bookmaker. He is arrogant, disliked by many people in Craiglang, and is considered by Winston to be "the worst bookie in Britain". He is a nemesis of Winston, Stevie often taunting the former over his betting choices. In "Cairds" he is bankrupted by Winston winning a £32,500 accumulator. After stealing Winston's winnings and fleeing, he returns in "Drama" posing as his fictional older brother "Frankie". While everyone else in Craiglang falls for this act, Winston immediately sees through it and confronts him, ultimately forcing Stevie to give him his earnings - although Winston ends up gambling it all away again in Stevie's shop; before winning back even more and then losing it in a comical manner. In "Seconds Out", Stevie and Boabby fight each other for a woman named Stacey who works in the new pizza restaurant. Neither is successful, as Stacey's father is the boxer Jim Watt, who knocks both men out. In early episodes, his name was listed on his shop as Stevie Barret.

=== Joe Douglass ===
Appears in 4 episodes from "Cairds" to "Dead Leg - Part Two"

A footballer in his youth, Joe Douglass was once quick on his feet, but in his old age, he is confined to a mobility scooter. In "Lights Out" he moves into the flat below Winston since it is lower down and allows Winston to offer him assistance.

=== Edith ===
Appears in 7 episodes from "Courtin'" to "Over The Hill"

Edith, played by Maureen Carr, is the sister of the charity shop worker Barbara. She has a hunchback, numerous moles, and misshapen teeth. She first appears as Victor's "date" in the episode "Courtin'" and is also featured in the episode "Swottin'", where she has the role of quizmaster during Bobby's quiz night. She enjoys a pint of Guinness. Despite her unflattering appearance, she seems to have no problems getting men in bed, once waking up in bed with Winston, and once more with Boabby. In "Hot Seat", she strikes up a conversation with a man as ugly as she is and they discuss past sexual encounters. In "Cat's Whiskers", Edith gets a makeover (e.g. having her moles removed and having fluid drained from her, which was the reason for her hunchback) and becomes a cover star of Twilight Monthly magazine along with Shug, with whom she starts a relationship.

== Guest stars ==
As a character

- Martin Compston appears as an electronics seller in "Local Hero" who sells two pay-as-you-go phones to Jack and Victor. He insults them, asking a colleague for any two phones, as they are "two daft old bastards".
- Craig Ferguson appears as retired Hollywood stuntman, Callum Coburn in "The Fall Guy", who in his youth emigrated from Scotland to California (partly mirroring Ferguson's real life) but is visiting Craiglang to catch up with old friends, and attempts to rekindle his teenage romance with Isa.
- Robbie Coltrane appears as Davie, a bus driver who drives the local Dial-A-Bus for pensioners in the episode of the same name. While generally kind and helpful, Davie (due to being reminded of his mother's illness) suffers a mental breakdown causing him to drive erratically and at high speeds, terrifying the passengers, including Jack, Victor and Isa. He stops when he nearly runs over Boabby, who was cycling around Loch Lomond at the time. The passengers attempt to shut him out the bus, but let him in when he promises to take them to a pub. He explains his story and Jack, Victor, Isa and Boabby forgive him.

As themselves

- John McCririck appears on Winston's television screen, breaking the fourth wall to giving him tips on which horse to back at the bookmakers in "Drama".
- Jim Watt appears in "Seconds Out" as the celebrity guest for a charity bottle smash at the local pub, The Clansman. He hands out passes for his gym in Shawbank.
- Michelle McManus also appears in "Seconds Out". She turns up to The Clansman as the celebrity guest but is told by Bobby that he had got Jim Watt instead. In the closing scene, Winston delivers five pizzas to Michelle's house and she explains the reason is that she has just split up with her boyfriend.
- Lorraine Kelly appears in "One in One Out" on her own breakfast television show and interviews Frances and Tam after Frances became the oldest mother in Britain at 64 years old.
- Midge Ure
- Clare Grogan
- Amy Macdonald appears in "Hitched", as somebody that Boabby knew from his days at QM. Unfortunately, when he asks her to perform at Winston and Winnie's wedding, she refuses and beats him up.
- The Bluebells appear when they are hired by Boabby to perform at Winston and Winnie's wedding in "Hitched", with a rendition of their song "Young at Heart".

== Other characters ==
=== Fiona ===
Fiona is the daughter of Jack and Jean Jarvis and appears in three episodes: "Dug", "Hoaliday" and "One In, One Out". She was born and raised in Craiglang, but now lives in Ontario, Canada with her husband Tony and two sons, Jack Jr. and Stephen. She is close to her father, regularly phoning him and often sending family videotapes to Glasgow; in stark contrast to Victor's son, John. Jack and Victor travel to Canada to visit them in "Hoaliday", where Jack gives Fiona the wedding ring that belonged to her mother. Fiona flies to visit Jack in hospital after he has a heart attack in "One in One Out". In the 2014 live show, it is revealed that Fiona was once in a relationship with Boabby. She is played by Marj Hogarth.

=== Harry Drennan ===
Harry Drennan is Isa's estranged ex-husband who has a history of adultery and stealing money from her. When he returns six years later in "Scones", she lets him back into her life, only for him to steal her purse and flee. For his past and present mistreatment of Isa, Harry is effectively an outcast within the entire Craiglang community, who often leap to her defense. He returns for a second time in "Dug" but Isa rejects him; pretending to be in a relationship with Winston to put Harry off. Finally getting the message, Harry leaves Craiglang for good afterwards. In "Hot Seat" Isa finds out that he has died, but feels no sadness. Harry is played by Ronnie Letham and appears in "Scones", "Dug" and the 2006 Hogmanay Special, "The Party".

=== "Manky Frankie" ===
Frank Riley, or Manky Frankie as he is known to the locals, lives in Osprey Heights. His flat is festooned with various items that would be regarded as junk by anyone else, including fish and chips wrappers and a kiddie ride. He has a penchant for dismantling cars and leaving the parts lying about, especially in the communal landing. He is played by Stevie Allen and appears in the episodes "Cauld" and "Brief".

=== Charlie McAlpine ===
Peggy's long-suffering husband, often on the receiving end of his wife's short temper. She often suspects that he is cheating on her, referring to him as a "whore-meister". Charlie is portrayed by William Cassidy.

=== Jackie ===
Jackie is the housing officer in two episodes, "Flittin'" and "All the Best". Jack and Victor visit him in the former episode; getting him to pull some strings so that Jack can move in to the newly vacant flat next door to Victor. He also has a hand in Winston moving to Finport in "All the Best"; realising that Winston is on invalidity benefits, he suggests a new housing initiative in Finport which turns out to be sheltered housing. He is played by Alex Robertson.

=== Wullie MacIntosh ===
William MacIntosh is a pensioner with a reputation for borrowing (tappin') things from the Craiglang residents, but never returning them. In episode "Waddin", he is wrongly thought to have died in hospital (it was a younger man with the same name), allowing Jack, Victor, Tam and Winston to ransack his house and return everything he had borrowed to their rightful owners. In the episode "Swottin'", he auditioned for the role of quizmaster, but is nervous in front of a microphone and not chosen. Johnny Irving portrays him in both episodes.

=== Fergie ===
Derek "Fergie" Ferguson is a young ned who appears to be in his late-teens. Like many of the neds, he partakes in questionable activities, in his case, he sprays graffiti and tries to cheat Craiglang pensioners out of their money by raising funds for the non-existent Craiglang Football Club. He is engaged to Sinead from the cafe, but, on his stag night, Jack and Victor tie him to a fence naked and he misses his own wedding. In the episode "Cauld," his first name is revealed to be Derek, and it's suggested John Boyle is his grandfather on his mother's side. It's later revealed that he did marry Sinead in the end, as in "Small Change" they celebrate their one-year wedding anniversary. Fergie is played by Jamie Quinn.

=== Sinead ===
The waitress at the local cafe, Sinead doesn't put much enthusiasm into her job. She is stood up by Fergie on their wedding day (albeit unintentionally on his part) but are married off-screen. She makes a brief reappearance in "Small Change" and in "Dead Leg: Part Two".

=== Margo ===
Margo is an attractive quizmaster whom Bobby takes a liking to. He asks her out on a date, but ends up beaten up by her for playfully slapping her on the buttocks, which Winston teases him about afterwards.

=== Big Arthur ===
Another Clansman regular, often seen in the background of the pub. He has, according to Jack, "plenty of padding" and doesn't seem to know the rules of Blackjack.

=== Mick ===
Mick appears to be a tough bloke from the rough yet clean Eagle Heights flats and is a friend of Tam. He is first seen during "Hatch" where Jack and Victor were rumoured to be gay, and later made an appearance as one of the cast for Blightly's Hardest Boozers.

=== Neddy Mum ===
The bane of Navid, she is a single mother who repeatedly comes in to complain of the state of his confectionery, asking for refunds for such items as "Hot Mini Eggs" and chocolate that gave "[her] wee Justin" diarrhoea. Navid in return refuses to do so and insults her and her son, and makes numerous insulting assumptions about her being a drug addict, primarily with the phrase "Git oot, you junkie bastard!". The character was portrayed by Nicole Toal and then Cheryl McCall.

=== Charlie ===
Charlie is a very tall and obese man, to the extent he can even make the Osprey Heights lift break. He is seen again in "Hot Seat" when he sits between Jack and Victor on a park bench.

=== Joe ===
Joe is Winston's teenage grandson. Winston trains him for a boxing match and wants the Craiglang community to offer Joe as much support as possible. Everyone in Craiglang believes that Joe has no chance, much to Winston's annoyance; although they are proven right when Joe is knocked out by a ned in one round. He is played by Gordon McCorkell, and appears in the episode "Flittin'".

=== Father Graham ===
The local Catholic Parish Priest of Craiglang who appears in 2 episodes; "Flittin" and "Cauld". He is played by Finlay McLean.

=== Father Doonan ===
Mentioned to be the Parish Priest of Craiglang, and presumably Father Graham's successor. Winston Ingram hides in a confession box and impersonates Doonan while Isa Drennan sits on the other side, thinking she is speaking to him. He does this to convince Isa to be intimate with Callum Coburn. From Winston's impersonation, we can tell that Father Doonan is an Irish Catholic Priest, likely young, and is well-regarded and trusted in Craiglang's community. Winston's impersonation also implies Doonan is from Dublin due to his accent.

=== Wullie Napier ===
William Napier is a resident of Osprey Heights and old friend of Jack, Victor and Pete the Jakey who dies as a result of the cold weather in episode "Cauld". He is found frozen on his sofa by Jack and Victor when they visit his flat.

=== Barbara ===
Barbara volunteers in the local charity shop and is Edith's sister. She is attractive and has big breasts; Winston resultantly nicknames her "Boobara". Jack fancies her but is reluctant to ask her out, fearing it would betray the memory of his late wife Jean. Victor encourages him by saying that Jean would want Jack to be happy. Jack and Barbara start a platonic relationship, during which Victor is left on his own. Eventually Isa tells Victor that Barbara was married; he then confronts her, telling her that she should not lead Jack on. This brings their relationship to an end and Jack and Victor reconcile. Barbara is played by Eileen McCallum.

=== Ronnie Wilson ===
Ronald Wilson is a pensioner who takes a "goofy turn" in George Square after being a contestant on Mastermind; losing by one point because he passed on a question relating to Bismarck. He strips down to his underpants and begins shouting and laughing randomly, and is subsequently arrested and admitted to a sanatorium by his absentee son, Norman. Jack and Victor visit him at the institution and he appears fine to them. Ronnie explained that he had a dream that he was ten years old and that he was on a beach. Jack and Victor believe this to be reasonable and sign their friend out of the sanatorium, by pretending to be his brothers; though he soon repeats his "goofy turn" at the tower block's rooftop park.

=== Mrs Begg ===
Mrs Begg is a home help assistant. She is attractive and helps out pensioners in the Craiglang area who have mobility issues. In particular, Mrs Begg was Winston's home help; however, she was highly suspicious of Winston's "sore leg". After finding out about his deception, she bans him from using her services. However, she is forced to resume being Winston's home help after he, Jack and Victor discovered that she was having an affair with reclusive widow Bert Findlay. Celia Imrie plays Mrs Begg.

=== Bert Findlay ===
Albert "Bert" Findlay is friend of Jack and Victor's. He has depression because his wife, Annie, has recently died. Jack and Victor, being widows themselves, try to help their friend and help him out of his slump, as they spot several possible signs in his pattern of behaviour of an impending suicide. He ends up having an affair with Mrs Begg. He is played by Brian Pettifer.

=== Stewart Anderson ===
Stewart Anderson is a Craiglang resident who is said by Jack and Victor to have been severely depressed. He then begins taking an American drug to treat depression; now, he has the energy of a teenager and is the complete opposite of his former self. He recommends the drugs to Jack and Victor, who exhibit the same energy but unfortunately suffer a prominent side-effect. Alec Heggie plays Stewart.

=== Martin ===
Martin is a Craiglang resident seen in the episode "Brief". While waiting for a bus, he argues with his mother as she never bought any snowballs for him, yelling "Ya stupid, old, cow!" at her, which results in a frustrated Jack and Victor mocking him. Tom Urie plays Martin.

=== Vince Gallagher ===
The local mobile snack bar owner, Vince Gallagher used to run the canteen at Yarrows where Winston once worked, but he was very unhygienic. Sometime during the Falklands War, he made a stew which caused Winston and hundreds of other men to have food poisoning and delayed a boat going to join the war. Vince was sacked but, years later, Winston confronts him at his mobile snack bar. Vince claims that he had changed his ways but Winston does not trust him; Vince then proves that he is immaculate and the builders are satisfied with his food. At the same time, Navid is away in India for his brother's funeral and Jack and Victor are running the shop in his absence. Winston takes advantage of this and, along with Jack and Victor, turns Navid's shop into a snack bar; taking the custom away from Vince. Vince takes his revenge by sabotaging the soup, causing the customers of Navid's shop and the builders to have diarrhoea. Winston then plants cockroaches inside Vince's van, making Vince's food appear contaminated. With his business and his reputation shattered, Vince broke down and drove his van through Navid's shop when the latter returned from India; before feeling from the van. David Hayman plays Vince.

=== Billy Ferguson ===
Although he is never actually seen, Billy is mentioned more than once. It's said that Billy suffered a massive heart attack in his house and lay dead for several days, until he is eaten by his dog, "balls first". Supposedly there was "nothing left of Billy when they found him." He is mentioned again in "Heavy Petting".

=== Big Innes ===
"Big" Innes is a large and imposing man who is friendly with the Craiglang locals. A tall and robust man, he is of such stature that he drinks four pints at a time and eats cornflakes from a soup pot. When he lived in Craiglang, he stood for no nonsense from neds and would regularly "sort them out". However, at some point he moved north to Elgin, Moray. In "Big Yin" (the only episode in which Innes appears) the Craiglang neds have become worse than ever; Jack resultantly decides to phone Innes and asks him to come down to help. Innes's wife agrees to let him go down, on the condition that he is not to be given Midori; which he enjoys but is not allowed for unknown reasons. After two days of Innes's arrival, Craiglang seems all but free of the troublemaking neds. Unfortunately, Isa unwittingly gives Innes a bottle of Midori; Innes rapidly drinks the whole bottle before causing havoc in the Clansman. He is portrayed by Clive Russell.

=== Kevin ===
Kevin is young worker at FoodFare who antagonises Winston. He is 24 and is very ageist, cocky, and a bully at heart; hassling Winston from their first meeting. One night, he accidentally switched off a fridge, ruining a pile of dairy products. Kevin feared he'd be sacked but Andy, another elderly worker, felt sorry for Kevin and took the blame for him; Kevin has left Andy alone ever since. Andy offers Winston advice on how to beat Kevin, but Winston ignores him. Eventually, Jack and Victor visit FoodFare in an emergency attempt to remove all the bottles of Midori before Big Innes comes. They succeed, but Kevin, seeing the three old men, insults Winston. By this time, Winston has had enough. He punches Kevin and quits his job. Andy witnesses this and is glad that Winston gives Kevin his comeuppance.

=== Archie Taylor ===
Archie is a reclusive man, known as Craiglang's local hermit. Despite being a friend of Jack and Victor, he hasn't set foot outside his house since the mid-1960s. His reason for this is that he was evacuated during World War II to a farm in Stirlingshire, and was comfortable with a peaceful life; when he returned to Craiglang, it was "like coming to New York" for him. In 1966, he put his boot through his TV after England's victory over West Germany in the FIFA World Cup. Because of his reclusive lifestyle, social services would visit him, making sure he had sufficient food, clothes and money. In 2004, his house was to be demolished, so he left his home for the first time in decades. Jack, Victor and the Craiglang locals welcome him out and encourage him not to shut himself away again, ultimately without success as his new flat is robbed. It turns out he had hoarded 40 years' worth of social money under his sofa, and refurbishes his flat with the money. Archie then returns to a hermit lifestyle. He is played by Sylvester McCoy in "Oot".

=== John McDade ===
John McDade (Note: Named Jamie in the series premiere "Flittin") is Victor and Betty's son. John only appears once in the series in the episode "Aff", though is regularly referred to. He lives in Johannesburg, South Africa with his family; often failing to keep in contact with his father. This upsets Victor as he misses his son deeply. Victor is sometimes so annoyed with John that he refers to him as an "uncaring bastard". To try to get more attention from his son, Victor pretends to be seriously ill; this revelation worries John so much that he travels to Glasgow from South Africa to Craiglang to be at his father's side. John later discovers that Victor was only pretending to be ill, leaving him furious. Victor apologised, but pointed out to John that it was due to his lack of contact. John understood he was also at fault, and they reconcile.

=== Rena ===
Rena works in the cafe. She is a widow and is in a relationship with Wullie Reid, a man almost twice her age; Wullie being a friend of Jack and Victor's. They believe it's good for Wullie that he's found love, but Isa believes that Rena is trying to kill Wullie in order to inherit his house; largely because Rena has Wullie overworking for her, Isa believing Wullie will die as a result. Nobody believes her until Rena goes to Navid's and buys a bottle of white spirits, a box of matches and a packet of Jammie Dodgers. Even Navid believes that Rena is setting a trap for Wullie. During a storm, Wullie is on the roof of his house fixing the TV aerial, when he suddenly slips and crashes through the greenhouse. Isa looks out her window and sees the police and an ambulance outside his house. She knocks on Jack and Victor's doors and asks them to come with her. However, it is revealed that Wullie has survived the fall, but Rena has died. Rena had heard the noise and came running down the stairs, but tripped and broke her neck.

=== Wullie Reid ===
William Reid is a Craiglang pensioner and is friendly with Jack and Victor. He is in a relationship with Rena, a woman half his age. He believes he is really in love, but Isa suspects that Rena means to kill Wullie; while Jack and Victor think it's both impressive and funny that Wullie is "shagging" Rena. One stormy night, Wullie is on the room fixing the TV aerial for Rena when he slips and falls off the roof, crashing through the greenhouse. Miraculously he survives, but Rena hears the noise and falls down the stairs, breaking her neck. Wullie is devastated at her death, but takes a fancy to a female paramedic called to the scene.

=== Thomas ===
Thomas is Winston's younger grandson. He is a troublemaker, who causes grief for his parents. His mother, Margaret, warned him that if he didn't behave, he wouldn't be coming on holiday with them. This ended up being the case, and Thomas had to stay with Winston while his parents went to Blackpool without him. Winston, furious, is determined to straighten out Thomas. However, Thomas smuggles in a girl, a cannabis plant that Winston thought was a tomato plant, and invites his friends along. His friends make cookies containing cannabis, making Winston believe they killed his "tomato" plant. They even eat Winston's pies that were meant to be for his dinner. Winston is very annoyed and considered grassing on Thomas until he eats a cannabis-laced cookie; Winston then becomes stoned and Thomas is let off the hook.

=== Chris Howden ===
Chris Howden is a property developer. He plans to demolish the Clansman; this news upsets Boabby and the regulars. Even Navid was concerned because, if the only pub in town was to close, his shop would be next. Chris offers to buy the locals a drink, which they accept; Chris then explains that he wanted to demolish the Clansman in order to recreate the houses that used to stand there in memory of his late mother, Jenny Turnbull, who grew up in one of those houses. Jenny turns out to be a woman whom Jack, Victor and Winston all had sexual relationships with in the past; one of them could plausibly be Chris's father. They are worried that their families would be disgusted, but Boabby believes that no one would demolish their father's favourite pub, hoping the news will save it. None of the men are successful in finding out who the father is, but Isa discovers who it is when she sees an old photo of Winston's that she took; working out that Pete the Jakey was missing from the photo and he must have had sex with Jenny. Furthermore, Pete has a letter from Jenny proving he is the biological father of Chris. Chris decides to keep the pub, but renames it "Jenny's" in honour of his mother.

=== Molly Drummond ===
Molly Drummond is Frances's sister and Tam's sister-in-law. She lives in Finport on the east coast of Scotland, and visits Craiglang to see her sister in "Saucy". For unknown reasons, Molly did not't attend Tam and Frances's wedding. In the past, she was a famous singer and is recognised by Jack. Tam claims that Frank Sinatra bought her a drink when she performed in New York; although this is likely a lie in order to get a free round from Boabby; he succumbs to it nonetheless. Tam develops romantic attraction to Molly upon discovering that she is just as tight-fisted as him. Because Frances is busy at the library, Tam is left to show Molly around Craiglang. Eventually, Tam decides to lay his feeling for Molly to rest since he is already married and rejects her. Molly, upset, grabs Tam's testicles. Dorothy Paul portrays Molly.

=== Cammy Hastie ===
A home dentist who is a friend of Jack and Victor. He used to be a professional dentist before he got struck off for removing four teeth from a woman who, unbeknownst to Cammy, appeared in toothpaste adverts. When preparing Methadone Mick for a job interview, Jack and Victor notice that his teeth are rotten and take him to Cammy to tend to them. Cammy gives Mick a pair of white false teeth to replace the rotten ones. Cammy is played by Kevin Whately in the episode "Job".

=== Walter Ingram ===
Winston's brother, Walter Ingram is basically a funnier, friendlier, and overall better version of Winston, to the charm of the Craiglang locals. Walter lost an arm like Winston lost his leg, making the brothers polar opposites. Walter eventually revealed that he only came to Craiglang to receive the money his Aunt Lily left for Winston.

=== Mrs Fletcher ===
The owner of a residential care home that Jack, Victor and Isa temporary stay at whilst waiting for new homes, as Osprey Heights is set to be demolished. She starts off as friendly, but reveals her true nature as being stern and controlling when she confiscates the home's remote control from Jack and Victor after they "forced" the other residents to watch a pole dancing programme. She also places a 9pm curfew on the residents, due to them escaping after Jack and Victor left the doors open to go to the Clansman. She is played by Ronni Ancona.

=== Iain Duncan "I.D." Sheathing ===
The new undertaker in Craiglang after the previous one, Mr McLeary, died. Isa starts telling stories that Sheathing is the Grim Reaper and that anyone he touches dies within a week. This is re-enforced by his ominous appearance: he is a tall, gaunt man who always wears a full-length black leather coat and fedora. At first, people dismiss the stories as nonsense, but suspicion grows when Eric drops dead shortly after Sheathing pats him on the arm. He follows Isa home and talks to her, Jack and Victor. He explains that Eric was 85 and had a heart condition, and goes on to explain that the only reason he was following them was so he could learn more about Eric's life in order to deliver a fitting eulogy at his funeral. The name I.D. Sheathing is an anagram of "Death is Nigh". Sheathing is played by Bruce Morton.

=== Callum Coburn ===
An old friend of Isa who left Craiglang to become a stuntman in Hollywood. Callum returns to Craiglang 49 years later and hopes to reconnect with Isa and his old life after deciding to retire from his job. During filming for an adaptation of Lassie, he had his penis bitten off by a dog. He appeared to be a handsome man with short hair and white teeth, but when Isa agrees to start a relationship with him, she is shocked to see that he is actually overweight and toothless, with long balding hair. Upset about Isa not loving his true self, Callum (whilst giving Boabby a driving lesson) attempts to commit suicide by driving the car into a canal. Jack and Victor attempt to save them, but get into trouble. Fortunately Methadone Mick is able to save the four men by throwing them life buoys. Afterwards, Callum leaves Craiglang, but not before apologising to Isa for not being what he seemed and promises to keep in touch. He appears in "The Fall Guy" and is played by Craig Ferguson.

== See also ==
- List of Still Game episodes
