= List of Still Game episodes =

The following is an episode list for Still Game. The first series began on 6 September 2002 and its ninth and final series aired on 28 March 2019.

In the first three series the episode titles were all Scots words that were related to the episode. This was changed to standard English titles for Series 4, so that the rest of UK audience could understand the titles.

== Series overview ==
Series	Episodes	Originally released		
Series	Episodes	First released	Last released	Network
1	6	6 September 2002	11 October 2002	BBC One Scotland
2	6	28 March 2003	23 May 2003	BBC One Scotland
3	6	7 May 2004	11 June 2004	BBC One Scotland
4	6	22 July 2005	26 August 2005	BBC Two
Christmas Special		28 December 2005		BBC One
5	6	19 June 2006	24 July 2006	BBC Two
Hogmanay Special		31 December 2006		BBC One Scotland
6	6	12 July 2007	23 August 2007	BBC Two
Christmas Special		23 December 2007		BBC One Scotland
Hogmanay Special		31 December 2007		BBC One Scotland
7	6	7 October 2016	11 November 2016	BBC One
8	6	8 March 2018	12 April 2018	BBC One
9	9	24 February 2019	2 August 2019	BBC Scotland/BBC One

== Episode list ==
=== Series 1 (2002) ===
No. overall	No. in series	Title	Directed by	Written by	Original release date	Viewers (millions)
1	1	"Flittin'"	Michael Hines	Ford Kiernan and Greg Hemphill	6 September 2002	3.18
Jack's life is increasingly miserable due to anti-social neighbours. He is keen to move but cannot find a house, until the man across the landing from his best friend Victor dies. Meanwhile, Jack and Victor's friend Winston is training his grandson for an upcoming boxing match against a troublemaking ned. Guest Starring: Gordon McCorkell, Finlay McLean, Alex Robertson and Richard Mark
2	2	"Faimly"	Michael Hines	Ford Kiernan and Greg Hemphill	27 September 2002	3.16
Victor awaits a visit from his son John, who lives in Johannesburg. When John leaves a message on Victor's answering machine, a crucial part of the message is inaudible due to background noise. Jack and Victor set out to discover what it says with help from their friend Shug, who has an extremely acute sense of hearing. Meanwhile, Winston is injured in a fight with Peggy McAlpine at the butchers over who gets the gigot chops, ending up in hospital. This episode originally ran fourth. Guest Starring: Billy Boyd, Jackie Farrell, Carolyn Conrad and Billy Riddoch
3	3	"Cauld"	Michael Hines	Ford Kiernan and Greg Hemphill	13 September 2002	3.72
The residents of Craiglang are experiencing one of the coldest winters in decades, when Winston offers a solution: free electricity via tampering with the meter. Gradually, a number of locals accept Winston's help but Victor takes the moral high ground and refuses to participate in the illicit scheme. In the original, incorrect BBC broadcast, this episode ran second. Guest Starring: Stevie Allen, Finlay McLean and James O'Hara
4	4	"Courtin'"	Michael Hines	Ford Kiernan and Greg Hemphill	20 September 2002	N/A
Jack asks Barbara, the woman from the charity shop, to go out with him; leaving Victor feeling lonely and resentful of his friend's new companionship. Meanwhile, Winston is barred from the Clansman and must find other ways to spend his leisure time. This episode was broadcast third in the original run of the show. Guest Starring: Eileen McCallum, Maureen Carr and Noddy Davidson
5	5	"Waddin'"	Michael Hines	Ford Kiernan and Greg Hemphill	11 October 2002	3.44
Navid's daughter is getting married in a wedding for which invites are coveted around Craiglang. Jack and Victor decide to do something about it. Meanwhile, it is thought that local pensioner Wullie MacIntosh has died; Winston plans to rummage through his house (full of unreturned borrowed items) to find something that will assure him an invitation. This episode ran last in the original broadcast. Guest Starring: Johnny Irvine and Donald Cameron
6	6	"Scones"	Michael Hines	Ford Kiernan and Greg Hemphill	4 October 2002	3.81
Jack and Victor are irritated by Tam's effortless success in entering and winning competitions and embark on a futile attempt of their own, involving composing a slogan for a scone advert. Meanwhile, Winston is having financial problems after his benefits are stopped. Isa's estranged husband, Harry, also returns after a six-year absence. Notes: This episode ran fifth in the original broadcast. Guest Starring: Bill Murdoch, James Weir, and Ronnie Letham

Note: Early series of the show featured short sound clips whenever an exterior shot of Osprey Heights (the building Jack, Victor, and Isa live in) occurred. These included Jack and Victor sighing contentedly and one of the two saying "Is that you?" with the other replying "Oh, aye, that's me." The most common clip featured Jack and Victor humming the song "Hurdy gurdy gurdy, in the windae boxes". These decreased in frequency after the first couple of series, and were discontinued altogether by the fourth series.

=== Series 2 (2003) ===
No. overall	No. in series	Title	Directed by	Written by	Original release date	Viewers (millions)
7	1	"Gairden"	Michael Hines	Ford Kiernan and Greg Hemphill	28 March 2003	2.88
The residents of Craiglang are being terrorised by the local neds and their dog at a local park; the pensioners, frustrated, decide to create their own park they can escape to. Meanwhile, Jack and Victor check on Ronnie, who has been recently admitted to a sanatorium after being found dancing in his underwear in George Square. Guest Starring: John Shedden, Gary Sweeney, and James Young
8	2	"Wummin"	Michael Hines	Ford Kiernan and Greg Hemphill	4 April 2003	4.11
Jack and Victor are concerned for their old friend Bert Findlay, who has been deeply depressed and grown unkempt ever since the death of his wife, Annie. Winston has his own "troubles" with a less than sympathetic home help assistant, Mrs Begg. Guest Starring: Brian Pettifer and Celia Imrie
9	3	"Doacters"	Michael Hines	Ford Kiernan and Greg Hemphill	11 April 2003	3.90
Jack and Victor are amazed at the vitality of their friend Stuart, who has a newfound zest for life after being prescribed a new "yankee wonder drug" to cure depression. They conspire to obtain a supply for themselves, despite not needing the medicine. Meanwhile, both Tam and Winston have the hots for the local librarian, Frances. Notes: This episode establishes that Tam has a seven-year-old grandson, named Ryan, but is unmarried. In "Ring", it is stated that Tam had a wife who left him because he cheated on her. Guest Starring: Alec Heggie
10	4	"Brief"	Michael Hines	Ford Kiernan and Greg Hemphill	18 April 2003	3.76
Victor buys a second-hand car hoping it will give him the freedom he's always wanted, but it ends up in him being taken for a ride. Meanwhile, Winston tries his hardest to discourage Tam's tight-fistedness. Note: This episode implies that for unknown reasons, Jack is unable to drive. In all scenes, Victor is shown driving, and in fact Victor is the only one of the two who has any interest in the car. Jack does, however, drive in "All the Best," from the fifth series of the show. Jack is also seen driving in some sketches in Chewin' the Fat. Guest Starring: Stevie Allen, Tom Urie and Richard Wallis
11	5	"Tappin'"	Michael Hines	Ford Kiernan and Greg Hemphill	25 April 2003	4.06
A money lender appears in Craiglang and soon finds customers. Isa assumes Jack and Victor have borrowed money when she notices they have more than usual, when in fact they are merely spending some extra money they had saved up. Meanwhile, Tam and Winston are enjoying a round of golf at their local course until they are interrupted by the neds; their attempts to resolve the situation only end in disaster. Guest Starring: James Young and Jim Murray
12	6	"Scran"	Michael Hines	Ford Kiernan and Greg Hemphill	2 May 2003	3.94
Jack and Victor are left in charge of Navid's shop as Navid has to return to India to attend his brother's funeral. Winston sees an opportunity to make some extra cash and decides to set up a side business of takeaway food run from the back of the shop; simultaneously getting on the wrong side of Vince Gallagher, a snack van vendor with whom Winston has history. Guest Starring: David Hayman
13	7	"Shooglies"	Michael Hines	Ford Kiernan and Greg Hemphill	9 May 2003	3.18
Jack buys Victor an engraved tankard to celebrate their momentous sixtieth anniversary as best friends, however, Victor has forgotten the occasion. To make it up to Jack, they decide to have a day out in Glasgow, where they encounter a face from the past. Guest Starring: Finlay Welsh
14	8	"Buntin'"	Michael Hines	Ford Kiernan and Greg Hemphill	16 May 2003	3.41
The Clansman regulars are suspicious when Pete, the local alcoholic tramp, tells everyone he has secured a very important job at the council's new "facility", Jack and Victor decide to follow him to find the truth of the rumours. Meanwhile Navid, Winston and Shug are on the hunt for a bin-raiding fox. Guest Starring: Donald Cameron and Nik Weir
15	9	"Dug"	Michael Hines	Ford Kiernan and Greg Hemphill	23 May 2003	4.14
Jack is invited to visit his daughter, Fiona, who lives in Canada. Asked to come along, Victor initially refuses, but in the end accompanies Jack on the holiday. Meanwhile, Winston ends up having to pretend to be Isa's "pumpkin" to see off her estranged husband Harry. Guest Starring: Ronnie Letham and Dan Ratushny

=== Series 3 (2004) ===
No. overall	No. in series	Title	Directed by	Written by	Original release date	Viewers (millions)
16	1	"Hoaliday"	Michael Hines	Ford Kiernan and Greg Hemphill	7 May 2004	3.14
Jack and Victor arrive in Canada to visit Fiona. Just like in Craiglang, the two get up to mischief while taking in the country's sights. Back home, Winston tries to ignore Isa's gossip while still enjoying her home cooking; as he continues seeing her even though Harry has left. Guest Starring: Stevie Allen, Finlay McLean, Steve Hemphill, and Munro Chambers
17	2	"Swottin"	Michael Hines	Ford Kiernan and Greg Hemphill	14 May 2004	3.66
Jack and Victor are back in Craiglang and on the hunt for more adventures - in this case, enrolling in a night school class for a first-aid course at the University of Glasgow. When they realise how cheap the alcohol at the university bar, they decide to skip classes and engage in boisterous antics with students young enough to be their grandchildren; unaware of the implications of their actions. They form a team with Winston and enter a quiz Boabby is hosting at the Clansman in order to boost the pub's popularity, but when a pregnant woman suddenly goes into labour, Jack & Victor end up being put forward to help. Guest Starring: Kate Dickie, Ryan Hassan and Bridget McCann
18	3	"Cairds"	Michael Hines	Ford Kiernan and Greg Hemphill	21 May 2004	3.52
Jack and Victor enlist the help of the community to win back Joe's mobility scooter from Tam via a rigged poker game. Shug, while helping out, is arrested on suspicion of voyeurism and luck is on Winston's side as his long-shot accumulator at the bookie's returns a big win - or does it? Guest Starring: John Buick
19	4	"Big Yin"	Michael Hines	Ford Kiernan and Greg Hemphill	28 May 2004	3.24
The neds are out of control in Craiglang. Jack and Victor recruit help from an old friend, Big Innes, who has moved away from Craiglang to Elgin. However, it is emphasised to everybody that Innes must not be given Midori under any circumstances. Winston gets a job at a supermarket and deals with workplace bullying in his own unique way. Guest Starring: Clive Russell, Jordan Young, and Sheila Latimer
20	5	"Oot"	Michael Hines	Ford Kiernan and Greg Hemphill	4 June 2004	2.98
Long-time recluse Archie, who hasn't left his home since 1966, is forced to do so as the block of flats he lives in is earmarked for demolition. Oblivious to world events and bewildered by decades of tangible change, he re-enters society under the care of Jack and Victor; also settling in to a new flat in Osprey Heights. Winston, meanwhile, inquires about a new, state-of-the-art television on the High Street but is put off by the expensive price. He makes plans to build his own, which is disastrously engulfed in fire, ironically, while the group are watching The Towering Inferno. Archie decides to go back to being a recluse after his flat is robbed; however, he buys Winston the expensive television set using social security money he had been hoarding for years. Guest Starring: Sylvester McCoy
21	6	"Aff"	Michael Hines	Ford Kiernan and Greg Hemphill	11 June 2004	3.44
Isa is frantic with worry after a tarot reader in The Clansman informs her she will be "run down by a silver car". Will she meet her date with destiny? Meanwhile, Winston is told by doctors his leg will need to be amputated, a consequence of years of smoking eighty cigarettes a day; albeit he takes solace in the news that he will qualify for extra money in invalidity benefits. Upon seeing Winston's leg, Jack throws his pipe in the bin and pledges never to smoke again. Elsewhere, Victor feigns illness in a bid to get more attention from his absent son, John, who files in from South Africa on hearing of his father's "illness". Guest Starring: Mary Riggans and Sandy Welsh

=== Series 4 (2005) ===
No. overall	No. in series	Title	Directed by	Written by	Original release date	Viewers (millions)
22	1	"Kill Wullie"	Michael Hines	Ford Kiernan and Greg Hemphill	22 July 2005	2.22
Jack and Victor's friend, Wullie, is dating a much younger woman. Rumours go around in Craiglang that his mistress is trying to "bump him off" and inherit Wullie's house after he dies. Meanwhile, Winston struggles with his new leg, and a young ned is conning Craiglang's pensioners out of money. Guest Starring: Jackie Farrell and Julie Miller Note: This is the first episode to receive a standard English title, as the show had begun to be broadcast in the rest of Britain by this point.
23	2	"Wireless"	Michael Hines	Ford Kiernan and Greg Hemphill	29 July 2005	1.83
Jack and Victor take up the job of DJs at the local hospital as stand-ins for Tam, who is away on holiday, and build up quite a fanbase in the process. Navid also ends up in hospital with a very personal problem. Guest Starring: Bill Murdoch, James Fleming and Sandy Neilson
24	3	"Dial-A-Bus"	Michael Hines	Ford Kiernan and Greg Hemphill	5 August 2005	2.15
Jack and Victor find themselves on a terrifying bus journey when the driver, Davie, has a mental breakdown. Meanwhile, Tam decides to tag along while Navid goes to get stock, and Boabby decides to take time off work to go cycling; leaving the Clansman under control of a temporary barman. Winston takes advantage of Boabby's absence by pretending to be the real owner of the Clansman. Guest Starring: Robbie Coltrane and Sharon McKenzie
25	4	"Ring"	Michael Hines	Ford Kiernan and Greg Hemphill	12 August 2005	1.72
Tam decides to marry Frances, his sweetheart from the second series. As always in Craiglang, things never go to plan. Meanwhile, Navid's shop is part of a big business take-over. Guest Starring: Michael McKenzie
26	5	"Hatch"	Michael Hines	Ford Kiernan and Greg Hemphill	19 August 2005	3.08
Jack has Sky TV, Victor does not; they solve this problem by arranging for Shug to put a "hatch" between their flats so that they can both watch. But things go wrong when Isa, peeking through the letterbox, suspects they are gay. Meanwhile, Winston has to look after his obnoxious seventeen-year old grandson Thomas while his parents go away on holiday. Guest Starring: Kevin Guthrie Note: This episode was removed from BBC iPlayer following Guthrie's conviction of sexual assault in 2021.
27	6	"Who's the Daddy?"	Michael Hines	Ford Kiernan and Greg Hemphill	26 August 2005	2.16
The Clansman is sold to Chris howden, a property developer, who plans to demolish it. However, Jack, Victor and Winston fear they may have unknowingly fathered Chris with Jenny Turnbull in their twenties. Whilst they try to determine who it may have been, Isa gets to the truth; revealing it was actually Pete the Jakey. The Clansman is saved, but is renamed "Jenny's", in honour of Chris's mother. Guest Starring: Martin Docherty and Vincent Friell
Christmas Special (2005)
28	–	"Cold Turkey"	Michael Hines	Ford Kiernan and Greg Hemphill	28 December 2005	3.07
Jack and Victor ruin their usual Christmas dinner arrangement after they upset Isa. Winston gets to grips with a live turkey he is conned into buying by a ned. Meanwhile, Frances dumps a ton of Christmas cards on Tam for him to deliver on Christmas Eve. Guest Starring: Mark Young and Michael MacKenzie

=== Series 5 (2006) ===
No. overall	No. in series	Title	Directed by	Written by	Original release date	Viewers (millions)
29	1	"Drama"	Michael Hines	Ford Kiernan and Greg Hemphill	19 June 2006	2.23
Jack and Victor learn about free whisky tasting sessions and win a visit to a distillery, where they cause havoc. Winston is in no mood to welcome the new bookie named "Frankie" to Craiglang, being certain that it's his old nemesis, Stevie. Guest Starring: John McCririck
30	2	"Fresh Lick"	Michael Hines	Ford Kiernan and Greg Hemphill	26 June 2006	2.48
Jack and Victor put on their decorator's overalls to redesign Isa's flat. In their usual style, the two don't execute it so well. Meanwhile, Tam discovers a certain video featuring Bobby and some scantily clad women. Guest Starring: Dougie Wallace
31	3	"Smoke on the Water"	Michael Hines	Ford Kiernan and Greg Hemphill	3 July 2006	2.57
Jack and Victor, along with Winston, sail the River Kelvin in celebration of Victor's seventy-fifth birthday. Unfortunately, a run-in with the local neds means things won't go smoothly. Guest Starring: James MacKenzie
32	4	"Hard Nuts"	Michael Hines	Ford Kiernan and Greg Hemphill	10 July 2006	2.31
Boabby the Barman has a chance to be on television. Unknown to him, the programme is Blighty's Hardest Boozers. Meanwhile, Navid goes through a midlife crisis and makes some changes. Guest Starring: John Jack and Bill Torrance
33	5	"All the Best"	Michael Hines	Ford Kiernan and Greg Hemphill	17 July 2006	2.94
Winston as he leaves Craiglang for a new life in the seaside resort of Finport; becoming disillusioned and depressed by his hometown. Meanwhile, Jack and Victor are chauffeurs for the day; picking up Fergie the ned's fiance, Sinead. Guest Starring: Juliet Cadzow and Iain Davidson
34	6	"Saucy"	Michael Hines	Ford Kiernan and Greg Hemphill	24 July 2006	2.18
Frances's sister, Molly, comes to visit and makes a huge impression on Tam, who is in awe of his sister-in-law's tight-fistedness. Meanwhile, Jack and Victor arrange to visit Winston in Finport but when they arrive, they find that all is not well. Note: Scenes set in Finport were filmed in Saltcoats and Largs, seaside towns in Ayrshire. Guest Starring: Dorothy Paul
Hogmanay Special (2006)
35	–	"The Party"	Michael Hines	Ford Kiernan and Greg Hemphill	31 December 2006 (Note: Originally broadcast on BBC One Scotland, it aired later on BBC Two on 1 January 2007)	3.87
Jack, Victor, Winston and Isa get stuck in a faulty Osprey Heights lift on their way to a Hogmanay party, leading them to reminisce about Hogmanay 1975; recalling some embarrassing flashbacks. Note: A similar plot occurs in the original stage play, but does not feature Isa. Guest Starring: Ronnie Letham and Grant Thomson

=== Series 6 (2007) ===
No. overall	No. in series	Title	Directed by	Written by	Original release date	Viewers (millions)
36	1	"Hot Seat"	Michael Hines	Ford Kiernan and Greg Hemphill	12 July 2007	2.90
Craiglang is in the midst of a heatwave and Jack and Victor have found the perfect place to relax in the park, on the ultimate bench. Unfortunately, Tam and Winston have the same idea. Isa receives bad news about her estranged husband Harry. Guest Starring: Grant Thomson & Doreen McGillivray
37	2	"Fly Society"	Michael Hines	Ford Kiernan and Greg Hemphill	19 July 2007	2.11
Jack and Victor get a taste of how the other half live when they pose as two wealthy socialites to impress a couple of widows, but the gang from Craiglang are not happy at missing out. Guest Starring: Una McLean, Jeannie Fisher & Ron Donachie
38	3	"Lights Out"	Michael Hines	Ford Kiernan and Greg Hemphill	26 July 2007	1.86
After an accident at the local substation involving a runaway lorry, Craiglang is plunged into darkness. After a crime wave occurs, the vulnerable pensioners start taking radical measures to protect themselves from the nightcrawlers. Guest Starring: John Buick & Johnny Mac
39	4	"Seconds Out"	Michael Hines	Ford Kiernan and Greg Hemphill	2 August 2007	2.09
When a new pizza restaurant opens in Craiglang, Boabby the barman and Stevie the bookie battle it out for the affection of the new pizza girl. Jack and Victor are hell bent on getting a free pizza now that Winston works there. Guest Starring: Jim Watt, Michelle McManus & John Buick
40	5	"Hyper"	Michael Hines	Ford Kiernan and Greg Hemphill	9 August 2007	2.18
Navid's business is suffering at the hands of the new corporate giant Hyperdales and his regular customers' loyalty is being put to the test. Meanwhile, an electric shock causes Tam to go through some bizarre changes in behaviour. Eventually, Navid cracks and tries to burn down Hyperdales; causing him, Jack, Victor, Winston and Tam to be locked in for the night. Guest Starring: Trish Mullen
41	6	"Recipe"	Michael Hines	Ford Kiernan and Greg Hemphill	16 August 2007	1.98
Jack and Victor discover Pete the Jakey was the inventor of the locally popular Beefy Bake pastry, who claims that the idea was stolen from him by his employer which is what led to his alcoholism and eventual vagrancy. Jack and Victor seek recompense on his behalf. Meanwhile, Tam and Frances are having marital problems. Trivia: In Pete's trial it is argued that Pete invented the Beefy Bake on Sunday, 15 September 1979. However, this day was actually a Saturday. Note: This episode was removed from BBC iPlayer in 2026 following Potts's guilty plea and later conviction for making and distributing indecent images of children. Guest Starring: Eric Potts and Gary Lamont
42	7	"One in One Out"	Michael Hines	Ford Kiernan and Greg Hemphill	23 August 2007	2.08
Tam and Frances enjoy fame and fortune with their new baby, but it means babysitting stints for Jack and Victor; the former suffers a heart attack from the stress and requires bypass surgery. Could this be the end for the duo? Guest Starring: Lorraine Kelly and Michael Hines
Christmas Special (2007)
43	–	"Plum Number"	Michael Hines	Ford Kiernan and Greg Hemphill	23 December 2007	2.28
Jack and Victor join the choir. Winston offers to cover for the lollipop man while he's away, after learning that the job can be very rewarding during Christmas. Boabby gets a new puggy for The Clansman that boasts a jackpot of £1,000. Tam enlists the help of Shug and Eric to intercept the slot machine's pay-out ratio but soon, they are joined by Jack and Victor who want their slice of the action. Guest Starring: Iain McColl, Paul Donnelly & Dave Anderson Note: Last appearance of Jake D'Arcy as Pete the Jakey
Hogmanay Special (2007)
44	–	"Hootenanny"	Michael Hines	Ford Kiernan and Greg Hemphill	31 December 2007	2.59
Jack, Victor, Winston and Tam decide to spend their Hogmanay in a cottage on the remote island of Tighnahulish. Their celebrations are short-lived, when Jack and Victor manage to antagonise the island's few residents. Meanwhile, in Craiglang, Navid is left to enjoy a brief yet bitter taste of single life, whilst his wife, Meena, is on holiday in India. Guest Starring: John Buick, Lewis Howden & Michelle Gallagher
Children in Need Special (2014)
–	–	"Still Game at River City"	Unknown	Unknown	15 November 2014	N/A
Jack and Victor win tickets to see River City being filmed and Isa turns a new Career in becoming an Extra. Guest Starring: Sally Howitt, Billy McEnhaley, Jordan Young, Carmen Pieraccini & Michael Hines

=== Series 7 (2016) ===
On 12 May 2016, Ford and Greg announced a new series of Still Game was in the works. Filming of the long-awaited seventh series commenced on 4 July 2016, with the series airing in late 2016 on BBC One nationwide. All of the original main cast reprised their roles. Recurring character Pete "The Jakey" McCormack did not return, as he had been played by actor Jake D'Arcy who died in May 2015. The character's death was announced in the second episode, "The Undrinkables", which was dedicated to the actors' memory.

No. overall	No. in series	Title	Directed by	Written by	Original release date	Viewers (millions)
45	1	"Gadgets"	Michael Hines	Ford Kiernan and Greg Hemphill	7 October 2016	4.31
Craiglang's residents can't resist the temptation of the Futuroo catalogue and its innovations to "make life that wee bit easier". However, it quickly becomes apparent these gadgets do anything but make life easier. Winston receives a registered letter which sees him prepare for the arrival of his brother, Walter. As Jack and Victor spar over whose gadget is best, there's a spot of sibling rivalry between Winston and Walter. Guest Starring: David Ireland and Gary Miller
46	2	"The Undrinkables"	Michael Hines	Ford Kiernan and Greg Hemphill	14 October 2016	4.37
Jack and Victor receive the sad news that dear old friend, Pete the Jakey, has died. Pete may have been homeless, but he held a special place in the heart of Craiglang's community. Drink prices are going up, Jack and Victor try to go teetotal and Boabby gives up the tenancy of The Clansman, but illicit and dangerous moonshine suddenly appears on the estate and no-one seems to know its source. Jack and Victor wrongly accuse Tam after smashing up his kitchen. Later, as everyone gathers at the Clansman after Pete's funeral, tight-fisted Tam still can't find it in himself to contribute to the kitty. Beyond the grave, Pete leaves his legacy with Boabby and Winston through his pal, Methadone Mick. Guest Starring: Frank Gilhooley
47	3	"Job"	Michael Hines	Ford Kiernan and Greg Hemphill	21 October 2016	3.94
Charity begins at home, as Jack and Victor offer a helping hand to Methadone Mick; a £4,000 parking fine from the past comes back to haunt Winston, and Boabby's award glory goes awry when he has to decide whom to take to the City Chambers when he receives his Citizen Civic Medal, as Shug concocts a daring plan to get Winston off the hook.... Guest Starring: Kevin Whately and Barbara Rafferty
48	4	"Small Change"	Michael Hines	Ford Kiernan and Greg Hemphill	28 October 2016	3.33
Affairs of the heart stir up emotions as when Jack and Victor offer unconventional marriage guidance to Fergie and his wife Sinead, their advice proves to be less than helpful. Meanwhile, Navid and Boabby swap jobs to prove who really has it the hardest, after Boabby struggles to see bargains in Navid's shop when him and Meena have a special rollback day to celebrate forty years of being in business. Guest Starring: Claire Gray Wilson and Louise Stewart
49	5	"Heavy Petting"	Michael Hines	Ford Kiernan and Greg Hemphill	4 November 2016	3.01
Jack and Victor decide to become dog sitters and enlist the help of computer-savvy Isa to register them on the "Pets Home From Home" website. Meanwhile Isa limbers up for the Craiglang Bake Off and locks whisks with local cake rival, Peggy. Utterly determined to beat the reigning baking champion, Isa strong-arms her pals into becoming reluctant cake-tasting guinea pigs. Guest Starring: Paul-James Corrigan
50	6	"Down and Out"	Michael Hines	Ford Kiernan and Greg Hemphill	11 November 2016	3.17
Emotions run high as Jack, Victor and the Craiglang residents gather to watch the demolition of a tower block, only to later find out that Osprey Heights is also condemned. Jack, Victor and Isa are decanted to a local care home that turns out to be run like a prison camp by its authoritarian manager, whilst Tam and Winston embark on a new money making scam which almost ends in disaster.... Guest Starring: Jackie Bird, Ronni Ancona and Sheila Donald

=== Series 8 (2018) ===
The eighth series of Still Game aired from 8 March to 12 April 2018, in Wales it aired on BBC Two only

No. overall	No. in series	Title	Directed by	Written by	Original release date	Viewers (millions)
51	1	"Fly Fishing"	Michael Hines	Ford Kiernan and Greg Hemphill	8 March 2018	3.75
Winston appeals to his friends for help as asbestos forces him out of his flat. Isa's birthday is on the horizon and she's on a mission to find out who's throwing her a surprise party. Boabby turfs the regulars out of the Clansman, so they hide in the flat upstairs, stealing booze through a hole cut in the floor, and fishing the alcohol with wires and tack. Guest Starring: Steven Duffy and Sheena Penson
52	2	"Grim Up North"	Michael Hines	Ford Kiernan and Greg Hemphill	15 March 2018	3.88
Death comes calling to Craiglang when a new undertaker arrives and - for at least one resident - it's time to meet their maker. As new undertaker I.D Sheathing arrives in Craiglang, it's not long before Isa begins to tell everybody all about him, involving a story about attending the funeral of a young girl, and Sheathing patting a man on the shoulder, and the man dying a week later; Methadone Mick backs her up, with similar stories of his fellow homeless dying due to this funeral director. But is Sheathing really who they believe him to be? Eric falsely claims to have had sex with Gina Lollobrigida in Rome in 1958. He dies at the fruit machine after being touched by Sheathing, although it is later established that Eric died of heart failure, having been ill for some time. Guest Starring: Bruce Morton and Fiona Knowles Note: Last appearance of James Martin as Eric
53	3	"Balls Up"	Michael Hines	Ford Kiernan and Greg Hemphill	22 March 2018	N/A
It's a must-win match which sees Jack, Victor and the rest of the Craiglang gang in sporting spirit as they take part in a walking football tournament, where the prize is a new community centre astroturf. Boabby suffers a heart attack and has to have eighteen stents put in. Methadone Mick gets a job as the football mascot but can't help show that the Craiglang team are who he likes best, even going so far as to injure the opposition. Guest Starring: Bruce Morton, Neil Leiper, Ralph Riach and Julie Wilson Nimmo
54	4	"South Africa"	Michael Hines	Ford Kiernan and Greg Hemphill	29 March 2018	N/A
Jack and Victor pack their bags for a night away that they'll never forget - even if they want to, as they discover Navid and Meena own a caravan. They go away for the night, with Winston in tow, but almost from the beginning, everything appears to go wrong, including Victor eating an entire jam roly-poly, Winston leaving something unholy in the caravan's toilet, and Jack forgetting the alcohol, forcing Winston to go into town to get alcohol and pizza for them - but he promptly spends all the money in the pub on himself! In amongst laughing about old times, including romantic encounters, can they keep the caravan tidy for Navid and Meena? Guest Starring: Estrid Barton
55	5	"Pie"	Michael Hines	Ford Kiernan and Greg Hemphill	5 April 2018	N/A
The residents become suspicious of Tam's motives, when he befriends an elderly woman who has a lot of money. Meanwhile, at the Butchers, Jack & Victor, and half of Craiglang are trying to get their hands on the last steak pie in the shop. Guest Starring: Alison Peebles, Colin McCredie, Benny Young, Bruce Morton, and Dolina MacLennan.
56	6	"The Fall Guy"	Michael Hines	Ford Kiernan and Greg Hemphill	12 April 2018	N/A
Isa's pulse is set racing when her long-lost friend, retired Hollywood stuntman Callum Coburn, returns to Craiglang. Elsewhere, Boabby has decided to learn how to drive, but it turns out driving lessons are harder than he thinks. Methadone Mick starts a course over the Internet. Guest Starring: Craig Ferguson, Bruce Morton, and Maureen Carr

=== Series 9 (2019) ===
The ninth series was broadcast from February to March 2019 on the new BBC Scotland channel. Ford Kiernan and Greg Hemphill stated this will be the final series. Filming on the ninth series began in August 2018.

No. overall	No. in series	Title	Directed by	Written by	Original release date	Viewers (millions)
57	1	"Local Hero"	Michael Hines	Ford Kiernan and Greg Hemphill	24 February 2019 (BBC Scotland); 21 June 2019 (BBC One)	N/A
Winston saves the day by thwarting a mugger attacking Isa and becomes an internet sensation. Meanwhile, Jack and Victor have one mix-up too many so decide it's time to get mobile phones, but will they be able to get past the mumbo jumbo? Guest Starring: Martin Compston, Gianni Capaldi and Des Clarke
58	2	"Cat's Whiskers"	Michael Hines	Ford Kiernan and Greg Hemphill	28 February 2019 (BBC Scotland); 5 July 2019 (BBC One)	N/A
Twilight Monthly magazine needs a new cover star and Victor is convinced he's the man for the job, sparking interest among the rest of Craiglang. Meanwhile, Winston battles with a neighbour to win a stray cat's affections, and Navid has to deal with a young and very persistent shoplifter. Guest Starring: Maureen Carr, John Buick
59	3	"Dead Leg, Part One"	Michael Hines	Ford Kiernan and Greg Hemphill	7 March 2019 (BBC Scotland); 12 July 2019 (BBC One)	N/A
Winston receives wounding news about his remaining leg. Meanwhile, Isa struggles with her new cleaning job at the undertaker's and Tam pushes his skinflintishness to new depths, which results in him getting barred from the Clansman and falling out with Winston. The episode ends with Tam dying, and Isa accidentally ruining the ramp that the boys have tried building when going to tell them the news. Guest Starring: Bruce Morton
60	4	"Dead Leg, Part Two"	Michael Hines	Ford Kiernan and Greg Hemphill	14 March 2019 (BBC Scotland); 19 July 2019 (BBC One)	N/A
A trip to the cinema creates a mystery for Jack and Victor, Boabby and Winston look for love through internet dating, and the Craiglang gang try to make sense of bizarre goings-on. The question: is Tam really dead? Guest Starring: Bruce Morton, John Buick, Joanna Tope, Hazel Anne Crawford and Sheena Penson
61	5	"Hitched"	Michael Hines	Ford Kiernan and Greg Hemphill	21 March 2019 (BBC Scotland); 26 July 2019 (BBC One)	N/A
Love is in the air as the gang rally together to create an unforgettable wedding day for one of the pals. Guest Starring: Joanna Tope, Clare Grogan, Midge Ure, Amy Macdonald and The Bluebells
62	6	"Over the Hill"	Michael Hines	Ford Kiernan and Greg Hemphill	28 March 2019 (BBC Scotland); 2 August 2019 (BBC One)	N/A
It's time for Jack and Victor to take on climbing Ben Lomond, as they reflect the marching of time, whilst Isa is trying to curb her addiction to helping animal charities, which has left her financially crippled. Winston, Tam, Isa, Navid, and Boabby all decide to join in for the expedition up Ben Lomond, however they get too drunk when camping at the foot of the hill the night before, where the group reminisce over their past lives. Jack and Victor decide to make the ascent alone the following morning, at which point the episode changes to a final montage of each of the main characters fading out of frame - hinting at the inevitable time in the future when they won't be around anymore but everyday life in Craiglang will go on. The final scene shows the inside of The Clansman with a new set of regulars but with a much older Boabby behind the bar greeting the viewer. This is the one and only time you see Meena's face. Guest Starring: Gary Lewis

== Documentaries (2014–2019) ==
No.	Title	Directed by	Written by	Original release date	Viewers (millions)
1	"The Story So Far"	Unknown	Unknown	31 December 2014	0.817
A salute to Scotland's favourite TV OAPs in a special programme that puts the spotlight on the celebrated Criaiglang gang. We focus on the jaunty journey Jack and Victor have taken the nation on since they first appeared on the small screen. Contributors include: actor Martin Compston, TV presenter Lorraine Kelly and film star Robbie Coltrane, with insights from Rebecca Cochrane.
2	"That's Plenty"	Unknown	Unknown	28 March 2019	TBD
Tribute to the comedy following on from the final episode, with contributions from stars and celebrity fans. Presented by Grant Stott and Des Clarke.
