= Unseen character =

Character referred to but not directly known to the audience

An unseen character in theatre, comics, film or television, or a silent character in radio or literature, is a character who is mentioned but not directly known to the audience, but who advances the action of the plot in a significant way, and whose absence enhances their effect on the plot.

== History ==
Unseen characters have been used since the beginning of theatre with the ancient Greek tragedians, such as Laius in Sophocles' Oedipus Rex and Jason's bride in Euripides' Medea, and continued into Elizabethan theatre with examples such as Rosaline in William Shakespeare's play Romeo and Juliet. However, it was the early 20th-century European playwrights August Strindberg, Henrik Ibsen and Anton Chekhov who fully developed the dramatic potential of the unseen character. Eugene O'Neill was influenced by his European contemporaries and established the absent character as an aspect of character, narrative and stagecraft in American theatre.

== Purpose and characteristics ==
Unseen characters are causal figures included in dramatic works to motivate the onstage characters to a certain course of action and advance the plot, but their presence is unnecessary. Indeed, their absence makes them appear more powerful because they are only known by inference. The use of an unseen character "take[s] advantage of one of the simplest but most powerful theatrical devices: the manner in which verbal references can make an offstage character extraordinarily real [...] to an audience," exploiting the audience's tendency to create visual images of imaginary characters in their mind.

In a study of 18th-century French comedy, F. C. Green suggests that an "invisible character" can be defined as one who, though not seen, "influences the action of the play". This definition, according to Green, would rule out a character like Laurent (Lawrence), Tartuffe's unseen valet, whose sole function is merely to give the playwright an opportunity to introduce Tartuffe.

Unseen characters can develop organically even when their creators initially did not expect to keep them as unseen, especially in episodic works like television series. For instance, the producers of Frasier initially did not want to make the character Niles Crane's wife Maris an unseen character because they did not want to draw parallels to Vera, Norm Peterson's wife on Cheers, of which Frasier was a spin-off. They originally intended that Maris would appear after several episodes, but were enjoying writing excuses for her absence so eventually it was decided she would remain unseen, and after the increasingly eccentric characteristics ascribed to her, no real actress could realistically portray her.

== Examples ==
=== Comics ===
- Al Capp introduced Lena the Hyena in June 1946 as an invisible character in the Li'l Abner newspaper strip. She was described as "the world's ugliest woman". Characters always reacted in fright when they saw her or an image of her but readers couldn't see her because she was hidden behind objects or out of frame. Eventually Capp organized a contest in which readers could send in their own graphic interpretations of what she might look like. The winner was cartoonist Basil Wolverton, whose design was first shown in the 21 October 1946 strip.
- In Jim Davis' Garfield, Jon's neighbor, Mrs. Feeny, who often calls to complain about Garfield damaging her house and killing (and often eating) her pets, is regularly unseen. Her interactions with Jon are often limited to one-way phone calls that only feature Jon talking to her.
- In Merho's comics series De Kiekeboes Mevrouw Stokvis, a friend of Moemoe Kiekeboe, is always mentioned or referred to, but has never actually been seen in the series.

=== Theatre ===
Unseen characters occur elsewhere in drama, including the plays of Eugene O'Neill, Tennessee Williams and Edward Albee. The author Marie A. Wellington notes that in the 18th century Voltaire included unseen characters in a few of his plays, including Le Duc d’Alençon and L’Orphelin de la Chine.

- Rosaline in William Shakespeare's Romeo and Juliet is never seen, but is only described.
- In Alain-René Lesage's 1707 play Crispin, an unseen character called Damis with his forced secret marriage is essential to the plot.
- Mrs Grundy, an unseen character in Thomas Morton's 1798 play Speed the Plough, has become a byword for disapproving propriety.
- In Clare Boothe Luce's 1936 play The Women and the 1939 film based on it, male characters are discussed but never shown, even in photographs.
- Godot in Samuel Beckett's Waiting for Godot is never seen. The play's two main characters spend the entire play waiting for Godot to arrive.
- In Anton Chekhov's play Three Sisters, Protopopov, who is cuckolding his employee Andrei and having a torrid and far from secret affair with Natasha, is unseen but plays a central role. Some sources suggest Protopopov, not Andrei, is the real father of Natasha's daughter.
- The titular character in Mike Leigh's play Abigail's Party, the 15-year-old daughter of Susan Lawson, is attending a party next door to the events portrayed in the play, and is never seen.

=== British television and radio ===
- Dad's Army: Mrs Elizabeth Mainwaring, the wife of Captain Mainwaring, is never seen with the exception of the episode "A Soldier's Farewell" when her great weight in the bunk above Captain Mainwaring's causes her mattress to sag into camera shot. She appears in the 2016 movie.
- Minder: Arthur Daley's wife, referred to only as "'Er Indoors", is never seen or heard, but often quoted.
- Hi-de-Hi!: Joe Maplin, the tyrannical and philandering owner of holiday camps, remains unseen (other than a statue of Maplin near the camp entrance). He communicated with his staff via hectoring, semi-literate letters that are read aloud by the character Jeffrey Fairbrother. The acting role was intended for Bob Monkhouse but he was unavailable for filming.
- Keeping Up Appearances: Hyacinth Bucket has a phone conversation (in which the audience only hears her side) in each episode with her son Sheridan, who has moved out and is attending university.
- Only Fools and Horses: Monkey Harris, Ugandan Morris, Sunglasses Ron and Paddy the Greek, Del Boy's business associates. Paddy the Greek and Monkey Harris are mentioned in many episodes, often sourcing Del’s shoddy merchandise, yet are never seen. They are often described in discussions about wild nights down The Nag's Head, or being banged up at the Scrubs (inferring that one or all are serving a gaol sentence). On one occasion Del Boy is beaten up on Rodney’s behalf. Rather than admit the truth of his injuries he claims to have fallen down the stairs at Monkey Harris’ house. It transpires Harris lives in a bungalow.
- Still Game: As a running gag, Meena (Navid's wife and co-owner of Harrid's Convenience Stores) always has her face either obscured by an object or a person, or positioned such that it is hidden from the camera. Meena is never seen until a brief appearance in the 2019 series finale, "Over the Hill".
- The Archers: In this long-running British radio soap opera, a number of permanent inhabitants of the village in which the story is set are frequently referred to but are never heard in their own voices. Fans of the programme often refer to these characters as "the silents".
- Heartbeat: Throughout its entire 18-year run, PC Alf Ventress refers to his wife Mrs. Ventress, but she is neither seen nor is her first name ever revealed.

=== American television ===
- On The Andy Griffith Show, Juanita Beasley, for whom Barney Fife occasionally expresses affection, is unseen but often referenced and telephoned by the lovestruck Fife.
- In Charlie's Angels, the titular Charlie Townsend, the owner of the detective agency that employed the series leads, was never seen, and was portrayed solely as a voice (provided by actor John Forsythe) heard on a speakerphone.
- On the sitcom Diff'rent Strokes, "The Gooch" is a recurring bully who terrorizes Arnold. He returns a few seasons later to bully Sam and is finally defeated by a foreign exchange student, Carmella, but is never seen.
- On the mystery drama Columbo, Lieutenant Columbo often describes his wife in detail but she is never seen, heard, or otherwise portrayed in the series. A short-lived, unsuccessful spin-off series Mrs. Columbo, featuring Kate Mulgrew, was created in 1979 after Columbo had ended its run. Lieutenant Columbo himself never appeared in the spinoff show, which was quickly retconned (and the title character renamed) to remove all associations with the original program.
- On The Mary Tyler Moore Show, Phyllis Lindstrom's husband, Dr. Lars Lindstrom, is often referenced but never seen.
- On Rhoda, Carlton, the doorman in Rhoda Morgenstern's apartment building, is often heard on the intercom (voiced by Lorenzo Music) but almost never seen – only his arm would occasionally appear from doors, and he was once shown dancing and conversing while wearing a gorilla mask. After Rhoda ended its run, Carlton was featured as an animated character in the 1980 spin-off special Carlton Your Doorman. Once again voiced by Music, Carlton is shown as a young man with shoulder-length blond hair and mustache.
- On teen drama series My So-Called Life, the character Tino is mentioned in a majority of episodes by one or more of the main characters, and is descriptively developed into an edgy, cool persona. Despite apparently being a role-model to Jordan Catalano, singing in Catalano's band, and helping to drive the plot by actions such as throwing parties, Tino is never actually seen onscreen.
- Vera Peterson from Cheers and Maris Crane from its spin-off Frasier are two of the most widely recognized unseen characters of American television, though Vera's body (with her face obscured by a pie) is seen in one episode, and her voice is heard in other episodes. Her voice was provided by Bernadette Birkett, the real-life wife of George Wendt who portrayed Norm Peterson, leading Wendt to comment that he never personally wondered what Vera looked like. Maris is also seen as a silhouette, and as a figure covered in a full body cast.
- On Seinfeld, Bob Sacamano, Lomez, and "Cousin Jeffrey" are often mentioned but never seen. The first two are friends of Cosmo Kramer, and the last is the cousin of Jerry Seinfeld. Jeffrey works for the New York City Parks Department, as Jerry is told ad nauseam by his Uncle Leo.
- Stan Walker, the wealthy husband of Karen Walker on Will & Grace, has been depicted on screen only as hands and feet. Karen and Stan have divorced twice over the show's run, once after Stan faked his own death, leading the website CollegeHumor to label him as the one unseen character who "arguably drives the plot more than any other unseen character on a TV show".
- On the Netflix animated television series BoJack Horseman, Mr. Peanutbutter often shouts to an off-screen, implicitly outlandish character known as "Erica".
- On The Golden Girls, Dorothy Zbornak's brother, Phil Petrillo is frequently mentioned but never seen. Phil is known to be a straight, married, cross-dresser. However, his wife, Angela, appeared in one episode.
