= Dan Ratushny =

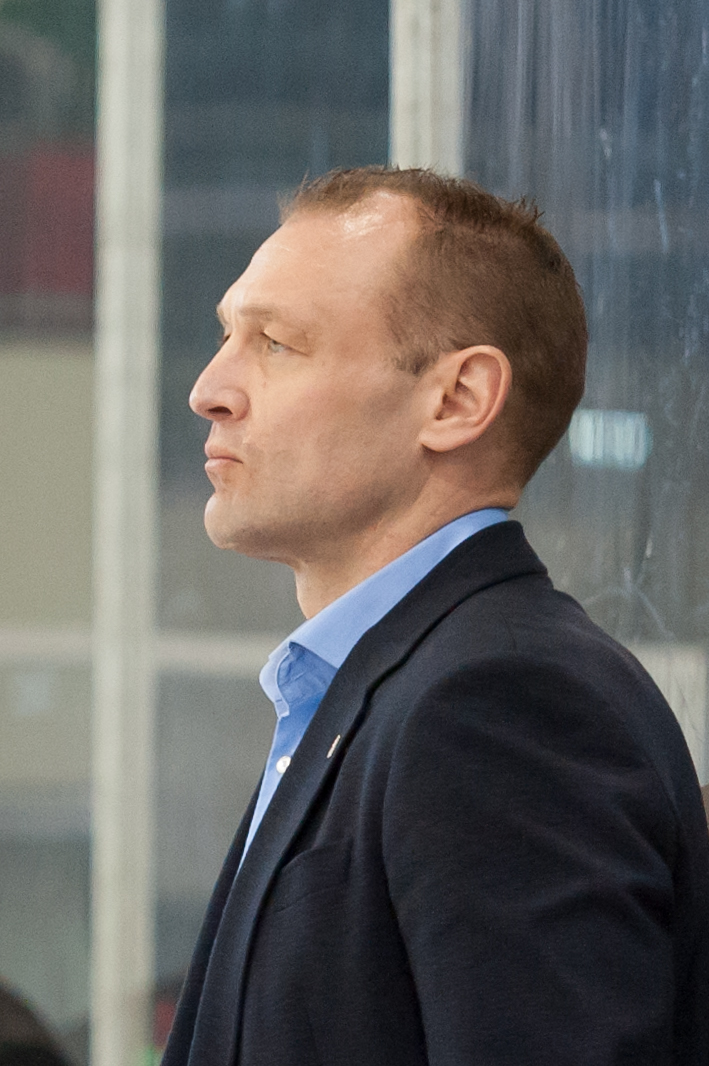
- Born: October 29, 1970 (age 55) Nepean, Ontario, Canada
- Height: 6 ft 1 in (185 cm)
- Weight: 205 lb (93 kg; 14 st 9 lb)
- Position: Defence
- Shot: Right
- Played for: Vancouver Canucks; EHC Olten; HPK; Ayr Scottish Eagles; Dundee Stars
- National team: Canada
- NHL draft: 25th overall, 1989; Winnipeg Jets
- Playing career: 1992–2006

Daniel Paul Ratushny (born October 29, 1970) is a Canadian professional ice hockey coach, lawyer, and sports arbitrator. A former professional ice hockey defenceman, he last served as head coach of Lausanne HC of the Swiss top-flight National League A (NLA).

== Playing career ==
Ratushny was selected 25th overall in the 1989 NHL entry draft by the Winnipeg Jets following his freshman season at Cornell University. He spent two more seasons at Cornell and was named All-America and ECAC first-team all-star in both 1990 and 1991. He would also represent Canada at the 1990 IIHF World U20 Championship, winning a gold medal.

Ratushny left college hockey after his junior year to join the Canadian National Team to participate at the 1992 Olympics (at the time, the national team was stocked with amateur players, as professional participation at the Olympics was prohibited). He spent the conclusion of the 1990–91 and the entire 1991–92 seasons with the national team, winning a silver medal at the 1992 Winter Olympics in Albertville, France.

Ratushny finished the 1991–92 season in Switzerland with EHC Olten before signing with the IHL Fort Wayne Komets for the 1992-93 season. He was dealt to the Vancouver Canucks at the NHL trade deadline in 1993, but only played one game for the Canucks.

From 1993 until 1999, Ratushny played in the AHL and IHL before continuing his career abroad in Japan, Finland, the United Kingdom and Sweden.

== Education and legal work ==
Daniel received his B.Sc. in Economics from Cornell in 1997. He earned his M.B.A. from Strathclyde Business School in 2003 and his LL.B. from the University of Ottawa Faculty of Law in 2006.

From 2006 until 2009, Ratushny worked as a lawyer in the corporate department of the international law firm Stikeman Elliott.

In 2015 he earned his Executive Master in International Sports Law from ISDE in Madrid, Spain and is currently a sports arbitrator.

== Coaching career ==
He served as assistant coach at the University of Ottawa in 2004-05.

From 2009 until 2011, Ratushny was the head coach of the Swiss National League B team EHC Olten. In 2011, he became head coach of the Straubing Tigers of the Deutsche Eishockey Liga (DEL) for three seasons. In the 2011-12 season, he led the Tigers to the DEL playoff semifinals and was named DEL Coach of the Year.

He signed with EC Red Bull Salzburg of the Austrian Hockey League (EBEL) in 2014 and was named head coach of the Austrian national team. Ratushny guided Salzburg to the championship his first year, repeating this success the following season (2015–16).

In April 2016, he was named head coach of Lausanne HC of the Swiss top-flight National League A (NLA). In May 2016, he stepped down from his position as head coach of the Austrian national team to focus on his job in Lausanne. He guided the team to a fourth-place finish in the 2016-17 regular season, while being named NLA Regular Season Coach of the Year. Ratushny was sacked on October 11, 2017, after LHC had garnered twelve points from the first ten games of the 2017-18 season.

== Other work ==
Ratushny makes a brief speaking appearance as a passenger aboard Jack and Victor's flight to Toronto in "Dug", an episode of the Scottish sitcom Still Game.

== Awards and honors ==
Medal record

Men's ice hockey

Olympic Games
| Silver medal – second place | 1992 Albertville | Team |

| Award | Year |
|---|---|
| All-ECAC Hockey Rookie Team | 1988–89 |
| All-ECAC Hockey First Team | 1989–90 |
| AHCA East Second-Team All-American | 1989–90 |
| ECAC Hockey All-Tournament Team | 1990 |
| All-ECAC Hockey First Team | 1990–91 |
| AHCA East First-Team All-American | 1990–91 |
| German DEL Coach of the Year | 2011-12 |
| Swiss NLA Coach of the Year | 2016-17 |
| Cornell University Athletics Hall of Fame | 2018 |

== Career statistics ==
=== Regular season and playoffs ===
| | | | Regular season | | | | | Playoffs |
| Season | Team | League | GP | G | A | Pts | PIM | GP | G | A | Pts | PIM |
|---|---|---|---|---|---|---|---|---|---|---|---|---|
| 1987–88 | Nepean Raiders | CJHL | 54 | 8 | 20 | 28 | 116 | — | — | — | — | — |
| 1988–89 | Cornell University | ECAC | 28 | 2 | 13 | 15 | 50 | — | — | — | — | — |
| 1988–89 | Canada | Intl | 2 | 0 | 0 | 0 | 2 | — | — | — | — | — |
| 1989–90 | Cornell University | ECAC | 26 | 5 | 14 | 19 | 54 | — | — | — | — | — |
| 1990–91 | Cornell University | ECAC | 26 | 7 | 24 | 31 | 52 | — | — | — | — | — |
| 1990–91 | Canada | Intl | 12 | 0 | 1 | 1 | 6 | — | — | — | — | — |
| 1991–92 | Canada | Intl | 58 | 5 | 13 | 18 | 63 | — | — | — | — | — |
| 1991–92 | EHC Olten | NDA | 2 | 0 | 0 | 0 | 2 | — | — | — | — | — |
| 1992–93 | Vancouver Canucks | NHL | 1 | 0 | 1 | 1 | 2 | — | — | — | — | — |
| 1992–93 | Fort Wayne Komets | IHL | 63 | 6 | 19 | 25 | 48 | — | — | — | — | — |
| 1993–94 | Hamilton Canucks | AHL | 62 | 8 | 31 | 39 | 22 | 4 | 0 | 0 | 0 | 4 |
| 1994–95 | Fort Wayne Komets | IHL | 72 | 3 | 25 | 28 | 46 | 4 | 0 | 1 | 1 | 8 |
| 1995–96 | Peoria Rivermen | IHL | 45 | 7 | 15 | 22 | 45 | 12 | 3 | 4 | 7 | 10 |
| 1995–96 | Carolina Monarchs | AHL | 23 | 5 | 10 | 15 | 28 | — | — | — | — | — |
| 1996–97 | Québec Rafales | IHL | 50 | 14 | 23 | 37 | 34 | — | — | — | — | — |
| 1997–98 | Albany River Rats | AHL | 39 | 8 | 5 | 13 | 10 | 9 | 0 | 3 | 3 | 8 |
| 1997–98 | Québec Rafales | IHL | 20 | 3 | 9 | 12 | 22 | — | — | — | — | — |
| 1998–99 | Kansas City Blades | IHL | 70 | 9 | 32 | 41 | 38 | 3 | 0 | 0 | 0 | 4 |
| 1999–2000 | Seibu Tetsudo | JPN | 27 | 2 | 11 | 13 | — | — | — | — | — | — |
| 2000–01 | HPK | Liiga | 42 | 4 | 6 | 10 | 62 | — | — | — | — | — |
| 2002–03 | Scottish Eagles | GBR | 4 | 0 | 1 | 1 | 2 | — | — | — | — | — |
| 2002–03 | Dundee Stars | GBR II | 19 | 8 | 23 | 31 | 12 | 5 | 0 | 1 | 1 | 2 |
| 2005–06 | IK Pantern | SWE III | 29 | 6 | 18 | 24 | 36 | — | — | — | — | — |
| IHL totals | | | 320 | 42 | 123 | 165 | 233 | 19 | 3 | 5 | 8 | 22 |
| AHL totals | | | 124 | 21 | 46 | 67 | 60 | 13 | 0 | 3 | 3 | 12 |

=== International ===
| Year | Team | Event | GP | G | A | Pts | PIM |
|---|---|---|---|---|---|---|---|
| 1990 | Canada | WJC | 7 | 2 | 2 | 4 | 4 |
| 1992 | Canada | OG | 8 | 0 | 0 | 0 | 4 |
