= Mark Cox (actor) =

Scottish actor and comedian (born 1972)

- Born: 25 February 1972 (age 54); Springboig, Glasgow, Scotland
- Occupation: Actor
- Known for: Chewin' The Fat (1999–2005); Still Game (2002–2019)

Mark Cox (born 25 February 1972) is a Scottish comedian and actor, best known for his role as Tam Mullen in the sitcom Still Game.

== Life and career ==
Cox was born in Springboig, Glasgow in 1972. He attended Saint Andrew's Roman Catholic Secondary School in the East End. He then studied at Edinburgh’s Queen Margaret University School of Drama and trained as an actor, gaining a diploma in drama in 1993.

Cox worked with the creators of Still Game in their successful sketch show Chewin' The Fat between 1999 and 2005. From 2002 to 2019, he played Tam Mullen, a local miser in the BBC comedy sitcom Still Game.

It was announced in 2006 that Cox would narrate the Roald Dahl favourite, Three Little Pigs. It made its stage debut at the Glasgow Royal Concert Hall, set to music by composer Paul Patterson.

In 2007, Cox made writing contributions to the BBC Scotland TV show Dear Green Place, which starred his fellow Still Game actors Paul Riley and Ford Kiernan.

In 2014, Cox rejoined the Still Game cast for a sell-out run of live shows in Glasgow at the Hydro which culminated in a final 2019 performance. In 2019, he also played a senior Scottish police officer in Only an Excuse?.

He was awarded an Honorary Doctorate for his contribution to Scotland’s drama and arts scene by his alma mater Queen Margaret University in July 2022.

In January 2025, he co-hosted a Burns Night supper for Spina Bifida Hydrocephalus, which raised £96,000 in 2025 to support those affected. In 2025, he played Duncan Finlay in Dept Q on Netflix, alongside Still Game co-star Sanjeev Kohli. He also toured Scotland with a personal show, a mixture of comedy and personal reflection.
