= Jack Jarvis (disambiguation) =

Jack Jarvis may refer to:

- Jack Jarvis, a former British trainer of racehorses
- Jack Jarvis (Still Game character), a character from a Scottish sitcom Still Game
- Jack Jarvis (cricketer), an English born Scottish cricketer
