= Mike Hines =

Mike Hines may refer to:

- Mike Hines (baseball) (1862–1910), Major League Baseball catcher
- Mike Hines (snooker player) (born 1945), South African snooker player

== See also ==
- Michael Hines, television and film director
