= Effingee Productions =

Television production company

Effingee Productions is a television production company known for its comedy in Scotland. It was created by Greg Hemphill and Ford Kiernan of Chewin' the Fat and Still Game.

== TV Productions ==
| Title | Year |
|---|---|
| Chewin' the Fat | 1999–2002 |
| Still Game | 2002–2007; 2014-2019 |
| Dear Green Place | 2007–2008 |
| Happy Hollidays | 2009 |
