= Jane McCarry =

Scottish actress (born 1970)

- Born: Glasgow, Scotland
- Education: Queen Margaret University
- Occupations: Actress; presenter; teacher
- Years active: 1990–present
- Notable work: Still Game; Me Too
- Children: 2

Jane McCarry is a Scottish actress, presenter and teacher. She is best known for her roles as Isa Drennan in the BBC Scotland long running sitcom Still Game (2002-2019), and as Granny Murray in the CBeebies show Me Too! (2006-2008). She trained as an actor at Edinburgh's Queen Margaret University School of Drama.

== Career ==
Beginning in 2006, McCarry appeared in the children's programme, Me Too! as the middle-aged childminder, Granny Murray. Similar to the already popular Balamory, the show revolved around McCarry's character working as a nanny who educates children as to what parents may be doing during the workday. The character of Granny Murray provides a kernel of wisdom in each episode that "saves the day" for one of the parents off at work.

McCarry also starred in Rab C Nesbitt, playing Andra's wife in the series eight episode, "Bug" and a nurse in the series 4 episode "Buckfast".

McCarry worked as an actor with the Baldy Bane Theatre Co Glasgow. She appears occasionally in plays at the Edinburgh Festival Theatre.

McCarry taught drama at Shawlands Academy and St Pauls High School (Pollok) for three years. She also used to teach at St Andrews RC Secondary School in Glasgow's East End as well as Glasgow Gaelic School.

In 2012, Jane appeared in The Steamie at the King's Theatre, Glasgow.

McCarry joined the rest of the cast of the multi BAFTA Scotland award-winning Still Game in 2014 at the comeback live show at the SSE Hydro in Glasgow. There were 21 performances of the sell-out show.

In 2016, she reprised her role of Isa in the new series of Still Game, recommissioned by the BBC after the stage show's success.

In 2018, McCarry appeared in Nativity! The Musical while it toured to The Kings Theatre, Glasgow.

Since January 2026, Jane has co-presented the STV Radio show Micky and McCarry, alongside Micky Gavin on Saturdays.

== Early and personal life ==
McCarry is an only child and was raised in the King's Park area of south Glasgow. She has two children (Iain and Alexander) with her former husband, Robert Gibson who is from nearby Rutherglen; she has stated that she based aspects of her Isa character upon observations of the town's residents going about their lives.

== Filmography ==
Year	Title	Role	Notes
1994	The Tales of Para Handy	Flora	Episode: "A Night Alarm"
1994–2014	Rab C. Nesbitt	Sergeant Heenan / Nurse / Babette	4 episodes
1995–1996	Pulp Video	Various	
1997	The Baldy Man	Nurse	2 episodes
1998–2001	Hububb	Various	7 episodes
2002–2007, 2016–2019	Still Game	Isa Drennan	
2006–2008	Me Too!	Granny Murray	
2020	Nothing to Declare	Anne	2 episodes
2022	The Devil's Hour	Bella Holness	
2022	Too Rough	Anne	
2026–present	Micky and McCarry	Co-presenter	Radio show
