= James Martin (Scottish actor) =

Scottish film and television actor (1931–2025)

James Martin BEM
- Born: 13 March 1931; Partick, Glasgow, Scotland
- Died: 18 February 2025 (aged 93); Edinburgh, Scotland
- Occupation: Actor
- Years active: 1967, 1972–2018
- Known for: Still Game (2002–2019)

James Rooney Martin BEM (13 March 1931 – 18 February 2025) was a Scottish film and television actor. He is best known for playing Eric in the sitcom Still Game, in which he was one of the few actors who was actually an old age pensioner. Prior to acting, Martin served in the Royal Navy from 1949 until 1956 before joining the Royal Navy Reserves.

== Life and career ==
=== Early life ===
Born in Partick in Glasgow, for many years Martin lived in Musselburgh, East Lothian. Before working on Still Game, he was a helper working at Campie Primary School's after-school club in the town.

=== Royal Navy ===
Martin joined the Royal Navy in 1949 when he was 17 years old. He served in the Navy for seven years, after which he joined the Royal Navy Reserves in which he spent five years. Martin stated he "loved every second" of his Royal Navy career, stating it to be " the best thing I ever did in my life". He further added that he "was born right in Glasgow dock land, and had to leave school at 14". During his Navy career, he spent over two years in the Mediterranean Sea, based at Malta. Following the 1953 Ionian earthquake, Martin and other Royal Navy personnel assisted with rescue and recovery efforts. Martin had served on the HMS Bermuda at a point of his Navy career.

=== Acting career ===
Whilst working as a firefighter in the fire service, Martin had a lot of free time due to the nature of his shift rota. During his career in the fire service, Martin met Freddie Young who worked at the Young Casting Agency in Glasgow, and poised the idea to Martin to begin work in television. His acting career began by "walk on" jobs which lasted roughly eighteen months before he began to be offered lines to say during television productions. During that same period, Young secured Martin the position of assistant stage manager at a theatre. Following suggestions from others that he turn to acting full–time, Martin resigned as a firefighter and began studying dramatic art and related studies course at Telford College.

His professional acting career began in 1982 following his casting as a minister in the television series Maggie. He subsequently appeared in other successful television productions such as Taggart and Take the High Road. During his time working on the series Barmy Aunt Boomerang, Martin met with Michael Hines who was working on a new Scottish sitcom. Martin was offered the role of "Auld Eric" in the sitcom which became known as Still Game, a role he played during both inceptions of the show, first from 2002 until 2007, and again from 2016 until 2019.

Martin appeared in at least seven other television productions and five films. He also co-starred (with Jane Nelson Peebles, Anita Vettesse, Iain Wotherspoon, and Alan McHugh) in the 2009 short films Relatively PC and Relative Confusion, part of a sitcom series by the Inclusive Digital Economy Network teaching the importance of inclusive HCI, produced by University of Dundee Prof. Emeritus Alan F. Newell and directed by David Goodall. In 2014 he made a short appearance in episode 1x02 of Lovesick playing the main character's neighbour. He also appeared in Peter McDougall's Just Another Saturday (1975) under the name of Jimmy Martin.

=== Awards and recognition ===
Martin was awarded the British Empire Medal (BEM) in the 2024 Birthday Honours for services to Military Veterans and to charity.

== Death ==
Martin died on 18 February 2025, at the age of 93. He died at the Erskine Edinburgh Retirement Home in the city of Edinburgh, and is survived by his wife Christine, daughter Jennifer and granddaughters Laura and Elaine. His funeral occurred on 7 March 2025 at Mortonhall Crematorium and was attended by his Still Game co–stars, members of The Royal Navy Association and staff from the Erskine Edinburgh Retirement Home. His coffin was draped in the Royal Navy white ensign flag.

== Filmography ==
Year	Title	Role	Notes
1982	Maggie	Minister	
1983	Skorpion	Fraser	
1983	King's Royal	Distillery foreman	
1985	Why Do They Call It Good Friday?	Workman	
1988	Taggart	Steve Gooch	
1989	The Justice Game	Clerk of Court	
1990	Taggart	Gas Worker	
1991	The Advocates	Office runner	
1991	Bunch of Fives	Priest	
1995	Doctor Finlay	Mr. McNeal	
1996	Screen One	Sheriff	
1999–2000	Barmy Aunt Boomerang	Grandpa	
2000	Donovan Quick	Elderly man	
2001	Monarch of the Glen	Robbie	
2002	Living in Hope	Sickie	
2002	Taggart	Paul	
2002–2019	Still Game	Eric	Series regular 47 episodes
2003	Solid Air	Todd	
2008	Taggart	Billy Watson	
2010	How Not to Live Your Life	Charity Shop worker	
2011	Rab C. Nesbitt	Jackie	
2014	Lovesick	Neighbour	
