= Paul Riley (actor) =

Scottish actor (born 1970)

- Born: Paul William Riley; 17 January 1970 (age 56); Glasgow, Scotland
- Occupations: Actor and comedian
- Years active: 1990–present
- Known for: Chewin' the Fat (1999–2005); Still Game (2002–2019); Dear Green Place (2007–2008)
- Awards: BAFTA for role as Winston Ingram in Still Game (Nov. 2006); "Best Entertainment" BAFTA for Dear Green Place (Nov. 2006)

Paul William Riley (born 17 January 1970) is a Scottish actor and comedian. He is best known for his role as Winston Ingram in the sitcom, Still Game.

== Life and career ==
He grew up in a housing estate in northern Glasgow. His father was a shipyard worker and his mother worked at the Tennent Caledonian brewery. He worked initially as stage crew at the Pavilion Theatre in Glasgow before becoming attending the Royal Scottish Academy of Music and Drama and becoming an actor. He had a minor role in an episode of Taggart.

Riley worked on Chewin' the Fat, the sketch show from which Still Game was spun-off. Riley also starred in, wrote and directed Dear Green Place, again with Ford Kiernan from Still Game. From 2002 to 2019, he played the character Winston Ingram, a pensioner in the long-running BBC comedy sitcom Still Game.

In 2023, he performed a personal show 'Auld Before my Time' at some UK entertainment venues.

Between 2024 and 2026, Riley performed another two personal shows at UK theatres entitled respectively 'The Little Boy That Santa Forgot' and 'Too Smart To Be Nice'.

== Awards and recognition ==
On 1 November 2006, it was announced that Riley had been nominated for a BAFTA Scotland award for his role in Still Game. He was up against Barry Jones and Stuart McLeod in their show, Tricks from the Bible. On 12 November, Riley won the award, also picking up the "Best Entertainment" category as well for Dear Green Place.

In 2025, Riley as Winston from Still Game was represented in a public art mural in Glasgow.
