= Gavin Mitchell (actor) =

Scottish actor and comedian

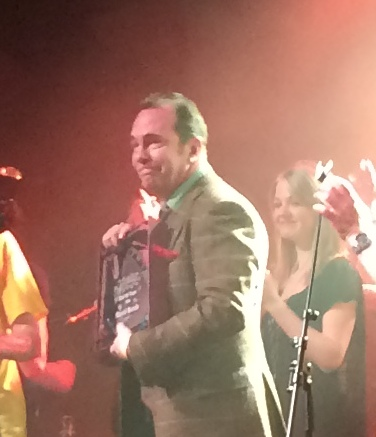
- Mitchell in 2016
- Born: 16 December 1964 (age 61); Glasgow, Scotland
- Occupations: Actor, comedian
- Years active: 1993–present
- Known for: Still Game (2002–2007, 2016-2019)

Gavin Mitchell (born 16 December 1964) is a Scottish actor and comedian, best known for playing Boaby, the barman, in the sitcom Still Game.

== Life and career ==
Mitchell first became an actor in 1990 after gaining an equity card.

Mitchell had a recurring role as Callum McIntyre in the drama series Monarch of the Glen, played various roles in sketch show Velvet Soup, and has appeared in sitcoms Empty, Happy Hollidays and You Instead. He played a recurring character in crime drama The Field of Blood. He appeared in two episodes of series 7 of the children's adventure series M.I. High, in which he also voiced The Mastermind, taking over from Brian Cox.

He starred as Boaby the barman in the long-running Scottish BBC sitcom Still Game between 2002 and 2019.

In 2019, he performed as Grand Duke Sergei Alexandrovich of Russia in the Netflix TV documentary The Last Czars. In the same year he won 'Best Actor' at 'The Scottish Comedy Awards' and was awarded an honorary Doctor of Letters by Glasgow Caledonian University.

In 2024, he played the character Andy Malvin in the BBC drama Nightsleeper.

Between 2024 and 2025 he starred in a personal theatre show 'Look Who It Isnae' which toured theatres and public halls in Scotland.

On stage, Mitchell has played the male lead in Casablanca: The Gin Joint Cut, a spoof of the Humphrey Bogart film Casablanca, which has appeared at the Edinburgh Fringe. He toured Britain, Paris and Barbados.

He has also appeared as the owner of a waste management company in the new series of Shetland (Series 11)on the BBC

== Personal life ==
Mitchell is a fan of David Bowie: in March 2016 he accepted Bowie's posthumous induction into Glasgow's Barrowland Hall of Fame.

In 2025, he was admitted to Glasgow Royal Infirmary after a severe choking accident but recovered.
