= Ned (Scottish) =

Derogatory term for petty criminals

Ned is a Scottish term for ruffian or hooligan, akin to the word yob.

== Early use of term ==
The Oxford Living Dictionaries dates the term to the early 19th century, and similar use of the shortened form of Edward may have been popularised by the notoriety of Ned Kelly. Examples are plentiful through the 20th century. Former Chief Constable of Glasgow Sir Percy Sillitoe noted use of the word by gangs and police in the 1930s. Leader columns of newspapers in the 1960s featured the term in relation to teenage gang violence. In a 1962 book, the crime writer and broadcaster Bill Knox referred to stolen cars turning up after having been taken "by a bunch of neds who want transport for some house-breaking job". He publicised the term more widely in his 1970s police report series Crimedesk, made and broadcast by STV. In his 1975 novel Rally to Kill, Knox described "neds" as Glasgow's "tag for small-time hoodlums", saying that "neds" and their families from the Gorbals had been rehoused elsewhere in the city, "taking their violence with them to the new areas". A 1982 analysis of crime fiction notes Knox's 1977 novel Pilot Error describing Strathclyde Police as being unconcerned about "neds" getting hurt in a fight as long as no one else is affected and translates the term as "Glasgow slang for hoods".

In his 2002 autobiography Granny Made Me an Anarchist, the Glaswegian writer Stuart Christie described the Glasgow "Neds" as preceding the Teddy Boys of 1955 as a hangover from the poverty of the 1930s. These "Neds" had long hair parted in the middle and smoothed down with liquid paraffin, commonly with a "dowp" tucked behind their ear as a fire hazard, which in urban legend had resulted in one "Ned" getting severe burns. He describes them as slouching along with their elbows projecting aggressively, wearing a white silk scarf tucked into their tightly buttoned jacket, and carrying a cut-throat razor in its breast pocket. Over this, on outings for a fight or a dance, they allegedly wore an old tweed overcoat with weapons such as hatchets or hammers concealed in the lining. According to Christie, the "Teds" who followed them also had a reputation for wild behaviour, but were too concerned about their clothes to engage in aggression.

== Ned culture ==
In 2003, the Scottish Socialist Party MSP Rosie Kane tabled a question to the Scottish Parliament condemning use of the word "ned" which she said was degrading and insulting to young people as it stood for "non-educated delinquent". This is a widespread folk etymology, but appears to be a backronym arising long after the term came into use. The English-made alcoholic drink Buckfast is very popular in Scotland and often associated with ned culture.

A 2011 study using ethnography as a methodology of linguistic research found working-class adolescent males in a high school in the south side of Glasgow deploying a number of distinct social identities:

- those identified as "neds" by themselves and others
- "alternatives" (sometimes called "Goths" or "Moshers") who enjoyed rock music and wore black clothes
- "sports" who enjoyed football and rugby and wore trainers and sports clothing
- "schoolies" who generally did not play sports but played musical instruments.

Many pupils in the study distanced themselves from the stereotypes. Each group had a characteristic way of speaking and used this to create social identity. Those in the "ned" category, for example, lowered tones in words such as "cat" and extended the vowels. This in itself was insufficient to identify someone as being a "ned": consideration of clothing and social activities was also needed. Both the "neds" and the "sports" had an attitude of enjoying engaging in physical violence while the "schoolies" avoided violence, but antisocial behaviour was often only carried out by a small minority of adolescents. The "neds" were just as concerned about violence and crime as the other groups, but, unlike them, socialised in the street rather than being engaged in the school culture.

In Dundee, the Roma word gadgie (a non-Roma man) has been used historically; however, ned has been introduced by popular culture. In all other parts of Scotland and in parts of northeast England (particularly Newcastle upon Tyne), gadgie remains current with its Roma meaning.

British psychologist Adrian Raine has expressed contempt for what he feels is the glorification of ned culture in the Scottish media. He has also opined that ned culture is closely correlated with psychopathy.

By 2006, the term chav from the South of England was used across the United Kingdom with ned often seen as the synonymous Scottish term. Other local terms are "schemies" in Edinburgh and "scallies" in Liverpool.

== In popular culture ==
Neds became a staple of Scottish comedy and neddish characters feature in sketch shows such as Chewin' the Fat, Limmy's Show and Burnistoun, and sitcom Still Game. Scottish soap opera River City has featured neds such as Shellsuit Bob. Neds is a 2010 film by director Peter Mullan. A 2020 Graeme Armstrong novel, The Young Team, set in Airdrie, North Lanarkshire a few miles east of Glasgow and narrated by a gang member in the local dialect, focuses on the 'ned culture' of the region in the early 21st century.

== See also ==
- Chav
- Dres
- Flaite
- Football casuals
- Glasgow gangs
- Gopnik
- Skeet (Newfoundland)
- Suedehead
