= Chewin' the Fat =

Scottish television series

- Series title card (1999–2002)
- Created by: Ford Kiernan; Greg Hemphill
- Written by: Ford Kiernan; Greg Hemphill
- Directed by: Brian Horsburgh; Michael Hines; Colin Gilbert
- Starring: Ford Kiernan; Greg Hemphill; Karen Dunbar; Paul Riley; Mark Cox
- Composer: Dave Murricane
- Country of origin: Scotland
- Original languages: Scots; English
- No. of series: 4
- No. of episodes: 30

Production
- Production locations: Glasgow and Dunbartonshire, Scotland
- Running time: 30 minutes
- Production companies: The Comedy Unit; Effingee Productions; BBC Scotland

Original release
- Network: BBC One
- Release: 13 January 1999 – 31 December 2005

Related
- Still Game (2002–2007, 2016–2019); The Karen Dunbar Show (2003–2006)

Chewin' the Fat is a Scottish comedy sketch show created by Ford Kiernan and Greg Hemphill and produced by Effingee Productions and the Comedy Unit for BBC Scotland. Kiernan and Hemphill also star alongside Karen Dunbar, Paul Riley and Mark Cox.

Chewin' the Fat began as a radio series on BBC Radio Scotland. The later television show, which ran for four series, was first broadcast on BBC One. Though the final series ended in February 2002, a Hogmanay special was broadcast every New Year's Eve between 2000 and 2005. Kiernan and Hemphill later adapted two of their Chewin' the Fat characters, Jack and Victor, into the acclaimed sitcom Still Game.

The series' name derives from the idiom "to chew the fat", meaning to chat casually but thoroughly about subjects of mutual interest.

== Recurring characters and sketches ==
Alistair and Rory
Two eccentric documentary presenters from the Scottish Highlands, fascinated with Scottish history and landscapes who are constantly harassed by two neds. The characters are partly based on the hosts of Scottish history programmes, such as Tom Weir.
The Big Man
A tough Glaswegian gangster and a stereotypical representation of an "alpha male", who endeavours to solve people's problems by means of intense intimidation and violence. Frequently hypocritical, he usually demands whatever he had helped his clients receive as payment.
Tony and Wullie / Bish and Bosh
Two questionable painters and decorators who often steal from the houses they work. They are normally seen having a tea break, discussing something trivial that Wullie eventually takes "too far" according to Tony.
James and Gary / the Banter Boys
Two camp men and self-confessed fans of "Glasgow banter" who are regularly found nearby places where it is common.
Big Jock
An overbearing, narcissistic golfer who enjoys humiliating his fellow golf club members.
Duncan and Malcolm / the Lighthouse Keepers
Two Highlanders who work in a lighthouse on the fictional west coast island of Aonoch Mor. Duncan endures Malcolm's humour, ranging from practical jokes to dark comedy; to which the former's response is always "Gonnae no dae that?"
The Lonely Shopkeeper
A bored, friendless woman seemingly working endlessly in a corner shop.
Fiona the Depressed Taxi Controller
An extremely unlucky woman working as a taxi controller, who is always shown crying down her headset to the drivers about her terrible life, and how her new boyfriends repeatedly die in bizarre circumstances.
Jack and Victor
Two mischievous Glaswegian pensioners. Kiernan and Hemphill portray the two and later adapted them into the protagonists of the sitcom Still Game.
The Janny
A school janitor who pops up to try and fix anything and everything.
Stephen, the boy who has just started masturbating
A 14-year-old boy called Stephen (Note: Played by Gordon McCorkell) who is constantly embarrassed by his parents as they announce proudly, to anyone they meet, that he has just started masturbating. While others of his age find this hilarious, many of the adults react by smiling and congratulating Stephen.
Betty the Auld Slapper
A female pensioner, usually seen giving interviews to a "teatime radio show" about her (often sexual) memories from during the Second World War.
The Community Mobile Van
A van that brings various cultural amenities to the car park of a council estate, including, bizarrely, swimming pools, art galleries and theatres.
Miss Isabelle Gourlay
A highly-strung, seemingly sexually repressed teacher who gets overly offended by just about anything her class says, who take pleasure in winding her up as a result.
Ballistic Bob
A man who enters a destructive rage after failing to do temperamental tasks.
The Nightshifters
Two men who try to get some sleep for their night shift, but are always interrupted by too much noise; subsequently seeking the source of it.
Gretta
An outgoing female boss who hangs around two reluctant male employees at their desks whilst being obsessed with her moustache.
Sluich
Two mischievous sock puppets from the Scottish Highlands, who speak gibberish that is supposed to sound like Gaelic with English loan words. It is a parody of the Gaelic-language children's programme Dòtaman.
Mr. Simpson
A man with a whistling lisp, which is often mocked via others having him speak phrases with the pronunciation of the letter "S" strewn throughout; for instance, his niece and nephew have him read The Night Before Christmas from the beginning.
The Smoking Family
A family of chain smokers who only spend their money on their incredibly heavy addiction to cigarettes. They have all lost their voices due to throat cancer, so they have to rely on voice boxes to communicate.
The Sewer Workers
Two sewer workers who find strange ways of amusing themselves in the sewer, including playing with faeces.
Ronald Villiers
An extremely poor actor with a gravelly, monotonous voice, Ronald is apparently registered with the agent "Widdecombe & Pump." When presented with any script or concept, he invariably responds "Ah can dae that" but is incapable of remembering simple lines, often completely misunderstands the directions of the director, and attempts inappropriate ad-libs. When cast as a background artist, he will invariably interrupt the flow of the scene and speak when not required.
Gym Teacher
A flatulent gym teacher who demonstrates physical activity to his class and ends up passing gas from exertion.
The Sniffer
A woman who can smell "shite", often in the form of a scam or a lie, from a distance away. According to her mail, her name is Olive Actory, a play on olfactory.
The Shoe Sniffer
A man with an extreme fetish for sniffing other people's shoes; usually distracting the person and then doing so in a surreptitious manner.
Bob and Alan
Two overbearing salesmen in an electronics store who frequently try to put their "sales pitch" on expecting customers.
Socially awkward car salesman
A car salesman (Note: Played by Mark Cox) who stands in a group with three other car salesmen (Note: Played by Kiernan, Hemphill, and Paul Riley) that have a laugh with each other by making comments or noises in relation to a subject. When it gets to his turn, he becomes overbearing by making loud noises or gestures, resulting in the other salesmen walking away in embarrassment.
Milk Lemonade Chocolate
Different characters in competitive, or disagreeing situations, who proceed to taunt the losing side by chanting "Milk Lemonade Chocolate", pointing to their breasts, crotch, and posteriors respectively.
Oooh, fancy!
A sketch featuring a different group of people each time. The group compares items; whoever has a notably different or posher item to the rest is met with the taunt "Oooh, fancy!"
Eric the Activist
A deranged animal rights activist who behaves towards people as if they were animals, such as grabbing a man's lip when he is fishing to demonstrate "what it feels like".
Harry, Linda and George
Harry often becomes unjustifiably angry and verbally abusive to his long-suffering wife, Linda, even if she makes the simplest of mistakes,; such as during a game of Monopoly or Countdown. George, a family friend with a soft spot for Linda, always gets caught in the middle of these arguments while trying to stop them. Linda and George always have the last laugh, however, as Harry usually faces the consequences.
Tom Gallagher
A Glasgow merchant who sets up stalls around Glasgow in an attempt to sell sports socks at the price of "two for a pound".
Brenda
A woman who repeatedly seriously injures her husband before shouting "Help, help, there's been a terrible accident!" in a very bored, insincere manner.
Rab McGlinchy
A stereotypical shellsuit-wearing, chain-smoking, hard-drinking Glaswegian ned who is employed by a television company to translate the Scottish news, originally narrated by a newsreader, into the ned dialect.
Singing Bar Boys
Many old men, including Jack and Victor, who sing songs, changing the lyrics for comedic effect. Some of these characters later appeared in Still Game.
Foul-mouthed Fishermen
Two fishermen aboard the trawler named the Pearl Necklace. They speak in a nautical tone, but their words have little to do with ships, tending to make references to sex or various parts of the anatomy.
The wee girl with the scooter
Characters are hit (sometimes even killed) by an unseen vehicle; after turning around, they are faced with a smiling young girl on a scooter, accompanied by some ice cream van music.
Derek's wife
A gullible woman seen on the phone to her mother recounting how great her unseen husband Derek is, completely unaware that he seems to be a self-serving liar and cheat.
"Wank, Good Guy"
Various characters in different situations describing other people (and things) as either a "wank" or a "good guy", including ducks in a pond, gingerbread men, fish, and soldiers at the Changing of the Guard being described as either by Prince Philip.
Jeremy Black
A news reporter who covers various bizarre court cases, such as a fight at a science fiction convention and a woman who assaults a court sketch artist. He always speaks in a professional manner except when quoting defendants, which usually involves Scottish slang or threats.
Richard
The English host of a home shopping channel, QSC (a parody of QVC). He is constantly antagonised through an earpiece by his producer, who tries to force him to eat disgusting food from a Christmas hamper, taunts him about a co-worker who earns more money than him, or makes fun of his appearance.
"Taysiders in Space"
A parody of Star Trek featuring a crew with Dundee accents aboard the spaceship Aurora, from the Starfleet Academy in Carnoustie.

== Cast & crew ==
=== Main cast ===
- Ford Kiernan (Note: Characters played by Kiernan include Rory, the Big Man, Tony, Gary, Malcolm, Jack McAlpine, the Janny, Big Jock, Ballistic Bob, Mr. Simpson, Ronald Villiers, Alan, Harry, Rab McGlinchy, Richard and O'Donnell;; amongst others)
- Greg Hemphill (Note: Characters played by Hemphill include Alistair, Wullie, James, Duncan, Victor McDade, the gym teacher, Bob, Eric the activist, George, Tom Gallagher, Jeremy Black and Captain McConnell; amongst others)
- Karen Dunbar (Note: Characters played by Dunbar include the Lonely Shopkeeper, Depressed Taxi Caller, Betty the Auld Slapper, Miss Isabelle Gourlay, Gretta, the Sniffer, Linda, Brenda and Derek's Wife; amongst others)
- Paul Riley
- Mark Cox
- Julie Wilson Nimmo
- Tom Urie
- Gordon McCorkell

=== Crew ===
- Ford Kiernan and Greg Hemphill - writers and co-creators
- Michael Hines – director
- Colin Gilbert – producer
- Ewan Angus – producer for BBC Scotland
- Rab Christie – script editor
- John McNeil – lighting director

==== Additional material ====
- Sanjeev Kohli
- Donald McLeary
- Iain Connell
- Robert Florence

== Episodes ==
=== Series 1 (1999) ===
- Episode 1 – 13 January 1999
- Episode 2 – 20 January 1999
- Episode 3 – 27 January 1999
- Episode 4 – 3 February 1999
- Episode 5 – 10 February 1999
- Episode 6 – 17 February 1999

=== Series 2 (1999) ===
- Episode 1 – 11 November 1999
- Episode 2 – 18 November 1999
- Episode 3 – 25 November 1999
- Episode 4 – 2 December 1999
- Episode 5 – 9 December 1999
- Episode 6 – 16 December 1999

=== Series 3 (2001) ===
- Episode 1 – 2 February 2001
- Episode 2 – 9 February 2001
- Episode 3 – 16 February 2001
- Episode 4 – 23 February 2001
- Episode 5 – 2 March 2001
- Episode 6 – 9 March 2001

=== Series 4 (2002) ===
- Episode 1 – 18 January 2002
- Episode 2 – 25 January 2002
- Episode 3 – 1 February 2002
- Episode 4 – 8 February 2002
- Episode 5 – 15 February 2002
- Episode 6 – 22 February 2002

=== Specials ===
- 2000 Hogmanay Special – 31 December 2000
- 2001 Hogmanay Special – 31 December 2001
- 2002 Hogmanay Special – 31 December 2002
- 2003 Hogmanay Special – 31 December 2003
- 2004 Hogmanay Special – 31 December 2004
- 2005 Hogmanay Special – 31 December 2005

== DVD releases ==
DVD title	Release date	Content
Series 1	19 March 2001	Series 1 Episodes 1–6
Series 2	17 July 2000	Series 2 Episodes 1–6
Series 3	9 April 2001	Series 3 Episodes 1–6
Series 4	5 August 2002	Series 4 Episodes 1–6
Series 1–3 boxset	1 November 2001	Series 1–3, The Live Show and Still Game Live
Series 1–4 boxset	23 February 2004	Series 1–4
Hogmanay 2000	2001	The Hogmanay 2000 Special with 30 minutes of unseen footage
The Live Show	27 November 2000	The Live Show
The Best of	20 November 2006	A selection of some of the best sketches
