= Jake D'Arcy =

Scottish actor (1945–2015)

- Born: 20 July 1945; Chichester, West Sussex, England
- Died: 28 May 2015 (aged 69); Glasgow, Scotland
- Occupation: Actor

John Paterson Sinclair (20 July 1945 – 28 May 2015), better known as Jake D'Arcy, was a Scottish actor. He appeared in a number of television series, including as "Pete the Jakey" in the comedy programme Still Game from 2002 until 2007, and as 'Fud' O'Donnell in the 1987 Tutti Frutti. In films he played Coach Phil Menzies in Gregory's Girl (1981).

== Theatre ==
Year	Title	Role	Company	Director	Notes
1990	The Ship	Bob	The Ship's Company, Govan	Bill Bryden	play by Bill Bryden staged at Harland and Wolff, Govan

== Television and film ==
Starting in the early 1970s, D'Arcy had roles in films and television, appearing in such TV dramas and films as Dr. Finlay's Casebook, Minder, Tutti Frutti, Rab C. Nesbitt, Takin' Over the Asylum, Hamish Macbeth, Taggart and Still Game. He appeared in the 2009 Christmas special of British comedy show Outnumbered.

D'Arcy also had a brief guest appearance as Archie Gordon, the Father of the Samantha Womack character Antonia "Toni" Gordon in the popular CITV show Spatz in 1990. (Series 1, Episode 2).

In 2014, he played Smokey in the film What We Did on Our Holiday.

== Death ==
D'Arcy died in Glasgow on 28 May 2015, at the age of 69.

== Filmography ==
Year	Title	Role	Notes
1975	Five Red Herrings	Hammond	Lord Peter Wimsey (TV series), 3 episodes
1981	A Sense of Freedom	Robbie	
1981	Gregory's Girl	Coach Phil Menzies	
1986	Heavenly Pursuits	Wee Man in Bar	
1994	Chasing the Deer	Tam	
1994	Staggered	Pilot	
1996	The Bruce	Chief MacKenzie	
2000	The Little Vampire	Farmer McClaughlin	
2000	Beautiful Creatures	Train Guard	
2014	What We Did on Our Holiday	Smokey	
