= Still Game =

Scottish sitcom (2002–2019)

- Genre: Sitcom
- Created by: Ford Kiernan; Greg Hemphill
- Developed by: Ford Kiernan; Greg Hemphill
- Directed by: Michael Hines
- Starring: Ford Kiernan; Greg Hemphill; Paul Riley; Jane McCarry; Mark Cox; Sanjeev Kohli; Gavin Mitchell; James Martin
- Theme music composer: Frank Chacksfield and the Cuban Boys (2002–2007); BBC Scottish Symphony Orchestra (2016–2019)
- Country of origin: Scotland
- Original languages: Scots; English
- No. of series: 9
- No. of episodes: 62 (list of episodes)

Production
- Executive producers: Ford Kiernan; Greg Hemphill; Steven Canny
- Producers: Colin Gilbert; Michael Hines; Ewan Angus; Jacqueline Sinclair
- Production location: Glasgow and the West of Scotland
- Camera setup: Multi-camera
- Running time: 30 minutes
- Production companies: The Comedy Unit; Effingee Productions; BBC Scotland; BBC Studios Comedy Productions

Original release
- Network: BBC One Scotland (2002–2004, 2006–2007); BBC Two (2005–2008); BBC One (2005, 2016–2019); BBC Scotland (2019)
- Release: 6 September 2002 – 31 December 2007
- Release: 7 October 2016 – 28 March 2019

Related
- Chewin' the Fat

Still Game is a Scottish sitcom created by Ford Kiernan and Greg Hemphill and produced by Effingee Productions, the Comedy Unit and BBC Scotland. Kiernan and Hemphill play the lead characters, Jack Jarvis, Esq and Victor McDade, two Glaswegian pensioners. The characters first appeared in the pair's previous TV sketch show Chewin' the Fat, which aired in Scotland for 6 years from January 1999 until December 2005.

Following its debut on 6 September 2002, 62 episodes of Still Game were aired, including Christmas and Hogmanay specials; in addition, numerous live performances were produced. The first three series were broadcast exclusively on BBC One Scotland, though five episodes selected from the first two series were later broadcast throughout the UK on BBC Two in January and February 2004. From the fourth series onwards, Still Game was broadcast across the UK on BBC Two.

After series six had aired in 2007, the production of Still Game ended due to Kiernan and Hemphill experiencing burnout; the Scottish press initially reported rumours that a feud between the two had occurred, but they have since denied this. They eventually returned to write and star in the seventh series, which debuted in October 2016 on BBC One. It was announced on 13 July 2018 that a ninth and final series would be produced, which would see the characters go into "comedy retirement". The final series premiered on 24 February 2019 as one of the first programmes to be broadcast on the brand new BBC Scotland channel.

Still Game was acclaimed by audiences and critics, and is considered a staple of Scottish television. In a 2020 poll, readers of The Scotsman voted Still Game as the best Scottish television programme of all time.

== History ==
The original stage play of Still Game (1997–1999)

Still Game started as a stage play featuring three characters: Jack Jarvis, Victor McDade, and Winston Ingram. Due to a broken lift, the three men are stuck in Victor's flat and discuss a variety of subjects ranging from death to sex. The stage play toured Scotland, England, Ireland and Canada before returning to Glasgow, where the show was filmed at the Cottiers Theatre in 1999 and released on video on 22 November 1999. A DVD of the show was later released on 2 December 2002. It is available on YouTube, as of January 2022. A small number of revisions accompanied Still Game's transition from stage to television. Gavin Mitchell, who originally played Winston (and was replaced by Paul Riley for later performances), played the part of Boabby in the series. Characters mentioned in passing were later fleshed out into supporting characters.

In 1998, Jack and Victor appeared in a number of skits in a tongue-in-cheek documentary about Scottish pop music called Och Around the Clock. In these, they are shown to be watching while sitting in Victor's flat. Their skits centred on the duo's disparaging comments about the performers. The characters reappeared in Kiernan and Hemphill's sketch show Chewin' the Fat, nearly every episode of which featured Jack, Victor, Tam and Winston, with minor differences from their counterparts in the series. By the time Still Game became a show in its own right Winston's physical appearance had changed significantly, but he was still played by Paul Riley. As the show evolved, supporting characters assumed greater prominence. Jack and Victor made their final appearance on Chewin' the Fat in the 2002 Hogmanay Special.

For the show's first three series, the broadcast of Still Game was limited to BBC One Scotland. The show was then moved to BBC Two for the fourth series and shown throughout the UK. On 28 December 2005, the first Christmas special was shown on BBC One, the first UK wide broadcast of the show on the channel. A fifth series of the show started filming in February 2006 and was shown the following June on BBC Two. As of 2006, series three had not been shown across the whole of the UK, and only five episodes from the first two series were shown on BBC Two from 17 January to 14 February 2004. The second series was shown UK wide from 10 July 2008. This meant it was listed as a new series in TV listings, even though it was not new for Scottish viewers. In the first three series, the episode titles were all Scots words that were related to the episode. Starting from series four, the episodes were titled using standard English, so that international audiences could understand them.

The events of Still Game take place in a floating timeline where the characters remain the same age from series to series. One of the most prominent examples of this is that Victor reveals that he is 74 years old in "Scran", an episode of the second series, but it is not until the fifth series ("Smoke on the Water") that he celebrates his 75th birthday. The sixth series of Still Game ended on BBC Two on 23 August 2007. A Christmas special was aired on BBC One Scotland on 23 December and for the rest of the UK on BBC Two on 28 December. There was also a Hogmanay special called "Hootenanny" aired on BBC One Scotland, later aired to the rest of the UK on 2 January 2008.

Ford Kiernan, Greg Hemphill and Paul Riley's company Effingee Productions is thought to have split up after Riley walked away to go it alone after being refused more control over the future of the company by Kiernan. Hemphill stated that he didn't want a "boardroom battle". The split ultimately resulted in the indefinite hiatus of the series. In 2012, Gary Miller acquired the rights to the original stage play of Still Game and, working with producer Kenny Boyle, the show toured, with a new cast, to The Tron theatre, FTH theatre, and The Ayr Gaiety Theatre. The original play had not been staged for 14 years. Kiernan and Hemphill came to see the performances and consequently began considering reviving Still Game officially.

On 15 October 2013, the Daily Record ran a front-page story that the show would be returning. On 23 October 2013, Ford Kiernan and Greg Hemphill announced details of live shows entitled Still Game Live at the SSE Hydro in Glasgow at a press conference. They were scheduled to perform four shows beginning in September 2014, but due to high demand, it was extended to 16 and then 21 shows. On 24 October 2013 Kiernan confirmed in the Daily Record that the tour of the original stage show had been one of the instigating factors for Still Game's return. The 21 shows at The Hydro ran from 19 September 2014 until 10 October 2014, played to 210,000 fans and made £6,000,000 in ticket sales. The show received mixed reviews. In November 2014, a special sketch featuring Jack and Victor visiting the set of River City was made for Children in Need. The sketch also featured a cameo of a director, played by Still Game director Michael Hines. On Hogmanay 2014, BBC Scotland showed a documentary celebrating the show titled Still Game: The Story So Far. The programme featured interviews with the cast, celebrities who have appeared on the show and super fans, including a look at some favourite moments.

On 12 May 2016, the BBC announced that the show would return in 2016 with a six-part seventh series, nine years after the previous series concluded. Filming of the new seventh series started in the summer; the series began airing on 7 October 2016. The show's return attracted its highest ever overnight audience for a single episode on 7 October, taking a 58% share of the Scottish TV audience with 1,300,000 viewers. The show also aired for the first time on BBC One across the UK nationwide and drew a total audience of 3,200,000. The show's floating timeline manifested itself in even more extreme ways than in the original run; for instance in the episode "The Undrinkables", it is revealed that the now-childless Tam and Frances are only celebrating their second wedding anniversary, while Fergie and Sinead have only been married a year in the episode "Small Change", despite the pair marrying in the fifth series episode "All the Best", a full ten years previously.

As an acknowledgement of his role in bringing about the revival, Hemphill and Keenan wrote the part of Walter Ingram, Winston's long lost brother, especially for Gary Miller. In September 2016, a second live show Still Game Live 2: Bon Voyage was announced for the SSE Hydro. The second stage show was to run for ten nights beginning 4 February 2017, but in October 2016, a further five performances were added. Unlike the previous live show, this show was not televised or recorded in any other way.

On 16 March 2017, it was announced that an eighth series has been commissioned to air on BBC One with plans to broadcast towards the end of 2017. The series was pushed back to start on 8 March 2018. Before the start of the eighth series, Hemphill revealed that he and Kiernan were about to start writing the ninth series and had planned a third and final live show afterward. On 13 July 2018, the BBC announced that Still Game would return for the ninth and final series later in 2019. Filming for the ninth series started in August 2018 and was completed on 14 September 2018. The third and final SSE Hydro live show Still Game: The Final Farewell was officially announced on 1 November 2018, with five shows in September 2019 taking place over three days. A further 5 shows were announced on 2 November.

In August 2024, it was announced Still Game would return as a comic book, with the first volume releasing in September.

In November 2026, it was announced that Still Game would be returning for a new live show titled ‘Still Game: Heaven Sent’. The show is set to have a 10-date run at the OVO Hydro in Glasgow from February 2028.

== Series and episodes ==
Series	Episodes	Originally released		
Series	Episodes	First released	Last released	Network
1	6	6 September 2002	11 October 2002	BBC One Scotland
2	6	28 March 2003	23 May 2003	BBC One Scotland
3	6	7 May 2004	11 June 2004	BBC One Scotland
4	6	22 July 2005	26 August 2005	BBC Two
Christmas Special		28 December 2005		BBC One
5	6	19 June 2006	24 July 2006	BBC Two
Hogmanay Special		31 December 2006		BBC One Scotland
6	6	12 July 2007	23 August 2007	BBC Two
Christmas Special		23 December 2007		BBC One Scotland
Hogmanay Special		31 December 2007		BBC One Scotland
7	6	7 October 2016	11 November 2016	BBC One
8	6	8 March 2018	12 April 2018	BBC One
9	9	24 February 2019	2 August 2019	BBC Scotland/BBC One

== Cast ==
=== Main cast ===
- Ford Kiernan as Jack Jarvis
- Greg Hemphill as Victor McDade
- Paul Riley as Winston Ingram
- Mark Cox as Thomas "Tam" Mullen
- Jane McCarry as Isa Drennan
- Sanjeev Kohli as Navid Harrid
- Gavin Mitchell as Robert "Boabby the Barman" Taylor

=== Recurring cast ===
- Shamshad Akhtar as Meena Harrid
- James Martin as Eric "Auld Eric" Jones
- Paul Young as Hugh "Shug" McLaughlin
- Jake D'Arcy as Peter "Pete the Jakey" McCormack
- Matt Costello as Stevie "The Bookie" Reid
- Lynne McCallum as Peggy McAlpine
- Sandy Nelson as Chris "The Postie" Armstrong
- Kate Donnelly as Frances Mullen
- Maureen Carr as Edith
- Jamie Quinn as Derek "Fergie the Ned" Ferguson
- Scott Reid as Michael "Methadone Mick" Doherty
- Marj Hogarth as Fiona Jarvis
- Mary Riggans as Sadie
- Bruce Morton as Ian Duncan Sheathing (and Doctor in previous episodes)

== Production ==
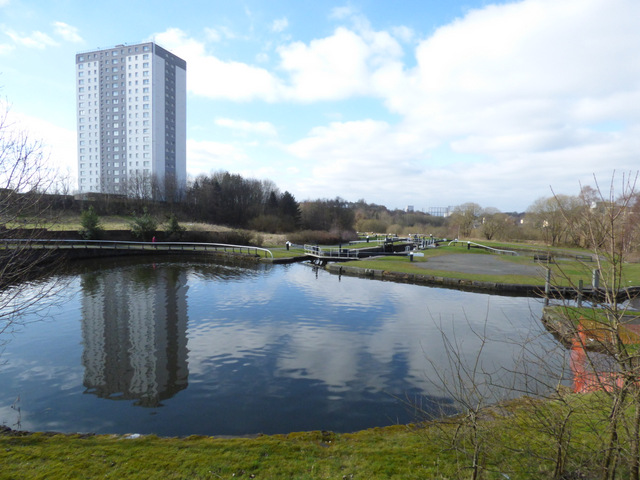
Maryhill features as Craiglang in Still Game. The tower block shown doubles as the fictitious Osprey Heights, the flats in which Jack and Victor reside

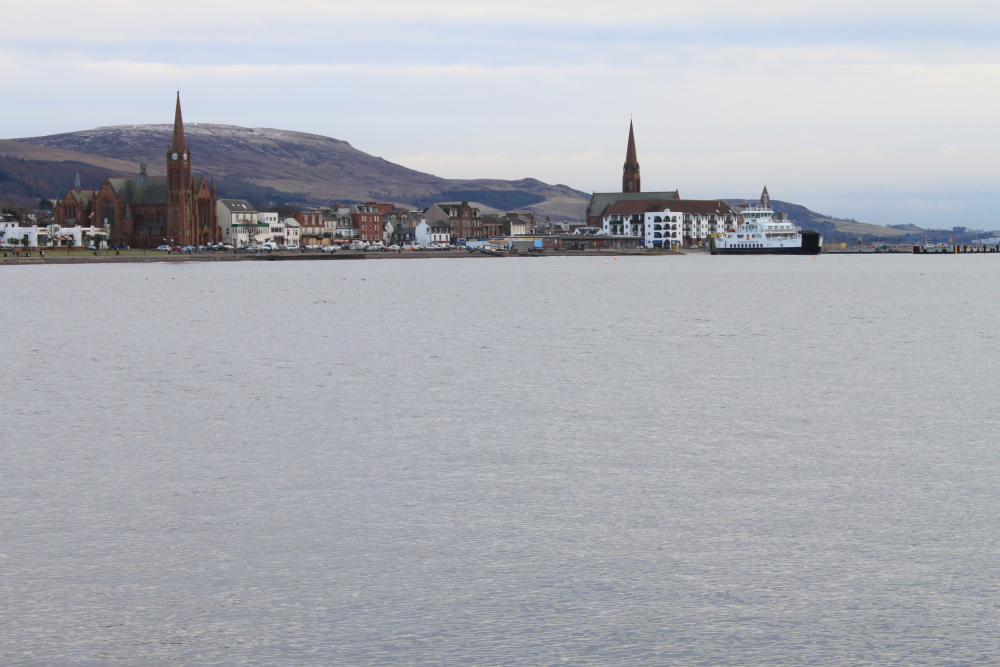
Largs in Ayrshire was one of two filming locations for the fictional seaside town of Finport

Still Game is set in the fictional Craiglang area of Glasgow, using the Maryhill district and other areas of the city as filming locations. In the series premiere, "Flittin", Jack resides in an unnamed area of Glasgow prior to moving in with Victor at Osprey Heights; these scenes were filmed in the Nitshill area of Glasgow. The block of flats that doubles as Osprey Heights is located at Collina Street in the Maryhill area of the city. The Forth and Clyde Canal and its locks are often seen in the background, along with the nearby high-rise tower blocks, including Collina Street. The shops featured in the series, including the exterior location of Harrid's, can be found near the centre of Glasgow in Townhead.

For the first three series, the Gimlet pub in Ruchill served as the exterior of the fictional Clansman pub. Between series three and four, the building was demolished; a reproduction exterior set was constructed by the production team in the Glasgow North Media Park, Maryhill for filming, beginning with the fourth series.

Scene interiors (Jack and Victor's flats, hallways, and the interior of Harrid's) were constructed sets in the warehouse of a complex, now a Maryhill industrial estate and part of Craigmont Studios. Navid's shop interior was a set built in Hillington Industrial Estate. Scenes from several episodes were also filmed in the Knightswood area, including exterior shots in the episode "Courtin" and the golf course scenes in the episode "Tappin".

An outdoor market in Possilpark was used in the episode "Cauld" where Winston buys several electric heaters. The bingo scene in "Courtin" was filmed at the Gala Bingo hall in Possilpark and was a scene that coincidentally brought two old friends together, as Paul Riley (Winston) and Joe Houston (the Gala Bingo caller featured in filming) were friends in their youth. The scenes where Jack and Victor visit Barbara at her workplace were filmed in Clydebank, a town eight miles west of Glasgow. The interior of the shop was also filmed on site in a local charity shop which is still in use today. Other locations near Glasgow double as the city, such as the interior of the bakery in the episode "Recipe" which was filmed in the Tunnocks factory and bakery in Uddingston, Lanarkshire. The courtroom scenes in the same episode were filmed in Court No. 2 of Hamilton Sheriff Court.

Certain episodes involve trips outside of Craiglang for the characters. For instance, the late eighteenth-century Ardgowan House at Inverkip, Inverclyde, was used as the setting for the fictional Blairtunnoch Estate in the episode "Fly Society". The bar seen in "Hootenanny" was the Red Hoose in Dunipace, Falkirk, chosen by producers for its "old world" qualities, fitting that of a pub in the Scottish Highlands. The fictional town of Finport, as seen in the fifth series episode "Saucy", was filmed on location in the Ayrshire towns of Largs and Saltcoats, both of which were once popular seaside resorts with Glaswegians. Real-life locations in Saltcoats seen in the episode include its promenade, sea wall and the Melbourne Café. In Largs, locations include the Royal Oak pub, while the bed and breakfast where Jack and Victor stay overnight is located at the north end of the town's promenade.

Just before the fifth series commenced filming, a pest control team had to be called into the Maryhill studio set when it was discovered that rats had infested Navid's shop and were eating their way through the stock. The alarm was raised after Jane McCarry discovered a dead rat on set. The high rat population in the area was due to the proximity of the Forth and Clyde Canal.

A 2014 crossover sketch for Children in Need with Scottish soap opera River City was filmed on the latter show's set, at the BBC Scotland studios in Dumbarton. The town's studios were often used in the production of the series' revival from 2016 to 2019.

== Theme music ==
The theme music used on the original TV broadcasts of the show is an excerpt from "Cuban Boy", as recorded by the Cuban Boys, which is itself based on a sample of Frank Chacksfield's track of the same name from the album West of Sunset. Alternate theme music is played before the Netflix and BBC iPlayer releases. For the seventh series onward, the BBC Scottish Symphony Orchestra recorded an updated version of the theme tune.

== Awards ==
Year	Group	Award	Result
2003	Celtic Media Awards	Best Entertainment Programme	Won
2004	Glenfiddich Spirit of Scotland	Most Popular Broadcast	Won
2004	BAFTA Scotland	Best Entertainment Programme	Won
2004	Rose d'Or	Best Sitcom	Nominated
2005	Celtic Media Awards	Best Entertainment Programme	Won
2005	BAFTA Scotland	Best Entertainment Programme	Won
2005	Rose d'Or	Best Sitcom	Nominated
2006	BAFTA Scotland	Best Entertainment Programme	Won
2007	BAFTA Scotland	Best Entertainment Programme	Nominated
2007	BAFTA Scotland	Best Actor: Sanjeev Kholi	Nominated
2007	BAFTA Scotland	Best Actress: Jane McCarry	Won
2007	BAFTA Scotland	TV Writing: Ford Kiernan & Greg Hemphill	Won
2007	BAFTA Scotland	Audience Award	Won
2008	BAFTA Scotland	Best Entertainment Programme	Nominated
2015	BAFTA Scotland	Best Entertainment Programme	Nominated
2015	Scottish Comedy Awards	Best TV Show	Won
2015	Scottish Comedy Awards	Best Event: Still Game Live	Won
2017	Scottish Comedy Awards	Best TV Show	Won
2017	BAFTA Scotland	Best Entertainment Programme	Nominated
2017	Celtic Media Awards	Best Comedy Show	Won
2018	National Television Awards	Best Comedy Programme	Nominated
2019	Scottish Comedy Awards	Best TV Show	Won

== DVD releases ==
DVD Title	Discs	No. of Ep.	DVD release	Notes
DVD Title	Discs	No. of Ep.	Region 2	Notes
Still Game Live at the Cottiers Theatre	1	1	2 December 2002	
Complete Series 1	1	6	3 July 2006	
Complete Series 2	2	9	3 July 2006	
Complete Series 3	1	6	17 July 2006	
Complete Series 4	1	6	17 July 2006	Includes behind the scenes footage
Complete Series 5	1	6	16 October 2006	
Complete Series 6	1	7	3 September 2007	
Complete Specials	1	4	3 November 2008	Includes the specials from 2005, 2006 & 2007
Complete Series 1–5	6	33	16 October 2006	
Complete Series 1–6	8	44	3 November 2008	Includes all of the specials
Still Game Live at the Hydro	1	1	24 November 2014	Includes over one hour not seen on TV
Complete Series 7	1	6	21 November 2016	
Complete Series 8	1	6	16 April 2018	
Complete Series 9	1	6	8 April 2019	
The Complete Collection	11	62	8 April 2019	Includes all of the specials

== Comic book adaptation ==
In August 2024, it was revealed the series would be brought back in comic book form. The first volume, titled He Who Hingeth Aboot Getteth HeeHaw!, released in September 2024, which was adapted from the first series. The second book, titled Hurdy Gurdy Gurdy in the Windae Boxes!, released on 31 October 2025. The third and final book, titled People Huv Tae Know!, released on 18 September 2026.

== Reception ==
Still Game has received acclaim from audiences and critics and is considered a cultural phenomenon in its native Scotland. Referring to the fifth series' finale, Scottish tabloid newspaper the Daily Record heralded for Still Game to be added to the ranks of the "greatest sitcoms ever". They called the episode "classic comedy" and said it was "a perfect mix of empathetic friendship, laugh-out-loud gags, real feeling in the acting and genuine warmth and chemistry between the characters". The Daily Record also reported that Still Game had higher ratings than rival comedies The Catherine Tate Show and Steve Coogan's Saxondale with 300,000 and 700,000 more viewers respectively. Creator and star Ford Kiernan said of the ratings: "I am absolutely delighted. The figures have gradually increased – episode after episode." TV Today praised the show for being "refreshing" in the age of dying sitcoms. It said the show was funny in a "straight down the line way". Ahead of its finale in 2019, Megan Wallace of The Guardian deemed it "Scotland's best-loved sitcom." The show has won awards in both the 2004 and 2005 BAFTA Scotland awards and was named as the winner in the Best Broadcast category at the 2004 Glenfiddich Spirit of Scotland Awards. In 2006, the show was once again nominated for a BAFTA Scotland award for the "Most Popular Television" category, beating contenders including Rebus and Taggart. Paul Riley, who plays Winston, was also awarded for his role in the show.

Still Game has attracted celebrity attention; in addition to many Scottish celebrities (including Robbie Coltrane, Sylvester McCoy, Lorraine Kelly, Amy Macdonald and Billy Boyd) making cameo appearances in the show, Foo Fighters frontman Dave Grohl and actors Sean Connery and Bill Nighy are reported to be fans. Nighy has even cited the programme as inspiration for his Scottish accent in the role of Davy Jones in the Pirates of the Caribbean film series.

However, the series has received criticism. It was criticised for its "reliance on expletives" by Teddy Jamieson, television critic for The Herald. He also commented that the sitcom "paints [Scotland] in broad strokes", through its use of stereotypes. The series revival from 2016 to 2019 was also met with some negative reviews; Julie McDowall, writing for The National, said of the first episode "You're going to hate me for saying this. I already hate myself for even daring to hold these thoughts, but I need to be honest with you: this was a disappointment." She later said of the series, "I fear this once brilliant sitcom is turning into Mrs. Brown's Boys. Just like an auld yin in The Clansman, its teeth have been removed and it's gumsy and ineffectual and a bit of a bore." A review in Chortle said "I suspect a lot of new viewers will wonder what all the fuss is about, as this episode seems clunky and dated," going on to say "in truth no one here appears to be a great actor" and that "it seems to be a little crudely edited, too, with the timing of cutaways off the pace. And when you start to notice things like that, it's got to be a sign that something's wrong."
