= Michael Hines =

English director and producer

Michael Hines is a television and film director based in Scotland. He has directed and produced Chewin' the Fat, a Scottish sketch show, and directed all 62 episodes of Still Game as well as hundreds of hours of television and short films including Instant Credit starring Billy Boyd. He was a committee member for BAFTA Scotland in 2017–18. In 2019 he was awarded an Outstanding Achievement Award from Bafta Scotland for his work on Still Game. His first feature film Man and Witch: The Dance of a Thousand Steps was released in the States in 2024 to acclaim.
