= 2003 in British television =

This is a list of British television-related events from 2003.

== Events ==
=== January ===
- 1 January – The Studio closes after nearly two years on the air.
- 2 January – BBC One airs Dot's Story, an EastEnders spin-off. It tells the story of Dot Branning's experiences as a wartime evacuee.
- 3 January – CITV celebrates its twentieth birthday with the CITV Birthday Bash.
- 4 January – ITV1 airs the first live edition of Blind Date, on which presenter Cilla Black announces she is quitting the show after 18 years. She later tells ITV bosses the programme should be shelved because of falling ratings which have dropped from 17 million at its peak to 4 million.
- 6 January
  - Scottish and Grampian adopt the ITV celebrity idents package, introduced on 28 October 2002, albeit with their own logos attached and with idents featuring a lot more Scottish personalities alongside those of ITV1.
  - Thomas & Friends makes a comeback on free-for-air television after a ten year absence, now airing Monday through Friday on CiTV.
- 11 January
  - Girls Aloud singer and former Popstars: The Rivals contestant Cheryl Tweedy is involved in an altercation with a nightclub toilet attendant, Sophie Amogbokpa, in The Drink nightclub in Guildford. She is subsequently charged with racially aggravated assault after allegedly calling Amogbokpa a "jigaboo" and assault occasioning actual bodily harm.
  - Debut of Channel 4's The Salon, a fly-on-the-wall series documenting events in a purpose-built beauty salon in London. The series airs for three months, before returning for a second run in October. It finishes in March 2004.
  - Steven Spielberg's science-fiction miniseries Taken debuts on BBC Two.
- 13 January
  - ITV1 soap Crossroads is relaunched under the stewardship of producer Yvon Grace and with a decidedly camp feel. However, Grace is criticised by fans for her ambivalence towards unresolved storylines from the 2001–2002 run.
  - Tracy Shaw makes her final appearance on Coronation Street as her character Maxine Peacock is brutally murdered by serial killer Richard Hillman.
- 15 January – Launch of Ftn and UK Bright Ideas.
- 28 January – Los Angeles-based police drama Boomtown debuts on Five.
- 31 January – The Campaign Week website reports that TBWA have used characters from the 1970s children's television show Hector's House for an ad campaign relaunching Virgin One bank account as The One account. The campaign has been created on behalf of the Royal Bank of Scotland which bought the name from Virgin and AMP in July 2001.

=== February ===
- 1 February
  - Postman Pat returns to CBeebies with a new series 6 years after the last series aired. The first episode is titled "Postman Pat and the Greendale Rocket": in the episode, The children set off on a school outing to the old Greendale Station and are very excited when they discover Greendale's old forgotten steam train, the Greendale Rocket. Everyone volunteers to get the station refurbished and back to operational condition. Pat and Ted try to get the engine working again with a new friend Ajay and his family.
  - BBC News airs coverage of The Space Shuttle Columbia explosion
- 3 February
  - The Martin Bashir documentary Living with Michael Jackson is broadcast on ITV1. The revelations of Jackson's controversial personal life in the programme is one of the many factors that leads to his trial for child molestation.
  - Launch of Channel U.
- 4 February – Channel 4 News airs an interview conducted by veteran politician Tony Benn with Iraqi President Saddam Hussein.
- 6 February – Prime Minister Tony Blair appears on BBC Two's Newsnight with Jeremy Paxman and a live audience where he is questioned about the Iraq crisis. Blair is taken aback when Paxman asks him about his Christian faith and whether he and US President George W. Bush have prayed together.
- 8 February – Phil Mitchell is to leave EastEnders later this year as Steve McFadden takes a break from the show.
- 9 February – After a long delay, BBC Choice is replaced by BBC Three. The opening night is simulcast on BBC Two.
- 9–10 February – ITV1 screens the controversial two-part drama The Second Coming, set around the return to Earth of Jesus Christ in modern-day Manchester.
- 10 February – During an interview on ITV's This Morning, Robin Gibb of the Bee Gees brands Graham Norton as scum after the comedian made a joke about the singer's late brother, Maurice on his Channel 4 chat show, V Graham Norton the day after his death.
- 12 February – In the weeks leading up to the Iraq War, the BBC screens a series of programmes examining the case for and against war. The centrepiece of this is Iraq Day: The Case For and Against War, a 90-minute programme on BBC One on that day. Presented by Peter Snow, the programme analyses the possible implications of a war in the Middle East and attempts to gauge public opinion on the subject with a viewers poll.
- 20 February – The 2003 BRIT Awards are held at London's Earls Court. Two of the acts, Ms. Dynamite and Coldplay, use their awards acceptance speeches to criticise plans for US-led military action in Iraq.
- 22 February – After an absence of six years, After Dark returns to television.
- 24 February
  - 19.4 million watch Coronation Street as Richard Hillman confesses to the murder of Maxine Peacock. the highest rated show of the year.
  - Mersey Television boss Phil Redmond criticises broadcasting watchdogs for forcing television to "dumb down" after the Independent Television Commission rules that episodes of Brookside that aired in November 2002 showing an armed siege had breached broadcasting regulations and were inappropriate for a pre-watershed audience.
- 26 February
  - BBC Two airs a special edition of TOTP2 featuring live performances from US rock band the Red Hot Chili Peppers.
  - ITV police drama series The Bill introduces a new theme tune and opening titles.

=== March ===
- 3 March – Five airs Take Two: The Footage You Were Never Meant to See, the "rebuttal video" issued in response to the Martin Bashir documentary Living with Michael Jackson. Having previously been aired on Sky One, this airing of the programme is watched by 2.4 million viewers, enjoying a 9.8% audience share.
- 5 March – BBC One airs Mandela: The Living Legend, a two-part documentary series whose film crew had six months of unprecedented access to Nelson Mandela. The second part airs on 12 March.
- 7 March
  - Singer George Michael makes his first appearance on BBC One's Top of the Pops in 17 years, with a cover of Don McLean's protest song The Grave, but runs into conflict with the show's producers for an anti-war, anti-Blair T-shirt worn by some members of his band.
  - EastEnders announces the casting of a new family, the Ferreiras who will be the first Asian family to join the soap for a decade. They will move to Albert Square in the Summer.
- 8 March – Debut of ITV1's Reborn in the USA, a reality show in which ten British pop acts of the 1980s and 1990s tour the United States in the hope of reviving their careers. Those participating in the series include Sonia Evans, Leee John, Michelle Gayle and Tony Hadley. The show has already prompted controversy after Mark Shaw of Then Jericho decided to quit the series shortly before it went on air.
- 9 March
  - Teletext's often surreal and acerbic games magazine, Digitiser is published for the final time after ten years on air. The magazine is replaced the following day by GameCentral which features less of the humour favoured by its predecessor.
  - The 1982 American horror slasher film Friday the 13th Part III makes its UK television debut on ITV1 as part of the channel's Sunday night lineup.
- 10 March – Channel 4 is reprimanded by the Independent Television Commission for showing a documentary in which a Chinese artist appeared to eat a stillborn baby which the watchdog felt demonstrated a "lack of respect for human dignity". Graham Norton is also criticised for his joke about the late Maurice Gibb.
- 11 March – The BBC ends the deal with Sky Digital under which BBC channels are carried exclusively by Sky, meaning that satellite viewers will be able to watch BBC content without a viewing card. The changes will take effect from 30 May.
- 12 March
  - ITV announces that Cat Deeley will take over as presenter of the junior version of Stars in Their Eyes because regular host Matthew Kelly will be busy touring as part of a stage production when the series is scheduled to be recorded.
  - The climax to the Richard Hillman plot in Coronation Street is aired in which the serial killer attempts to kill himself and his wife Gail Platt and her children by driving their people carrier into the local canal. The conclusion marks the exit of the actor Brian Capron, who played Richard, from the soap.
- 13 March – Dog Breath, an advertisement for Wrigley's X-cite gum, becomes the most complained-about television advert in British history. It is withdrawn four days later after over 700 complaints.
- 14 March – Highlights of BBC One's 2003 Comic Relief fundraiser include Auf Wiedersehen, Pet, the Red Nose Special and Rowan Atkinson and Lenny Henry in the spoof documentary Lying to Michael Jackson.
- 19 March
  - Procter & Gamble announces it is ending its Daz Doorstep Challenge advertising campaign after ten years, feeling it is "old fashioned". It will be replaced with the soap-opera style campaign Cleaner Close.
  - BBC Three airs American Psycho, Mary Harron's black comedy based on the novel of the same name by Brett Easton Ellis.
- 20 March
  - As the 2003 invasion of Iraq begins, many broadcasters adjust their regular schedules to provide up to date coverage of unfolding events. BBC One's news programmes are all slightly extended in length in addition to blanket coverage on BBC News 24 across each day. One day earlier, ITV moves its main evening bulletin forward by an hour to 9pm, anchored by Trevor McDonald live from nearby Kuwait, and abandons its usual overnight schedule to provide a through the night simulcast of the ITV News Channel during the war.
  - George McGhee is appointed as Controller of BBC Programme Acquisition and will take up the position from early April.
- 22 March – ITN journalist Terry Lloyd is killed while covering the events of the Iraq War after he and his team of two cameramen and an interpreter are caught in a crossfire during fighting near the Shatt Al Basra Bridge in Basra. between US and Iraqi forces. His body and that of his Lebanese interpreter, Hussein Osman, are recovered and it is later discovered they were both shot by United States forces.
- 23 March – The Truth, the season nine finale of The X-Files and the last episode in the series original run, makes its terrestrial television debut on BBC Two.
- 26 March – BBC defence correspondent Paul Adams criticises BBC News coverage of the Iraq war in a memo to bosses, describing the coverage as painting an untruthful picture.
- 28 March – Debut of Extraordinary People on Five, each programme follows the lives of people with a rare medical condition and/or an unusual ability, many of these people do activities previously thought impossible for people in their condition.
- 30 March – Channel 4 News reporter Gaby Rado is found dead in Iraq, having apparently fallen from the roof of the Abu Sanaa hotel in the northern city of Sulaymaniyah. His death is believed to be unconnected to the ongoing military campaign in that country.
- 31 March
  - Birkbeck, University of London wins the 2002–03 series of University Challenge, beating Cranfield University 180–155.
  - Carlton Cinema goes off the air and is the last Carlton channel to close.

=== April ===
- 5 April – BBC Two launches The Big Read, a nationwide search for Britain's favourite book. The project is designed to encourage the nation to read, while people will be asked to vote for their favourite novel.
- 7 April
  - Children's program Balamory returns for its second series on CBeebies, with Julie Wilson Nimmo, Buki Akib, Miles Jupp, Juliet Cadzow, Andrew Agnew, Rodd Christensen, Mary Riggans and Kim Tserkezie all reprising their roles. In the first episode called "The Lost Letter", Spencer finds out Miss Hoolie didn't get the invitation to a surprise party for herself, so he asks PC Plum to look for the invitation before the party.
  - Following a trial at Southwark Crown Court lasting seven weeks, the Who Wants to Be a Millionaire? contestant Charles Ingram, his wife Diana and Tecwen Whittock are convicted by a majority verdict of "procuring the execution of a valuable security by deception". The Ingrams are each given 18-month prison sentences suspended for two years, each are fined £15,000 and each ordered to pay £10,000 towards prosecution costs. This is later increased to a joint £65,000 fine, but following another hearing in 2004 this is reduced to £30,00 due to them having financial difficulties. Charles Ingram is declared bankrupt in December 2004. Their quiz deception later becomes the subject of Quiz, a 2017 play written by James Graham, which is then subsequently turned into a three-part mini-serial on television in 2020.
  - Granada Television announces that Jonathan Wilkes is to replace Lisa Riley as host of You've Been Framed!.
- 8 April – Teenage singer Charlotte Church will guest present an edition of Have I Got News for You when the programme returns for a new series, the BBC confirms. At 17, she will become the youngest person to present the show. Other guest presenters in the forthcoming series which begins on 25 April, will include Martin Clunes and William Hague.
- 10 April – Channel 5's Milkshake! debuts hit Australian kids series Hi-5 that proved to be a huge success. Naomi Wilkinson speaks to presenter Nathan Foley to ask the viewers' questions.
- 14 April
  - The children's series Boohbah debuts on CITV.
  - Debut of 99 Things to do Before You Die on Five in which four people (Syirin Said, Steve Jones, Alexandra Aitken and Rob Deering) take on challenges from around the world. The series continues with a compilation of the best moments on 2 June and it was later repeated on Sky Travel until 2005.
- 20 April – Sky One airs the 300th episode of The Simpsons.
- 21 April – Channel 4 airs the 1000th episode of Hollyoaks.
- 26 April – Former Spandau Ballet singer Tony Hadley wins ITV1's Reborn in the USA.
- 27 April – After more than 23 years on the air, the final edition of soap opera Take the High Road is broadcast by STV.
- 29 April – The BBC rejects viewer complaints that its documentary, The Virgin Mary which was aired shortly before Christmas 2002 had tried to undermine religious beliefs. Complaints about a gay kiss in Casualty that aired in January are also rejected.

=== May ===
- 1 May – The Heroes Channel and The Games Channel both launch on VTV Cable.
- 2 May – The BBC announces that the character of Den Watts (Leslie Grantham) will return to EastEnders later this year, 14 years after departing in an episode where the character was believed to have died as a result of being shot. They also announce that the 2000 Olympic Games would be re shown.
- 10 May
  - The 2003 British Soap Awards, aired by ITV1 on 14 May, are presented in London by Des O'Connor and Melanie Sykes, during which actor Dean Sullivan is presented with a Special Achievement Award for his role as Jimmy Corkhill in Brookside. In a press interview held after the event, Sullivan urges Channel 4 not to axe Brookside, saying it "would be mad" to do so.
  - BBC Two airs the network television premiere of Luc Besson's 1999 French epic film version of Joan of Arc, starring Milla Jovovich, John Malkovich, Faye Dunaway, Dustin Hoffman and Tchéky Karyo.
- 11 May – The Observer reports that the BBC is to cut back on the number of self-promotional trailers following complaints from viewers and rival broadcasters. The newspaper also reports that the broadcasting of an ad for the BBC's digital service which featured the character of Fizz from the Tweenies pulling off her face to reveal June Brown as Dot Cotton from EastEnders had to be put back to a later time slot because some viewers complained it was giving their children nightmares.
- 12 May – Former cricketer Phil Tufnell wins the second series of I'm a Celebrity...Get Me Out of Here!.
- 13 May
  - Docudrama The Day Britain Stopped airs on BBC Two. It is based on a fictional disaster on 19 December 2003, in which a train strike is the first in a chain of events that lead to a meltdown of the country's transport system ending with a plane collision.
  - A teaser trailer for that year's Rugby World Cup is shown on ITV1, The tournament would start on 10 October.
- 14 May
  - Five have acquired the UK terrestrial television rights to the American supernatural drama Angel after Channel 4 dropped the programme from its schedule. The series makes its debut on Five on 2 June.
  - BBC Two re-airs the 2000 Olympic Games.
- 15 May – Kevin Kennedy is to leave Coronation Street in the Autumn after playing Curly Watts for 20 years, it is reported. The character will be involved in a dramatic storyline about police brutality and the door will be left open for him to return at a later date.
- 17 May – Following a public vote to find the UK's favourite book, the BBC's The Big Read reveals the top 100 in a special programme on BBC Two while BBC One airs the 2003 FA Cup Final.
- 18 May – Five airs the network television premiere of Brian Levant's 2000 prehistoric comedy prequel film The Flintstones in Viva Rock Vegas, starring Mark Addy, Stephen Baldwin, Kristen Johnston, Jane Krakowski, Thomas Gibson, Alan Cumming and Joan Collins.
- 19 May – Bollywood actor Dalip Tahil who will play the head of the Ferreira family in EastEnders, speaks out against criticism from British Asian actors who said the part should have gone to a UK-based actor.
- 20 May
  - Steve Anderson, ITV's controller of news, announces plans to move News at Ten because the programme is losing out on viewers in the 10pm slot where it goes head-to-head with the BBC Ten O'Clock News.
  - During what is meant to be a commercial break, Friendly TV accidentally broadcasts a conversation between members of its News Hound team who make allegations about aspects of Nicole Kidman's private life.
- 21 May – Five announces a new chat show which it hopes will rival ITV1's This Morning. The Terry and Gaby Show, presented by Terry Wogan and Gaby Roslin will debut on 2 June.
- 22 May – Prompted by their manager, four members of the pop group S Club storm out of an interview on BBC Three's Liquid News when presenter Claudia Winkleman asks them about their earnings.
- 23 May – ITV1, Channel 4, Five and other channels air an advert of Barclays with Samuel L. Jackson taking on "Money Moving Smoothly" and features a close-up shot of Rachel Stevens' legs walking on the pavement.
- 24 May – Jemini, the UK's entry for the 2003 Eurovision Song Contest receives Britain's worst Eurovision result after failing to attract a single point. The contest, staged in Riga, is won by Turkey's Sertab Erener with Everyway That I Can.
- 29 May – Toons & Tunes is rebranded as POP.
- 30 May – ITV1 broadcasts the final episode of Crossroads after the series was axed due to declining ratings. The finale sees hotel boss Angel Sampson, played by Jane Asher, waking up to find she is a supermarket checkout girl and that her tenure as boss of the Crossroads Hotel was all a dream.
- 31 May
  - Laura Jenkins, performing as Connie Francis wins the second junior series of Stars in Their Eyes.
  - Cilla Black presents the final edition of Blind Date, having announced her intention to quit the long-running game show in January. A change in the show's format is one of the factors in her decision to leave the show.

=== June ===
- 3 June – The Ferreiras make their EastEnders debut, becoming the first Asian family to join the soap since 1993 when Sanjay and Gita Kapoor arrived on screen.
- 4 June – It is reported that former Bucks Fizz singer Cheryl Baker suffered a fractured ankle in a skydiving accident the previous weekend while filming a new series, Drop the Celebrity for ITV1.
- 5 June – ITV1 airs the final episode of Night and Day.
- 9 June – The Muslim Council of Britain has complained about a recent episode of Spooks that featured a mosque at which people are taught to be suicide bombers after Birmingham's Central Mosque was defaced following the episode's transmission. The BBC says it has received no evidence that the incident is linked to the programme.
- 10 June – Bruce Forsyth is confirmed as the host of the final episode of the latest series of Have I Got News for You. Since adopting its guest presenter format late last year, the series has enjoyed a ratings boost, meaning the BBC has put plans to find a permanent replacement for Angus Deayton on hold. The episode presented by Forsyth famously includes him playing a game of Play Your Iraqi Cards Right, a twist on the format of the game show presented by him, but using a pack of Iraqi playing cards instead of a traditional deck.
- 11 June
  - The shopping channel Price-drop.tv is launched.
  - Channel 4 announces that its long-running soap Brookside will end in November.
- 12 June
  - A storyline involving the Coronation Street character Todd Grimshaw who rejected a place at Oxford University because his girlfriend said she would not follow him there, is criticised by the Sutton Trust, an organisation that encourages children from poorer backgrounds to apply to top universities. The Trust says it is disappointed as the storyline sends out the wrong message to children watching the soap. The issue also highlights the small number of soap characters who attend university.
  - Sky1 airs the final episode of Buffy the Vampire Slayer. BBC Two airs the episode on 18 December.
- 17 June – BBC Two airs a special edition of TOTP2 dedicated to the record producer Mickie Most who died on 30 May.
- 19 June – Actress Laura Sadler who plays Sandy Harper in Holby City, dies in hospital after she fell from a block of flats in west London a few days earlier. She sustained extensive head injuries as a result of the fall and had not regained consciousness. A subsequent inquest held at West London Coroner's Court records a verdict of accidental death.
- 20 June – The final edition of Play Your Cards Right is broadcast on ITV with Bruce Forsyth as presenter which in turn also marks the end of the final series of the game show to air on ITV. It has returned for one-off specials, presented by Ant & Dec on 15 October 2005 and Vernon Kay on 26 May 2007 as part of the series Gameshow Marathon.
- 22 June – ITV1 announces that it has axed the long-running Saturday night game show Blind Date.
- 25 June
  - Channel 4 Director of Television Tim Gardam announces he will step down from the job after five years, departing at the end of the year.
  - A viewer complaint about an edition of Channel 4's V Graham Norton in which Dustin Hoffman told a joke which included a taboo word is upheld by the Broadcasting Standards Commission. ITV's Tonight is also censured after airing an interview with a pregnant teenager which was perceived to have been of an exploitative nature because her predicament had largely come about because of a lack of knowledge.
- 28 June
  - ITV1 records one of its worst ever Saturday night audiences when coverage of the 2003 Wimbledon Championships is extended on BBC One.
  - The game show Judgement Day premieres on ITV1, hosted by Brian Conley. It is cancelled after two episodes due to very low ratings.
- 29 June – ITV1's holiday series Wish You Were Here...? airs for the last time.
- June – Grampian Television's Aberdeen headquarters move to new smaller studios in the city's Tullos area.

=== July ===
- 2 July – Lawyers representing Michael Barrymore who was dropped by London Weekend Television in September 2002 confirm he will take legal action against the broadcaster for an unpaid salary. He has largely been absent from television since news concerning the death of a man during a party at his property broke in 2001, although a series of My Kind of Music aired in February 2002.
- 4 July – The mid-afternoon regional news bulletin is moved from BBC Two to BBC One.
- 7 July – Mastermind returns to television for its first full series since 1997 with John Humphrys taking over the role of quizmaster.
- 8 July – The Independent Television Commission rejects complaints from the relatives of a victim of Dr. Harold Shipman that ITV's 2002 film about the serial killer was factually inaccurate. The Commission finds that although artistic licence was taken in some scenes, these had been "sympathetically presented" and were therefore not detrimental to the victim's family.
- 9 July – ITV1 drops two recently launched programmes from its primetime schedule because of poor ratings. The game show Judgement Day and comedy series Fortysomething, starring Hugh Laurie will air elsewhere in the schedule.
- 16 July – BBC One airs the final edition of Tomorrow's World. It will be fifteen years later in 2018 before a new edition of the programme is broadcast.
- 17 July
  - The Communications Act 2003 receives Royal Assent.
  - In its final annual report, the Broadcasting Standards Commission reveals that an episode of the BBC spy drama Spooks in which a character's head is pushed into a vat of boiling oil was the most complained about television programme during the past year.
  - Trevor Hyett steps down as editor of Five's The Terry and Gaby Show to work on other projects. His post will be taken over by the show's producer, James Winter. The programme has struggled in the ratings since its launch, but Five which has commissioned 200 editions of the series, says it will not cancel the show.
- 18 July – Sky News reporter James Forlong resigns following allegations a story shown in March involving the Iraq conflict was faked.
- 20 July – The BBC confirms that Dr David Kelly, found dead from a suspected suicide two days ago, was the main source for a controversial report that sparked a deep rift with the government.
- 25 July
  - Lord Currie is named as the first chairman of Ofcom.
  - Cameron Stout wins the fourth series of Big Brother.
- 28 July – Tabloid television station L!VE TV is relaunched on Sky Digital.

=== August ===
- 8 August – The BBC regains the broadcasting rights to show Premier League Football highlights from ITV after signing a three-year deal with them. The deal will take effect from the start of the 2004–05 season.
- 10 August – Channel 4 airs the British terrestrial television premiere of Straw Dogs.
- 18 August – In an interview with Radio Times, presenter Noel Edmonds says that he is partly responsible for the decline in the standards of British television after his BBC One show, Noel's House Party, went downhill after budget cuts.
- 21 August – ITV announces that its Saturday morning children's entertainment series SMTV Live will end after five years because of falling ratings and will be replaced by a new series in early 2004.
- 27 August – The BBC defends its decision to spend £10 million on the broadcast rights for the first Harry Potter film Harry Potter and the Philosopher's Stone, saying that its rivals were unprepared to invest in family viewing at Christmas. The film is part of a ten film package agreed with Warner Bros.
- 28 August – ITV ceases transmission of the New Zealand soap opera Shortland Street due to the regional afternoon slot which the show occupied becoming networked.
- 29 August
  - Research by Human Capital indicate that Saturday night television is now the least watched evening of television in the UK, with Monday nights being the most popular.
  - Today marks the 20th anniversary of the first episode of the long-running game show Blockbusters.
- 31 August – Light-hearted horticultural crime drama Rosemary & Thyme begins airing on ITV featuring Felicity Kendal and Pam Ferris as gardening sleuths.

=== September ===
- 1 September – The ITV celebrity idents package were updated with new sets and celebrities, featuring more pronounced blues and yellows, and removing the backstage feel. Even after this month, both Scottish and Grampian still kept use the celebrity idents filmed in 2002, while UTV had their own landscape idents two months later. However, the celebrity idents of Scottish and Grampian aired until the renaming of STV in 2006, making them the last ITV franchises to still air the 2002 ITV1 idents.
- 2 September
  - Laura Sadler's final scenes as Holby City nurse Sandy Harper are screened on the BBC One drama. Her character's exit from the series, devised by her mother and the show's producers, sees her secretly leaving the hospital for Australia after winning the lottery.
  - At Home with the Eubanks debuts on Five.
  - ITV1 airs the British terrestrial television premiere of Mission to Mars.
- 8 September – CNX is shut down and is replaced by Toonami.
- 13 September – The Smash Hits Chart Show returns to television. Previously on Five, the weekly 30-minute show makes its debut on Channel 4 as part of the T4 strand.
- 15 September
  - Channel 4 moves long-running game show Countdown from 4:15pm to 3:15pm, leading to questions being asked in Parliament and the launch of petitions to have it rescheduled back to its old slot.
  - BBC One moves the 4th episode of sitcom Trevor's World of Sport from Friday evening just after the 9:00pm watershed to Monday night after the 10:00pm news at short notice, leading to a public expression of displeasure by the show's creator, Andy Hamilton.
- 18 September – Peter Amory makes his final appearance as Chris Tate in Emmerdale after 14 years.
- 19 September – Channel 4 confirms that its breakfast show RI:SE will end in December; it is being axed because of low ratings.
- 21 September – BBC One airs Perfectly Frank, an EastEnders spin-off episode featuring the character Frank Butcher establishing a nightclub in Somerset.
- 25 September – The Daily Telegraph newspaper is the first to announce the return of the popular sci-fi drama series Doctor Who after a 14-year break. It returns to television in March 2005.
- 27 September – EastEnders is aired for the last time on BBC America. The programme is being axed because of poor ratings that are losing the channel most of its viewers.
- 29 September – Den Watts makes his return to EastEnders in an episode watched by 16 million viewers. Also today, EastEnders wins best soap at the Inside Soap Awards.

=== October ===
- 2 October – ITV is given permission by the Independent Television Commission to move its 10pm news bulletin to 10:30pm. Since returning in 2001, News at Ten has aired on at least three nights a week, but analysts have noted that not having a fixed time for a weekday news bulletin is unsettling for viewers and advertisers. The ITC feels a regular news bulletin at 10:30pm will be in viewers interests.
- 4 October – Alex Parks wins the second series of Fame Academy.
- 5 October
  - Coronation Street shows its first gay kiss.
  - Psychological illusionist Derren Brown controversially plays Russian roulette live on Channel 4, though with a slight delay allegedly in case the stunt went wrong. The stunt is later revealed to have been a hoax.
- 6 October – After BBC America axed EastEnders due to "abysmal ratings", almost 9,000 people have signed a petition calling on the channel to reinstate the show, BBC News reports.
- 7 October – The UK Government announced that the Carlton and Granada merger was agreed, which would be finalized as ITV plc in next year.
- 8 October – Delivering the Bafta Annual Lecture, ITV's head of programming, Nigel Pickard says that he is prepared to "bite the bullet" and drop poorly performing programmes and ageing presenters from its schedule, stating that "the days when you can tuck something into a little corner of peak against Panorama and hope it grows an audience" have gone.
- 10 October
  - Just over a year after returning to EastEnders, Sid Owen who plays Ricky Butcher in the soap, is to leave again, it is announced.
  - ITV begins to air live coverage of the 2003 Rugby World Cup with the opening game, in which Australia plays Argentina at Stadium Australia in Sydney.
- 15 October
  - BBC One airs the 2000 horror thriller Cherry Falls, starring Brittany Murphy and Michael Biehn.
  - BBC Two airs the documentary When Michael Portillo Became a Single Mum in which former Defence Secretary Michael Portillo assumes the mantle of Merseyside single mother Jenny Miner for a week.
  - Plans are announced for the DVD release of Brookside: Unfinished Business, a film that will continue storylines from Channel 4's Brookside which ends on 4 November. The DVD will be released two weeks later.
  - ITV1 airs the network premiere of the 2000 American romantic musical comedy-drama film Coyote Ugly.
- 18 October – The UK's top 21 favourite books are revealed by the BBC's The Big Read. Celebrity advocates will put their case for each of the books over the coming weeks before the winner is decided.
- 20 October – Cheryl Tweedy is found guilty of assault occasioning actual bodily harm after claiming self-defence during her trial, but cleared of racially aggravated assault. She is sentenced to 120 hours of community service and ordered to pay her victim £500 in compensation, as well as £3,000 prosecution costs.
- 22 October
  - Longtime broadcaster on the BBC and ITN and latterly news anchor on Sky News, Bob Friend announces his retirement.
  - ITV1 airs the network television premiere of X-Men.
- 29 October – BBC Two airs a special edition of TOTP2 featuring performances by Sheryl Crow which includes her new single "The First Cut Is the Deepest".
- 30 October
  - ITV1 screens a special live episode of The Bill to mark the show's 20th year on the air.
  - The Broadcasting Standards Commission upholds 30 viewer complaints about comedian Jonathan Ross's use of the F-word during the live broadcast of Red Nose Day 2003. Although the word was used at 10:30pm, after the watershed, the Commission felt it was likely children would still be watching.

=== November ===
- 3 November
  - Andy Page wins the 2003 series of Mastermind.
  - The Independent Television Commission rejects 21 viewer complaints about the first gay kiss to be featured in Coronation Street.
  - Channel 4 soap Hollyoaks begins airing five nights a week.
- 4 November – Channel 4 airs the final episode of Brookside, ending a run of 21 years. The episode is watched by two million viewers.
- 6 November – ITV confirms GMTV's Jenni Falconer as the main presenter of its new holiday series, How to Holiday. The programme, a replacement for Wish You Were Here...? will begin in early 2004.
- 10 November – The short-lived quiz show 19 Keys debuts on Five.
- 11 November – The BBC current affairs series Panorama, launched in 1953, becomes the first UK television show to reach its 50th anniversary on the air.
- 12 November
  - The BBC issues a statement in response to a newspaper report that actor Dalip Tahil faces being axed from EastEnders due to not having the correct work permit. The report in the previous Sunday's edition of The People had suggested that after Tahil joined the show from appearing in stage musical Bombay Dreams, neither he nor the BBC obtained proper authorisation from the Home Office to make the switch of employment legal. The BBC says "We are considering any potential problems with a view to resolving them as soon as possible."
  - UK Gold 2 is relaunched as UKG2, a channel aimed at the 16–34 audience demographic.
- 13 November – The British television premiere of Paul Verhoeven's 2000 science-fiction thriller Hollow Man airs on Five, starring Kevin Bacon and Elisabeth Shue.
- 14 November – The Office of Fair Trading gives Carlton and Granada the go-ahead to merge after the two companies agreed to adopt a new advertising sales system for ITV and to protect the interests of the smaller companies in the network, including SMG plc and Ulster Television.
- 15 November – The United Kingdom enters the inaugural Junior Eurovision Song Contest (staged in Copenhagen) with "My Song for the World" performed by 10-year-old Tom Morley.
- 16 November
  - Charles II: The Power and the Passion debuts on BBC One.
  - BBC Three airs the spoof documentary Sex, Lies and Michael Aspel which "unmasks" the mild mannered television presenter Michael Aspel as an international womaniser who fathered several children through a string of affairs.
- 20 November – UTV replaces its network-inspired idents with a series of landscape films of Northern Ireland, in the form of a panorama shot as the camera revolved around a location.
- 21 November – BBC Three Controller Stuart Murphy confirms that the channel's entertainment news programme Liquid News will end in April 2004.
- 22 November – ITV's coverage of the Final of the 2003 Rugby World Cup in which England beat Australia 20–17 and win the competition is watched by more than 10 million viewers, a record figure for Saturday morning television. End of year figures produced by BARB place it as the ninth most watched television programme of the year with 12.3 million viewers.
- 23 November – The 40th anniversary of the first broadcast of Doctor Who, the iconic sci-fi series would return to television in March 2005.
- 27 November – The BBC unveils a revamped version of its news channel in an attempt to make it appear more dynamic to viewers. Changes include a new studio set and redesigned branding and graphics.
- 28 November
  - Some of the BBC's radio and television services, including BBC Radio 4, BBC Radio 5 Live and BBC News 24, are blacked out by a power cut and a fire alert.
  - Top of the Pops is relaunched in the face of declining ratings with a new set and theme tune.
- 29 November – Pop Idol judge Pete Waterman is deluged with unwanted phone calls after fellow judge Simon Cowell gives out his mobile phone number during an edition of ITV2's Pop Idol Extra. Cowell says he did it because Waterman revealed his home address on the previous weekend's show.

=== December ===
- 1 December – The BBC's commercial rivals express concerns after Coca-Cola signs a deal with The Official UK Chart Company that will allow it to be mentioned on Top of the Pops and The Radio 1 Chart Show.
- 5 December – The third series of US spy drama 24 will not air on BBC Two after negotiations between Fox and the BBC end without a deal being reached.
- 6 December
  - Simon Cowell makes a public apology to his fellow Pop Idol judge Pete Waterman after giving out his mobile phone number during an edition of ITV2's Pop Idol Extra the previous weekend.
  - Westlife's version of the Barry Manilow classic "Mandy" is voted the 2003 Record of the Year by ITV viewers, giving the Irish boyband their third win.
- 8 December – BBC News 24 is relaunched with a new set and titles, as well as a new Breaking News sting. Networked news on BBC One and Two remains with the same titles though the set has been redesigned in a similar style to that of the new News 24. The relaunch had been scheduled for the previous Monday (1 December), but was delayed due to a power failure the week before which had disrupted work on the new set.
- 13 December – J. R. R. Tolkien's The Lord of the Rings trilogy wins the BBC's The Big Read after receiving 23% of the vote.
- 14 December – Jonny Wilkinson, whose last minute drop-goal clinched the 2003 Rugby World Cup for England, is named as this year's BBC Sports Personality of the Year, becoming the 50th person to be presented with the award.
- 15 December
  - Comedian Graham Norton has signed an exclusive deal with the BBC where he will help to develop ideas for Saturday night entertainment. He will join them in April 2004.
  - Five airs a semi-fictional drama Hear the Silence, based on the MMR vaccine controversy which started when Andrew Wakefield published a paper claiming a possible link between the MMR vaccine and autism.
- 16 December
  - After hearing that EastEnders actor Dalip Tahil who plays Dan Ferreira in the soap, faces deportation after his appeal to work in the UK was rejected by the Home Office, MP Keith Vaz raises the matter with Home Secretary David Blunkett who says he will look into the situation. However, an attempt by Tahil to make a retrospective application for a work permit is turned down and he is forced to leave the series though eventually allowed to remain in the UK.
  - BBC Two airs a special two-act edition of TOTP2 featuring performances from Fleetwood Mac and James Brown.
- 17 December
  - BBC Scotland will not pursue the idea of a Scottish Six news programme following a major review of output which indicates a majority of viewers are satisfied with the status quo.
  - Sky One signs a deal with Fox to broadcast the third series of 24.
- 19 December
  - The final edition of RI:SE is aired on Channel 4. It will be replaced by series such as Friends and The Salon in its early morning slot.
  - The final episode of the long-running game show Fifteen to One with William G. Stewart as host is aired on Channel 4. The programme is revived a decade later presented by Sandi Toksvig.
  - The Day Britain Stopped is shown again on BBC Two.
- 20 December – Michelle McManus wins the second and final series of Pop Idol. Her debut single, "All This Time" reaches number one in the UK Singles Chart in January 2004.
- 25 December
  - BBC One airs the network premiere of The Tigger Movie.
  - "Sleepless in Peckham", the final episode of Only Fools and Horses, is aired on BBC One. Preliminary figures released two days later indicate it is watched by 15.5 million viewers.
- 26 December
  - Celebrity Mastermind returns for a full series on BBC Two.
  - Debut of That Was the Week We Watched on BBC Two, narrated by actor Simon Pegg and showing six nights a week, except on New Year's Eve about looking back to past television shows in the Radio Times and TVTimes schedules from the years 1967, 1970, 1973, 1977, 1982 and 1986. The series continues on 1 January 2004.
  - ITV1 airs the network premiere of the 2000 Christmas film The Grinch, starring Jim Carrey and Josh Ryan Evans.
- 27 December – The final edition of SMTV Live airs on ITV1. The programme is cancelled due to a decline in the number of viewers.
- 29 December
  - Launch of the Office of Communications known as Ofcom. The watchdog which formally inherits the duties that had previously been the responsibility of five different regulators. Ofcom replaces the Broadcasting Standards Commission, Independent Television Commission, Radio Authority, Office of Telecommunications and Radiocommunications Agency.
  - BBC One airs the Network Premiere of the 2000 adventure film Cast Away, starring Tom Hanks and Helen Hunt.
- 31 December
  - New Year's Eve highlights on BBC One include the films Anna and the King and Air Force One.
  - EastEnders screens a lesbian kiss between two of its characters, Zoe Slater (Michelle Ryan) and Kelly Taylor (Brooke Kinsella) who share the intimate moment after surviving a minibus crash in the Scottish Highlands.
  - BBC Two airs a special edition of TOTP2 celebrating the 40th anniversary of Top of the Pops and featuring performances from the show's four decade history.
  - On ITV1, Martin Kemp stars in The Brides in the Bath, a film about George Joseph Smith.

== Debuts ==
=== BBC (One/Two/Three/Four/CBBC/CBeebies/News 24) ===
- 6 January – Kerching! (2003–2006)
- 7 January –
  - Little Robots (2003–2005)
  - Red Cap (2003–2004)
- 8 January –
  - Politics Show (2003–2011)
  - Daily Politics (2003–2018)
- 9 January – Trust (2003)
- 11 January – Taken (2002)
- 12 January – This Week (2003–2019)
- 19 January – The Lost Prince (2003)
- 4 February – Posh Nosh (2003)
- 9 February –
  - Burn It (2003)
  - Monkey Dust (2003–2004)
- 10 February – Swiss Toni (2003–2004)
- 17 March – My Dad's the Prime Minister (2003–2004)
- 26 March – Rehab (2003)
- 27 March – New Tricks (2003–2015)
- 28 March – The Other Boleyn Girl (2003)
- 29 March – The Murder Game (2003)
- 15 April – Grease Monkeys (2003–2004)
- 17 April – Servants (2003)
- 28 April – Murphy's Law (2003–2007)
- 9 May – Cambridge Spies (2003)
- 12 May – Early Doors (2003–2004)
- 18 May – State of Play (2003)
- 31 May – Strange (2003)
- 4 June – Boo! (2003–2006)
- 9 June – Comedy Connections (2003–2008)
- 23 June – Spine Chillers (2003)
- 21 July – The Adventures of Marco & Gina (2003)
- 15 August –
  - Trevor's World of Sport (2003)
  - Eyes Down (2003–2004)
- 23 August – Death in Holy Orders (2003)
- 1 September – Sergeant Stripes (2003–2004)
- 8 September – Grass (2003)
- 9 September – The Crouches (2003–2005)
- 11 September –
  - Canterbury Tales (2003)
  - QI (2003–present)
- 16 September –
  - Little Britain (2003–2007)
  - The Key (2003)
- 27 September – Byron (2003)
- 29 September – Wide-Eye (2003–2004)
- 4 October – Eroica (2003)
- 10 November – Absolute Power (2003–2005)
- 11 November – Rich Hall's Fishing Show (2003)
- 16 November – Charles II: The Power and the Passion (2003)
- 16 December – The Private Life of Samuel Pepys (2003)
- 26 December – That Was the Week We Watched (2003)

=== ITV (including ITV1 & ITV2) ===
- 1 January – Pollyanna (2003)
- 2 January – Serious & Organised (2003)
- 4 January – Yoko! Jakamoko! Toto! (2003–2005)
- 11 January – Miffy and Friends (2003–2007)
- 12 January – Sons and Lovers (2003)
- 19 January –
  - Diggin' It (2003–2005)
  - The Royal (2003–2011)
- 26 January – State of Mind (2003)
- 7 February – The Last Detective (2003–2007)
- 9 February – The Second Coming (2003)
- 12 February – Without You (2003)
- 16 February – The Commander (2003–2008)
- 23 March –
  - Hardware (2003–2004)
  - William and Mary (2003–2005)
- 1 April – Girls in Love (2003–2005)
- 11 April – Lucky Jim (2003)
- 14 April – Danielle Cable: Eyewitness (2003)
- 16 April – Watermelon (2003)
- 3 May – MIT: Murder Investigation Team (2003–2005)
- 18 May – Blue Murder (2003–2009)
- 29 June – Fortysomething (2003)
- 26 June – PointlessBlog (2003–2007)
- 25 August – Alibi (2003)
- 31 August –
  - Broken Morning (2003)
  - Rosemary & Thyme (2003–2007)
- 1 September – Invader Zim (2001–2002)
- 4 September – Sweet Medicine (2003)
- 22 September – Too Good to Be True (2003)
- 28 September – Boudica (2003)
- 29 September – Family (2003)
- 5 October – Sparkling Cyanide (2003)
- 10 October – P.O.W. (2003)
- 11 October – Creature Comforts (2003–2006)
- 12 October – Henry VIII (2003)
- 25 October – Single (2003)
- 29 October – Gifted (2003)
- 3 November – Our New Life in Everwood (2002–2006)
- 15 November – Junior Eurovision Song Contest (2003–2005)
- 17 November – Between the Sheets (2003)
- 21 December – Promoted To Glory (2003)
- 28 December – The Mayor of Casterbridge (2003)
- 31 December – The Brides in the Bath (2003)
- Unknown – Meg and Mog (2003–2004)

=== Channel 4 ===
- 12 January – The Salon (2003–2004)
- 14 January – Buried (2003)
- 6 February – 20 Things to Do Before You're 30 (2003)
- 3 April – The Real Casanova (2003)
- 8 April – 40 (2003)
- 21 May – How Clean Is Your House? (2003–2009)
- 20 August – Coming Up (TV series) (Anthology for short films) (2003–2013)
- 13 September – The Smash Hits Chart Show (2003–2004)
- 19 September —
  - Peep Show (2003–2015)
  - Born to Be Different (2003 – present)
- 5 December – The Illustrated Mum (2003)

=== Five ===
- 28 January – Boomtown (2002–2003)
- 28 March – Extraordinary People (2003–2012)
- 10 April – Hi-5 (2003–2009, UK broadcast)
- 14 April – 99 Things to do Before You Die (2002–2003)
- 2 September – At Home with the Eubanks (2003)
- 27 October –
  - MechaNick
  - Softies
- 10 November – 19 Keys (2003)
- 15 December – Hear the Silence (2003)

=== Sky ===
- 16 February – Mile High (2003–2005)
- 26 July – Road Wars (2003–2010)
- Unknown – Life with Bonnie (2002–2004)

=== Cartoon Network UK ===
- 10 February – ¡Mucha Lucha! (2002–2005)
- 7 April – Ozzy & Drix (2002–2004)
- 1 September – Codename: Kids Next Door (2002–2007)
- 10 November – Star Wars: Clone Wars (2003–2005)

=== Boomerang UK ===
- 7 April –
  - What's New Scooby Doo (7 April 2003 – 21 July 2006)
  - Baby Looney Tunes (2003–2005)

=== Toonami UK ===
- 3 November – Teen Titans (TV series) (2003–2006)

=== Disney Channel UK ===
- 6 January – Fillmore! (2003–2004)
- 20 October – Lilo & Stitch: The Series (20 October 2003 – 29 July 2006)

=== Pop/Pop Plus ===
- Undated
  - The Berenstain Bears (2002–2003)
  - Tracey McBean (2001–2006)

== Channels ==
=== New channels ===
| Date | Channel |
|---|---|
| 15 January | Ftn |
| 15 January | UK Bright Ideas |
| 3 February | Channel U |
| 9 February | BBC Three |
| 1 September | Paramount Comedy 2 |
| 8 September | Toonami |
| 8 September | Pop Plus |
| 16 December | VH2 |

=== Defunct channels ===
| Date | Channel |
|---|---|
| 1 January | The Studio |
| January | The Racing Channel |
| 9 February | BBC Choice |
| 31 March | Carlton Cinema |
| 8 September | CNX |

=== Rebranded channels ===
| Date | Old Name | New Name |
|---|---|---|
| 29 May | Toons and Tunes | Pop |
| 31 October | Sky Movies Premier/Max/Cinema | Sky Movies 1, Sky Movies 2, Sky Movies 3, Sky Movies 4, Sky Movies 5, Sky Movies 6, Sky Movies 7, Sky Movies 8, Sky Movies 9, Sky Cinema 1, Sky Cinema 2 |

== Television shows ==
=== Changes of network affiliation ===
| Show | Moved from | Moved to |
|---|---|---|
| Robot Wars | BBC Two | Five |
| Beyblade | Cartoon Network | Five |
| Thomas & Friends | Nick Jr. | ITV1 |
| The Flintstones | BBC One | ITV1 |
| What About Mimi? | Sky One | ITV1 |
| Don't Try This at Home | ITV1 | Challenge |
| Pippi Longstocking | ITV1 | Channel 4 |
| What's New, Scooby-Doo? | Boomerang | CBBC on BBC One |

=== Returning this year after a break of one year or longer ===
- 22 February – After Dark returns to British television on BBC Four (last on Channel 4 in 1997)
- 16 October – Superstars returns to BBC One (1973–1985, 2003–2005)

== Continuing television shows ==
=== 1920s ===
- BBC Wimbledon (1927–1939, 1946–2019, 2021–present)

=== 1930s ===
- Trooping the Colour (1937–1939, 1946–2019, 2023–present)
- The Boat Race (1938–1939, 1946–2019, 2021–present)

=== 1950s ===
- Andy Pandy (1950–1970, 2002–2005)
- Panorama (1953–present)
- What the Papers Say (1956–2008)
- The Sky at Night (1957–present)
- Blue Peter (1958–present)
- Grandstand (1958–2007)

=== 1960s ===
- Coronation Street (1960–present)
- Songs of Praise (1961–present)
- Top of the Pops (1964–2006)
- Match of the Day (1964–present)
- Call My Bluff (1965–2005)
- The Money Programme (1966–2010)

=== 1970s ===
- Emmerdale (1972–present)
- Newsround (1972–present)
- Last of the Summer Wine (1973–2010)
- Arena (1975–present)
- One Man and His Dog (1976–present)
- Top Gear (1977–2001, 2002–present)
- Grange Hill (1978–2008)
- Ski Sunday (1978–present)
- Antiques Roadshow (1979–present)
- Question Time (1979–present)

=== 1980s ===
- Children in Need (1980–present)
- Postman Pat (1981–present)
- Timewatch (1982–present)
- Countdown (1982–present)
- The Bill (1984–2010)
- Channel 4 Racing (1984–2016)
- Thomas & Friends (1984–present)
- EastEnders (1985–present)
- Comic Relief (1985–present)
- Casualty (1986–present)
- ChuckleVision (1987–2009)
- This Morning (1988–present)

=== 1990s ===
- Stars in Their Eyes (1990–2006, 2015)
- Heartbeat (1992–2010)
- Breakfast with Frost (1993–2005)
- Animal Hospital (1994–2004)
- Room 101 (1994–2007, 2012–2018)
- Time Team (1994–2013)
- The National Lottery Draws (1994–2017)
- Top of the Pops 2 (1994–present)
- Silent Witness (1996–present)
- Y Clwb Rygbi, Wales (1997–present)
- Dream Team (1997–2007)
- Family Affairs (1997–2005)
- Midsomer Murders (1997–present)
- Who Wants to Be a Millionaire? (1998–2014)
- Bob the Builder (1998–present)
- British Soap Awards (1999–2019, 2022–present)
- Holby City (1999–2022)
- My Parents Are Aliens (1999–2006)

=== 2000s ===
- Doctors (2000–present)
- Big Brother (2000–2018)
- The Weakest Link (2000–2012, 2017)
- The Kumars (2001–2006, 2014)
- Popworld (2001–2007)
- Real Crime (2001–2011)
- UK Top 40 (2002–2005)
- Dick and Dom in da Bungalow (2002–2006)
- Harry Hill's TV Burp (2002–2012)
- I'm a Celebrity...Get Me Out of Here! (2002–present)
- Spooks (2002–2011)
- Angelina Ballerina (2002–2005)
- Mr. Bean: the Animated Series (2002–2004)
- River City (2002–2026)

== Ending this year ==
- Crossroads (1964–1988, 2001–2003)
- Wish You Were Here...? (1974–2003, 2008)
- Play Your Cards Right (1980–1987, 1994–1999, 2002–2003)
- Take the High Road (1980–2003)
- Only Fools and Horses (1981–1996, 2001–2003, 2014)
- Brookside (1982–2003)
- James the Cat (1984–1992, 1998–2003)
- Blind Date (1985–2003, 2017–2019)
- Fifteen to One (1988–2003, 2013–2019)
- Get Your Own Back (1991–2003)
- 999 (1992–2003)
- Barbara (1995–2003)
- Cold Feet (1998–2003, 2016–present)
- Diggit (1998–2003)
- SMTV Live (1998–2003)
- Mopatop's Shop (1999–2003)
- Smack the Pony (1999–2003)
- The Tribe (1999–2003)
- At Home with the Braithwaites (2000–2003)
- Clocking Off (2000–2003)
- The Hoobs (2001–2003)
- Pop Idol (2001–2003)
- Ky's Bommerang (2001–2003)
- Night and Day (2001–2003)
- The Goal Rush (2001–2003)
- The Office (2001–2003)
- RI:SE (2002–2003)
- Captain Abercromby (2002–2003)
- Fame Academy (2002–2003)
- Russian Roulette (2002–2003)
- Rich Hall's Fishing Show (2003)
- Too Good to Be True (2003)

== Births ==
- 30 April – Emily Carey, actress and model
- 18 July – Lucy Hutchinson, actress
- 25 September – Alexander Aze, actor - Bella Ramsey, actress

== Deaths ==
| Date | Name | Age | Cinematic Credibility |
|---|---|---|---|
| 1 January | Cyril Shaps | 79 | actor (Doctor Who) |
| 8 January | Ron Goodwin | 77 | theme tune composer |
| 9 January | Peter Tinniswood | 66 | radio and TV comedy scriptwriter, and author |
| 13 January | Elisabeth Croft | 95 | actor (Edith Tatum in ATV soap Crossroads) |
| 7 February | Stephen Whittaker | 55 | actor and television director |
| 21 February | Barry Bucknell | 91 | television presenter |
| 11 March | Kevin Laffan | 80 | writer and author (creator of Emmerdale) |
| 15 March | Thora Hird | 91 | actress (Edie Pegden in Last of the Summer Wine) |
| 22 March | Terry Lloyd | 50 | news reporter, killed during Iraq War skirmish |
| 30 March | Gaby Rado | 48 | news reporter, killed during Iraq War |
| 16 April | Danny O'Dea | 91 | actor (Eli Duckett in Last of the Summer Wine) |
| 22 April | Berkeley Smith | 84 | television broadcaster |
| 12 May | Jeremy Sandford | 72 | television scriptwriter |
| 24 May | Rachel Kempson | 92 | actress (Jennie: Lady Randolph Churchill, The Jewel in the Crown) |
| 30 May | John Roberts | 75 | historian and television presenter (The Triumph of the West) |
| 7 June | Tony McAuley | 63 | television producer |
| 15 June | Philip Stone | 79 | actor (Coronation Street, The Rat Catchers, Justice) |
| 19 June | Laura Sadler | 22 | actress (Sandy Harper in Holby City) |
| 1 July | George Roper | 69 | comedian (The Comedians) |
| 9 July | Valerie Gearon | 69 | actress |
| 2 August | Don Estelle | 70 | actor (It Ain't Half Hot Mum) |
| 6 August | Larry Taylor | 85 | actor |
| 10 August | Constance Chapman | 91 | actor |
| 12 August | Jackie Hamilton | 66 | comedian (The Comedians) |
| 24 August | Zena Walker | 69 | actress (The Adventures of Robin Hood) |
| 24 August | Kent Walton | 86 | television sports commentator and presenter |
| 2 September | Peter West | 83 | BBC sports commentator |
| 4 September | Ben Aris | 66 | actor (Hi-de-Hi!, To the Manor Born) |
| 11 September | Stuart Golland | 58 | actor (George Ward in Heartbeat) |
| 23 September | Sarah Parkinson | 41 | producer and writer of radio and television programmes |
| 30 September | John Hawkesworth | 82 | television producer and scriptwriter |
| 10 October | Julia Trevelyan Oman | 73 | television set designer |
| 23 October | Tony Capstick | 59 | comedian and actor |
| 8 November | Bob Grant | 71 | actor (Jack Harper in On the Buses) |
| 11 November | Robert Brown | 82 | actor (The Newcomers) |
| 11 November | Don Taylor | 67 | television director |
| 19 November | Gillian Barge | 63 | actress |
| 20 November | Robert Addie | 43 | actor (Robin of Sherwood) |
| 23 November | Patricia Burke | 83 | actress (The Adventures of Robin Hood) |
| 26 November | Gordon Reid | 64 | actor |
| 22 December | Rose Hill | 89 | actress (Madame Fanny La Fan in 'Allo 'Allo!) |
| 27 December | Alan Bates | 69 | actor (An Englishman Abroad) |
| 29 December | Bob Monkhouse | 75 | comedian and entertainer (The Golden Shot, Celebrity Squares, Family Fortunes, Bob's Full House, The $64,000 Question, The Big Breakfast, Monkhouse's Memory Masters, Wipeout) |

== See also ==
- 2003 in British music
- 2003 in British radio
- 2003 in the United Kingdom
- List of British films of 2003
