= Amnesty International UK Media Awards 1998 =

The 7th annual Amnesty International UK Media Awards took place on 25 June at the Park Lane Hotel, London. The awards ceremony was hosted by Melvyn Bragg.

David Bull said at the awards:

Despite 1998 being the 50th anniversary of the Universal Declaration of Human Rights there has been no shortage of important human rights abuse stories in the last year. High-profile issues such as the massacres in Algeria and the situation in Indonesia have received significant coverage but there have also been less well-publicised abuses that still cry out for international scrutiny.

In total there were 7 awards, including the introduction of the Special Award for Human Rights Journalism Under Threat. The other award categories were National Print, Periodicals, Photojournalism, Radio, Television Documentary and Television News. For eligibility, the entries had to be published or transmitted between 16 April 1997 and 30 April 1998.

The overall winner was Robert Fisk for a series of articles on Algeria published in The Independent.

The Special Award for Human Rights Journalism Under Threat was made to Nosa Igiebor and the staff of Tell magazine, Nigeria.

The judges for all categories were Nicky Campbell, Mark Lattimer, (Note: At the time of the 1998 Awards, Mark Lattimer was Communications Director for Amnesty International UK) Penny Smith, Polly Toynbee and Kirsty Young.

== Shortlist and Awards 1998 ==
1998
Category	Title	Organisation	Journalists	Refs
National Print
National Print	'A Holy Betrayal'	The Guardian	Maggie O'Kane	
National Print	A series of articles on Algeria; Overall Winner	The Independent	Robert Fisk	
National Print	'Face To Face with Bosnia's Doctor Death' & 'Net Finally Closes Around War Criminals'	The Observer	Ed Vulliamy	
National Print	'Surviving Algeria'	The Observer	John Sweeney	
Periodicals
Periodicals	'Afghanistan Diary: My Escape from the Taliban'	Marie Claire	Breshna Baktash	
Periodicals	'A Ghost of a Chance: A Survey of the Balkans'	The Economist	Brooke Unger	
Periodicals	"Tibet: Where Having Children is a Crime"	Marie Claire	Vittoria DAlessio	
Photojournalism
Photojournalism	'Bosnian Refugee Returning Home'		Howard Davies	
Photojournalism	"Lord of the Flies - The Mental Landscape of War"		Stuart Freedman	
Photojournalism	'The Unavenged'		Jenny Matthews	
Radio
Radio	Special Assignment: Algeria	BBC Radio 5	John Sweeney, produced by Vera Frankl and Anna Parkinson, edited by Gwyneth Williams	
Radio	'Face The Facts',	BBC Radio 4	John Waite, produced by Susan Mitchell, edited by Graham Ellis	
Radio	"Escape from Chechnya"	Series, "Out of the Fire"; BBC Radio South	Marc Jobst; John Simpson	
Special Award for Human Rights Journalism; Under Threat
Special Award for Human Rights Journalism; Under Threat	Presented to Nosa Igiebor and the staff of Tell Magazine. Launched in 1991, Tell reports on economic and political events and the struggle for democracy and human rights in Nigeria. Tell has continued to publish throughout the period of Nigerian dictatorship despite intimidation, harassment and the detention without charge or trial of Mr Igiebor and other senior members of the Tell staff.			
Television; Documentary
Television; Documentary	'Getting Away with Murder'	Correspondent Special; BBC TV	Michael Ignatieff, Fiona Murch, Giselle Portenier	
Television; Documentary	'Making a Killing' & 'Profit Before Principle'	Granada Television: World In Action	Martyn Gregory Films	
Television; Documentary	"The Grave"	Channel 4 Television: True Stories	Produced by Soul Purpose Productions	
Television; News
Television; News	report on Algeria	BBC TV News	Fergal Keane	
Television; News	reports on Muslim refugees in Bosnia	BBC TV News	David Loyn	
Television; News	Report on the Xinjiang province in China	Direct TV for ITN Channel Four News	Gaby Rado	
