= Tell (magazine) =

Nigerian Weekly News magazine

- Founders: Dare BabarInsa; Nosa Igiebor; Kolawole Ilori; Dele Omotunde; Onome Osifo-Whiskey
- Publisher: TELL Communications Ltd.
- Editor-in-chief: Nosa Igiebor
- Founded: 15 April 1991
- Headquarters: 8, Ashabi Cole street, Central Business District, Agidingbi, Ikeja, Lagos
- Country: Nigeria
- Circulation: 20,000,000
- Website: http://www.tell.ng

Tell is a weekly news magazine published in Nigeria. In 2007, BBC News described it as "one of Nigeria's most respected business magazines".

== Foundation ==
Tell magazine published its first edition on 15 April 1991. All five of the founding editors had worked at Newswatch, where they learned to create in-depth, investigative feature stories. They left that magazine due to low pay and disagreements with senior management, hoping that the new magazine would be more fulfilling. Although the magazine's founders had high ambitions, they were not initially hostile to the government. However, they were determined to be free of government or political influence.

== Babangida era ==
The magazine questioned whether General Ibrahim Babangida was sincere in saying he would hand over to a civilian government. The 2 May 1993 edition with headline "Transition: 21 Traps against handover" was seized, and had to be reprinted in tabloid format. Two more major seizures occurred before Babangida was forced from power in August 1993. In all, 500,000 copies were seized in the last four months of Babangida's rule. Tell's circulation rose to as many as 100,000 copies each week in the build-up to the June 1993 presidential election and in the subsequent confusion. Facing harassment from security forces, the magazine began printing underground in July 1993. On 15 August 1993 police raided the offices and arrested editor-in-chief Nosa Igiebor and editors Kola Ilori, Onome Osifo-Whiskey and Ayodele Akinkuoto. holding them for 12 days.

== Abacha era ==
Conditions became more difficult after General Sani Abacha took power in a November 1993 military coup. On 2 January 1994 armed policemen and security officers seized 50,000 copies of the magazine at the printer's premises. The issue was titled "The Return of Tyranny - Abacha bares his fangs". The editors resorted to guerrilla tactics to survive, forming cells and frequently moving, with the magazine printed covertly in different locations. They relied on help from civilians, who supported the magazine by providing office space, buying copies and helping in many other ways. Several Tell's staff, including Zainab Dabup, Bola Bolawole, Bilkisu Yusuf, Josh Arinze, and others were persecuted for their investigative journalism. Many were threatened and forced to flee for the safety of themselves and loved ones.

After the newspaper published a story that revealed that Abacha was suffering from cirrhosis of the liver, police and military raided Igiebor's house while he was away. His wife was maltreated when she said she did not know where he was. A soldier pointed a gun at his four-year-old daughter, threatening to shoot if Igiebor was not produced. Igiebor was jailed for six months from late 1995 to 1996, and later fled abroad to escape the threat of assassination. Osifo-Whiskey also spent six months in detention, arrested after a year in which he avoided his own house and stayed with friends, one of whom was killed.

== Awards and recognition ==
In 1993, the Committee to Protect Journalists presented Igiebor its International Press Freedom Award, "an annual recognition of courageous journalism", for his work with the magazine. In 1998, Nosa Igiebor and the staff as a whole were awarded the Special Award for Human Rights Journalism Under Threat at the Amnesty International UK Media Awards. The award's notice stated; "Tell has continued to publish throughout the period of Nigerian dictatorship despite intimidation, harassment and the detention without charge or trial of Mr Igiebor and other senior members of the Tell staff."
