= Death of Jeremiah Duggan =

2003 death in Wiesbaden, Germany

Jeremiah Joseph Duggan
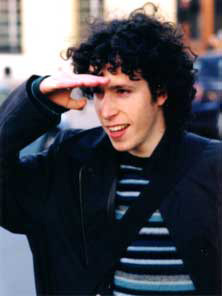
- Born: 10 November 1980; North London, England, UK
- Died: 27 March 2003 (aged 22); Berliner Straße, Bundesstraße 455, Wiesbaden, Hesse, Germany (50.060617°N 8.283164°E)
- Resting place: Highgate Cemetery, London, England, UK
- Movement: LaRouche movement
- Parent(s): Erica Duggan, Hugo Duggan

Jeremiah Joseph Duggan (10 November 1980 – 27 March 2003) was a British student in Paris who died during a visit to Wiesbaden, Hesse, Germany, after being struck by several motorists on a dual carriageway. The circumstances of Duggan's death became a matter of dispute because, at the time he died, he was attending a youth "cadre" school organised by the LaRouche movement, an international network led by the American political activist Lyndon LaRouche.

German police concluded that Duggan had committed suicide after running several kilometres from the apartment in which he had been staying, then jumping in front of early-morning traffic. A British coroner rejected a suicide verdict in 2003 after hearing the London Metropolitan Police describe the LaRouche movement as a political cult. Duggan telephoned his mother, Erica Duggan, fifty minutes before he died, apparently distressed about his involvement in it.

Arguing that German police had not investigated the case thoroughly, Erica Duggan commissioned forensic reports which suggested the car crash might have been staged and that Duggan had died elsewhere. After protracted litigation in the UK and Germany, the High Court in London ordered a second inquest in 2010, and in 2012 the Frankfurt Higher Regional Court ordered the Wiesbaden police to reopen their investigation. In 2015 the coroner upheld that Duggan had been killed in the accident, but rejected a suicide verdict, adding that unexplained injuries suggested an "altercation at some stage before his death."

The LaRouche movement attributed criticism of its involvement in the case to LaRouche's political opponents, including former UK Prime Minister Tony Blair and former US Vice President Dick Cheney, who they say sought to discredit LaRouche over his opposition to the 2003 Iraq War and his criticism of the scientific consensus on anthropogenic global warming.

== Background ==
=== Duggan family ===
Jeremiah Duggan was born in North London to Erica Duggan, a Jewish schoolteacher from South Africa; and her husband, Hugo Duggan, who was raised in Ireland. Erica's father left Berlin in 1933; many family members were killed during the Holocaust. Erica, in turn, left South Africa due to apartheid. She, Hugo, Jeremiah and his two older sisters made their home in the London suburb of Golders Green. Duggan's parents divorced when he was aged 7.

Duggan attended Fitzjohn's Primary School in Hampstead, Quainton School for Boys, and won a scholarship to Christ's Hospital school in Sussex as a boarder. After his A-levels, he spent time in India then trained in Israel as a youth leader. Duggan was interested in the arts, music and the theatre, and in 2001 moved to Paris to study French at the British Institute and English at the Sorbonne. Duggan's mother said he became interested in politics after 9/11; his strong opposition to the Iraq War led him to become involved with the LaRouche movement.

=== LaRouche movement ===
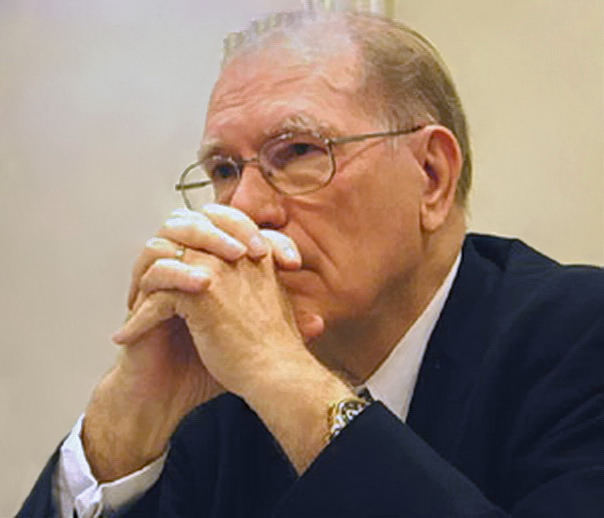
Lyndon LaRouche, 2006

Lyndon LaRouche and his German wife, Helga Zepp-LaRouche, ran a global political network of publications, committees and a youth cadre based in Leesburg, Virginia, United States, and in Wiesbaden, Hesse, Germany. The movement in Germany is represented by the Schiller Institute and the Bürgerrechtsbewegung Solidarität party. LaRouche stood as a presidential candidate in the US eight times between 1976 and 2004. He was jailed in 1989 for conspiracy to commit fraud, a prosecution he claimed was politically motivated.

From the 1970s the movement became associated with the promotion of conspiracy theories, and at times with the use of violence against opponents, the fraudulent use of donations, and antisemitism. There was criticism of its recruitment methods; according to The Sunday Times, recruits were isolated from their families, encouraged to give up their studies, and subjected to intense verbal pressure before being asked to accept the LaRouche worldview. Members said the allegations were misrepresentations, and LaRouche strongly denied the charge of antisemitism.

LaRouche was particularly critical of Britain and of the Tavistock Institute in London, a psychotherapy and social sciences charity that the movement associated with British intelligence. In 1999 a LaRouche publication claimed Britain's Secret Intelligence Service (MI6) was threatening to assassinate LaRouche, probably with backing from the British royal family. Duggan's family came to believe that this worldview affected the movement's perception of Duggan when the conference participants learned that he was a British Jew who, as a child, had attended the Tavistock Clinic for counselling when his parents divorced.

== Duggan's involvement with the movement ==
=== Nouvelle Solidarité ===
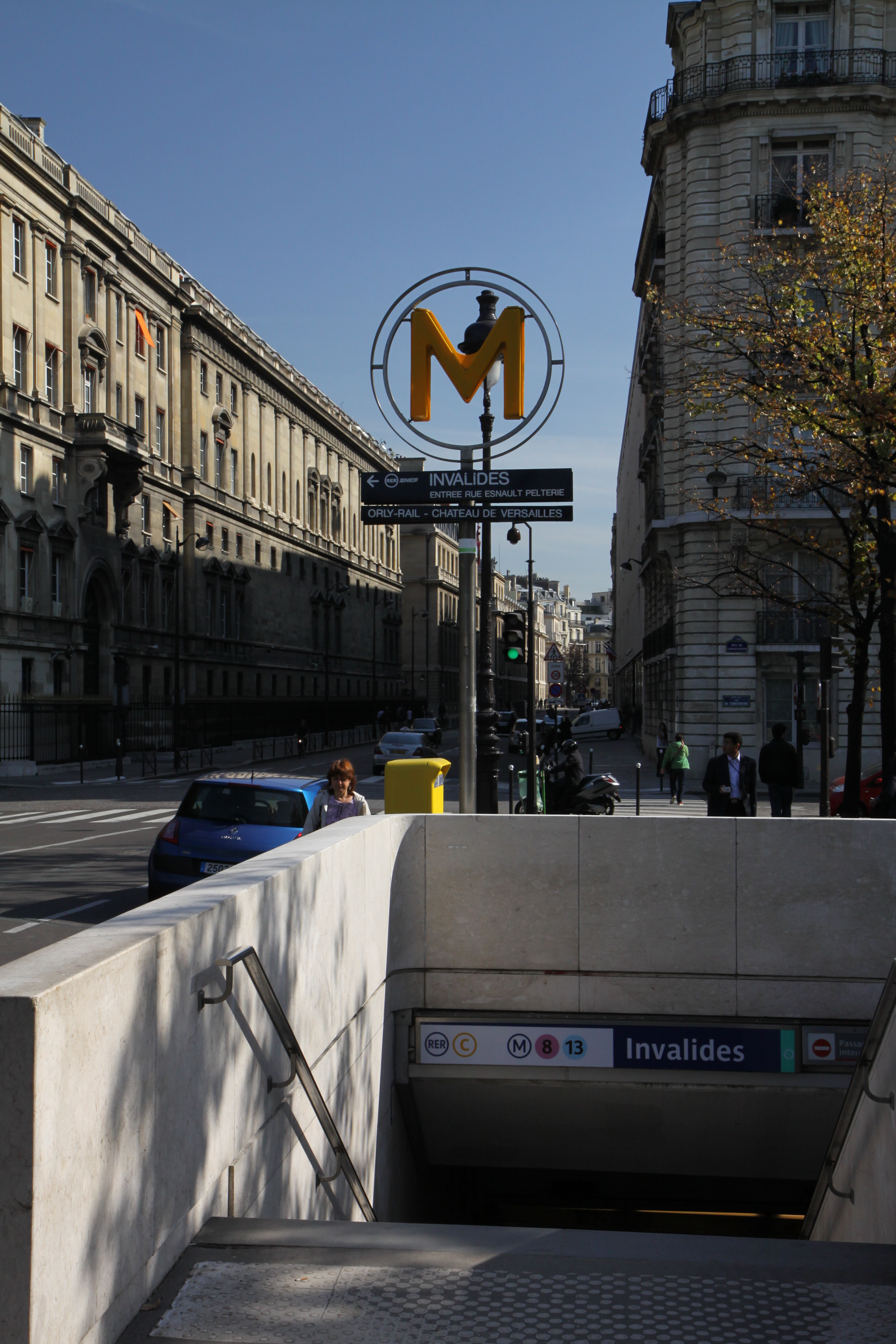
Duggan bought a LaRouche newspaper outside the Invalides station on the Paris Métro.

Duggan's first contact with the LaRouche movement was in Paris in January 2003, when he bought a copy of the LaRouche French-language newspaper, Nouvelle Solidarité, from a booth near the British Institute, outside the Invalides station on the Paris Métro. The man who sold him the paper was Benoit Chalifoux, a writer for the newspaper and one of the movement's "organizers", or recruiters.

Duggan was strongly opposed to the Iraq War, as were Chalifoux and his group of friends from the LaRouche movement. Protests were taking place worldwide in the weeks leading up to the invasion of Iraq on 20 March 2003. Duggan began seeing more of Chalifoux's group and was invited to attend a Schiller Institute conference near Wiesbaden, the LaRouche movement's European headquarters. Duggan and his parents assumed it was an anti-war conference. His mother searched for material about LaRouche on the web in vain; possibly she or her son misspelled the name as "Laroche."

=== Conference ===
Duggan and Chalifoux travelled to Wiesbaden on 21 March with eight other men. Duggan stayed in a youth hostel at first, then with two other recruits in an apartment belonging to two Schiller Institute managers.

The conference, "How to Reconstruct a Bankrupt World," was held in Bad Schwalbach, near Wiesbaden, from 21 to 23 March. LaRouche was the keynote speaker, with a speech entitled "Physical Geometry as Strategy." According to April Witt in The Washington Post, he told the audience that US President George W. Bush was an unreformed drunk (he is a teetotaler), Woodrow Wilson had founded the Ku Klux Klan from the White House, John F. Kennedy was killed by a domestic American operation, and the US was using the war in Iraq to "ignite catastrophic global warfare." The plot to launch a world war was being influenced, he said, by people who "like Hitler, admire Nietzsche, but being Jewish ... couldn't qualify for Nazi Party leadership, even though their fascism was absolutely pure! As extreme as Hitler! They sent them to the United States." The people behind the plot were the "independent central-banking-system crowd, the slime-mold," he said, the same people who had brought Hitler to power in the 1930s.

=== Youth cadre school ===
After the conference, Duggan attended a LaRouche Youth Movement cadre school in Wiesbaden with 60–70 others. Chalifoux, the recruiter who had accompanied him to Germany, returned to Paris. According to another potential recruit, there were hours of lectures, seminars and one-on-one meetings every day, as well as chanting and singing.

Duggan reportedly stood out because he was British and Jewish. A document from the Metropolitan Police, submitted to the first inquest, said the Schiller Institute and LaRouche Youth Movement blamed the Jewish people for the Iraq war and other global issues, and that "Jeremiah's lecture notes and bulletins showed the anti-Semitic nature of [the] ideology." According to Duggan's mother, the Schiller Institute's scientific adviser, Jonathan Tennenbaum, told her that when Duggan heard the Jews being blamed for the war during a seminar, he had stood up and said, "But I'm a Jew!" One participant said the others put him "through the wringer" because of it.

According to Witt, Duggan may have been placed under further pressure because he told the others he had attended the Tavistock Clinic as a child for counselling when his parents divorced. Duggan's conference notes showed that someone at the conference referred to the Tavistock as a "brainwashing" centre.

== Incident ==
=== Visit to Frankfurt ===
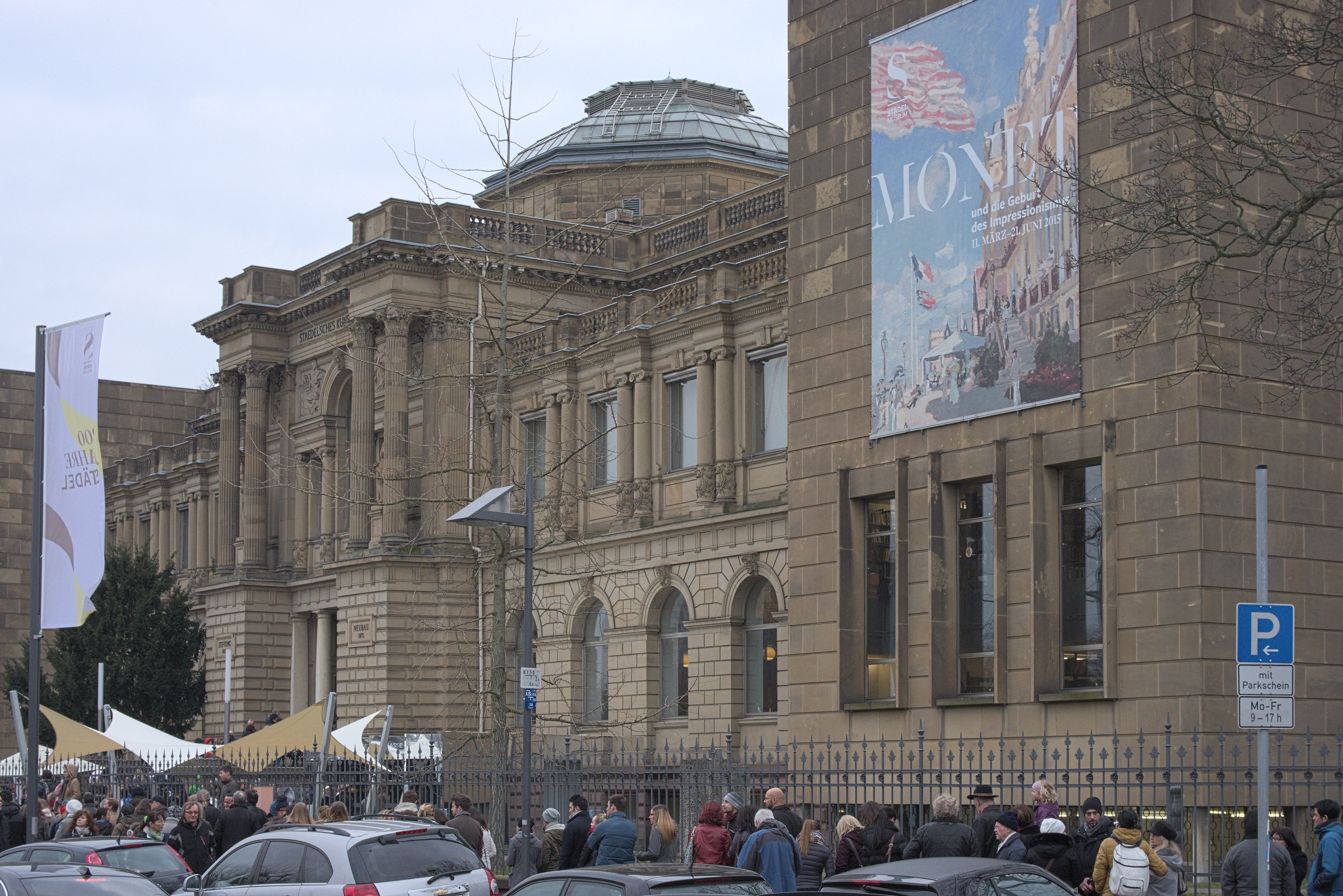
Städel museum, Frankfurt

Duggan and his French girlfriend had planned to meet in Paris on Tuesday, 25 March. Instead he called her that day, two days before his death, to say he had no money for the fare home and was unable to get a ride until Sunday. He told her "very serious things" were happening and that he would explain when he returned.

On 26 March, Duggan accompanied LaRouche members to Frankfurt to hand out LaRouche literature in the streets, then to see the Rembrandt collection at the Städel museum. When one member asked what he thought of the artwork, he started crying. The woman invited him to step outside for some air. Duggan kept repeating that he did not trust LaRouche and said he wanted to go back to England. She told him he was free to leave and could phone her if he wanted to, which seemed to reassure him. She last saw him with one of his roommates sitting on the steps of the museum around 8:30 pm.

=== Duggan's telephone calls ===
One of the Schiller Institute managers in whose apartment Duggan was staying told The Sunday Times that he and his roommate returned to the house around midnight. They had no key so the manager opened the door for them. According to the roommate (speaking after Duggan's death to his girlfriend), Duggan could not sleep and kept switching the lights on and off. He repeated that he was unable to trust LaRouche and felt trapped.

At around 4:20 am—by now Thursday, 27 March—Duggan called his girlfriend on the roommate's mobile phone. She said he was speaking very quietly; sounded agitated and confused; complained that he no longer knew what was true and real; and that someone was conducting experiments with computers and magnetic waves, perhaps on him. She asked him to take a train to Paris in the morning. According to the roommate, Duggan then telephoned his mother, after which he ran out of the house. Mrs. Duggan said the first call came at 5:24 am German time (4:24 am in the UK):

And he said, "Mum, I'm in ... big trouble ... You know this Nouvelle Solidarité?" ... He said, "I can't do this ... I want out." And at that point the phone was cut. And then it rang back again almost immediately. And the first thing that he said that time was, "Mum, I'm frightened." I realised he was in such danger that I said to him, "I love you." And then he said, "I want to see you now." ... I said, "Well, where are you, Jerry?" He said, "Wiesbaden." And I said, "How do you spell it?" And he said, "W-I-E-S." And then the phone was cut.

After the calls, according to the roommate, Duggan asked, "Why did you choose me?" and said he wanted to go out for a cigarette. The roommate went too but pressed a doorbell by accident while looking for the light switch at the bottom of the stairs; he said this appeared to make Duggan panic and he ran off. He said he ran after Duggan briefly before going back to the apartment.

=== Death ===
The fatal collisions were reported at 06:14 am just before the sliproad where the Berliner Strasse becomes Bundesstraße 455. The Peugeot and Golf are parked ahead in the direction of the town centre.

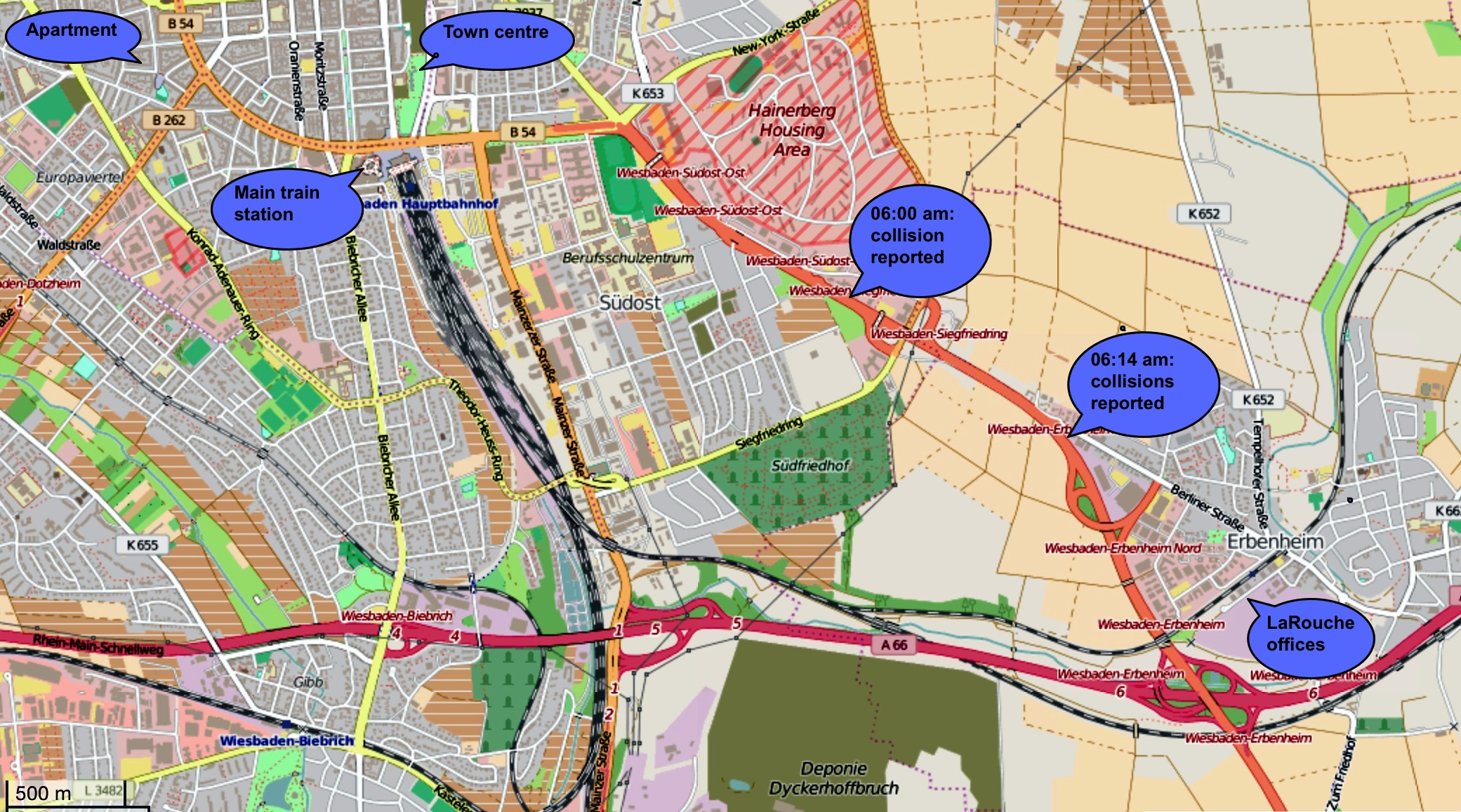
The 06:00 and 06:14 collisions; the apartment (top left) in which Duggan had been staying; and the LaRouche offices (bottom right).

Map of the incident
from the Wiesbaden police perspective

— Wiesbadener Kurier

Just over thirty minutes later, at about 6:00 am, two drivers heading into Wiesbaden town centre saw a man run toward them on the Berliner Straße (Bundesstraße 455), a four-lane dual carriageway. The spot, near an Aral garage, was around five kilometres (c. three miles) from the apartment in which Duggan had been staying, and not far from the LaRouche offices in the Wiesbaden suburb of Erbenheim. One of the drivers said Duggan ran toward him with outstretched arms. The car, a BMW, clipped him with the wing mirror. He appears to have fallen, but got up and continued running toward the traffic that was heading into town. Both drivers reported the incidents to police.

At 6:14 am, as the police were taking details, they were told that a man had run into a red Peugeot further ahead on the same road. The driver saw Duggan move onto the road in front of him. The driver swerved from the inside lane to the outside, but the driver said Duggan leapt in front of the car, arms raised and mouth open. The driver hit him, denting the passenger door and shattering the passenger window and windscreen, and throwing Duggan into the path of a blue Volkswagen Golf, which ran over him. He was certified dead at the scene at 6:35 am.

The view of the German police was that Duggan had arrived at that stretch of road after running 5 km (3 miles) from the apartment. Duggan's family complained that the police had failed to establish that. Other allegations included that he had spent the night at the nearby LaRouche offices and ran from there to the road, and that he had run onto the road from a car. Forensic reports commissioned by Erica Duggan suggested that he may have died elsewhere and been moved onto the road after the fact, a position the coroner rejected in 2015.

=== Early response ===
Within minutes of Duggan's second telephone, Erica contacted the British emergency services and was advised to call her local police station in Colindale, Barnet. She told them she believed her son was in danger. They transferred her to the Metropolitan Police at Scotland Yard, but when she explained he had become involved with Nouvelle Solidarité they had no idea what she meant.

At 7:40 am Duggan's roommate telephoned his girlfriend in Paris to ask if she had heard from him; he said Duggan had left the apartment and had not returned. At around 11 am Erica rang the roommate's mobile phone; because he did not speak English, he passed it to a Schiller Institute manager. The manager reportedly told her the group was a news agency, adding, "We cannot take responsibility for the actions of individuals. We think your son has psychological problems." She said she would call the local hospitals to see whether Duggan had been admitted. Shortly after this, the manager and Duggan's roommate, along with another member, handed his passport, bag and rucksack to the Wiesbaden police station.

The manager told The Independent: "I believed he had psychological problems, based on the conversations he had with people. I don't know what happened on the night he died, but the Schiller Institute played no part in his death." The police report stated that the manager told them Erica had called "since he had severe asthma and was not getting in touch with her." Later Erica said her son had not had asthma since childhood.

According to one of those present, around 25 members of the movement were asked to assemble in the local LaRouche office that morning, in a meeting attended by Helga Zepp-LaRouche. They were told that Duggan had killed himself. A LaRouche recruiter from Paris told the meeting that Duggan had been to the Tavistock Clinic, apparently giving the impression that he had been there recently. Zepp-LaRouche reportedly said that Duggan might have been sent from London to harm LaRouche.

== Inquiries ==
=== First German investigation ===
Wiesbaden police reportedly concluded within three hours that Duggan committed suicide. LaRouche officials were said to have told police that Duggan had been a patient at the Tavistock Clinic and had suffered from "suicidal impulses." That view of him shaped the rest of the inquiry, according to The Sunday Times.

An emergency doctor gave the cause of death as "open, cranio-cerebral trauma following traffic accident," injuries that he said were consistent with the accident as described by the drivers. The accident investigator noted marks on Duggan's clothes consistent with having been in contact with the underside of a vehicle. The braking had left marks on the road; Duggan was lying about 23 metres (25 yards) beyond the point of impact. The investigator took 79 photographs of the scene, although the cars were moved before he arrived.

German authorities did not conduct an autopsy because the cause of death had been established and there was no evidence of foul play. His clothes were not returned to his family and were assumed to have been destroyed. The police took no formal witness statements. Witness evidence was recorded as "brief, sometimes contradictory, notes," according to The Daily Telegraph. Nothing suggested that the drivers had any connection to the LaRouche movement or Duggan. The Wiesbaden public prosecutor closed the case after three months. In 2004 he told the BBC:

We are 100 percent certain that it is suicide, suicide as we call it, that as a consequence of his own behaviour, and with no one else involved, he threw himself in front of a car, of several cars, and died on the third attempt.

Under German law, Arlett said that he could investigate further only if there existed "concrete evidence of third-party involvement," and there was none; the Schiller Institute had been mentioned in connection with the death only because Duggan had attended an event of theirs. Officials maintained the same position in 2007 and 2009.

=== First British inquest ===
Duggan's body was flown back to England on 31 March 2003, where a non-forensic post-mortem examination was conducted on 4 April by pathologist David Shove. Shove found head injuries, bruising on the backs of the arms and hands, blood in the lungs and stomach, and a full bladder. A blood sample showed no drugs or alcohol.

Shove was not called to attend the inquest, which took place in November 2003. Robert Hawthorne, an accident investigator, told the court that Duggan may only have appeared to leap in front of the cars: "The drivers may have perceived that he leapt when in actual fact he was either running to clear the cars or what they saw was the post-impact movement of Jeremiah as he was flung around." The court heard testimony about the conference Duggan had attended. A Metropolitan Police memo was entered as evidence: "The Schiller Institute and the LaRouche Youth Movement ... blames the Jewish people for the Iraq war and all the other problems in the world. Jeremiah's lecture notes and bulletins showed the anti-Semitic nature of [the] ideology." The coroner, Dr. William Dolman, delivered a narrative verdict:

Jeremiah Joseph Duggan received fatal head injuries when he ran into the road in Wiesbaden and was hit by two private motor cars. What other fact do we know that I must add? I really must add that he had earlier been in a state of terror. It is a word not commonly used in a Coroner's court but no other word would reflect his state of mind at the time.

=== Private forensic reviews ===
Erica Duggan set up the "Justice for Jeremiah" campaign in April 2004 with legal support from the British Foreign Office. In 2005 she hand-delivered a list of questions to Shove, the pathologist who had performed the autopsy. When she showed him Duggan's autopsy report, he allegedly replied that Duggan had been "severely beaten around the head" and said he had not realised it had been a traffic accident. Shove declined to sign a statement to that effect and apparently could not be located for the second inquest.

Six forensic experts hired by Erica examined Shove's autopsy report and photographs taken by accident investigators in Wiesbaden. A forensic pathologist suggested that bruises on Duggan's hands and arms were defensive injuries. Paul Canning, a forensic photographer formerly with the Metropolitan Police, and Alan Bayle, a forensic scientist, suggested that Duggan may have died elsewhere and been placed at the scene. Bayle argued that the Peugeot windscreen had been hit with a crowbar or a similar instrument, while Canning wrote that he found nothing to suggest that the cars had made contact with Duggan. Two other forensic experts expressed similar views.

Those views were challenged during a High Court hearing in 2008 regarding the application for a new inquest. Contrary to the claim that there was no sign that Duggan had come into contact with the cars, there were "traces on the underside of the Golf," according to Cecilia Ivimy on behalf of the Attorney General. She described the argument that the accident had been staged as requiring someone to have inflicted head injuries after the phone call to Erica, placed Duggan on the road, inflicted damage to two cars, scattered debris, and created skid marks, all without attracting attention. In 2010 the Federal Constitutional Court of Germany called the allegations outlandish. (Note: "Eine solche Möglichkeit halte der Senat für abwegig.") The Wiesbadener Kurier criticised what it saw as the defamation of "two completely innocent motorists."

=== Second British inquest ===
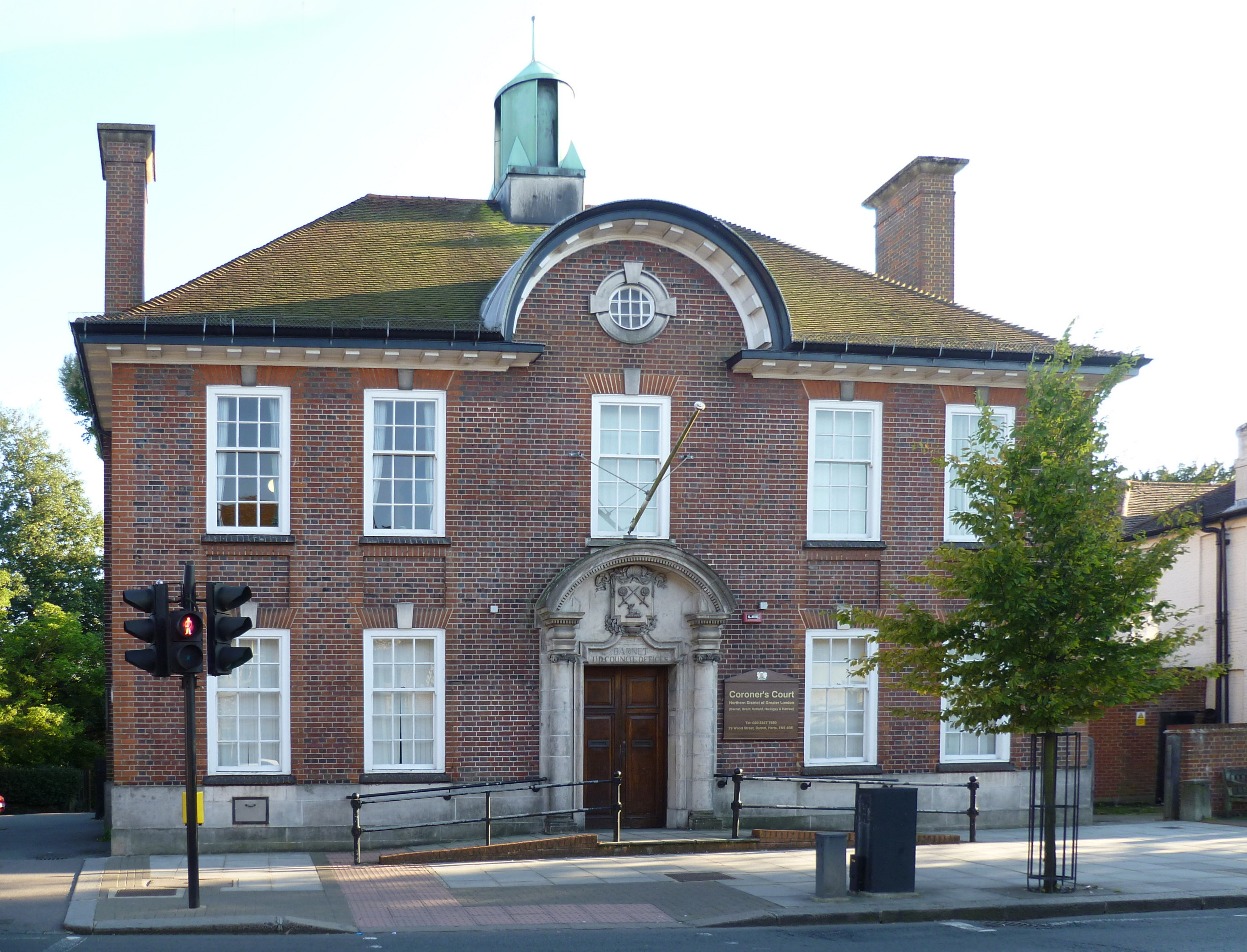
North London Coroner's Court, Barnet

Relying on the forensic reviews, Erica applied in May 2007 for a new inquest. A cross-party group of MPs signed an early day motion that month calling on the Attorney General to support the application. After protracted legal action by Erica, the High Court ordered the new inquest in May 2010.

The inquest took place over three days in May 2015 at North London Coroner's Court before the coroner Andrew Walker. (Note: The German police and witnesses, and LaRouche representatives, did not attend the second inquest. Nor did David Shove, the pathologist who performed the autopsy, apparently because he could not be located.) Walker rejected the view that the accident had been staged, calling it implausible. The court heard from Catherine Picard, a French expert on cults, that Duggan might have experienced "intense pressure and psychological violence" at the conference, including one-on-one sessions, hours of lectures, and "being subjected to repeated conspiracy theories and antisemitic discourse." Matthew Feldman, a historian at Teesside University and expert on the far right, testified that, if other participants had learned that Duggan was Jewish, British and had attended the Tavistock Clinic, "it would have been taken very seriously by the movement." Walker delivered a narrative verdict:

... Jeremiah Duggan received fatal injuries following a collision with two cars on the Berliner Strasse and died in a road traffic collision. ... There are a number of unexplained injuries that suggest that Mr. Duggan may have been involved in an altercation at some stage before his death.

He added that Duggan's attendance at the conference, the methods used to recruit young people, Duggan having expressed that he was a Jew and British, and questioning what he was being told "may have had a bearing on Mr. Duggan's death in the sense that it may have put him at risk from members of the organization and caused Mr. Duggan to become distressed and seek to leave." He said that he "totally reject[ed] that this was a suicide."

=== Second German investigation ===
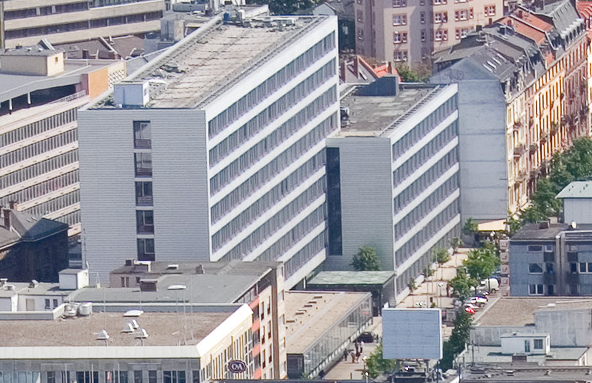
Oberlandesgericht in Frankfurt

Duggan's family appealed unsuccessfully in 2006 to the Higher Regional Court (Oberlandesgericht) in Frankfurt regarding the decision to close the German police investigation. Their appeal against that decision was rejected by Germany's Federal Constitutional Court in 2010. A second appeal to the Oberlandesgericht succeeded in 2012. In what the Berliner Zeitung described as an extremely unusual decision, the court ordered the Wiesbaden prosecutor to re-open the inquiry. The court said that a pedestrian leaving the LaRouche offices in Wiesbaden, in the direction of the town centre, would have reached exactly that junction in the Berliner Straße, and "would have had to cross the four-lane road if he did not want or was unable to turn back."

The new investigation opened in April 2013. As of 2015, prosecutors were reportedly investigating allegations against two individuals, one German, one French, on suspicion of causing bodily harm resulting in death. Erica criticised the appointment of the same police officer who had presided over the case in 2003, accusing the German authorities of "institutional racism" akin to that of the Stephen Lawrence murder inquiry. In 2014 the Board of Deputies of British Jews asked Chancellor Angela Merkel to arrange an independent investigation, and in 2015 asked the British Foreign Secretary to raise the issue with the German government.

== LaRouche response ==
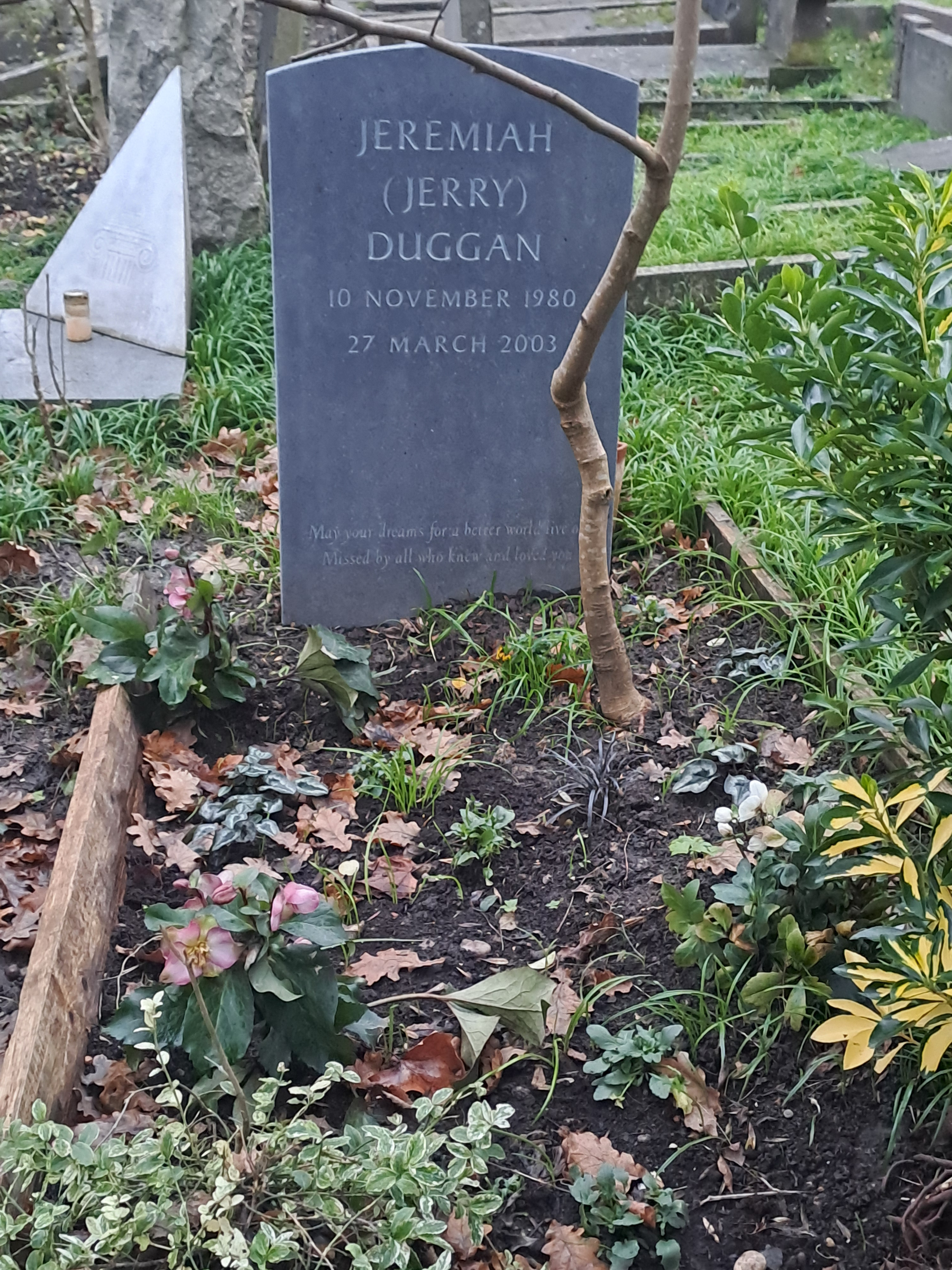
Grave of Jeremiah Duggan in Highgate Cemetery

In 2006 LaRouche issued a statement saying the allegations were a hoax stemming from a campaign orchestrated by Dick Cheney, then Vice President of the United States, and Cheney's wife Lynne. In 2007 the LaRouche movement published a letter from the Metropolitan Police, dated 14 July 2003, that it said was obtained under the British Freedom of Information Act, in which an officer wrote that he had been assured the case had been fully investigated in Germany.

The Schiller Institute issued a statement in 2007: "The Schiller Institute has always maintained that it had no involvement whatsoever in Jeremiah's death, and has expressed its sympathy to the Duggan family." In 2015 a spokesperson told Newsweek that the allegations were "utterly preposterous":

At no time has Ms Duggan ever presented any evidence or facts that refute the findings of the German authorities concerning the suicide of her son. Instead, over the last 12 years she and her representatives and collaborators have propounded wild conspiracies theories [sic] promulgated by the political enemies of Mr LaRouche in and around the British Monarchy and the circles of the now discredited former prime minister Tony Blair.

== See also ==
- List of unsolved deaths
