= Moges Kebede =

Ethiopian essayist, author and editor

Moges Kebede (Amharic: ሞገስ ከበደ), sometimes credited as Moges Kebede Damte or Moges Damte, is an Ethiopian author, essayist, and editor. He is the publisher of Mestawet Ethiopian Newspaper, a monthly magazine for the Ethiopian immigrant community in the United States.

== Life ==
Moges Kebede was born and raised in Addis Ababa, the capital of Ethiopia. After finishing high school, he worked as a freelance writer, contributing articles for private newspapers and magazines and writing plays for local theaters.

In the early 1990s Moges started writing for various citywide Addis Ababa publications. He also participated in the formation of the Ethiopian Free Press Journalists' Association or EFJA. In 1992, Moges published his first book, a crime novel titled Damotra, which he financed himself.

In April 1996, Moges immigrated to Minneapolis, Minnesota, where in April 2001 he established Mestawet Ethiopian Newspaper, the first monthly citywide Amharic language magazine with 150 copies. Though there had been past attempts to publish magazines geared toward the Ethiopian community in the Twin Cities, Mestawet was the first to achieve regular publication and become widely distributed to the area's estimated 15,000 or more immigrants from Ethiopia and Eritrea.

Beginning in 2004, Mestawet expanded its distribution throughout the U.S., reaching readers in Los Angeles, Seattle, Washington, D.C., Dallas, Denver, Atlanta, Columbus, and Portland.

By April 2005, Mestawet’s circulation had increased to 8,000 copies.

== Literary works ==
- Damotra, a novel
