= Frédéric Nérac =

French journalist

- Born: France; 1960
- Disappeared: 22 March 2003 (aged 42–43); Iraq
- Status: Missing for 23 years, 5 months and 20 days, and now declared dead in dead in absentia
- Occupation: journalist
- Spouse: Fabienne Nerac

Frédéric Nérac (1960 – unknown, declared dead 21 October 2005) was a French journalist, reported missing in Iraq since 22 March 2003. On 21 October 2005 he was officially declared dead in absentia, though no body has been found.

== Background ==
Frédéric Nérac was covering the Invasion of Iraq for the UK-based ITN television network as an unembedded journalist, as opposed to journalists "embedded" with US or UK military units.

On 22 March 2003, in Bassora, two ITN vehicles were captured in crossfire between US and Iraqi forces. One of the vehicles, carrying Terry Lloyd and Daniel Demoustier, was destroyed. The second vehicle, carrying Nérac, apparently managed to escape to cover, and disappeared. British forces and French officials investigated the area; US authorities were reported to be unhelpful in the search.

On 21 October 2005, Nérac was declared dead by the French Ministry of Foreign Affairs. In 2006, citing an anonymous diplomatic source, Georges Malbrunot said that he believed that Nérac had been executed by Ba'athists and buried in the Az Zubayr cemetery.

== See also ==
- List of people who disappeared mysteriously (2000–present)
