= William Dolman (coroner) =

British coroner

William "Bill" Dolman (Reverend Doctor) was H.M.Coroner for the Northern District of London from 1993 to 2007. During his career he held over 8000 inquests, including a "suicide by cop", the only such case in English legal history. He is the only Coroner to have been a regular BBC broadcaster, providing medical advice for 25 years to the 6 million regular listeners of the Jimmy Young Show. He founded the Dolman Best Travel Book Award in 2006, the only travel book award in the country (as of its founding), given to the best travel book published during the previous year. He continued to help organize and sponsor the award through 2022.

== See also ==
- Death of Jeremiah Duggan
