= North London Coroner's Court =

Municipal building in London, England

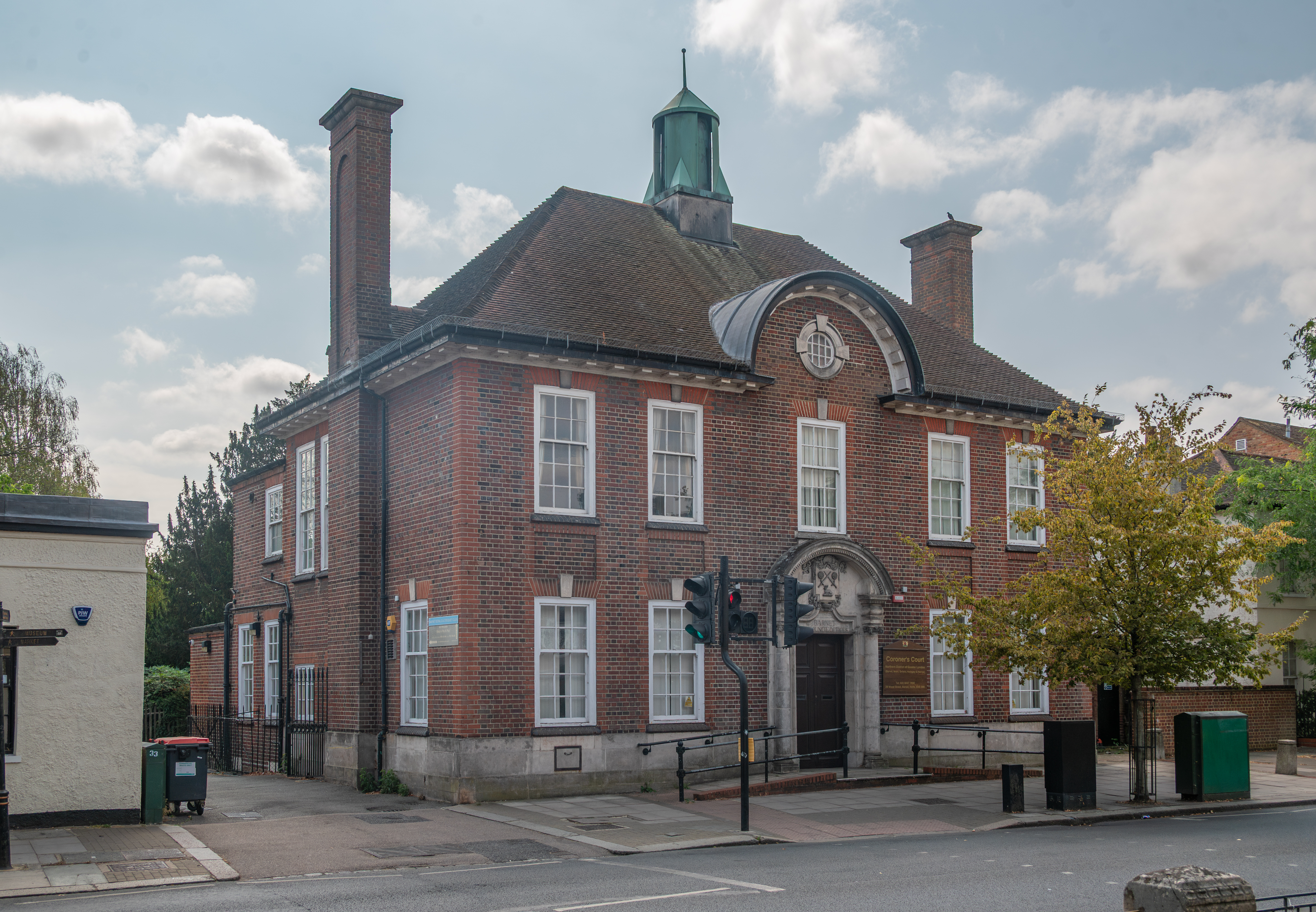
- North London Coroner's Court in 2026

- Shown in Barnet
- 51.652893°N 0.20201°W
- Location: Chipping Barnet

History
- Built: 1915

Site notes
- Architect: William Bartlett Chancellor
- Architectural style: English Baroque style

Listed Building – Grade II
- Designated: 12 September 2006
- Reference no.: 1391752

The North London Coroner's Court is a municipal building located at 29 Wood Street, Chipping Barnet, London. The building, which served as Barnet Town Hall, is a Grade II listed building.

== History ==
In the early 20th century Barnet Urban District Council was based at council offices at No. 40 High Street in Chipping Barnet. After the existing council offices were deemed inadequate for their needs (the building was a narrow terraced building in a row of commercial properties), civic leaders decided to procure purpose-built council offices: the site selected had previously been occupied by the Old Barnet Brewery Company for which liquidation proceedings started in 1909 and were completed in 1912.

The new building, which was designed by William Bartlett Chancellor in the English Baroque style, was completed in 1915. The design involved a symmetrical main frontage with five bays facing onto Wood Street; the central section featured a doorway with a stone surround flanked by Ionic order columns and an arched pediment bearing the town's coat of arms above; there was a window with projecting flagpole on the first floor and semi-circular pediment bearing an oculus above; a turret was erected on the roof. The building was subsequently extended at the rear.

The building continued to be the headquarters of Barnet Urban District Council for much of the 20th century but ceased to be the local seat of government when the London Borough of Barnet was formed in 1965. The building was then used for a variety of purposes including as a location for the television drama series Midsomer Murders broadcast in June 2002. It also served as the home of the Barnet register office until it moved to Burnt Oak in Edgware in around 2008.

After a major programme of refurbishment works costing £275,000, the north London Coroner' Court, which had previously been based at Myddelton Road in Hornsey, moved into the building in October 2009.

== The court ==
The court covers the London boroughs of Barnet, Brent, Enfield, Haringey and Harrow. Notable cases included a hearing in May 2015, when the coroner, Andrew Walker, ruled that the death of Jeremiah Duggan, who had been attending a "youth cadre school" organised by the LaRouche movement was not suicide, and a hearing in September 2015, when relatives of Anni Dewani appeared at the court to request that an inquest be heard in England into her death in South Africa.
