= Mestawet Ethiopian Newspaper =

Mestawet Ethiopian Newspaper is a monthly magazine for the Ethiopian immigrant community in the United States. The newspaper's primary language is the Amharic language, the official language of Ethiopia.

The newspaper is run by volunteers, including editor-in-chief Moges Kebede.

== Circulation ==
It started with 150 copies on April 1, 2001, in the Twin Cities and now distributes 80,000 copies it to audiences nationwide. Cities the newspaper can be found in are Los Angeles, Seattle, Washington DC, Dallas, Denver, Atlanta, Columbus, South Dakota, Minneapolis & Saint Paul and Portland.
