= Andrew Walker (barrister) =

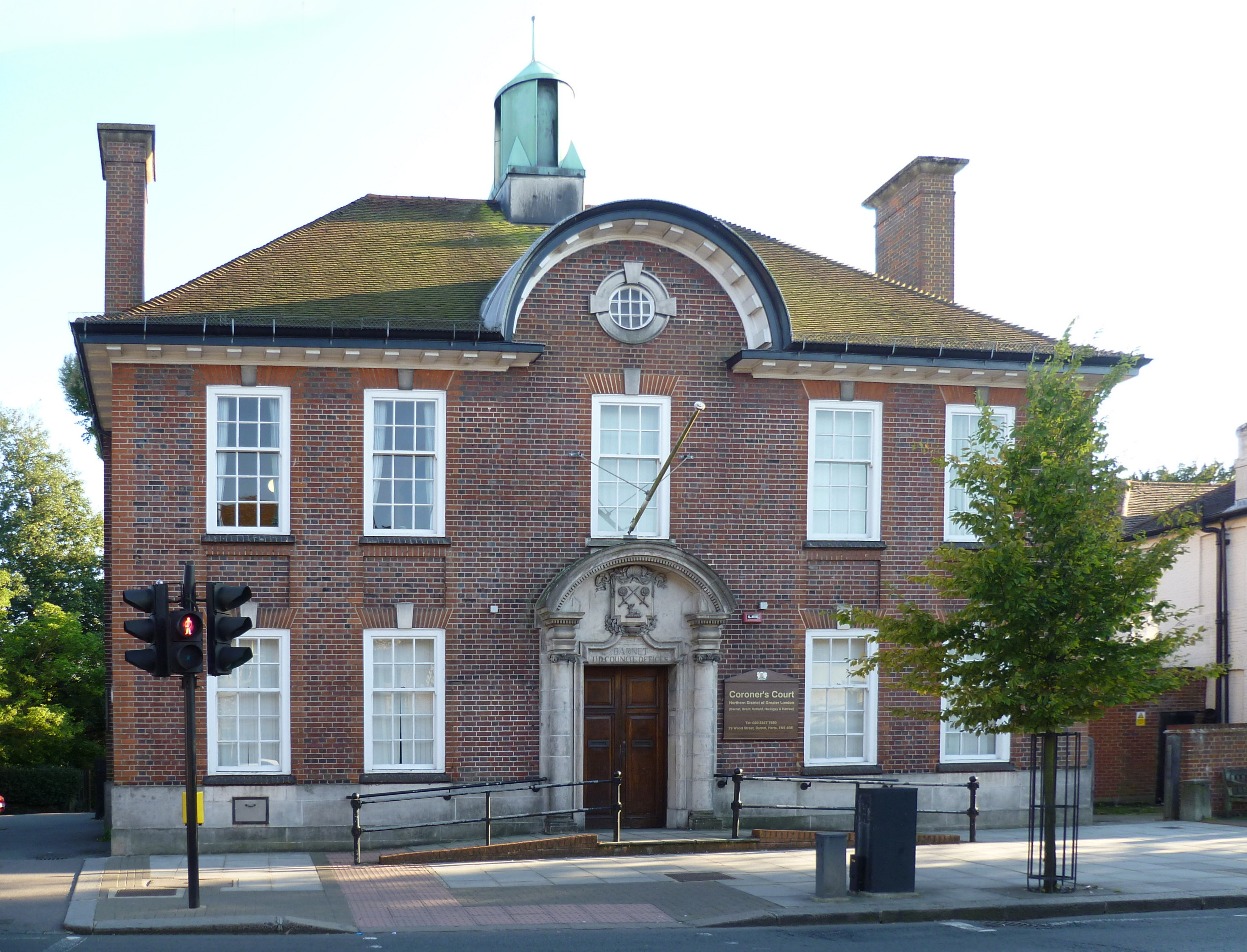
The north London Coroner's Court.

Andrew Walker (born 1963) is an English barrister and coroner for the Northern District of Greater London.

== Coroner ==
In June 2006 he was appointed on temporary contract as assistant deputy coroner in Oxfordshire, one of three temporary appointees to assist in reducing a backlog of inquests into the deaths of British military personnel overseas. Bodies of those servicemen dying overseas are repatriated to the UK via RAF Brize Norton leading to the responsibility for inquests being under the civilian jurisdiction of the Oxfordshire coroner.

Statements made by Walker in a number of high-profile cases have been quoted in the British media.

He has been particularly critical of the actions of the UK Ministry of Defence and United States Department of Defense, particularly with regard to so-called friendly fire incidents. In the case of the death of ITN reporter Terry Lloyd, killed by U.S. forces in southern Iraq in March 2003, Walker recorded a verdict of unlawful killing, the strongest possible judgement in an inquest, calling for the Attorney general and Director of Public Prosecutions to consider criminal charges against the U.S. servicemen involved.

The inquest into the death of British non-commissioned officer, Lance-Corporal of Horse Matty Hull, in a friendly fire incident in 2003 led to significant media interest over the refusal of the US government to release a classified cockpit video recording. The video was leaked to the British media. Walker returned a narrative verdict, stating that the killing of Hull was unlawful. He said: "The attack on the convoy amounted to an assault. It was unlawful because there was no lawful reason for it and in that respect it was criminal."

In the case of the crash of an RAF Nimrod in Afghanistan in 2006, in which 14 servicemen were killed, Walker stated that the evidence heard at the inquest revealed that the entire Nimrod fleet had "never been airworthy from the first time it was released to service".

== Non-military inquests ==
In August 2007, Andrew Walker as deputy coroner sitting at Hornsey North London, ruled that a full inquest into the police killing of Azelle Rodney could not be held due to the large number of redactions in police officers' evidence statements. The redactions were made under the Regulation of Investigatory Powers Act which covers information obtained from covert surveillance including telephone taps and bugs.

At a pre-inquest hearing in June 2012 into the police killing of Mark Duggan, Walker said it was "quite extraordinary" that the Independent Police Complaints Commission refused to provide witness statements. He ordered the material to be disclosed within 28 days.
