= Nosa Igiebor (journalist) =

Nigerian journalist and editor (born 1952)

- Born: 25 December 1952 (age 73)
- Occupation: reporter
- Organisation: Tell (1991–present)
- Known for: dissident reporting, imprisonment
- Spouse: Harit Igiebor
- Awards: CPJ International Press Freedom Award (1993)

Nosa Igiebor (born 25 December 1952) is a Nigerian journalist and editor. In 1993, he won the International Press Freedom Award of the Committee to Protect Journalists for his magazine Tell's coverage of Sani Abacha's military rule.

== Early career ==
After graduating with distinction from the Ghana Institute of Journalism, Igiebor began his career at the Nigerian Television Authority in Edo State, where his last position was as senior news editor. His next employer was the National Concord Group, where he was news editor. He left there to become deputy editor-in-chief for the Nigerian news magazine Newswatch.

In 1991, Igiebor co-founded the independent news magazine Tell and became its editor-in-chief. Like Igiebor, most of Tell's journalists came to the magazine from Newswatch, after its editor Dele Giwa was killed by a letter bomb and its editorial policies became consequently less daring.

Tell published articles critical of the government and military, causing the magazine's relationship with military ruler Ibrahim Babangida to become increasingly strained. In April 1993, when the magazine featured an interview with retired General Olusegun Obasanjo as its cover story, the government confiscated 50,000 copies of Tell and the staff was forced to go into hiding. They continued to publish as a tabloid, however, becoming "the first of Nigeria’s Guerrilla tabloids of contemporary times".

== Tell in the Abacha era ==
On 12 June 1993, Babangida annulled the results of the nation's presidential election after opposition candidate Moshood Kashimawo Olawale Abiola was victorious. General Sani Abacha then seized power in a coup as Nigeria's new president.

From the beginning of Abacha's rule, Tell took a critical tone in its reporting on his government. Igiebor set a policy that the magazine would never refer to Abacha as "head of state", preferring the terms "junta" or "dictator" to describe his rule.

The government responded with a campaign of harassment and imprisonment of the magazine's staff, as well as journalists from other publications, leading the Committee to Protect Journalists to issue a report describing the Nigerian independent press as in "deep crisis". In March 1995, George Mbah, the magazine's assistant editor, was arrested and jailed on a charge of "attempting to stage a military coup", and was sentenced to 25 years' imprisonment by a secret military tribunal.

On 25 December of the same year, as Igiebor was leaving his home in Lagos to go to Tell's office, he was arrested by six State Security Service agents and taken to State Security Service headquarters. Agents also seized 55,000 copies of the Christmas issue of Tell bearing a cover story critical of Abacha. Tell's managing editor, Onome Osifo-Whiskey, went into hiding. The remaining staff released a statement after the arrests, saying that "State terrorism and acts of brutal intimidation will not force us to compromise our belief in freedom, justice and the rule of law."

== Imprisonment ==
Igiebor was put in solitary confinement and denied access to his family, lawyer, and medical care. On 8 January 1996, the Federal High Court in Lagos ordered that Igiebor's wife, Harit Igiebor, should be allowed to visit her husband to give him some needed medication, but when she visited the jail the following day, she was denied access. Later that month, the government announced that Igiebor would be charged under "Decree 2 of 1984 for acts prejudicial to state security".

In February, state security agents confiscated 100,000 copies of Tell, and Igiebor's attorney filed a lawsuit against the federal government for US$1,400,000. The attorney was then himself imprisoned without charge.

The Committee to Protect Journalists launched a letter-writing campaign demanding his release, as did Amnesty International. The latter organisation also designated him a prisoner of conscience. He continued to be held incommunicado for a total of more than six months, until 24 June 1996, when he was released along with six other political detainees.

== Awards and recognition ==
In 1993, the Committee to Protect Journalists presented Igiebor their International Press Freedom Award, "an annual recognition of courageous journalism". Bill Orme, an editor of CPJ, commented: "What distinguished Nosa is that he is still producing and his organisation (Tell) is still reporting the news in a very lively and combative way".

In 1998, Igiebor and the staff of Tell magazine as a whole were awarded the Special Award for Human Rights Journalism Under Threat at the Amnesty International UK Media Awards. The award's notice stated; "Tell has continued to publish throughout the period of Nigerian dictatorship despite intimidation, harassment and the detention without charge or trial of Mr Igiebor and other senior members of the Tell staff."

== Present development ==
Igiebor is now the president of TELL Communications alongside Dele Omotunde and Osifo Whiskey. After the era of the military rule in Nigeria, Igiebor and other journalists in Nigeria are reluctant in the practice of journalism.
