= Mandela: The Living Legend =

2003 BBC documentary

Mandela: The Living Legend is a 2003 BBC documentary on the life of activist Nelson Mandela. It is a two-part documentary created by Dominic Allan with a one-person crew. Writing for The Guardian, Kathryn Flett described the documentary as "reverent and occasionally revealing" but concluded that it "wasn't the most penetrating and wildly insightful documentary ever made". In a review of Mandela: Long Walk to Freedom in Grantland, Wesley Morris described Mandela: The Living Legend as "chillingly patient" and "perfectly narrated by David Dimbleby".
