= 19 Keys =

- Genre: Game show
- Presented by: Richard Bacon
- Theme music composer: Paul Farrer; Rumble Music
- Country of origin: United Kingdom
- Original language: English
- No. of series: 1
- No. of episodes: 20

Production
- Running time: 30 minutes (inc. adverts)
- Production company: Objective Productions

Original release
- Network: Five
- Release: 10 November – 5 December 2003

19 Keys is a British game show that aired on Five. It aired five nights a week from 10 November to 5 December 2003. It was hosted by Richard Bacon.

== Format ==
Four contestants stood within a large, transparent plastic cube, one at each corner. They faced the host, who stood next to a safe and a tray of 19 numbered keys in the center. Only one key would open the safe. Before each contestant was a panel displaying the key numbers.

A cash jackpot was at stake, starting at zero and increasing at a continuous rate of £500 per minute for 15 minutes. If the jackpot reached its maximum of £7,500, it then began to decrease at a rate of £2,500 per minute for the next 3 minutes until it reached zero again. A game could thus last no more than 18 minutes. Once the timer and money counter began to run, they did not stop except during commercial breaks.

Throughout the game, a contestant could eliminate wrong keys from their own panel by answering questions correctly, while a miss would relight them; a relit key would be eliminated again before any new ones. The specific keys to be eliminated/relit were revealed only after an answer had been given. Once a contestant had eliminated a total of seven keys, they received a "Lucky Sevens" bonus that allowed them to relight either two keys on one opponent's panel, or one key each for two opponents. Each contestant knew only how many keys their opponents had eliminated, but not specifically which ones.

Round 1 consisted of quick-fire questions on the buzzer, open to all contestants. In Round 2, the questions came in pairs; the first was open to all, and the contestant who answered it correctly could either attempt the second one or pass it to an opponent. One key was at stake for each question in these two rounds.

In Round 3, each contestant had 30 seconds to answer as many quick-fire questions as possible. On each question, they could choose to play for one (easy), two (medium), or three keys (difficult). Round 4 used pairs of questions as in Round 2. Now, though, the contestant who answered the first one correctly (for one key) could set the difficulty level for the second, which was again open for anyone to answer.

At any time, a contestant could press a red button on their podium. They then had 10 seconds to select a key and try to open the safe with it, with the timer and money counter still running. If successful, they won the entire jackpot; if not, they were eliminated from the game. If the jackpot decreased all the way to zero before the safe was opened, or if all four contestants selected incorrect keys, no one won any money.

A special episode with game show hosts featured Jeremy Beadle, Henry Kelly, Nick Weir and Nicholas Parsons. All four hosts played for charity. Beadle won £6,633 after eliminating all 18 incorrect keys.

== Trivia ==
- The top prize was intended to be £15,000, but was later halved.
- Lucky Sevens were intended to be scrapped, but they did end up making it into the show.
- The perspex cube was never soundproof, and contestants have said it echoed one's voice.
- On the episode aired 11 November 2003, Charles Ingram eliminated 14 keys, yet Paul Daniels eliminated 2. Daniels went for it and won that episode's jackpot.
- Quoting Richard Bacon's time on 19 Keys during a review of Planet Terror in British newspaper The Sunday People.

"THERE comes a time in every celebrated artist's life, dear readers, when they make something absolutely no one likes. And I speak from experience - did you ever see Five's quiz show 19 Keys? Course you didn't, no one did. It was a game show that was almost impossible to follow, let alone enjoy. Buzzers, sirens, a prize fund that would go up or down for no apparent reason - imagine being in a pile-up on the M25 with me in the car screaming general knowledge questions at you. That was 19 Keys."
