= Gaby Rado =

Hungarian-British journalist (1955–2003)

Gaby Rado (17 January 1955, in Budapest – 30 March 2003, in Sulaymaniyah, Iraq) was a Hungarian-British television journalist who died in Iraq during the 2003 invasion.

== Life ==
Gábor András Rado was born in Budapest, Hungary, and emigrated with his family to Britain at the age of eight. He studied at King's College School, Wimbledon, London and Christ's College, Cambridge and began work in journalism at The Kentish Times, a local newspaper.

He then joined BBC Radio Leicester working as a reporter, then moved into television news at Thames News before rejoining the BBC at Television Centre, Shepherds Bush as a producer. He moved to ITN in 1985 as a writer before transferring to ITN's Channel 4 News in 1988.

He was a foreign correspondent at Channel 4 News, serving as Moscow correspondent. He worked in Bosnia during the war there, including Srebrenica, and subsequently covered the trial of Slobodan Milošević, work which won him two of his three Amnesty International awards. He also covered the war in Afghanistan and the status of the Uyghur in western China.

Rado was working in Iraq during the war when he died. He fell from the roof of the Abu Sanaa hotel in Sulaymaniyah, northern Iraq, into the car park below, in an incident apparently unconnected with any military activity. He was given first aid but was pronounced dead at the nearby hospital. Rado's death was preceded by the death of fellow ITN reporter Terry Lloyd in the same month, who was killed after coming under fire from United States forces.

Rado had two children with his first wife, Carol Rado. His middle son died in a swimming accident in 1991. He met his second wife, Desa, whilst on assignment in Serbia.

The Amnesty Media Awards now include a category in memory of Rado, which recognises a journalist who has been covering human rights issues for less than five years.
