= At Home with the Eubanks =

- Genre: Reality
- Starring: Chris Eubank
- Country of origin: United Kingdom
- Original language: English

Production
- Production company: Carlton Television

Original release
- Network: Channel 5
- Release: 2003

At Home With The Eubanks was a short-lived reality show starring British boxer Chris Eubank and his family which was broadcast on Channel Five.
