= James Forlong =

British general in the Indian Army

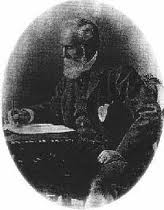
Forlong in an 18th cεntury costume

James George Roche Forlong (6 November 1824 – 29 March 1904) was a Major General of the Indian Army who trained as a civil engineer in Scotland and England. He was renowned for his road-building skills through the jungles of India and Burma and for his studies on comparative religion.

== Life ==
He was born at Springhall in Lanarkshire on 6 November 1824, the third son of William Forlong of Erines and his wife, who was the eldest daughter of General Gordon Cumming Skene of Dyce in Aberdeenshire.

He joined the Indian Army in 1843 and fought in the Mahratha Campaign of 1845-46. He later filled various posts including that of Secretary and Chief Engineer to the government of Oudh. In 1858/59 he travelled extensively in Egypt, Syria and the Middle East.

Exposure to Indian religions while doing missionary work led him to abandon his Christian faith, and into some very heterodox ideas about religious origins, including those of the ancient Hebrews. These found expression in his massive work of comparative religion, Rivers of Life, with its markedly sexual, some would say blasphemous, interpretation of religious rites and symbolism.

He retired from the army in 1876 and then concentrated on writing, mainly on the comparison of various religions. His huge opus "Rivers of Life" was followed by "Faiths of Man: A Cyclopaedia of Religions" which was published posthumously in 1906.

Forlong was a rationalist. He was an Honorary Associate of the Rationalist Press Association, to which he left a sum of money in his will.

He died at home, 11 Douglas Crescent in Edinburgh's West End on 29 March 1904. He is buried in Dean Cemetery in Edinburgh with his wife Lavinia ("Nina") Reddie. The grave lies in the northern Victorian extension attaching the original cemetery on one of the north-south paths.

== Rivers of Life ==
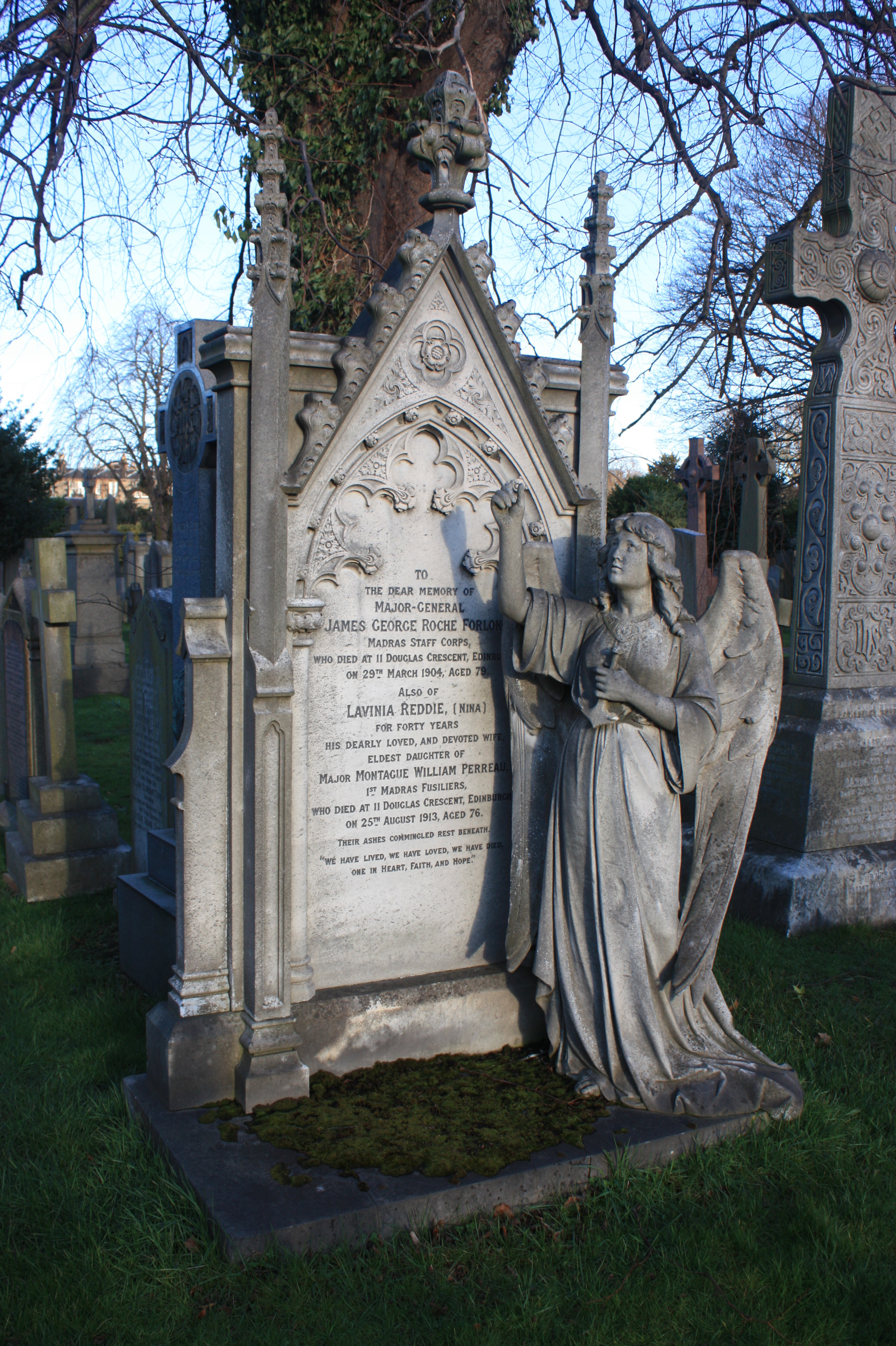
The grave of Major General James Forlong, Dean Cemetery, Edinburgh

"...the shower of phallicism that burst upon the reading public in the shape of General Forlong's Rivers of Life".

The book is in two large volumes together with a huge coloured Chronological Chart of the Religions of the World representing different currents:

- Tree Worship
- Phallic Worship
- Serpent Worship
- Fire Worship
- Sun Worship
- Ancestor Worship

All of these originated very early in mankind's history, and form streams flowing down the millennia and separating and commingling into the major religions.

== Some Themes ==
Like Payne-Knight, D’Hancarville and Hargrave Jennings he is of the phallicist school of religious anthropology. Phallic worship had two wings, the right hand, or lingam and the left hand path of the yoni worshipers,

- The Garden of Eden story was simply that of human generation. Eve bruised the serpent's head and he bruised what is euphemistically called her heel.
- The Ark of the Covenant represented a female sex organ or yoni, and the two stones it contained signified testicles.
- The early Jews practiced a most crude and extreme form of phallic worship. Elohim was the same as Baal and their worship was lingamist, the Yahweh worshiping revolt against it (spearheaded by the prophets) was a pro-yoni movement, like Indian Shaktism.
- Christian churches are constructed on phallic principles. All these ideas are backed up with great erudition and parallels from antiquity, India and the far east.

== Selected publications ==
The Chart

- Rivers of Life (Volume 1, Volume 2, 1883)
- Through what Historical Channels did Buddhism Influence Early Christianity? (Open Court, 1887)
- Short Studies in the Science of Comparative Religions: Embracing All the Religions of Asia (1897)
- Faiths of Man: Cyclopaedia of Religions (3 volumes, 1906)
- Jainism and Buddhism ()

== Quotes ==
- The numerous tales of holy trees groves and gardens repeated everywhere and in every possible form justify me in my belief that Tree Worship was first known and after it came Lingam or Phallic, with of course the female form A-dama.
- He [the Serpent] is the special Phallic symbol which veils the actual God and therefore do we find him the constant early attendant upon Priapus or Lingam, which I regard as the second religion of the world.
- Phallic Worship, the second if not the first of man's faiths.

== James G. R. Forlong Fund ==
The Royal Asiatic Society's James G.R. Forlong Fund derives from his bequest (in a will dated 1901). The fund was registered as a charity in 1962, to be used "for the "encouragement of the study of the religions, history, character, languages and customs of Eastern races" and within this definition to be devoted to the funding of scholarships and the publication of short works on these subjects.

Publications in the James G. Forlong Fund Series include:

- Vol.29 - Corpus of early Tibetan inscriptions, by Hugh Richardson (1985), ISBN 978-09-47-59300-1
- Vol.28 - Study of the spoken Arabic of Baskinta, by Farida Abu-Haidar (1979), ISBN 978-90-04-05948-1
- Vol.27 - Guide to the romanization of Burmese, by John Okell (1971), ISBN 978-90-04-04438-8
- Vol.26 - Two Prakrit versions of the Manipati-Carita, by Williams (1959), ISBN 978-90-04-04436-4
- Vol.25 - A Bibliography of Arms and Armour in Islam, by Keppel Archibald Cameron (1956)
- Vol.24 - Siva-Nana Bodham : a manual of Saiva religious doctrine, by Meykaṇṭatēvar, translated from the Tamil with synopsis exposition by Gordon Matthews (1948)
- Vol.23 - Muslim Theology, by Arthur Stanley Tritton (1947)
- Vol.22 - Sharaf al-Zamān Ṭāhir Marvazī on China, the Turks, and India, by Sharaf al-Zamān Ṭāhir Marwazī, tr. and commentary by Vladimir Minorsky (1942)
- Vol.21 - Sogdica, by Walter Bruno Henning (1940)
- Vol.20 - A Translation of the Kharosthi Documents from Chinese Turkestan, by Thomas Burrow (1940)
- Vol.19 - A Dictionary of the Language of Bugotu, Santa Isabel Island, Solomon Islands, by Walter George Ivens (1940)
- Vol.18 - Marriage in Early Islam, by Gertrude Henrietta Stern (1939)
- Vol.17 - Three Persian Dialects, by Ann Katharine Swynford Lambton (1938)
- Vol.16 - The Pronunciation of Kashmiri, by Thomas Grahame Bailey (1937)
- Vol.15 - Balti Grammar, by Alfred Frank Charles Read (1934)
- Vol.14 - Study of the Gujarati language in the 16th century, by Trimbaklal Nandikeshwar Dave (1935), ISBN 978-90-04-04434-0
- Vol.13 - An Introduction to Colloquial Bengali, by Walter Sutton Page (1934)
- Vol.12 - The Phonetic System of Ancient Japanese, by Saburo Yoshitake (1934)
- Vol.11 - Dialogues in the Eastern Turki dialect on subjects of interest to travellers, by Ross (1934), ISBN 978-90-04-04432-6
- Vol.10 - Ta'rikh-i-Jahan-gushay of Juwayni (vol.3), by Wahid-ul-Mulk, intro by Edward Denison Ross (1931)
- Vol.9 - Diwan, by Falaki-i Shirwani (1929), ISBN 978-90-04-04430-2
- Vol.8 - The Elements of Japanese Writing, by Noel Everard Isemonger (1929)
- Vol.7 - Critical studies in the phonetic observations of Indian grammarians (1929)
- Vol.6 - Falakī-i-Shirwānī: his times, life, and works, by Hasan Hādī (1929), ISBN 978-90-04-04429-6
- Vol.5 - The Milindapañho: being dialogues between King Milinda and the Buddhist sage Nāgasena. The Pali text, ed. Vilhelm Trenckner, index by C.J. Rylands ... and an index of Gāthās by Caroline A.F. Rhys Davids (1928)
- Vol.4 - Taʾríkh-i Fakhruʾd d-Dín Mubáraksháh : being the historical introduction to the Book of Genealogies of Fakhruʾd-Dín Mubáraksháh Marvar-rúdí, completed in A.D. 1206 / edited from a unique manuscript by E. Denison Ross, by Fakhr ul-Dīn Mubārakshāh (1927)
- Vol.3 - Moslem Architecture, 623 to 1516. Some causes and consequences, by Ernest Tatham Richmond (1926)
- Vol.2 - The Arab Conquests in Central Asia, by Hamilton Alexander Rosskeen Gibb (1923)
- Vol.1 - The Primitive Culture of India, by Thomas Callan Hodson (1922)
