= Ethiopian Free Press Journalists' Association =

Free press organization in Ethiopia

The Ethiopian Free Press Journalists' Association (EFJA) is a non-profit, non-governmental organization that seeks to organize Ethiopian journalists and protect press freedoms in Ethiopia. It was formed in 1993, a year after non-state controlled media was legalized in Ethiopia. In 2005 the organization was suspended by the government, its offices raided and members intimidated, leading most to go into exile.

EFJA is a member of the International Freedom of Expression Exchange, a global network of more than 70 non-governmental organisations that monitors free expression violations around the world and defends journalists, writers and others who are persecuted for exercising their right to freedom of expression.
