= Amnesty International UK Media Awards =

Human rights journalism awards

The Amnesty International Media Awards are a unique set of awards which pay tribute to the best human rights journalism in the UK. Kate Allen, Amnesty International UK's director, said that the awards recognize the "pivotal role of the UK media industry in informing and shaping public opinion" and pays tribute to their "often dangerous work". The awards acknowledge the creativity, skills and sheer determination that it takes to get the news out in an educational and engaging way.

In particular, these awards highlight the unique relationship that exists between Amnesty International and the media. Sir Trevor McDonald explained the inextricably linked nature of this relationship: "Amnesty persists where journalism leaves off. We visit these scenes and then move on. Amnesty has the virtue of sticking with the story and making sure the truth comes out."^{[3]}

== History ==
Amnesty International has always championed the importance of media in exposing human rights abuses. Amnesty itself began as a media story. In 1961, Peter Benenson, the founder of Amnesty, was so enraged that two Portuguese students were jailed for seven years for toasting to freedom during the autocratic regime of António de Oliveira Salazar, that he wrote a letter to The Observer.

His "Appeal for Amnesty" letter called for the release of six political prisoners from around the world. It began: "Open your newspapers – any day of the week – and you will find a report from somewhere in the world of someone being imprisoned, tortured or executed because his opinions or religion are unacceptable to his government. The newspaper readers feel a sickening sense of impotence. Yet if these feelings of disgust all over the world could be united into common action, something effective could be done"

Amnesty began with a sentiment expressed through the media and to celebrate the unique relationship Amnesty shares with the media industry, the Amnesty International UK Media Awards were launched in 1992.

== Purpose of the awards ==
Amnesty believes that by recognising excellence in human rights journalism, journalists and commissioners will be encouraged to increase the quality and quantity of their human rights coverage. Good quality media coverage is important as highlighted by Aung San Suu Kyi, Burmese pro-democracy leader, at the 2011 awards ceremony because it is "through the media that the rest of the world gets to hear about what we have to undergo".^{[53]}

In addition to honoring journalists, Lindsey Hilsum, the Channel 4 News International Editor who was the host of the 2014 awards, emphasizes that the Amnesty Awards play a very important role in encouraging editors to allow journalists to cover more obscure stories that are far away and expensive. She said that when: "you point out that you won an Amnesty Award for a similar story a couple of years ago. It makes editors think that they will get some sort of kudos from this, and that it matters within the industry. So I think it’s tremendously important and I think Amnesty is doing a tremendous job by giving us these awards so that we can use them to say: 'Yes, we’ve got to carry on reporting human rights, it really matters'."^{[54]}

However, more specifically as pointed out by Amy Mackinnon, 2012 winner of the student award and a current journalist: "The Amnesty International UK awards are a heartening reminder that, in the right hands, journalism can be a potent force for good."^{[50]}

== Awards ==
=== Categories ===
Categories for the 2013 awards were:

- TV News
- Digital
- Photojournalism
- National Newspapers
- Radio
- Nations & Regions
- Gaby Rado Memorial Award
- Documentaries
- Student Human Rights Reporter

=== Gaby Rado Memorial Award ===
The Gaby Rado Memorial Award, first awarded in May 2004, recognizes a journalist who has been covering national or international human rights stories in broadcast or print media for less than five years.

The award was established with the help of the family, friends and colleagues of the journalist Gaby Rado, who was found dead in Iraq in 2003. He had been the recipient of three Amnesty Media Awards: in 1996 for a series of reports on Bosnia/Srebrenica, 1998 for coverage of the Muslim minority Uighurs in north-western China and 2002 for his "moving account of the human cost of the atrocities committed in the Balkan Wars".

=== Student Human Rights Reporter Award ===
The Student Human Rights Reporter Award was started in 2010 and first awarded in 2011. Initially the award was run with The NUS (National Union of Students) and The Mirror newspaper. The award is now run in conjunction with the NUS, and The Observer.

The award is open to students in further and higher education, with the prize allowing them to work with sponsors to develop real-world reporting and writing experience for two weeks. In 2013 the top prize was a fellowship with the US-based Pulitzer Center for Crisis Reporting and a $2,000 travel grant to cover an under-reported topic of ones choice.

== Entry criteria ==
Each year there is a call for submissions focusing on the areas of human rights work encompassed by Amnesty's mission, which is "to protect individuals wherever justice, fairness, freedom and truth are denied".

Entries must have been originally published or broadcast in the year preceding the closing deadline. There is an entry fee to help Amnesty cover the cost of administering the awards. The full criteria are available in the Media Awards section of the Amnesty International UK website, and are detailed on the entry form sent out each year around four months before the ceremony.

== The ceremony ==
The ceremony is held annually in central London and is attended by around 400 guests, including politicians, celebrities, and prominent figures in the UK media industry. The host, usually a high-profile member of the UK media, conducts the ceremony and the various awards are presented by representatives from each of the judging panels. Past hosts have included journalist and broadcaster Nick Clarke, journalist and news reader Moira Stuart, international editor of Channel 4 News Lindsey Hilsum and the BBC's Lyse Doucet. The host for the 2015 awards was the British radio and television presenter and journalist Anita Anand. Celebrity guests presenting awards have included Bob Geldof, who presented the Special Award for "Human Rights Journalism Under Threat" 2004,^{[104]} won by Kifle Mulat, head of the Ethiopian Free Press Journalists' Association.^{[105]}
