= Terry Lloyd =

English television journalist (1952–2003)

- Born: Terence Ellis Lloyd; 21 November 1952; Derby, England
- Died: 22 March 2003 (aged 50); Basra Governorate, Iraq
- Occupation: Journalist
- Years active: 1983-2003

Terence Ellis "Terry" Lloyd (21 November 1952 – 22 March 2003) was an English television journalist who reported extensively from the Middle East. He was killed by the U.S. military while covering the 2003 invasion of Iraq for ITN. An inquest jury in the United Kingdom before Assistant Deputy Coroner Andrew Walker returned a verdict of unlawful killing on 13 October 2006 following an eight-day hearing.

== Early life and education ==
Lloyd was born in Derby, Derbyshire, where he worked for Raymonds News Agency, and later moved to become a regional TV reporter for ATV/Central Television. He joined ITN in 1983. His Welsh-born father, Ellis Aled Lloyd, was a police officer who was killed in an accident while answering an emergency call aged 46 in 1970. He was the brother of the television actor Kevin Lloyd, and uncle of James Lloyd, also an actor.

== Career ==
In 1988, Lloyd broke the news that Saddam Hussein had used chemical weapons in an attack in Halabja, killing 5,000 Kurds. In 1999, he became the first foreign journalist to enter Kosovo.

== Death ==
Lloyd was killed on 22 March 2003 while covering the 2003 invasion of Iraq for ITN. Working as an independent reporter not embedded with coalition forces, Lloyd and his team of two cameramen and an interpreter were caught in crossfire during fighting near the Shatt Al Basra Bridge in Basra, Iraq, between U.S. and Iraqi forces. His body and that of his Lebanese interpreter, Hussein Osman, were recovered, and it was later established they had both been shot by U.S. forces on the road to Basra. French cameraman Frédéric Nérac is still officially classed as missing, presumed dead. Belgian cameraman Daniel Demoustier survived. Lloyd's funeral was reported on ITN news bulletins by Mark Austin on ITV and Samira Ahmed on Channel 4. At a 29 July 2003 'Embedded Journalist' symposium in Washington, D.C., journalist John Donvan said he had seen Lloyd in the town of Safwan two hours before he was killed. Donvan also added that his ABC news team ripped "the duct tape off the car … the tape that spelled out in eight-inch letters—TV", suggesting that both sides of the conflict were targeting independent reporting.

== Investigation ==
The Royal Military Police (RMP) carried out an investigation into the incident. Major Kay Roberts, an RMP investigator, testified at Lloyd's inquest that a videotape of the incident, taken by a cameraman attached to the U.S. unit that killed him, had been edited before it had been passed on to the British investigation. The RMP forensics expert who examined the tape concluded that about 15 minutes had been removed from the start of the recording. Roberts testified at the inquest that she was sent the tape "some months" after the incident and that she was told by U.S. authorities that the footage they handed over was "everything that they had".

The ITN team were driving in two cars both clearly marked as press vehicles. Frédéric Nérac and Hussein Osman were in the car behind Lloyd and Daniel Demoustier. They encountered an Iraqi convoy at the Shatt Al Basra Bridge in Basra, Iraq. Nérac and Osman were taken out of their car and made to get into an Iraqi vehicle. The British investigation into the incident established the convoy was escorting a Baath Party leader to Basra. American forces shot at the Iraqi convoy, killing Osman: Nérac's body has not been recovered, but the investigation found that he was unlikely to have survived. Frédéric Nérac's wife Fabienne Mercier-Nérac testified that she had received a letter from U.S. authorities who denied being at the scene when the ITN News team was attacked.

Demoustier and Lloyd, still in the ITN car, were caught in crossfire between the Iraqi Republican Guard and American forces. Lloyd was hit by an Iraqi bullet, an injury from which he could have recovered. He was put into a civilian minibus that had stopped to pick up casualties. Forensic evidence presented at the inquest shows U.S. forces shot at the minibus after it had turned to leave the area, killing Lloyd outright. Demoustier survived.

== Inquest ==
The inquest on Lloyd's death was held in October 2006 in Oxfordshire, and lasted eight days, recording the verdict on 13 October 2006. The Assistant Deputy Coroner, Andrew Walker, recorded a verdict of unlawful killing by the U.S. military, and announced he would write to the Director of Public Prosecutions asking for him to investigate the possibility of bringing charges.

Andrew Walker formally cleared ITN of any blame for Lloyd's death, and said that in his view the U.S. tanks had been first to open fire on the ITN crew's two vehicles. However, in the same document, he says he "was unable to determine whether the bullets that killed Lloyd in southern Iraq on 22 March 2003, were fired by U.S. ground forces or helicopters." Lloyd "would probably have survived the first [Iraqi] bullet wound" but was killed as he was being carried away from the fighting in the civilian minibus. Walker said: "If the vehicle was perceived as a threat, it would have been fired on before it did a U-turn. This would have resulted in damage to the front of the vehicle. I have no doubt it was the fact that the vehicle stopped to pick up survivors that prompted the Americans to fire on that vehicle." The National Union of Journalists said Lloyd's killing was a war crime.

On 25 October 2006, Liberal Democrats leader Sir Menzies Campbell raised the matter at Prime Minister's Questions (PMQs), asking "When may we expect the Attorney-General to make an application for the extradition and trial in Britain of those American soldiers against whom there is a prima facie case for the unlawful killing in Iraq of the ITN journalist Terry Lloyd?"

On 19 March 2007, BBC reported that ITN had released the names of the 16 U.S. Marines in the unit involved in Lloyd's death. Despite the inquest verdict of unlawful killing, the Crown Prosecution Service decided in July 2008 that there was "insufficient evidence" to prosecute Lloyd's killers.
