= Wendy Wason =

Scottish writer, comedian and actress

Wendy Wason is a South African-born British writer, comedian and actress from Scotland.

== Career ==
Wason reached the grand final of the Babycham Funny Women competition at The Comedy Store (London) in 2005.

In 2008 Wason appeared on Last Comic Standing and she did her first Edinburgh Fringe Festival hour long show called Things I didn’t know.

At the 2011 Edinburgh Festival Wason did two shows whilst nine months pregnant, performing at The Stand Comedy Club in her own one-woman show, and at the Gilded Balloon in the show Looser Woman with Karen Dunbar. In 2012 Wason performed at the New York Comedy Festival. Wason returned to the Edinburgh Festival again in 2016 with her show Tiny Me.

Wason has written and starred in her own sitcom for BBC Scotland called Half My Age Plus Seven broadcast in October 2014. Wason was a regular on Broken News. Other TV acting credits include Midsomer Murders, Sherlock, Coupling, Channel 4 sitcom The IT Crowd, Tittybangbang, and Doctors.

Alongside Mackenzie Crook Wason voiced the audiobook of Charlotte Street written by Danny Wallace (humorist). Wason has written a regular column for The Huffington Post.

Wason has been a guest on The Comedian's Comedian with Stuart Goldsmith. Wason has been a guest on the BBC Radio Scotland programmes Breaking the News and The Good, the Bad and the Unexpected.

== Personal life ==
Wason was born in Durban in South Africa and lived there until she was three years old before moving to the United Kingdom, where she settled with her family in Edinburgh, Scotland. At five her parents got divorced. Wason worked as a teenager at the Gilded Balloon Box Office in Edinburgh, where she later performed. Wason has three children and lives in North London with husband Stephen Hagan.

Wason supports the charity Integrated Education. She performed alongside comedians Ed Byrne, Gráinne Maguire and Carl Donnelly at the London Irish Centre on 2 November 2018 to raise funds for the Integrated Education Fund in Northern Ireland.
