= Dear Green Place =

- Genre: Sitcom
- Created by: Paul Riley
- Written by: Paul Riley; Ford Kiernan; Mark Cox; Rab Christie
- Directed by: Paul Riley
- Starring: Ford Kiernan; Paul Riley; Jenny Ryan; Carmen Pieraccini; Michael McKenzie
- Country of origin: Scotland
- Original languages: English, Scots
- No. of series: 2
- No. of episodes: 12

Production
- Producer: Effingee Productions for BBC Scotland
- Camera setup: Multi-camera
- Running time: 30 mins

Original release
- Network: BBC One Scotland
- Release: 19 October 2007 – 5 December 2008

Dear Green Place is a Scottish comedy programme set in a park in central Glasgow. It first aired on 19 October 2007 on BBC One Scotland. The second series finished airing on 5 December 2008.

The show was created by comedy actor Paul Riley, and features Ford Kiernan, both of whom featured in the sketch show Chewin' the Fat, and its successful sitcom spin-off Still Game.

It was announced in April 2009 that BBC Scotland would not be commissioning a third series due to poor viewing figures and also having commissioned a new series of Rab C. Nesbitt and Ford Kiernan's new sitcom Happy Hollidays.

== Cast ==
- Archie Henderson – played by Ford Kiernan
- Riordan – played by Paul Riley
- Peter McAllister – played by Paul Blair
- Woody – played by Johnny Austin
- Wallace – played by Martin Docherty
- Michelle – played by Jenny Ryan
- Tina – played by Carmen Pieraccini
- Toner – played by Michael MacKenzie
- Gavin – played by Gavin Jon Wright

== Episodes ==
=== Series 1 ===
1. "Rocksalt": Some of the dopier lads get a crash course in rock salt, while boss Henderson takes a horse for an eventful walk.
2. "Sorry": McAllister accidentally reveals his secret relationship with Michelle and must find a way of making it up to her. Meanwhile, Henderson suffers an allergic reaction.
3. "Pish": Woody and Wallace are set to fail a mandatory drugs test until Wallace's granny provides the solution. McAllister invents a bogus girlfriend to make Michelle jealous.
4. "There's Been A Murder": Henderson and Toner are on the trail of a swan murderer. Riordan queues against his will for concert tickets.
5. "Gimme Shelter": Riordan and Michelle find some air raid shelters in the park while Woody and Wallace are on night shift at the museum.
6. "Bandstand": An eco-warrior chains himself to a bandstand threatened with demolition.

=== Series 2 ===
1. "Beetlemania": A beetle infestation threatens the park, while pheromones mean that love is in the air.
2. "Uppers and Downers": Woody and Wallace uncover a time capsule, and an insomniac Nazi tries to get some sleep.
3. "Goats": Woody and Wallace have to look after cashmere goats and they attempt to sell the cashmere whilst Archie's wife Alice is locked out of the house and needs his help.
4. "Waiting for Smeato": As Tina's cafe approaches its grand re-opening, everyone is wondering who the mystery guest is.
5. "Industrial Daftness": The parkies imitate deafness in order to get a payout from the doctors and Archie has a conflict with the bowling club over a 20 mph zone sign which causes one of the members to get run over.
6. "Puppy Love": Tina installs a new tanning booth in the cafe and Peter & Michelle are on the hunt for a new pet dog.

== Reception ==
The series received some negative criticism. A review in The Scotsman criticised the characters accents for being difficult to follow, but "There were plenty of laughs, great comic timing".

== DVD release ==
- Series 1 DVD was released in December 2007.
- Series 2 DVD was released in December 2008.
