= Knots Untie =

- The Walking Dead episode
- Following Negan's orders, Ethan stabs Gregory to deliver a message to him.
- Episode no.: Season 6 Episode 11
- Directed by: Michael E. Satrazemis
- Written by: Matthew Negrete; Channing Powell
- Cinematography by: Stephen Campbell
- Editing by: Rachel Goodlett Katz
- Original air date: February 28, 2016
- Running time: 43 minutes

Guest appearances
- Xander Berkeley as Gregory; Merritt Wever as Dr. Denise Cloyd; Tom Payne as Paul "Jesus" Rovia; Karen Ceesay as Bertie; James Chen as Kal; Brent Gentile as Freddie; R. Keith Harris as Dr. Harlan Carson; Justin Kucsulain as Ethan; Kimberly Leemans as Crystal; Jeremy Palko as Andy; Ilan Srulovich as Wesley; Peter Zimmerman as Eduardo

Episode chronology
← Previous "The Next World"	Next → "Not Tomorrow Yet"
- The Walking Dead season 6

"Knots Untie" is the eleventh episode of the sixth season of the post-apocalyptic horror television series The Walking Dead, which aired on AMC on February 28, 2016. The episode was written by Matthew Negrete and Channing Powell, and directed by Michael E. Satrazemis.

The Hilltop Colony is introduced in this episode, as well as many characters from the comic books, most notably Gregory, who is played by Xander Berkeley.

== Plot ==
Abraham is seen chatting amiably with Sasha as they return from a foot patrol, but is disappointed to learn that Sasha has been reassigned and they awkwardly part ways. After having sex with Rosita, she gives him a medallion she made from the fuel truck's cracked taillight. Abraham says Rosita is "damned near perfection."

Maggie is working in the dark, building trellises for a vegetable garden she hopes will supplement their depleted rations. She still has not seen a single bud, but her husband Glenn assures her they'll be okay. They notice Denise and Abraham acting anxious about something and run to investigate.

In Rick Grimes' home, Paul "Jesus" Rovia finds himself facing the gun-barrels of Carl, Daryl, Glenn, Maggie, and Abraham, who all get their first look at Rick and Michonne as a couple. Jesus calmly explains that "knots untie, locks get picked, entropy comes from order," suggestive of a philosophy that seeks harmony over control. Jesus reveals that while he was loose, he took account of the Alexandrians' armory and provisions, assessing their food supplies to be very low for his estimate of their population. Jesus apologizes for getting off to a bad start but says they're on the same side, "the living side," and reveals he's from a community much like theirs, where part of his job is to search for other settlements with which to trade. He invites Rick and others to visit and see for themselves.

As Rick's group prep the RV for the trip, Denise gives Daryl some oat-cakes as thanks for his previous efforts. Carl tells Rick that he accepts Rick and Michonne's relationship, and turns down an invitation to go with them, joking that he would not make a good impression with his messed-up face. After heading out, Abraham quietly asks Glenn whether Maggie's pregnancy was intentional or not, to which Glenn explains that he and Maggie are trying to build something, and that they all are. On the way, they see a vehicle smoking as a result of a wreck. Jesus says it's his people, and Rick's group tracks them to a nearby building and rescues them from walkers. Among the rescued are obstetrician Harlan Carson (R. Keith Harris), who offers his services to aid in Maggie's pregnancy in return.

The group arrives at "The Hilltop Colony", a community built around Barrington House, a plantation taken over by the state as a living history museum. A stockade was built with telephone poles from a nearby supply depot and other survivors brought trailers with them from a FEMA camp. They are raising livestock and growing crops, successfully supporting their growing population. One of the guards at the gate demands that Rick's group surrenders their weapons before entering, however Jesus is able to convince them to allow Rick's group to remain armed. He confides to Rick that the Hilltop ran out of ammunition months ago; Rick signals his people to stand down and they are admitted inside.

They are introduced to Gregory (Xander Berkeley), the leader and former businessman on the Chamber of Commerce. Rick ominously says he should not talk to Gregory and tells Maggie to conduct trade talks. Gregory immediately belittles Maggie and asserts that the Alexandrians are in great need and attempts to use their food shortage as leverage. Later, Rick says that they came all this way for food and they're going to get it, but Jesus calls for patience as he works to convince Gregory that it'd be better to show some goodwill to Alexandria and build a relationship that could pay back in the future.

Three of Hilltop's traders arrive and angrily confront Gregory. They had been sent to deliver tribute to Negan who said that it was "light" and killed two people while keeping one hostage, Craig. For Craig's release, his brother, Ethan, delivers a message from Negan by stabbing Gregory in the gut. Rick and his people jump in, but Ethan frantically assaults Rick, screaming that anybody who tries to stop him is killing Craig. Other Hilltop residents are shocked as they watch Rick kill Ethan, prompting the other two traders, Andy and Crystal, to begin attacking as well. Jesus intervenes and is able to break up the fight. Abraham, who became eerily still while being strangled by Andy during the fight, says that he is "better than alright" as Daryl helps him up; he smiles, seemingly having come to a decision in his personal life as Rosita's broken medallion is shown discarded on the ground.

After Gregory is stabilized, Jesus explains that Negan is the head of a group called the Saviors. The Saviors came to the Hilltop, issuing a lot of demands and even more threats, resulting in a deal: half of the Hilltop's supplies, crops and livestock goes to the Saviors in exchange for peace. Daryl and Abraham say they were unimpressed by the Saviors they had killed, and Daryl offers to kill Negan, take out his boys and rescue the hostage in exchange for food, medicine and "one of them cows." Maggie closes the deal with Gregory, demanding half of everything from the Hilltop in advance.

Andy and Jesus go with Rick's group to execute a plan to take down the Saviors. Carson examines Maggie and gives her an ultrasound picture of her unborn child, along with pre-natal vitamins. The picture is passed around the RV on the trip back, and seems to resonate with Abraham who exchanges a look with Glenn.

== Production ==
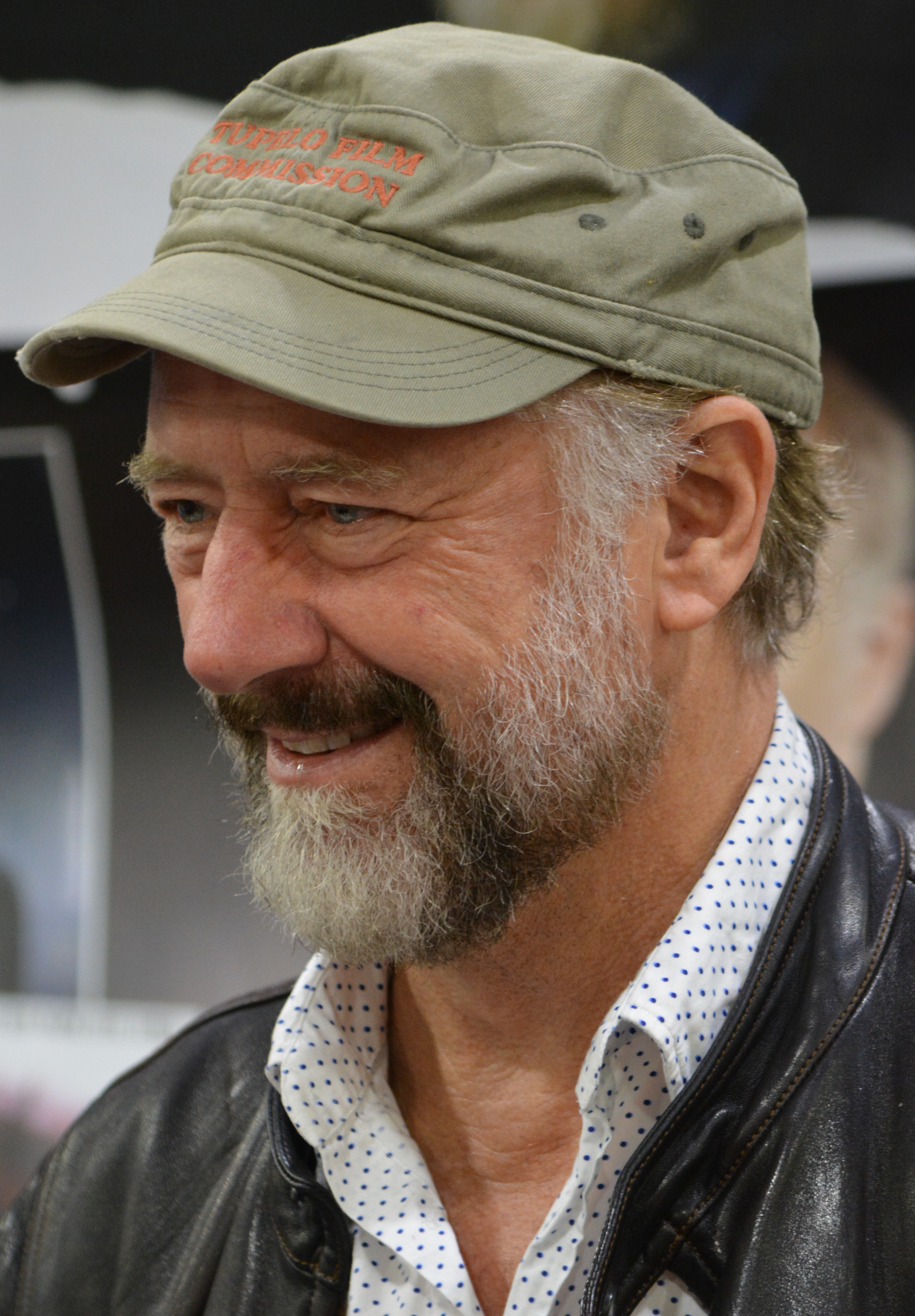
Xander Berkeley made his first appearance as Gregory in this episode.

This episode marks the first appearance of comic book character Gregory, who is portrayed by Xander Berkeley. His casting was originally announced in September 2015, and his role was confirmed to be Gregory in January 2016.

== Reception ==
=== Critical reception ===
The episode received positive reviews from critics. It holds a 96% positive rating with an average score of 7.6 out of 10 on the review aggregator Rotten Tomatoes. The critics' consensus reads: "'Knots Untie' is an excellent, albeit unevenly scripted, foundation for the dangerous and degenerative societal clash it foreshadows."

=== Ratings ===
The episode averaged a 6.1 rating in adults 18–49, with 12.794 million viewers overall.
