= Greg Hemphill =

Scottish actor and comedian (born 1969)

- Born: Gregory Edward Hemphill; 14 December 1969 (age 56); Springburn, Glasgow, Scotland
- Education: University of Glasgow
- Occupations: Comedian; actor; director; writer
- Years active: c.1990-present
- Spouse: Julie Wilson Nimmo (m. 1999)
- Children: 2
- Relatives: Steve Hemphill (Brother)

Gregory Edward Hemphill (born 14 December 1969) is a Scottish comedian, actor, writer, and director. Born in Springburn, an inner–city district in Glasgow, Scotland, Hemphill moved to Montreal in Canada in the mid-1970s before returning to Scotland in 1988.

Hemphill is one of the executive producers and co–owner of the production company Effingee Productions. His work with Ford Kiernan, his long standing comedy and script writing partner, includes the BBC Scotland comedy series Chewin' The Fat (1999–2005) and Still Game (2002–2007, 2016–2019). Hemphill was Rector of the University of Glasgow between 2001 and 2004.

== Early and personal life ==
Hemphill was born in Glasgow, Scotland, the son of Edward, a chartered accountant, and Anne Hemphill (née Brophy) a teacher. The family left Scotland in the mid-1970s, and he spent much of his childhood in Montreal, which has contributed to his Scottish-Canadian accent.

He returned to Scotland in 1988 at the age of 18 to study at the University of Glasgow, where he achieved an MA Honours Degree in theatre, film and television. He is married to actress Julie Wilson Nimmo; they have two sons. Hemphill said that despite living in Canada, he "always felt Scottish", claiming that "My dad was from Maryhill, my mum was from St George’s Cross, and it seemed that everyone on the West Island of Montreal was from somewhere else".

Hemphill was elected Rector of the University of Glasgow in March 2001. He was one of five candidates and narrowly defeated Alasdair Gray for the post.

== Career ==
=== Early career ===
Hemphill has appeared in several projects. In 1990, he performed at the Edinburgh Fringe with Rab Christie and Neil Warhurst as the "Trio Brothers Troup", where they won the 1990 "So You Think You're Funny" trophy. He continued his stage work, appearing in the 1992 God Plus Support performance and in the popular 1995 Only an Excuse? tour. He also ventured into radio as the original presenter of football show, Off the Ball on BBC Radio Scotland and Eddie Mair Live.

Hemphill and Kiernan scripted seven episodes between 1999 and 2000, for then popular children's television show Hububb. These were, Lullabubb, Top of the Bubbs, Conquer Leserest, Casual-Tea, Bubb Goes Boo, 2010: A Space Bubbsy and No Go Pogo. He guest starred alongside Kiernan in one episode, which he also scripted with Kiernan, Casual-Tea. However, his best known performances are alongside Ford Kiernan in the television sketch show Chewin' the Fat and its spin off, Still Game. In series three of Still Game, Hemphill's brother Steve has a cameo as a CN Tower lift operative.

=== Still Game ===
Following the success of Chewin' The Fat, Kiernan and Hemphill wrote Still Game. Still Game was based on the original play that the pair wrote for the Edinburgh Festival in 1997. The Characters Jack Jarvis and Victor McDade had appeared throughout the four series of Chewin' The Fat. Six series and four specials were originally broadcast between 2002 and 2007. The series ended following the sixth series in 2007, with Ford Kiernan, Greg Hemphill and Paul Riley's company Effingee Productions which produced Still Game, thought to have split up after Riley walked away to go it alone after being refused more control over the future of the company by Kiernan. Hemphill stated that he didn't want a "boardroom battle". The split ultimately resulted in the indefinite hiatus of the series.

In 2012, actor and playwright Kenny Boyle acquired the rights to the original stage play of Still Game and toured the show, with a new cast, to The Tron theatre, FTH theatre, and The Ayr Gaiety Theatre. The original play had not been staged for 14 years. Kiernan and Hemphill came to see the performances and consequently began considering reviving Still Game officially.

On 15 October 2013, the Daily Record ran a front-page story that the show would be returning. On 23 October 2013, Ford Kiernan and Greg Hemphill announced details of live shows entitled Still Game Live at The SSE Hydro in Glasgow at a press conference. They were scheduled to perform four shows beginning in September 2014, but due to high demand, it was extended to 16 and then 21 shows. On 24 October 2013 Kiernan confirmed in the Daily Record that Kenny Boyle's tour of the original stage show had been one of the instigating factors for Still Game's return. The 21 shows at The Hydro ran from 19 September 2014 until 10 October 2014, played to 210,000 fans and made £6,000,000 in ticket sales. The show received mixed reviews.

On 12 May 2016, the BBC announced that the show would return in 2016 with a six-part seventh series, nine years after the previous series concluded. Filming of the new seventh series started in the summer and the series began on 7 October 2016. The show's return attracted its highest ever overnight audience for a single episode on 7 October, taking a 58% share of the Scottish TV audience with 1,300,000 viewers. The show also aired for the first time on BBC One across the UK nationwide and drew a total audience of 3,200,000. On 16 March 2017, it was announced that an eighth series has been commissioned to air on BBC One with plans to broadcast towards the end of 2017. The series was pushed back to start on 8 March 2018. On 13 July 2018, the BBC announced that Still Game would return for the ninth and final series later in 2019, after which the show will end. Filming for the ninth series started in August 2018 and was completed on 14 September 2018.

In September 2016, a second live show Still Game Live 2: Bon Voyage was announced for the SSE Hydro. The second stage show was to run for ten nights beginning 4 February 2017, but in October 2016, a further five performances were added. Unlike the previous live show, this show was not televised or recorded in any other way. The third and final SSE Hydro live show Still Game: The Final Farewell was officially announced on 1 November 2018, with five shows in September 2019 taking place over three days. A further 5 shows were announced on 2 November.

=== Other work ===
Hemphill appeared in the Scottish Gaelic-language drama, Eilbheas, set in the Western Isles, in which Hemphill played the spirit of Elvis. It was first shown on 19 September 2008, the launch night of BBC Alba. He has also written Appointment with the Wicker Man with Donald McLeary for the National Theatre of Scotland, a stage production about a small community's attempts to produce a musical version of The Wicker Man.

Hemphill has been involved in the Scottish wrestling scene, matched against actor, comedian and writer, Robert Florence. They played bitter rivals at "Kelvin Brawl" in the Glasgow's Kelvin Hall on 21 June 2013. Comedian Frankie Boyle became part of this venture, unmasking himself at the end of the match.

Hemphill guest-starred in an episode of the award-winning children's television programme Katie Morag in 2014, playing the part of Donald John Cameron. He then starred as Mr Sawdust in two series of the CBeebies television show Olga da Polga alongside his wife Julie Wilson Nimmo.

On New Year's Day 2023, Hemphill and Nimmo starred in documentary television programme Jules and Greg's Wild Swim about on BBC Scotland and BBC iPlayer. The full series of six episodes was released in 2023 and later appeared on BBC Two.

In March 2023, Hemphill featured on a BBC Scotland programme as part of the broadcaster's centenary celebrations, alongside wife Julie Wilson Nimmo and Still Game co-star Sanjeev Kohli.

Beginning in April 2024, Hemphill featured as Ade MacArthur, the father of series protagonist Nina, on the Scottish BBC comedy Dinosaur; also reprising his role in series two. The same year he made his Hollywood debut, in a cameo appearance in the film Deadpool & Wolverine as a bartender.

In September 2025, he starred in the ITV drama programme Coldwater. In October 2025, Hemphill and his wife released a book titled Jules and Greg's Wild Swim, based on the programme of the same name. The couple went on a book tour around Scotland and appeared on STV News to promote the book. They also appeared at Wigtown Book Festival.

=== Directing ===
In 2016, alongside Donald McLeary, Hemphill wrote the script for the horror/comedy film West Skerra Light. At a length of one hour, this was his first full-length drama as a film director. In 2017, alongside Hopscotch Films, Hemphill was involved in directing the black comedy ghost-hunting drama Long Night at Blackstone.

== Filmography ==
=== Television ===
Year	Title	Role	Notes
1995-1996	Pulp Video	Various characters	Also writer
1995-2024	Only an Excuse?	Various characters	2 episodes
1997	The Baldy Man	Various characters	1 episode
1998	Rab C. Nesbitt	Newsreader	1 episode
1999	Hububb	Workman 2	1 episode; also writer
1999-2005	Chewin' the Fat	Various characters	Co-creator and writer with Ford Kiernan
2002–2007; 2016–2019	Still Game	Victor McDade	Co-creator and writer with Ford Kiernan; appears in all 62 episodes
2005	Balamory	Des	Series 4 Episode 4: "The Game Show"
2010	Inspector George Gently	Neil McManus	Series 3 Episode 1: "Gently Evil"
2015	Katie Morag	Donald John Cameron	Series 2 Episode 2: "Katie Morag and the Family Tree"
2021–present	Queen of the New Year	Various characters	BBC Scotland sketch show for Hogmanay
2022-2023	Olga da Polga	Mr. Sawdust	16 episodes
2024–present	Dinosaur	Ade MacArthur	
2024–present	Jules and Greg's Wild Swim	Himself	
2025	Silo	Head Guard Randy	2 episodes
2025	Coldwater	Bobby	

=== Film ===
Year	Title	Role	Notes
1998	Och Around The Clock	Victor	Television film
2008	Eilbheas	Elvis	Television film
2009	No Holds Bard	Robert Laughlin	Television film
2010	The Dunwich Horror	Narrator	
2012	Sir Billi	Officer McTavish	Voice role
2014	Glasgow Girls	Jack McConnell	Television film
2015	Swung	Daniel	
2024	Deadpool & Wolverine	Seedy Bartender	
2024	Man and Witch: The Dance of a Thousand Steps	Ogre King	

=== Film (as director) ===
Year	Title	Distributor	Ref.
2016	West Skerra Light	BBC	
2018	Long Night at Blackstone	BBC	

=== Theatre ===
Year	Title	Role	Venue
1999	Still Game	Victor	Cottiers, Glasgow, Scotland
2014	Still Game: Live in Glasgow	Victor McDade	SSE Hydro, Glasgow, Scotland
2017	Still Game Live 2: Bon Voyage	Victor McDade	SSE Hydro, Glasgow, Scotland
2019	Still Game: The Final Farewell	Victor McDade	SSE Hydro, Glasgow, Scotland

Academic offices
Preceded by Ross Kemp	Rector of the University of Glasgow; 2001–2004	Succeeded by Mordechai Vanunu
