= The Next World =

- The Walking Dead episode
- Daryl and Rick confront Jesus, after he steals the truck they found.
- Episode no.: Season 6 Episode 10
- Directed by: Kari Skogland
- Written by: Angela Kang; Corey Reed
- Cinematography by: Stephen Campbell
- Editing by: Dan Liu
- Original air date: February 21, 2016
- Running time: 43 minutes

Guest appearances
- Merritt Wever as Dr. Denise Cloyd; Tom Payne as Paul "Jesus" Rovia; Katelyn Nacon as Enid; Tovah Feldshuh as Deanna Monroe; Mandi Christine Kerr as Barbara

Episode chronology
← Previous "No Way Out"	Next → "Knots Untie"
- The Walking Dead season 6

"The Next World" is the tenth episode of the sixth season of the post-apocalyptic horror television series The Walking Dead, which aired on AMC on February 21, 2016. The episode was written by Angela Kang and Corey Reed, and directed by Kari Skogland.

This episode marks the first appearance of the character "Jesus" from the comic, Paul Rovia, changed from Monroe, to distinguish from the first family of Alexandria. He is portrayed by Tom Payne.

== Plot ==
After the passing of two months, the walls of the Alexandria Safe-Zone have been repaired and expanded, and the residents are living a seemingly normal lifestyle. Rick and Daryl are about to go on a supply run. Michonne asks Rick for spearmint and baking soda toothpaste, while Denise requests a specific soft drink so she can surprise Tara. Eugene maps out nearby agricultural suppliers, which could improve the dwindling food supply.

Eugene's research leads Rick and Daryl to a truck filled with food, ammunition and other supplies including a case of toothpaste. They drive the truck along a different route to return to Alexandria, and stop at a gas station to loot a fallen vending machine. As they struggle to break into it, a long-haired masked man runs into Rick, claiming that he's running from a group of walkers. They all lie about not having a camp, and after Rick introduces himself and Daryl, the man removes his mask and gives his name as Paul Rovia, but tells them his friends call him Jesus. Rick starts to ask his three recruitment questions, despite Daryl's objections, but Jesus runs off. Rick and Daryl hear noises from behind the gas station and, forewarned of approaching walkers, decide to investigate, only to find firecrackers popping. Realizing that Jesus tricked them and pick-pocketed the truck's keys from Rick, they sprint back to see Jesus driving the truck away, dragging the vending machine behind it. Rick and Daryl pursue him on foot, eventually coming across the vending machine. Daryl breaks it open and obtains the drink Denise requested, Orange Crush. As they catch their breath, Rick expresses his positive views on bringing more people into Alexandria.

Meanwhile, Carl and Enid venture into the woods. They come across a balloon with an illegible note, and Enid is hopeful about other people but Carl says they're probably dead already. They sit together, and Enid confesses that she doesn't like being out there anymore. On their way back, Carl spots a walker and attracts its attention to kill it, but when they see who it is Carl stops while Enid wants to kill it. The two argue, and Carl sends Enid back to Alexandria.

Later, Rick and Daryl catch up to the truck and find Jesus changing a tire. They attack Jesus, who holds his own against the two of them until subdued at gunpoint. Rick leaves Jesus tied loosely on the side of the road, believing he can free himself once they're gone. When they drive across a field at the next farm, Rick and Daryl hear bumping on the truck's roof, and Rick rapidly brakes to send Jesus toppling from the top of the truck. Jesus runs and Daryl jumps out to pursue him, while Rick parks the truck near a lake and kills a few stray walkers. Jesus gets into the driver's seat as Daryl fights him. Jesus grabs Daryl's handgun and shoots an approaching walker, saving Daryl's life. Daryl pulls Jesus from the truck, which is set into neutral and begins rolling backwards. Jesus is struck on the back of the head by the truck's door, knocking him out, as the truck rolls into the lake and submerges.

As Michonne is patrolling the newly erected walls, she spots Spencer entering the woods alone with a shovel and sets after him. As they walk through the woods, Michonne spots Carl running and sees a lone walker, which is revealed to be a reanimated Deanna. With Michonne's assistance, Spencer stabs the walker and buries it, a large "D" carved on a tree to mark the grave. That night, Michonne confronts Carl about not killing the walker. He believes walkers should only be killed by someone who loved them in life. When he tells her he would do it for her, Michonne embraces him.

Rick and Daryl return to Alexandria with an unconscious Jesus, whom they leave tied up in a room. Rick and Michonne sit together on the couch in their living room. They laugh as they talk about their days, and soon begin holding hands and kissing intimately. Later that night, Rick and Michonne are naked, sleeping in bed together, when a voice is heard calling Rick. Michonne and Rick leap up and grab their weapons as the speaker is revealed to be Jesus, who is standing at the foot of the bed and says they need to talk.

== Production ==
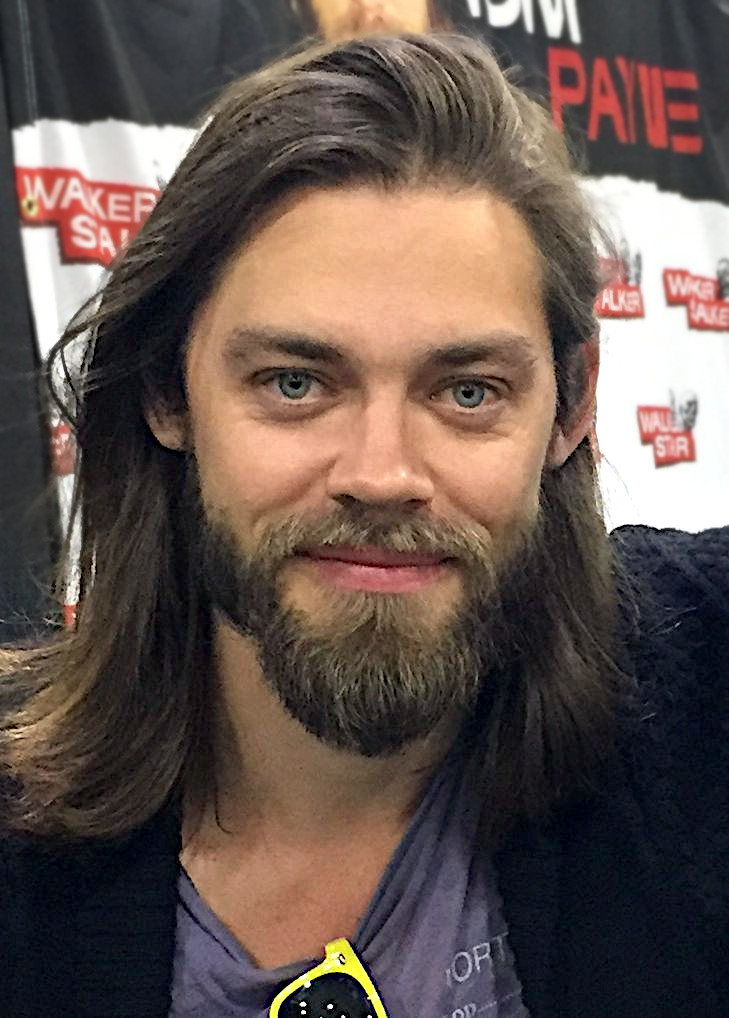
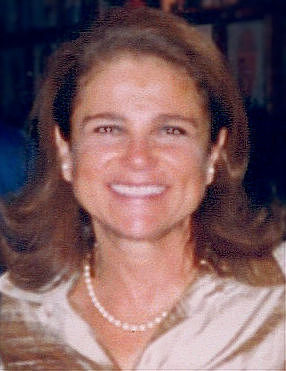
This episode marked the first appearance of Paul "Jesus" Rovia (Tom Payne, left) and the final appearance of Deanna Monroe (Tovah Feldshuh, right).

Actor Tom Payne, who plays the new character Paul "Jesus" Rovia, auditioned, was cast, and began filming the role all in the span of about a week.

Andrew Lincoln has said in interview that he voiced his desire for "A Butch and Sundance kind of episode, where these guys are just hanging out" over a meal with Norman Reedus and Greg Nicotero, that they pitched it to Scott M. Gimple who found a place for it in the back eight [episodes], and writer Angela Kang dialed into it with a different flavour for the show.

Lincoln spoke of his time filming the episode:

"The most fun bits were every single scene with Norman Reedus. There are a lot of outtakes on that episode. I think there's a lot of messing around and improvising ... It's astonishing, because it was the first time in six years that we were allowed to just play. Also, this kind of brotherly relationship. In any other circumstances, if there weren't zombies on the earth, I'd be arresting this sucker. Yet, we're forced together ... It's people that really shouldn't be in the same space, forced to live with each other, and making it work and finding their own little soft spots and weak spots, and just messing around."

== Themes ==
It's phenomenal what the writers did with Carl, and Carl sees her in the woods and leads her toward us, and it's this beautiful remembrance of what he had to go through in the prison with his mother, giving birth to his baby sister. And the fact that he could have the foresight and just the idea to do that so that he could bring her to me, and then he disappears into the woods and doesn't ask for any recognition — I mean, what a hero.

— Austin Nichols

Darryl Woodard of The Huffington Post wrote that family is one of the most consistent themes voiced in The Walking Dead and Brian Moylan of The Guardian cited it as the biggest theme of the episode.

Richard Nguyen of The Harvard Crimson points out that Spencer killing and burying his zombified mother, Deanna, grants him spiritual revitalization and emotional closure after the loss of his entire family. Michonne tells him that family in the new world isn't about blood but bonds of experience. Carl tells Michonne that Deanna needed to be killed by someone who loved her. Through this metaphor they say they love each other, Carl, Michonne and Rick move toward a new iteration of family, and one that is stronger because of their history together.

== Music ==
This episode offered the following songs:

- "More Than a Feeling" - Boston
- "Action Packed" - Ronnie Dawson
- "If My Heart Was A Car" - Old 97's

== Reception ==
=== Critical reception ===
The episode received highly positive reviews. It holds a 93% positive rating with an average score of 7.98 out of 10 on the review aggregator Rotten Tomatoes. The critics' consensus reads: "Vintage-style action and the spark of a hot new romance make "The Next World" a gratifying successor to the shocking mid-season premiere."

Lenika Cruz and David Sims of The Atlantic praise the much-needed time jump which refreshed the series from the brutal slog of previous episodes. Sims calls it, "A rather light, funny episode that ended on a surprising note—but not a bloody one, for once." Cruz called it one of the show's best hours. "Every pairing this week not only made sense, but also meaningfully advanced the story or the characters." Tim Surette of TV.com also praised the episode for its humor, citing it as "the funniest episode of The Walking Dead ever."

Writing for IGN, Matt Fowler gave a good analysis saying: Despite having a few moments of danger, "The Next World" was the lightest, most joy-filled episode of The Walking Dead since the start. Hell, there were actual moments of (intentional) humor. Rick's new life feels earned and deserved and I loved how this episode allowed "No Way Out" - from last week, to be the definitive end point for the whole initial Alexandria arc by skipping over (what's usually) obligatory reflection and wallowing.

John Saavedra of Den of Geek! praised the episode by saying: Holy mullet, am I about to describe an episode of The Walking Dead as "lighthearted?" Well, "The Next World" kind of is. This is at least, very definitely, The Walking Dead's version of a light action romp full of buddy cop fun. Last week, Robert Kirkman described tonight's episode as "almost like Lethal Weapon." And he's not wrong, as Daryl points out at the end of "The Next World," in a wonderful Murtaugh-inspired moment, that it's dumb for him and Rick to keep going out on reckless supply runs, just for the two of them to agree that they're just going to do it again the next day. As the men cheerfully walk out of the door—it's a shame no sax is playing in the background—I got the sense that both Daryl and Rick had finally embraced their situation, not as the damning thing of past years, but as a challenge they need/will overcome.

=== Ratings ===
The episode averaged a 6.6 rating in adults 18–49, with 13.483 million viewers overall.
