= Jenny Ryan (disambiguation) =

Jenny Ryan (born 1982) is an English game show personality.

Jennifer Ryan may refer to:

- Jenny Ryan (actress), Scottish television actress
- Jenny Ryan, a character on Castle; see List of Castle characters#Jenny Ryan
- Jennifer Ann Ryan (born 1963), real name of Australian romance writer Jennie Adams
- Jennifer A. Ryan, 2004 candidate for U.S. vice president for the Christian Freedom Party (see presidential candidate Thomas Harens)
