= Denise Mina =

Scottish crime writer, playwright (born 1966)

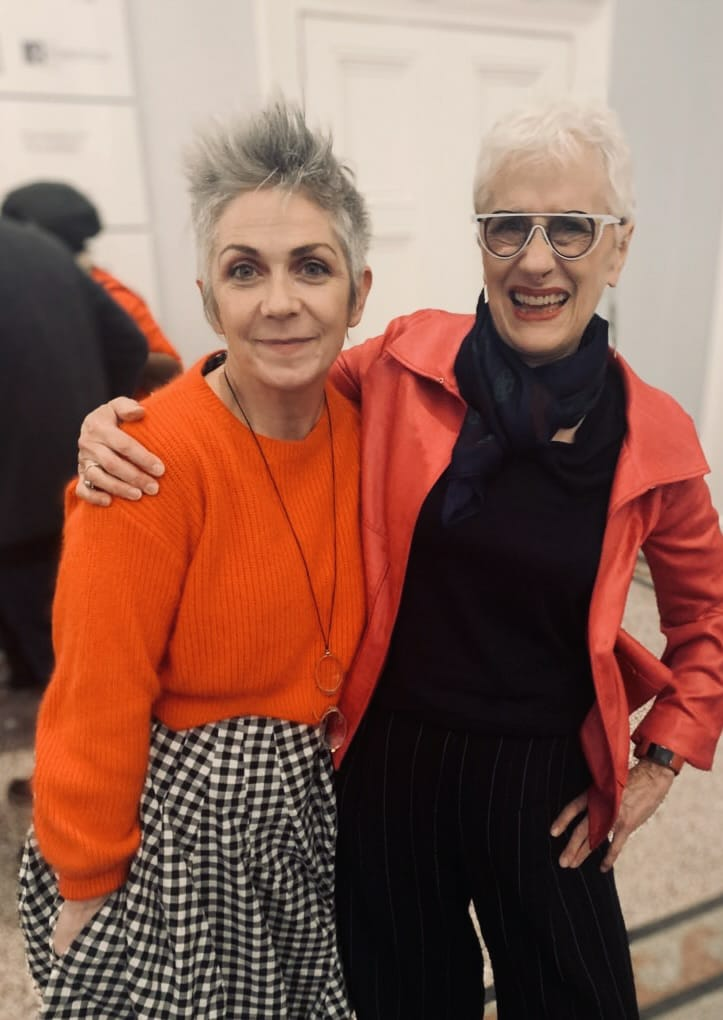
- Mina (left) in 2020
- Born: 21 August 1966 (age 60); East Kilbride, Scotland
- Writing career
- Genre: Crime fiction
- Notable works: Garnethill, The Long Drop
- Website: www.denisemina.co.uk

Denise Mina (born 21 August 1966) is a Scottish writer active since 1996. Her debut novel Garnethill (1998 Transworld) was a bestseller and won the Crime Writers' Association John Creasey Award for best debut. It was followed by Exile and Resolution, completing a trilogy of novels featuring Maureen O’Donnell, a survivor of childhood sexual abuse.

Described as ‘crime writing royalty’ by Val McDermid, she was a key figure in the rise of Tartan Noir. Conviction (2019) was a Reese's Book Club Pick.

Her latest novel, The Good Liar (2025) examines forensic junk science and the implications for justice.

She is best known for her crime novels and short stories. Her non-fiction novel, The Long Drop, was about serial killer Peter Manuel's trial in Glasgow 1958. She also writes graphic novels, wrote ‘Hellblazer’ for a year, is a playwright and regularly presents television and radio.

== Biography ==
Denise Mina was born in East Kilbride in 1966. Her father worked as an engineer.

After serving in the Merchant Navy, her father worked as a draughtsman in the oil industry. During the North Sea Oil boom of the 1970s and ’80s the family lived in Paris, London, The Hague, Bergen and Invergordon.

Her education was erratic; the family moved often, and she changed schools thirteen times. At sixteen, she attended Orpington College but dropped out.

She worked in bars, a cinema, a meat factory and as an auxiliary nurse in several nursing homes in Bromley and Beckenham, South London.

After a brief spell in Galway, she moved to Glasgow and attended Langside HE College.

== Career ==
She graduated from Glasgow University with an LLB (Hons) in Law where she was awarded the Gilbert Forbes Medal for forensic science.

She began a PhD at Strathclyde University Law School on The Ascription of Mental Illness to Female Offenders where she wrote her first novel Garnethill (1998). The trilogy was completed by Exile (2000) and Resolution (2001). Mina's first Paddy Meehan novel, The Field of Blood (2005), was filmed for broadcast in 2011 by the BBC, starring Jayd Johnson, Peter Capaldi and David Morrissey.

She is known for her work across crime fiction, theatre, television, and documentary filmmaking.

In August 2025, Mina was a guest on the Off the Shelf Podcast as part of a feature on the McIlvanney Prize.

=== Plays ===
She was an early contributor to the radical Oran Mor ‘A Play, A Pie and A Pint’ series of new and experimental theatre under David McLennan. Her first play there, Ida Tamson (2006, based on the short story of the same name published in The Evening Times for the Aye Write Festival), starred Elaine C Smith and was directed by Morag Fullerton.

The play was revived for a second run in 2019 to celebrated twenty years of PPP at Oran Mor.

Her play Peter Manuel: Meet Me (2013) depicted the night serial killer Peter Manuel spent drinking with the man whose family he murdered.

Her credits include Mrs Puntila and Her Man Matti, her 2020 gender-switched adaptation of Brecht's play Mr Puntila and His Man Matti staged at the Royal Lyceum in Edinburgh. Directed by Murat Daltaban of Istanbul's DOT Theatre, it featured Elaine C. Smith and Steven McNicoll in the lead roles.

=== Literary judging panels ===
She has served as a judge for several literary awards, including the John Creasey Prize in 1999 and 2000, the Gillian Purvis Award in 2004, and the Women's Prize for Fiction in 2014. From 2015 to 2021, she chaired the Board of Trustees for the Glasgow Film Theatre.

=== TV presenting ===
In television, she has written and presented documentaries such as Poe's Women for BBC4 and Skinner and Mina's Literary Road Trip for Sky Arts, which examined the relationships between literary figures including Samuel Johnson, James Boswell, Wordsworth, Coleridge, Alexander Pope and Jonathan Swift.

=== Short films ===
Her 2012 short film Multum in Parvo, screened at the Sheffield Documentary Festival, combined interviews with her mother and siblings about their childhood in Rutherglen with footage of the family watching the film together at the Glasgow Film Theatre.

== Personal life ==
Mina married in 2005 and has two sons. Her eldest, Fergus, born in 2003 with a life-limiting condition, died in 2017.

== Awards and honours ==
- 1998 John Creasey Dagger for Best First Crime Novel, Garnethill
- 2008 Honorary Doctor of Letters from Glasgow University.
- 2011 The Martin Beck Award (Bästa till svenska översatta kriminalroman), The End of the Wasp Season
- 2012 Theakston's Old Peculier Crime Novel of the Year Award, The End of the Wasp Season
- 2013 Theakston's Old Peculier Crime Novel of the Year Award, Gods and Beasts
- 2017 Gordon Burn Prize, The Long Drop
- 2017 McIlvanney Prize for Scottish Crime Novel of the Year, The Long Drop
- 2020 Deutscher Krimi Preis (Category: International crime writers) for Gods and Beasts
- 2025 Honorary Doctorate from Strathclyde University.

== Bibliography ==
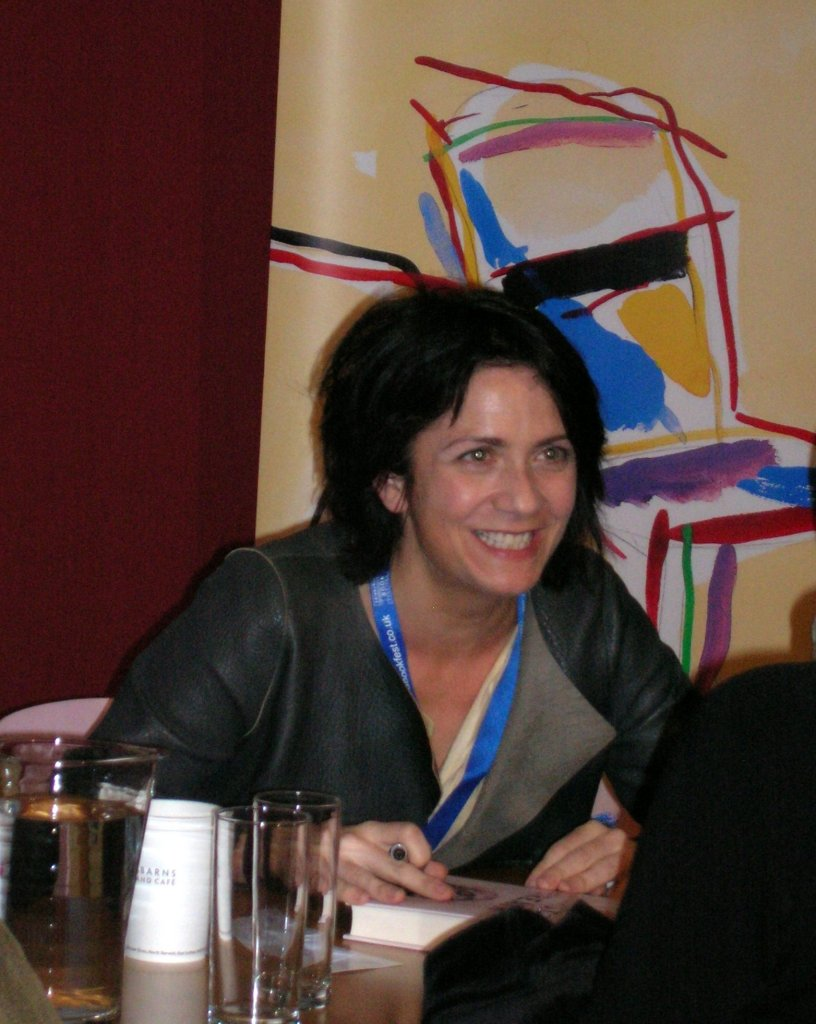
Denise Mina signing books at the Edinburgh International Book Festival 2007

=== Novels ===
Garnethill trilogy

- Garnethill (1998)
- Exile (2000)
- Resolution (2001)

Patricia "Paddy" Meehan novels

- The Field of Blood (2005)
- The Dead Hour (2006)
- The Last Breath (2007) – published as Slip of the Knife in America

Alex Morrow novels

- Still Midnight (2009)
- The End of the Wasp Season (2010)
- Gods and Beasts (2012)
- The Red Road (2013)
- Blood, Salt, Water (2014)

Anna & Fin novels

- Conviction (2019)
- Confidence (2022)

Other novels

- Sanctum (2003) (published as Deception in the US in 2004)
- The Long Drop (2017) is based on the 1958 trial and execution of the serial killer Peter Manuel.
- The Less Dead (2020)
- Rizzio (2021)
- The Second Murderer (2023), a Philip Marlowe novel
- Three Fires (2023)
- The Good Liar (2025)

=== Comics ===
To date, the entirety of Mina's work in comics has been published under DC Comics' Vertigo imprint:

- Hellblazer #216–228 (with Leonardo Manco and Cristiano Cucina (#223), 2006–2007) collected as John Constantine, Hellblazer Volume 19 (tpb, 328 pages, 2018, ISBN 1-401-28080-3)
- Vertigo Crime: A Sickness in the Family (with Antonio Fuso, graphic novel, 192 pages, 2010, ISBN 1-4012-1081-3)
- The Millennium Trilogy graphic novel adaptations:
  - The Girl with the Dragon Tattoo (tpb, 312 pages, 2014, ISBN 1-4012-4286-3) collects:
    - The Girl with the Dragon Tattoo Book One (with Leonardo Manco and Andrea Mutti, hc, 152 pages, 2012, ISBN 1-40123-557-3)
    - The Girl with the Dragon Tattoo Book Two (with Leonardo Manco and Andrea Mutti, hc, 160 pages, 2013, ISBN 1-4012-3558-1)
  - The Girl Who Played with Fire (with Andrea Mutti, Leonardo Manco and Antonio Fuso, hc, 288 pages, 2014, ISBN 1-401-23757-6; sc, 2015, ISBN 1-4012-5550-7)
  - The Girl Who Kicked the Hornet's Nest (with Andrea Mutti and Antonio Fuso, hc, 272 pages, 2015, ISBN 1-4012-3759-2; sc, 2016, ISBN 1-401-26477-8)

=== Plays ===
- Ida Tamson (2006)
- A Drunk Woman Looks at the Thistle (2007), inspired by Hugh MacDiarmid's modernist poem, A Drunk Man Looks at the Thistle, and first performed by Karen Dunbar.
- The Meek, radio play for BBC Radio 3, broadcast on 7 March 2009

== Notes ==
Preceded by Mike Carey	Hellblazer writer 2006–2007	Succeeded by Andy Diggle
