= Carmen Pieraccini =

British actress

Carmen Pieraccini (born 1979) is a Scottish actress and clown doctor, who has appeared in the BBC Scotland soap opera River City since 2003, until her departure in 2007. She returned full-time to the soap in 2010 and again in 2019 for a short stint and again in November 2024. Her other screen appearances include the BBC comedy Dear Green Place (2006–08), and the films Small Faces (1996) and Late Night Shopping (2001).

== Biography ==
Carmen Pieraccini was born in Paisley, Scotland, and attended Castlehead and Johnstone High Schools. She has worked in Glasgow's South Side. She attended Scottish Youth Theatre.

Pieraccini appeared briefly in the 1996 Gillies MacKinnon film Small Faces, the 2001 Saul Metzstein film Late Night Shopping, and the 2001 music video for the Belle and Sebastian single "Jonathan David", before taking on the role of Kelly Marie Adams in River City from 2003. She also played Tina in the comedy series Dear Green Place (2006–08), opposite Ford Kiernan. On stage, she appeared as an army private in the 2008 play An Advert for the Army and played the part of Margrit in the 30th anniversary touring production of Tony Roper's The Steamie in the Autumn of 2017.

She studied clowning in Barcelona under French clown Philippe Gaulier and worked as a clown part-time for around 12 years. By 2022, she had become a full-time clown doctor.

In 2025, Pieraccini starred as Deputy Chief Commissioner Katriona Muldoon in The Chief, a spin-off series to Scot Squad.

== Personal life ==
Her sister Sita sang in the Scottish electropop band Futuristic Retro Champions.
