= Stephen Hagan (actor) =

Actor from Northern Ireland

- Born: 25 January 1985 (age 41); Belfast, Northern Ireland, United Kingdom
- Occupation: Actor
- Years active: 2007—present
- Known for: Stan Lee's Lucky Man
- Spouse: Wendy Wason
- Children: 1

Stephen Hagan (born 25 January 1985) is a British actor from Belfast, Northern Ireland.

== Early life and education ==
Hagan was born in Belfast and grew up in nearby Greenisland. He was a student at the Carrickfergus Grammar School, contributing to amateur dramatics at Youth Lyric as a teenager, as well as White Lights in Whitehead. Prior to pursuing a career as an actor, Hagan planned to study accountancy at Northumbria University and join his father's business. He graduated from the London Academy of Music and Dramatic Art in 2007.

== Career ==
=== Stage career ===
Hagan's first notable role after drama school was a part as Vito Barratini, a muse of the artist Michelangelo, in Antony Sher's play The Giant. Hagan was in the original cast of the West End and Broadway hit production End of the Rainbow, as well as in Cyrano de Bergerac opposite Joseph Fiennes at the Chichester Festival Theatre. Hagan also appeared in The York Relist at Riverside Studios, and The Real Thing at Salisbury Playhouse. He has also taken his turn in several productions for the Royal Shakespeare Company, including roles in Twelfth Night, The Tempest, The Comedy of Errors and Troilus and Cressida.

=== Television and film career ===
Hagan had a role in the Steven Seagal film Against the Dark. In 2007, he appeared in the British drama Clapham Junction, before appearing in an episode of the BBC drama Mistresses in 2008. He also had a recurring role on the BBC drama The Cut and the ITV miniseries Injustice in 2011. He also made an appearance in the episode The Ballad of Midsomer County, of the ITV series Midsomer Murders, where he played Jay Templeton. Other roles have included Shooting for Socrates, Best: His Mother's Son, Risen (as Bartholemew) with Joseph Fiennes, Zoo and A Royal Christmas with Jane Seymour.

Hagan has a recurring role in the Sky TV series Stan Lee's Lucky Man, which sees him play Rich, the brother of James Nesbitt in his role of DI Harry Clayton.

== Personal life ==
In 2012, Hagan married comedian and actress Wendy Wason, with whom he has a son and two step-children. Hagan's grandparents are friends with the parents of his Lucky Man co-star, and fellow Northern Irish actor, James Nesbitt. The two had met ten years prior to the show, when Hagan was a teenager and Nesbitt was back in Northern Ireland filming Murphy's Law. Hagan is a football and rugby fan and supports Arsenal FC and Ulster Rugby.

== Filmography ==
Year	Title	Role	Notes
2007	Clapham Junction	TV Assistant	
2009	Against the Dark	Ricky	
2009	Mistresses	Handsome Mixologist	1 episode
2009	Best: His Mother's Son	Steve Fullaway	TV film
2009	The Cut	Ryan	9 episodes
2011	Injustice	David Clanning	3 episodes
2014	Shooting for Socrates	Phil Hughes	Feature film
2014	A Royal Christmas	Leo	TV film
2014	Identity	Jasper	TV film
2015	Midsomer Murders	Jay Templeton	1 episode
2016	The Truth Commissioner	Alan	
2016–2019	Lucky Man	Clayton	20 episodes
2016	Risen	Bartholomew	
2017	Zoo	Jake McClure	
2017-	C. B. Strike	DCI Richard Murphy	
2019	Medici	Leonardo da Vinci	2 episodes
2021	The Larkins	Tom Fisher	6 episodes
2022–2024	Hope Street	DC Al Quinn	12 episodes
2023	You	Malcolm Harding	TV series
2025	Love of the Irish	Liam	Hallmark Movie
