= Partick Trinity Church =

- Partick Trinity Parish Church
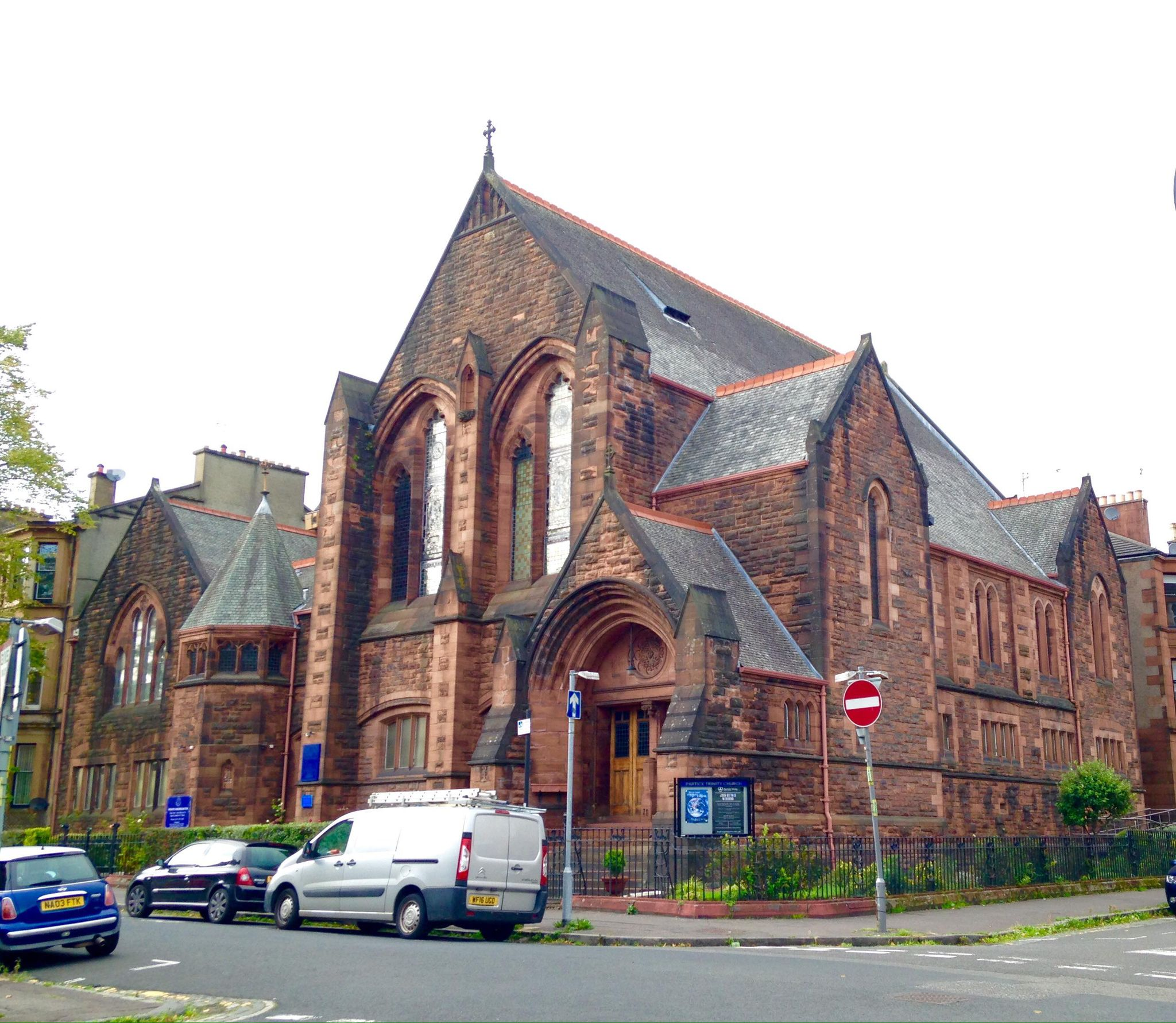
- Partick Trinity Church
- 55°52′24″N 4°17′55″W
- Location: Glasgow
- Country: Scotland
- Denomination: Church of Scotland
- Website: Church Website

History
- Former name(s): Partick East Church; Partick East & Dowanhill Church
- Status: Active

Architecture
- Functional status: Parish church
- Architect: John Bennie Wilson
- Architectural type: Church
- Style: Neo-Gothic
- Years built: 1897–1899

Administration
- Parish: Partick, Dowanhill

Listed Building – Category B
- Designated: 15 December 1970
- Reference no.: LB32884

Partick Trinity Church is a 19th century Parish church of the Church of Scotland, located in the Partick area of Glasgow, Scotland.

== History of the Church building ==
The church building was founded as Partick East United Free Church and was built between 1897 and 1899 in the Scottish Neo-Gothic style, on designs by John Bennie Wilson. Red sandstone was used to build the church, which includes an octagonal Staircase tower linking the church hall and vestry.

== History of the congregation ==
The current congregation consists of the union of three former separate congregations. The church was built to be used as the parish church of the Partick East congregation, which was founded in September 1863. The congregation was founded as a parish of the United Presbyterian Church, but which became part of the United Free Church of Scotland when the Free Church of Scotland and the United Presbyterian Church united in 1900. Upon union with the Church of Scotland, the congregation became a parish of the Church of Scotland serving the east side of Partick.

In 1984, with the closure of Dowanhill Parish Church, which was the original and first church congregation in Partick, the Dowanhill congregation merged with the East Partick congregation forming East Partick and Dowanhill Parish Church. A further union took place in 1990, when the congregation of Old Partick Church united with East Partick and Dowanhill, forming Partick Trinity Parish Church.
