= Olga da Polga =

Fictional guinea pig

- Genre: Series, Book
- Starring: Julie Wilson Nimmo, Greg Hemphill. (Books written by Michael Bond)
- Country of origin: United Kingdom
- Original language: English
- No. of series: 2

Original release
- Network: CBeebies; BBC iPlayer
- Release: 2022-present

Olga da Polga is a fictional guinea pig, who is the heroine of a BBC television series for CBeebies and a series of books for children.

The books were written by Michael Bond and published between 1971 and 2002. Unlike Bond's more famous character, Paddington Bear, Olga is a teller of tall tales in the style of Baron Munchausen. The typical plot of each story is that something fairly ordinary happens to Olga, and she gives her animal friends a wildly exaggerated version of events, subsequently revealed to be untrue by what the humans say.

Bond's books were memorably illustrated by Danish artist Hans Helweg, who was also well known for his "pulp fiction" covers for Pan paperbacks. His illustrations are still strongly associated with Olga, although later editions have used different imagery including artwork by Catherine Rayner for Usborne.

Olga was named after the Bond family's real guinea pig. In 2014, Guardian journalist Michelle Pauli met Olga number six.

== Television series ==
In 2022, the BBC commissioned 13 episodes of a live-action televisions series of Olga da Polga for CBeebies, featuring Julie Wilson Nimmo and Greg Hemphill. A second series aired in 2023 on the channel.

== Books ==
=== Chapter books ===
- 1971 The Tales of Olga da Polga
- 1973 Olga Meets Her Match
- 1976 Olga Carries On
- 1982 Olga Takes Charge
- 1987 The Complete Adventures of Olga Da Polga (omnibus)
- 1993 The Adventures of Olga Da Polga (omnibus)
- 2001 Olga Moves House
- 2002 Olga Follows Her Nose
- 2002 The Best of Olga Da Polga (omnibus)

=== Picture books ===
- 1975 Olga Counts Her Blessings
- 1975 Olga Makes a Friend
- 1975 Olga Makes a Wish
- 1975 Olga Makes Her Mark
- 1975 Olga Takes a Bite
- 1975 Olga's New Home
- 1975 Olga's Second House
- 1975 Olga's Special Day
- 1983 The First Big Olga da Polga Book (omnibus)
- 1983 The Second Big Olga da Polga Book (omnibus)

== Characters ==
- Olga – the protagonist of the stories.
- Karen Sawdust – Olga's owner and caretaker. As a child, she seems to understand Olga better than her parents.
- Mrs. Sawdust – Karen's mother (Played by Julie Wilson Nimmo in the CBeebies series)
- Mr. Sawdust – Karen's father. Built Olga's home. (Played by Greg Hemphill in the CBeebies series)
- Noel – Karen's pet black cat. He is sly and knowledgeable in the ways of the world, as he is free to enter and leave the house as he pleases. Although he claims to not believe most of Olga's tales, he still listens to them often.
- Graham – a tortoise. Dislikes being picked up and set down upside down. He's very slow, but often has a unique way of viewing the world.
- Fangio – a hedgehog with Argentine blood. He often stays in a box in the Sawdust's garage, and enjoys a meal of bread soaked in milk. He often goes to the Elysian Fields (a patch of waste land beyond the shrubbery).
- Boris – Olga's boyfriend. He lives by the seaside, and is also the father of Olga's children. He watches too much TV, but this makes him a very good storyteller. He rivals Olga in the storytelling department.
- Fircone and Raisin – two hamsters that Karen buys later. Although Olga is initially jealous of them, as they are kept in Karen's room and seem to be her favourites, she quickly warms up to them. They bite Noel when he tries to sneak up on them, which earns Olga's respect, as she admires them for standing up to Noel, small as they are.
- Venables – a toad who lives in a pond in the Sawdust family's garden.

== See also ==
- Peter Gurney, a guinea pig specialist who cared for Michael Bond’s pet.
