= Paul "Jesus" Monroe =

Paul "Jesus" Rovia
- The Walking Dead character
- From left to right: Jesus, as he appears in the comic book series, television series (portrayed by Tom Payne) and video game series
- First appearance: Comic: "Issue #91" (2011); Television: "The Next World" (2016); Video game: "Ties That Bind - Part Two" (2016)
- Last appearance: Comic: "Issue #193" (2019); Television: "Bounty" (2019); Video game: Survivors (2021)
- Created by: Robert Kirkman; Charlie Adlard
- Adapted by: Scott M. Gimple; Angela Kang; Corey Reed
- Portrayed by: Tom Payne
- Voiced by: Brandon Keener (video game)

In-universe information
- Occupation: Recruiter for the Hilltop Colony; Comic: Recruiter for the Alexandria Safe-Zone; Member of the Herd-Duty Crew; Farmer; Television: Supply Runner and Martial Arts Teacher for the Hilltop Colony; Member of the Militia; Leader of the Hilltop Colony
- Significant others: Aaron; Comic: Alex

"Jesus” (real name in the comic book series: Paul Monroe; real name in the television series: Paul Rovia) is a fictional character from the comic book series The Walking Dead, as well as the television series of the same name, where he is portrayed by Tom Payne.

Jesus served as the ambassador for The Hilltop and frequently searches for new recruits. The recruiting process is largely motivated to help their community fight against Negan and the Saviors. In both media, Jesus becomes Maggie’s right-hand-man as she succeeds Gregory as the leader of The Hilltop. Jesus was killed in the midseason finale of season nine by an unknown member of the Whisperers who will become the main antagonists going forward in the television series. The character's surname is changed to Rovia to avoid confusion with the unrelated character, Deanna Monroe, who was based on the also unrelated character, Douglas Monroe, from the comics.

== Comic book series ==
Paul is introduced spying on the Alexandria Safe-Zone community shortly following the horde invasion. Paul is later attacked by Michonne and Abraham Ford where he easily immobilizes them. After insisting on meeting Rick Grimes, he is knocked out and tied up. After the interrogations, Rick eventually decides to let Paul take him to Hilltop. On the way, Paul reveals that he could have escaped any time but remained there to see if Rick could be trusted. The two make up and continue on their way. After reaching Hilltop, Paul defends Rick after he kills a citizen who has been sent by Negan to deliver a message. Paul then reveals to Rick and his group, that he and the rest of his people have for months been under siege by the Saviors. He attempts to track them back to their base, but is caught and chased back to the colony.

In the aftermath of Glenn's death at the hands of Negan, he decides to join Rick in his fight against the Saviors and becomes a key member in Rick's decision-making committee. After Rick decides to let go of a captive Dwight, Rick tells Paul to follow him and see what they are up against, but to tell no one of their plans. After gearing up, Paul begins to follow Dwight, hoping to discover the Saviors base of operations. He is later ambushed by three Saviors. As he tries to fight off the Savior trio, he is subdued by one of the members. After being knocked to the floor, Paul is almost killed by the Saviors; however, he is saved by Dwight and another Savior, who tell Paul's attackers to stand down, as they have some "important" questions for Paul. Dwight and the other Savior tie Paul up and load him onto a jeep. They drive to Sanctuary, allowing Paul to get a good look at the area and he bails out of the jeep at the very last second, narrowly avoiding capture and reports it back to Rick. He introduces Rick to Ezekiel, the leader of the Kingdom, in the hopes of forming the three communities into standing against the Saviors. As he sneaks into the Hilltop to tell Maggie of Rick's plan, he learns that Kal betrayed him and ran off to inform the Saviors of their plan in which Jesus catches up to him and convinces him to change his mind. He continues to recruit members of the Hilltop, much to Gregory's dismay.

Later, as Negan holds Rick, Nicholas, Heath & Holly hostage for attempting to kill him, Jesus arrives at the Safe Zone, hidden away from Negan and his men. He then grabs a Savior by his foot and trips him over. The Saviors open fire, but instead of hitting Paul they kill the Savior. Negan tells them to hold fire and at that moment Paul throws himself at the nearest Savior and orders Rick, Heath, Holly, and Nicholas into a trench. He proceeds to fight the Saviors until he works his way to Negan, whom he disarms and captures. Negan frantically tells the Saviors to hold fire and Paul issues an order to let the survivors go and threatens to kill Negan. He tells Paul that even if he were to succeed, the Saviors would still open fire and kill Paul. However it is revealed that Paul's intentions were to stall the Saviors until Ezekiel and his soldiers arrive. Jesus continues to aid Rick and Ezekiel in their fight against the Saviors until Negan is defeated.

Two years after Negan's incarceration, Jesus acts as Maggie's second-in-command at the Hilltop, while still making periodic visits to Alexandria.

== Television series ==
In July 2014, Robert Kirkman confirmed that Jesus would recur in future seasons of the show. Tom Payne was cast as Paul Rovia in September 2015.

=== Season 6 ===
Jesus makes his debut in the episode "The Next World," first seen bumping into Rick who is on a supply run with Daryl. Jesus pulls a smooth-talking con on them, pick-pocketing keys from Rick and planting the idea of approaching walkers in their mind so that they react predictably when firecrackers he had set go off, allowing him to drive off with their truck of supplies. When attacked by Rick and Daryl later, Jesus is able to physically defend himself, displaying impressive combat abilities, though he surrenders when they threaten him at gunpoint. Jesus is bound at his wrists and ankles and left at the side of the road but in seconds is able to free himself and climb onto the truck unobserved. Later, when they realize he is on the truck and slam on the brakes, Jesus takes a considerable fall at speed but is immediately able to get up and run, outpacing Daryl who gives chase. Jesus gets into the truck where he is fought by Daryl, and grabs Daryl's gun in order to kill a walker that would have otherwise attacked Daryl from behind. Daryl pulls Jesus from the truck, which accidentally releases its brakes, and Jesus is knocked unconscious in the process of the truck rolling backwards into a lake. Jesus is brought back to Alexandria and despite being bound in a locked room in a guarded house, Jesus is able to free himself and escape confinement without raising an alarm, and identify and infiltrate Rick's home where he asks to speak with Rick.

In the following episode, "Knots Untie", Jesus is humble about his impressive escape, saying that, "Knots untie, locks get picked, entropy comes from order," suggestive of a philosophy that seeks harmony rather than control. While he was free, Jesus located, infiltrated and took an accounting of Alexandria's armory and food supplies, and an estimate of their population. Noting that they are low on provisions, he suggests they trade with his community and takes them to The Hilltop. When Gregory, The Hilltop's leader, tries to get the upper hand on the Alexandrians who might face starvation without their food, Jesus works his influence to convince The Hilltop that being charitable with the Alexandrians in their time of need and building a relationship of trust and respect will pay back far more in the future than this single exchange. Jesus also intercedes when Rick and his group stop an assassination attempt on Gregory instigated by Negan, preventing further bloodshed. The Hilltop has suffered considerably from The Saviors' extortions, and while they did not have enough fighters or ammunition to move against Negan and his gang, Jesus readily volunteers to join when Daryl and the group offers to take out Negan and rescue Craig, a Hilltop hostage.

In the episode "Not Tomorrow Yet", Jesus is shown to have joined Rick's attack on the Savior's compound. He later comforts Tara who is feeling guilty about lying to Denise and her experiences when she was last involved in an attack on a community of survivors. Jesus tells Tara that it is her love for Denise which gives her a reason to fight. When gunfire breaks out, Jesus and Tara both urge Andy and Craig to leave, to ensure The Hilltop is not connected to the attack on the Saviors, though Jesus dons his mask and rushes in with confidence that the Saviors will never see him. He is later seen saving Glenn and Heath from a dying Savior by shooting him before stating "So this is the next world."

=== Season 7 ===
Jesus first appears in the fifth episode of the season, "Go Getters", where he attempts to comfort Maggie and Sasha (who are hiding in the Hilltop from Negan) on their lost loved ones. Gregory decides that the two of them must leave and when Jesus disagrees, Gregory states he is free to go with them. Sasha later tells Jesus that he should be in charge of the community, though he insists that he just tries to help, Sasha tells him he might have to do more. When the Hilltop is attacked by walkers let in by the Saviors, Jesus helps Sasha fend them off (once again showing off his impressive skills in hand-to hand combat) while Maggie destroys the car system drawing them in. The next day, Jesus continues to argue with Gregory as he refuses to turn away Maggie (who is pregnant) as well as Sasha as the two helped save them. When Simon, one of the head Saviors, arrives at the Hilltop, Gregory attempts to turn over the two, but is foiled by Jesus hiding them elsewhere. When confronted about it, Jesus tells him they are all staying and though he does not want to be in charge, Gregory will not be either. The episode ends with Jesus sneaking aboard one of the Savior's trucks in order to find Negan where he discovers Carl Grimes already there, bent on killing Negan. Jesus briefly appears in the following episode "Sing Me a Song", as he and Carl continue towards the Sanctuary. Jesus uses syrup from the supply shipment to mark a trail for them before suggesting they jump out and continue following on foot as "it's not the fall that gets you. It's fighting it." He then rolls from the truck only to see Carl did not follow him, much to Jesus's amusement. He is later seen on top of a truck as Carl leaves the Sanctuary. He is then seen in "Hearts Still Beating" where he finds Daryl inside the Sanctuary and helps him escape. Jesus is later seen watching Daryl and Maggie reunite with their friends and walks beside them as they go to plan for their fight against the Saviors. The following episode "Rock in the Road" shows Rick and Jesus failing to convince Gregory to fight the Saviors. They do find several members of the community who come forward to volunteer their help. As the group discusses strategies for beating the Saviors, Rick states they need more help, Jesus tells them he knows a group who can help. To this end he brings them to the Kingdom, a flourishing community that are also forced to serve the Saviors. Jesus is shown to be well known there and is on good terms with their leader, King Ezekiel. When Ezekiel refuses to join their fight, Jesus leaves with the others and later returns to the Hilltop with Sasha. "The Other Side" shows Jesus bonding with Maggie and revealing more of his past to her (including that he grew up in a group home and that he is gay) and stating that she and Sasha help him feel more at home. He provides Sasha with a layout of the Sanctuary to help with her plans to kill Negan (though he disagrees with her decision). Jesus is later confronted by Gregory who states he has been shirking his scavenging/scouting duties and has too many people in his trailer. When Gregory mentions that he should show more respect or something may happen with the Saviors constantly coming around, Jesus quickly sees Gregory is threatening him. Gregory denies it, but also claims that he takes care of his friends and that the two of them are not friends. In "Something They Need", Jesus is part of the group Rick takes to a community called Oceanside with the intent of stealing their weapons. Their plan succeeds, but Jesus appears to be conflicted about their actions. In the final season "The First Day of the Rest of Your Life" Jesus is with the group questioning Dwight in the prison cell, Rosita announces that the Saviors have Sasha. She says she does not trust Dwight, but Jesus thinks it may be her only chance to get Sasha back. Jesus reviews Rick's plan with Maggie and Enid while they watch Judith. Jesus arrives with Maggie leading a convoy of the people of Hilltop just in time to join the fight against the Saviors along with the Kingdom, knocking down the Saviors who were about to kill Rick. Maggie and Jesus track down a zombified Sasha in the forest and Maggie's eyes fill with tears when Jesus removes her from her misery. Jesus is present when Rick, Maggie and Ezekiel climb onto a platform and address the crowd as the leaders of their respective communities: Alexandria, Hilltop and The Kingdom, united and ready for all out war.

=== Season 8 ===
Jesus appears in the season premiere "Mercy" where he joins the assembled army of survivors led by Rick, Maggie and Ezekiel in an attack on the Sanctuary. When Negan attempts to divide them by having Gregory order the Hilltoppers to return home, Jesus is unsurprised by the betrayal and confidently states that the Hilltop stands with Maggie. He later splits off with a group to begin attacking the smaller Savior compounds. In "The Damned", Jesus leads a group in taking control of the compound. Unlike Morgan or Tara, who advocate killing all the Saviors, Jesus insists on giving the Saviors a chance to surrender, even when one of them takes advantage of this and tries to kill him. This results in them taking several prisoners despite Tara's objections, stating that Rick will agree with her. "Monsters" shows Jesus and his group leading the prisoners back to Hilltop. This causes conflict with Morgan who believes they should be killed. When the prisoners attempt an escape, the disagreement culminates in a heated fight, eventually ending in a draw and Morgan leaving the group in frustration. Once they arrive at Hilltop, Jesus convinces Maggie to put the prisoners in a pair of trailers under armed guard.

=== Season 9 ===
Jesus remains with the Hilltop community in the year and half following the end of the war with the Saviors, assisting Maggie in running the community.

Following Rick's apparent death, in the six years that follow, Maggie decides to leave Hilltop and join with Georgie and her group, leaving Jesus in charge of Hilltop. Hilltop continues to flourish under Jesus' eye, though struggles with the divide between the Hilltop and Alexandria communities. He frequently takes secret trips to meet with Aaron, and the two develop a relationship while he trains the latter in martial arts. On one of these trips, they find Rosita wounded nearby, and race her back to Hilltop. Rosita mentions that Eugene is still out there before passing out. Jesus joins with Daryl and Aaron to see if they can find Eugene, knowing the area they found Rosita. They discover a herd of walkers behaving strangely but work their way around that to a barn, finding an injured Eugene hiding beneath the floorboards. Eugene warns them this herd is unique, showing intelligence, and the group soon find the herd bearing down on them, and even Daryl is unable to lure them away. They try to take shelter in a walled cemetery but the herd manages to follow. Just then, allies arrive to help open the back gates of the cemetery. Jesus stays back to cover the others' escape, and then turns to take out the last walkers in his way. However, the last walker he faces ducks his blade, turns and grabs him, and then fatally stabs him in the back. The others race in to kill this walker and others, and discover that Jesus' murderer was a human wearing a mask made from walker skin, a "Whisperer". In "Adaptation," Michonne's group escape the cemetery with Jesus' body with Aaron stabbing Jesus in the head to prevent reanimation. Jesus' body is returned to the Hilltop where the residents bury him. Having been Jesus' second-in-command, Tara is made the new leader of the Hilltop in Jesus' stead.

== Video game series ==
Jesus appears in the video game by Telltale Games' The Walking Dead: Season Three, which is set in the comic book universe. It takes place some time during the time skip after All Out War.

Episode 2

Jesus meets Clementine, the former playable character of The Walking Dead: Season Two, and Javier Garcia, who is the playable character of Season Three. He helps them escape a herd of walkers and guides them through a tunnel, using karate as his main attribute. He follows them to find The New Frontier, where Eleanor and Kate have gone to.

Episode 5

When Javier is fighting to save New Richmond with Kate, (determinant) Jesus rides in on a horse, accompanied by two others to fight off the walkers. After all the walkers are taken care of, Jesus and Javier have a conversation, in which Jesus suggests Javier "Do the right thing." He can also be thanked by Gabe, if Gabe is kept alive.

== Reception ==
The Weekly Crisis listed Jesus as #10 in their list of The Ten Best Characters in The Walking Dead, saying: "Being nicknamed after the Son of God seems like an exaggeration, but Jesus has shown time and time again that he is a good, trusting man who just wants what’s best for everyone. The name fits. Even though we’ve only recently been introduced to him, Jesus is quickly showing himself to be one of the book’s greatest characters."

Noel Murray of Rolling Stone ranked Paul 'Jesus' Rovia 14th in a list of 30 best Walking Dead characters, saying, "his phenomenal abilities to avoid detection and escape any trap have justified his moniker as much as his long hair and beard. Paul's biggest weakness is that he prefers to be a provider and facilitator, not a leader, which means that in a roundabout way he's allowed his friends at the Hilltop Colony to be governed by the unqualified Gregory. Bad move."
