= Shooting for Socrates =

2014 film directed by James Erskine

Shooting for Socrates is a 2014 Irish film co-written and directed by James Erskine and starring John Hannah, Richard Dormer and Sergio Mur as Brazilian footballer Sócrates.

== Plot ==
During the 1986 FIFA World Cup the Northern Ireland national football team play against Brazil national football team. The film follows the lives of football supporter Arthur and his son Tommy from East Belfast. The lead up to a notable day in the life of a young boy (his 10th birthday) mirrors the buildup to the big day for the football team.

== Cast ==
- John Hannah as Billy Bingham
- Conleth Hill as Jackie Fullerton
- Richard Dormer as Arthur
- Nico Mirallegro as David Campbell
- Ciaran McMenamin as Sammy McIlroy
- Barry Ward as Jimmy Quinn
- Bronagh Gallagher as Irene
- Paul Kennedy as Pat Jennings
- Chris Newman as Norman Whiteside
- Aaron McCusker as Gerry Armstrong
- Sergio Mur as Sócrates
- Matthew McElhinney as Jimmy Nicholl
- Art Parkinson as Tommy
- Stephen Hagan as Phil Hughes
- Andy Moore as Mal Donaghy
- Patrick Buchanan as Alan McDonald
- Gerard Jordan as Albert Kirk
- Packy Lee as Wigsy
- Maggie Cronin as Landlady

== Production ==
The scenes of the game in Estadio Jalisco in Guadalajara were recreated on Northern Ireland's home turf of Windsor Park in Belfast.

== Release ==
The film had a limited cinema release in June 2015 before being released on DVD in October 2015. It was "DVD of the Week" in the Irish News.

== Reception ==
On review aggregator Rotten Tomatoes, the film holds an approval rating of 29% based on 7 reviews, with an average rating of 4.67/10.
