= Ford Kiernan =

Scottish actor and comedian (born 1962)

- Born: Ford John Kiernan; 10 January 1962 (age 64); Dennistoun, Glasgow, Scotland
- Occupations: Actor; comedian; writer
- Years active: 1990–present
- Known for: Chewin' The Fat; Still Game; Dear Green Place; The Field of Blood; Happy Hollidays

Ford Kiernan (born 1962) is a Scottish actor, comedian and writer. He is best known for his work with Greg Hemphill on the BBC Scotland sketch comedy series Chewin' the Fat (1999–2005) and the sitcom Still Game (2002–2007, 2016–2019). He also starred as Archie Henderson in Dear Green Place (2007–2008) and as Colin Holliday in Happy Hollidays (2009).

Kiernan is one of the executive producers and co–owner of the production company Effingee Productions. The production company has largely created productions in which Kiernan has featured, including Still Game, Chewin' the Fat and Dear Green Place.

== Early life and education ==
Ford Kiernan was born in Dennistoun in 1962. His mother, Frances, raised him and his sister Tracey alone as a single mother after his father left when Kiernan was three years old.

He was educated at Alexandra Parade Primary School and Whitehill Secondary School. Responding to Kiernan's ambition to become a camera operator for STV, a teacher advised him to instead consider becoming an egg packer.

== Career ==
=== Beginnings and comedy ===
Kiernan first performed comedy in 1990 at the comedy club in the basement of the Blackfriars pub in Glasgow. He took up performing full-time in 1993. A run of solo gigs led to his being offered a slot in the Edinburgh Comedy Festival in 1994, in a show called The Best Of Scottish Comedy, alongside John Paul "JP" Leach and Alan Taylor. Leach and Kiernan teamed up as a double act during this festival, and had shows at the next two festivals, After Eight Mince and The Full Bhoona, both at the Gilded Balloon.

Kiernan was one of the first performers at The Comedy Cellar, a comedy night started in 1993 by Ed Byrne in Glasgow. He co-wrote a play with JP Leach, Don't Start Me, which won a Fringe First Award at the 1995 Edinburgh Fringe.

Kiernan has also broadcast frequently on BBC Radio Four and BBC Radio Scotland.

=== Television ===
==== Chewin' the Fat ====
Kiernan's career in television began when he started to write various sketches for Pulp Video (BBC Scotland 1995). Between 1999 and 2005, he was a writer for Chewin' the Fat, starring as a regular character alongside Greg Hemphill, both playing various roles. Karen Dunbar, Paul Riley, and Mark Cox also featured in Chewin' the Fat. Hemphill and Kiernan would become comedy partners, and Riley and Cox would later star alongside Kiernan and Hemphill in Still Game. At first, Chewin the Fat was shown only in Scotland, but the BBC broadcast the third and fourth series throughout the UK.

==== Still Game ====
The spin-off series from Chewin' the Fat, Still Game, began broadcast in Scotland only, but later reached a wider audience throughout the United Kingdom. Every episode of Still Game was co-written by Kiernan and Hemphill. In 1999 and 2000 Kiernan and Hemphill also scripted seven episodes for the children's TV series Hububb, with Kiernan guest-starring in three episodes, including two of them written by other writers. Ford Kiernan, Greg Hemphill and Paul Riley's company Effingee Productions is thought to have split up after Riley walked away to go it alone after being refused more control over the future of the company by Kiernan. Hemphill stated that he didn't want a "boardroom battle". The split ultimately resulted in the indefinite hiatus of the series.

In 2012 actor and playwright Kenny Boyle acquired the rights to the original stage play of Still Game and toured the show, with a new cast, to The Tron theatre, FTH theatre, and The Ayr Gaiety Theatre. The original play had not been staged for 14 years. Kiernan and Hemphill came to see the performances and consequently began considering reviving Still Game officially.

On 15 October 2013, the Daily Record ran a front-page story that the show would be returning. On 23 October 2013, Ford Kiernan and Greg Hemphill announced details of live shows entitled Still Game Live at The SSE Hydro in Glasgow at a press conference. They were scheduled to perform four shows beginning in September 2014, but due to high demand, it was extended to 16 and then 21 shows. On 24 October 2013 Kiernan confirmed in the Daily Record that Kenny Boyle's tour of the original stage show had been one of the instigating factors for Still Game's return. The 21 shows at The Hydro ran from 19 September 2014 until 10 October 2014, played to 210,000 fans and made £6,000,000 in ticket sales. The show received mixed reviews.

On 12 May 2016, the BBC announced that the show would return in 2016 with a six-part seventh series, nine years after the previous series concluded. Filming of the new seventh series started in the summer and the series began on 7 October 2016. The show's return attracted its highest ever overnight audience for a single episode on 7 October, taking a 58% share of the Scottish TV audience with 1,300,000 viewers. The show also aired for the first time on BBC One across the UK nationwide and drew a total audience of 3,200,000. On 16 March 2017, it was announced that an eighth series has been commissioned to air on BBC One with plans to broadcast towards the end of 2017. The series was pushed back to start on 8 March 2018. On 13 July 2018, the BBC announced that Still Game would return for the ninth and final series later in 2019, after which the show will end. Filming for the ninth series started in August 2018 and was completed on 14 September 2018.

In September 2016, a second live show Still Game Live 2: Bon Voyage was announced for the SSE Hydro. The second stage show was to run for ten nights beginning 4 February 2017, but in October 2016, a further five performances were added. Unlike the previous live show, this show was not televised or recorded in any other way. The third and final SSE Hydro live show Still Game: The Final Farewell was officially announced on 1 November 2018, with five shows in September 2019 taking place over three days. A further 5 shows were announced on 2 November.

=== Other television roles ===
In 2007 and 2008 Kiernan starred in Dear Green Place, a BBC One Scotland sitcom about park wardens. The show was co-written by Paul Riley and Rab Christie. In January 2009 Kiernan starred in No Holds Bard, a one-off comedy special shown on BBC Scotland on Burns Night as part of a line-up of special programmes to mark the 250th birthday of Robert Burns.

Kiernan played a caravan park boss in the comedy Happy Hollidays. A pilot episode was shown on BBC 1 in early 2009 and a series was broadcast later in the year. In October 2011 Kiernan played Gordon Brown in The Hunt for Tony Blair, a one-off episode of The Comic Strip Presents...

In 2011 and 2013, Kiernan played George McVie in The Field of Blood. In 2016 he played Felix in Journey Bound.

=== Film roles ===
Kiernan has had several bit-part roles in films. In 1996 he starred alongside Robert Carlyle in Carla's Song and in 2002 he played the role of Black Joke Chief in the Martin Scorsese film Gangs of New York. Kiernan lends his voice to the character of Banjo Barry in the animated film Sir Billi. The film was released in 2012.

In 2012 Kiernan starred in the film Song for Amy. He has also starred in short films such as The Taxidermist and Perfect. In 2020, Kieran played the role of Gavin in the American comedy movie Then Came You, alongside Craig Ferguson who had appeared with Kiernan in Still Game three years earlier.

== Filmography ==
Year	Title	Role
1995	Pulp Video	Various Characters
1995	Ruffain Hearts	Wedding Guest
1996	Rab C Nesbitt	Agent
1997	St Antony's Day Off	Gerry
1997	Space Cadets	Himself
1997	The Slap Boys	Male orderly
1997	The Baldy Man	Various Characters
1997	Rab C Nesbitt	Phil
1998	Och around the Clock	Jack Jarvis
1998	Is It Bill Bailey?	Various Characters
1998	Stand and Deliver	Taxi Driver
1998	Rab C Nesbitt	Mad Dog
1999	Hububb	Inventor
1999	The Debt Collector	Janitor
1999–2005	Chewin' the Fat	Various Characters
2000	The Creatives	Lenny the Bruce
2000	Donovan Quick	Jim Leahy
2001	Randall & Hopkirk	Kiernan
2002	The Last Great Wilderness	Eric
2002	Gangs of New York	Black Joke Chief
2002–2007; 2016–2019	Still Game	Jack Jarvis
2004	Sea of Souls	Sgt Mulgrew
2005	Happy Birthday Broons	Himself – Presenter
2006–2008	Dear Green Place	Archie Henderson
2009	No Holds Bard	Cronie Cameron
2009	Happy Hollidays	Colin Holliday
2011	The Comic Strip Presents	Gordon Brown
2011–2013	The Field of Blood	George McVie
2012	Songs for Amy	Sled Drummer
2012	Sir Billi	Banjo Barry (voice)
2012	The Angels' Share	Station Master
2012	Just Dandy	Himself – Presenter
2014	Inspector George Gently	ACC Hale
2014	Doctors	Dougie McClury
2014	Still Game: Live at the Hydro	Jack Jarvis
2014	Still Game The Story So Far	Himself – Presenter
2016	Journey Bound	Felix
2020	Then Came You	Gavin

=== Theatre ===
Year	Title	Role	Venue
1999	Still Game	Jack	Cottiers, Glasgow, Scotland
2014	Still Game: Live in Glasgow	Jack Jarvis	SSE Hydro, Glasgow, Scotland
2017	Still Game Live 2: Bon Voyage	Jack Jarvis	SSE Hydro, Glasgow, Scotland
2019	Still Game: The Final Farewell	Jack Jarvis	SSE Hydro, Glasgow, Scotland

== Personal life ==
In 2000, Ford headbutted a journalist he believed had insulted his wife. Ford said of the incident: "It was regrettable, it was unfortunate, it was stupid—and it's past." His previous marriage ended with an amicable divorce. In 2005, he admitted assaulting a taxi driver and was fined £3,500. He was again given a fine of £800 for behaving threateningly to a female member of staff at a bar in 2017.

On 6 January 2014, Kiernan's 12-year-old son Sonny was found dead in their family home in Kelvinside. The cause of death was choking. The stage show Still Game Live was dedicated to Sonny later that year. In April of the same year, Kiernan's mother also died.
