= Sir Billi =

2012 British animated film by Sascha Hartmann

- British theatrical release poster
- Directed by: Sascha Hartmann
- Written by: Tessa Hartmann
- Based on: Sir Billi the Vet by Tessa Hartmann
- Produced by: Sascha Hartmann; Tessa Hartmann; Sean Connery
- Starring: Sean Connery; Alan Cumming; Patrick Doyle; Kieron Elliott; Greg Hemphill; Ford Kiernan; Miriam Margolyes; Amy Sacco
- Edited by: Steven Weisberg
- Music by: Patrick Doyle; Shirley Bassey
- Production company: Billi Productions
- Distributed by: Shoreline Entertainment
- Release dates: 13 April 2012 (Sonoma International Film Festival); 13 September 2013
- Running time: 80 minutes
- Country: United Kingdom
- Language: English
- Budget: GB£15 million (US$19 million)
- Box office: $15,838

Sir Billi (also known as Guardian of the Highlands in the US release) is a 2012 British animated comedy adventure film directed by Sascha Hartmann and written by his wife Tessa Hartmann, based on an original story they developed together. Produced by Billi Productions, the film stars the voices of Sean Connery, Alan Cumming, Patrick Doyle, and Kieron Elliott. Set in the Scottish Highlands, the film follows Sir Billi, an elderly veterinarian who, with the help from his friend Gordon the Goat and the townspeople of Catterness, embarks on an adventure to rescue a beaver named Bessie Boo, while also helping her escape from a corrupt police officer. The film is Scotland's first computer-animated feature film. Connery had actually retired in 2006, but eventually joined the film's cast as a favour to the Hartmanns.

Since Connery served the role of the title character, the film makes numerous references to the James Bond films, even down to parodying the opening sequence of The Spy Who Loved Me (1977). It was Connery's first film role since The League of Extraordinary Gentlemen (2003), and his final film role before his death in 2020. The film was originally released on 13 April 2012 by Shoreline Entertainment, premiering at the Sonoma International Film Festival, and was re-released theatrically on 13 September 2013.

The film was critically panned for its plot, character designs, perceived sexist content, animation, and crude humour, with many considering the film to be a sour note on which Sean Connery ended his career. The film was also a box office disappointment as it only earned $15,838.

Not only was it considered to be one of the worst animated films of all time, but there were some critics who went as far to compare it to Foodfight! in terms of quality, claiming it to be one of the most-hated animated films in cinema history.

== Plot ==
Sir William "Billi" Sedgewick is a veterinarian and resides with Gordon, a goat who behaves like a dog, outside the small town of Catterness, located within the Scottish Highlands. On orders of the Scottish government, beavers have become illegal in Scotland and are to be sent to Norway. During one such removal, a lorry carrying a large group of beavers is involved in an accident, letting loose some beavers. The officers in charge of the operation, McKenzie and McTavish, manage to recapture most beavers, but one escapes. The escapee, Bessie Boo, is subsequently adopted by a family of rabbits. McKenzie, posing as a police officer, mounts an obsessive search for Bessie.

Five years pass as McKenzie continues his search for Bessie. Meanwhile, Bessie and the rabbits partake in a tobogganing race. Bessie's adoptive brother, Wee Dave, and their mother fall into a river due to the former's carelessness, leading Bessie to attempt to rescue them. Billi, Gordon, and Billi's grandson, Jake, drive towards Catterness when another rabbit alerts them of the problem. Billi organises a deputation in the town square before noticing McKenzie acting strangely and questioning his identity.

During the group's search, Billi finds and resuscitates Bessie's mother and soon locates Bessie and Dave approaching Baron McToff's dam. McToff, despite his protests, accepts Billi's demands to turn off the turbines. The group manages to rescue Dave, only to miss Bessie. Gordon bungee jumps down to catch Bessie but falls into the river. The group retrieves Gordon, but they are distracted by a submarine. Billi gathers a group to save Gordon with a trampoline, but Gordon gets knocked out. Victoria, a pilot duck assisting with the group's rescue, throws Billi a bottle of water, which he uses to revive Gordon.

Lady Serena, Billi's daughter, hands Bessie to the submarine's pilot, but McKenzie absconds with Bessie. McKenzie then hijacks Billi's Land Rover, causing Billi to give chase in his Aston Martin and eventually on his skateboard across the Highlands. Ending up outside a military base, McKenzie tries to have Billi arrested before they are both confronted by the police. McKenzie is arrested for his crimes, while Billi promises to reunite Bessie with her family. The townspeople celebrate their victory at the Catterness Inn while Bessie gets returned to her mother. Billi and his consort, Toni Turner, leave the celebration to drive off into the moonlight.

== Voice cast ==
- Sean Connery as Sir Billi
- Alan Cumming as Gordon the Goat
- Patrick Doyle as The Admiral
- Kieron Elliott as Arresting Officer
- Greg Hemphill as Mr. McTavish
- Ford Kiernan as Officer MacKenzie and Banjo Barry
- Miriam Margolyes as Baroness Chantal McToff
- Alex Norton as Baron McToff
- Barbara Rafferty as Barbara the Jag
- Amy Sacco as Toni Turner
- Larry Sullivan as Lady Serena
- Ruby Wax as Patti Turner

== Production ==
Originally promoted as the first animated film from Scotland (although by the time it was released, it had lost that honour to The Illusionist (2010), forcing them instead to market it as the country's first computer-animated film) which boasted a rapidly-growing animation industry thanks to investment from both the UK national and Scottish regional governments, the project was able to attract high-profile talents including Sean Connery, Alan Cumming, and one-time Harry Potter composer Patrick Doyle.

== Release ==
Sir Billi was theatrically released on 13 April 2012 at the Sonoma International Film Festival premiere and rereleased on 13 September 2013, three days before the DVD release.

== Reception ==
Sir Billi received extremely negative reviews from critics and audiences. On Rotten Tomatoes, the film holds an approval rating of 0%, based on eight reviews, with an average rating of 2.3/10. On Metacritic, the film has a weighted average score of 17 out of 100, based on 4 critics, indicating "overwhelming dislike".

The negative reaction was widely reported in the British press. Peter Bradshaw of The Guardian rated the film one star out of five, saying that Connery's role "can't lend interest to this tedious, crudely animated, bafflingly conceived cartoon feature […]." He also criticised the story and screenplay, and he calls the movie "so cheaply and unimaginatively made it would hardly pass muster on children's TV." He concluded that "the indulgence Connery has bestowed on this project, as both star and executive producer, has blown a very moderate idea out of all proportion." Peter Debruge of Variety called it "woefully anemic", criticising its "simplistic story and non-sequitur style". Furthermore, he also pointed out a few in-jokes referencing Connery's past role as James Bond, such as a title sequence featuring a Shirley Bassey song that pastiches Bond themes. Siobhan Synnot of The Scotsman called it "mirthless" and "rudimentary". Russ Fischer of SlashFilm criticised it as an "ignominious" end to Connery's career, even compared to his previous film, the critically reviled The League of Extraordinary Gentlemen. Fred Patten of Flayrah called the CG "the ugliest that I have ever seen". Journalist Lisa Summers was also harshly critical of both the CGI and the story. F Bomb Movie Review felt it badly failed to connect with today's children. Evening Standard rates the film also one star out of five, criticising the plot, "hideous CGI, and wannabe sophisticated jokes that cause the greatest pain."

Tracy Moore of Common Sense Media gave the film a 2 out of 4 star rating, writing: "GUARDIAN OF THE HIGHLANDS has a bit of an identity crisis: It's an animated children's movie about saving an endangered beaver but with the winking sultriness at times of a grown-up action movie. It borrows heavily from James Bond in the introduction, action, and treatment of female characters, who are often shown with heaving, exaggerated cleavage. There are some nice ideas about preserving wildlife and endangered species, and the community must work together to save the day against the evil corporation and corrupt officers. And fans of Sean Connery may enjoy his wisecracking role as a veterinarian/skateboarder/ladies' man. But there's a bit of a mishmash of action and jokes here without a lot of meaningful plot development and some iffy portrayals that muddle the positive messages". In his review of the movie's DVD release, Stuart Galbraith IV of DVD Talk criticised the character designs "look singularly rudimentary, unfinished, and thoroughly unreal," especially a "misbegotten" character, Gordon the Goat and the main titular character calling it "deliberately meant to resemble Connery or not, but if so then it's a singularly unflattering caricature." He also criticised the animation for its "singularly ugly computer-generated." Overall, he calls out the film "ugly animation might have been overlooked had the film's story and characters been more charming and interesting, but instead they just add to the film's many problems." Despite the negative reception, AM FM Magazine said Sir Billi was well received on its premiere at the Sonoma International Film Festival.
