= Then Came You (2020 film) =

- Theatrical release poster
- Directed by: Adriana Trigiani
- Written by: Kathie Lee Gifford
- Produced by: Matthew T. Weiner
- Starring: Craig Ferguson; Kathie Lee Gifford; Ford Kiernan; Phyllida Law; Elizabeth Hurley
- Cinematography: Reynaldo Villalobos
- Edited by: Vito DeSario
- Music by: Brett James; Kathie Lee Gifford; Sal Olivari
- Production companies: Whiskey & Wine
- Distributed by: Vertical Entertainment
- Release date: September 30, 2020
- Running time: 97 minutes
- Country: United States
- Language: English

Then Came You is a 2020 American romantic comedy film directed by Adriana Trigiani, from a screenplay by Kathie Lee Gifford. It stars Craig Ferguson, Gifford, Ford Kiernan, Phyllida Law and Elizabeth Hurley.

The film was theatrically released in the United States on September 30, 2020, by Vertical Entertainment.

== Plot ==
Annabelle, a lonely widow, plans a trip around the world, with her husband's ashes in tow, to visit the places they loved in the movies. Eventually, she arrives at the Inn near Loch Fyne, run by Howard, a Scotsman. In the first stop on her planned journey, the two meet and their lives are changed forever with a second chance at love.

== Cast ==
- Craig Ferguson as Howard
- Kathie Lee Gifford as Annabelle
- Ford Kiernan as Gavin
- Phyllida Law as Arlene
- Elizabeth Hurley as Clare

== Production ==
In May 2018, it was announced Kathie Lee Gifford and Craig Ferguson had joined the cast of the film, with Adriana Trigiani directing from a screenplay by Gifford. Brett James would compose original music for the film with lyrics written by Gifford, with the theme song being titled "Love Me to Death" sung by Gifford.

Principal photography began in June 2018.

== Release ==
In September 2020, Vertical Entertainment acquired distribution rights to the film, and set it for a September 30, 2020, one-night theatrical release, before a video on demand release on October 2, 2020.

== Reception ==
On Rotten Tomatoes the film has an approval rating of 47% based on reviews from 17 critics.
