= Jennifer Åkerman =

Swedish model (born 1989)

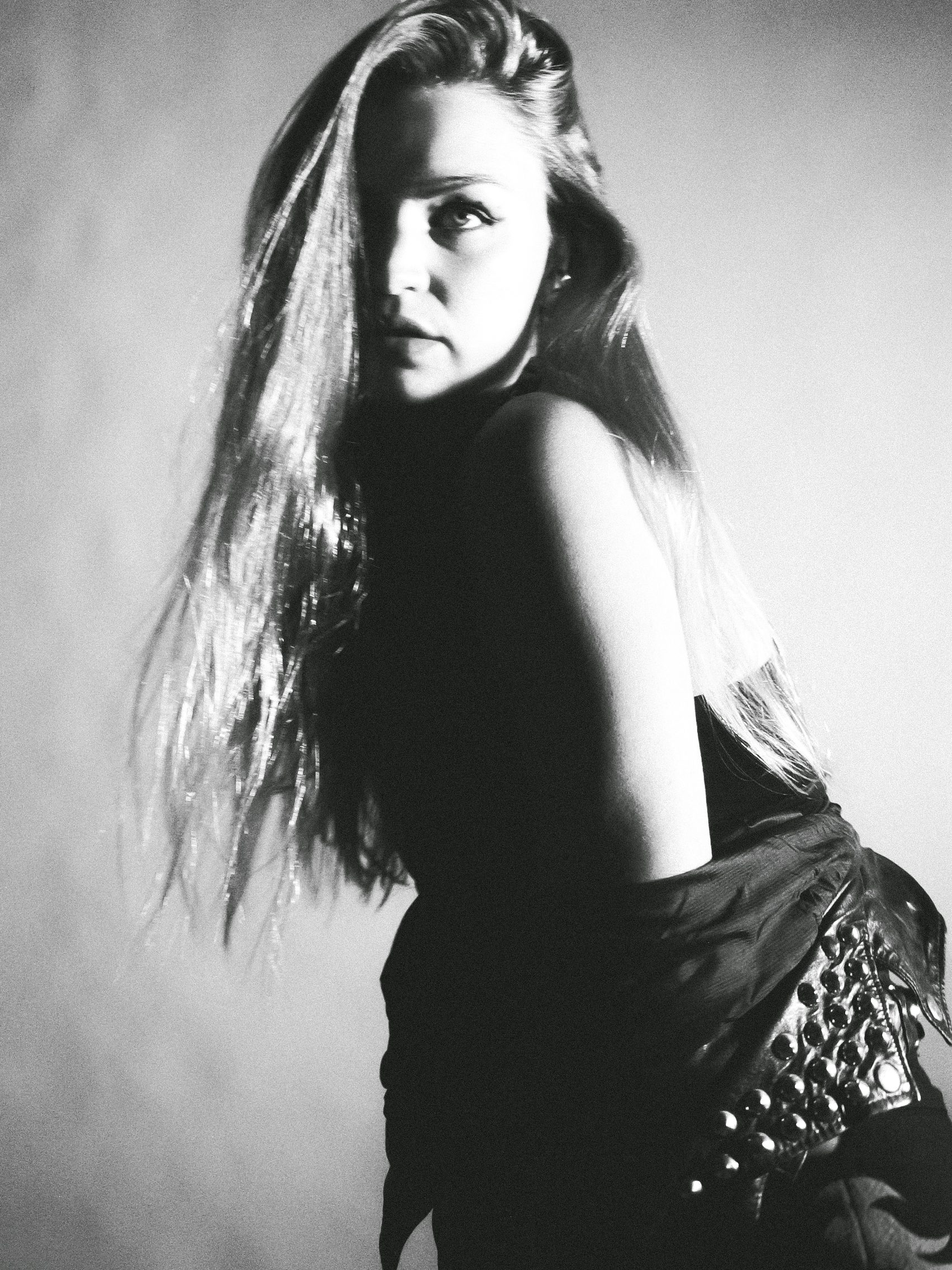
- Jennifer Akerman, Los Angeles 2023
- Born: Jennifer Johanna Åkerman; 10 July 1989 (age 37); Stockholm, Sweden
- Occupations: Model; singer; songwriter
- Height: 1.75 m (5 ft 9 in)
- Spouse: Tom Payne (m. 2020)
- Children: 3
- Relatives: Malin Akerman (half-sister)

Jennifer Johanna Åkerman (born 10 July 1989) is a Swedish model, songwriter and singer. She is the younger half-sister of actress Malin Akerman.

== Biography ==
Åkerman grew up in Stockholm and Skåne. At the age of 18, Jennifer Åkerman moved to Los Angeles and attended college. In the US, she tried acting but was discovered as a model and appeared in magazines and advertising campaigns for various brands. Modeling brought her to New York and increasingly larger modeling jobs.

Alongside modeling, her interest in music took more time and she started singing in the band Bella Tech. Since then, music has played an increasingly important role and she now spends much of her time with her band Bloke & Bird.

At the age of eighteen Jennifer Åkerman moved to Los Angeles and studied at college. She tried acting but was discovered by a modeling agency and has modelled for several brands and commercials. The modeling brought her to New York City and more modeling work. At the same time, she started singing for the band Bella Tech, before forming the duo Bloke & Bird with Lorenzo Jansson Kilman. In 2022, she released her solo album Monster under the name Final Child.

Åkerman participated as a celebrity dancer in the celebrity dancing show Let's Dance 2013 which was broadcast on TV4. She has blogged for Veckorevyn, Chic and now Metro Mode.
