= Jayd Johnson =

Scottish actress

- Born: 18 December 1990 (age 35); Glasgow, Scotland
- Years active: 2001-present
- Height: 5 ft 2 in (1.57 m)

Jayd Johnson (born 18 December 1990) is a Scottish actress best known for her portrayal of Nicki Cullen in River City and her BAFTA-winning role as Paddy Meehan in The Field of Blood.

== Career ==
Johnson began attending drama classes aged eight and landed her first professional acting job at 11 in the film Dear Frankie, starring Emily Mortimer and Gerard Butler. From the age of 13, Johnson played Nicki Cullen in the Glasgow-set soap opera River City. She left in 2010, after six years, to train at the American Academy of Dramatic Arts in New York before returning to Scotland after being hand-picked for the lead role of Paddy Meehan in BBC Scotland's adaptation of The Field of Blood for which she won the 2011 BAFTA Scotland Award for Best Television Actor/Actress ahead of co-stars Peter Capaldi and Ford Kiernan. Johnson reprised the role of Paddy Meehan for The Field of Blood: The Dead Hour which began filming in Glasgow in November 2012 and was broadcast on BBC One in August 2013.

== Personal life ==
The youngest of three children, Johnson grew up in Rutherglen, Lanarkshire and was educated at the local Stonelaw High School.

Her parents Connie and Johnny own and run a café in the Forge Market in the east end of Glasgow. She has a sister and brother. She is married and lives in British Columbia, Canada.

== Theatre ==
Year	Title	Role	Company	Director	Notes
2014	The Bondagers	Liza	Lyceum Theatre, Edinburgh	Lu Kemp	play by Sue Glover

Other theatre credits include This Wide Night and Cooking with Elvis (Tron Theatre, Glasgow).

== Filmography ==
2004 Dear Frankie as Catriona

2004–2010 River City (TV series) as Nicki Cullen

2011 The Field of Blood as Paddy Meehan
