= The Field of Blood (TV series) =

Scottish television drama series (2011–2013)

- DVD cover
- Genre: Crime drama
- Created by: Denise Mina
- Written by: David Kane
- Directed by: David Kane
- Starring: Jayd Johnson; Matt Costello; Bronagh Gallagher; Ford Kiernan; Kesley Griffin; David Morrissey; Brian Pettifer
- Country of origin: Scotland
- Original language: Scots/English
- No. of series: 2
- No. of episodes: 4 (list of episodes)

Production
- Executive producers: Andrea Calderwood; Gaynor Holmes
- Producer: Alan J Wands
- Running time: 60 mins.
- Production company: Slate Films North

Original release
- Network: BBC One; BBC One HD
- Release: 8 May 2011 – 9 August 2013

The Field of Blood is a Scottish crime drama television series, broadcast between 8 May 2011 and 9 August 2013, adapting the novels of Denise Mina. Jayd Johnson stars as the protagonist, Paddy Meehan, working for a Glasgow newspaper in the 1980s.

== Plot ==
The first series of The Field of Blood adapts the novel of the same name, which is set in 1982. This series comprised two episodes, broadcast on BBC One on 8 and 9 May 2011, respectively. The second series adapts the follow-up novel, The Dead Hour, which is set later in the same decade. The second series was commissioned by the BBC in 2012, again containing two episodes, which aired on 8 and 9 August 2013, respectively. Set in Glasgow, Scotland, in 1982, a young female reporter sees an opportunity for a riveting story for her slowly dying city newspaper when a young boy is kidnapped from a Glasgow park and later is found murdered. She sees connections to a year-old prior murder with similar characteristics that nobody else wants to see, and she is determined to connect them and convince the police.

== Reception ==
Time Out gave the second series four out of five stars and said "It’s good to see this grubby Glaswegian crime drama get another run – it slipped under the radar somewhat when it first appeared in 2011." Sarah Hughes of The Independent said "While the television version of The Field of Blood lacks the sense of human fraility of the Denise Mina books on which it's based, occasionally seeming clunky in comparison, its great strength lies in the accurate portrayal of a distant, darker time." Sarah Rainey of The Daily Telegraph also gave it four out of five stars and said "The opening half was bleak but authentic, from the clack-clack of the Olympia typewriters to the obligatory Irn Bru advert. ... The camerawork was clever – just the right amount of jumpy hand-held shots and haunting close-ups – and the dialogue was witty."

Sarah Hughes, also writing for The Guardian, called the first series "impressive" and said it was "a cut above the usual summer schedule-filling fare." Lucy Mangan, another journalist for The Guardian said "this potent brew of corruption, conflict and car coats is nevertheless a waste of David Morrissey's talents" when talking about the second series.

== Cast ==
=== Main cast ===
- Jayd Johnson as Paddy Meehan
- Matt Costello as Con Meehan
- Bronagh Gallagher as Trisha Meehan
- Ford Kiernan as George McVie
- Kelsey Griffin as Mary Ann Meehan
- David Morrissey as Murray Devlin
- Brian Pettifer as Father Richards

=== Recurring cast ===
==== Series 1 ====
- Jonas Armstrong as Terry Hewitt
- Peter Capaldi as Dr. Pete
- Alana Hood as Heather Allen
- Stephen McCole as Danny Ogilvey
- Gavin Mitchell as Henry Naismith
- Derek Riddell as D.S. Mickey Patterson
- William Ruane as D.C. Colin McGovern

==== Series 2 ====
- Ron Donachie as D.C.I Thomas Sullivan
- Michael Nardone as D.I. Michael Gallagher
- Stuart Martin as D.C. Dan Burns
- David Hayman as Red Willie McDade
- Amy Manson as Karen Burnett
- Katherine Kelly as Maloney
- Andrew Sloey as Daily News Journalist

== Episode list ==
=== Series 1 (2011) ===
No.	Title	Directed by	Written by	Original release date	UK viewers (millions)
1	"The Field of Blood (Part One)"	David Kane	David Kane	8 May 2011	N/A
In 1982, Patricia "Paddy" Meehan, a lowly Irish-Scots Girl Friday at the Glasgow Daily Post, has journalistic aspirations beyond being a copy editor, despite her male colleagues' sexist remarks. When three-year-old Brian Wilcox is murdered, the chief suspect is Calum, Paddy's cousin's ten-year-old son. When details of Calum's family's shock is published in the paper, the family wrongly blame Paddy. Unconvinced of Calum's guilt, Paddy links the murder to that of another little boy, Thomas Dempsie, some years earlier, allegedly killed by his father, Alfie, who has just hanged himself in prison. Paddy interviews Thomas' mother and Alfie's widow, using the name of a colleague, Heather, who is later murdered.
2	"The Field of Blood (Part Two)"	David Kane	David Kane	9 May 2011	N/A
The police interview the journalists following Heather's death. When Paddy tries to persuade them that Brian's murder has the same hallmarks as that of little Thomas Dempsie, whose mother she interviewed using Heather's name, the police are not interested. Paddy speaks to alcoholic veteran hack Pete Walker, who is sure Dempsie never murdered his son. Then, with young reporter Terry, she finds evidence to suggest that mobile grocery van driver Henry Naismith, a witness in the recent case and Dempsie's cellmate, is the culprit; a fact seemingly borne out when she speaks to Calum. Further investigations lead to a dangerous encounter before she gets her wish to become a fully-fledged reporter.

=== Series 2 (2013) ===
No.	Title	Directed by	Written by	Original release date	UK viewers (millions)
3	"The Dead Hour (Part One)"	David Kane	David Kane	8 August 2013	4.06
In 1984, the miners are on strike, and in Glasgow, NUM leader Red Willie McDade is suspected of hiding their assets so that the government cannot freeze them. Paddy Meehan and George McVie, reporters for the Glasgow Daily News, arrive at the scene of a disturbance with police in attendance. However, an Irishman assures the journalists that everything is alright and gives them money to leave. The alleged victim, left-wing lawyer Mhairi (Note: In Gaelic, the letters MH – when they appear together – are pronounced V in English.) Burnett, declines to press charges, but the next day Paddy learns that Mhairi was murdered. Later, the corpse of another lawyer Mark Thillingly, who supported the miners, is pulled from the river. Suicide is assumed, his widow claiming that he had been depressed and behaving oddly before his death. Paddy hands the police the money the Irishman gave her, on which fingerprints of the Irish gangster Lafferty are found – though he is not the man Paddy saw at the house. New editor-in-chief Maloney arrives, announcing redundancies to streamline the paper and make it more populist. Gangsters firebomb the car in which Mcvie is staked out waiting for Meehan.
4	"The Dead Hour (Part Two)"	David Kane	David Kane	9 August 2013	2.43 (overnight)
McVie survives and, with Paddy, establishes that Thillingly was most likely murdered. They visit McDade to ask about his connection to the dead lawyers. He tells them that Mhairi had evidence to expose government dirty tricks in accusing the NUM of fraud, though Maloney presents Devlin with supposed fraud by the union. He realizes that she is colluding with the government to discredit the NUM and boost newspaper sales. Soon afterwards he is beaten up but this incites him to rally the staff to defy Maloney. Paddy and McVie rescue Karen – to whom Mhairi passed on her information – from her abductors, Lafferty and Neilson, the man Paddy saw at Mhairi’s house. They take her to the newspaper office where she reveals the government conspiracy. The News prints a front page exposing the government and police collusion and Maloney is forced to back off. However, Paddy discovers that she is pregnant by married policeman Dan Burns, with whom she had a single encounter in the back of a car.

== DVD ==
The first series was released on DVD on 5 September 2011. A box set of both series was released in the United States on 30 September 2014.
