= Jules and Greg's Wild Swim =

British television series

- Genre: Wild swimming, Documentary, Series
- Created by: Julie Wilson Nimmo, Greg Hemphill
- Starring: Julie Wilson Nimmo, Greg Hemphill
- Country of origin: United Kingdom
- Original language: English
- No. of series: 3
- No. of episodes: 15

Production
- Running time: 30 minutes
- Production company: Solus Productions

Original release
- Network: BBC Scotland; BBC iPlayer, BBC Two
- Release: 3 February 2024 – present

Jules and Greg's Wild Swim is a Scottish television series about wild swimming for broadcast on BBC Two, BBC Scotland and its streaming service BBC iPlayer, featuring couple Julie Wilson Nimmo and Greg Hemphill.

Jules and Greg's Wild Swim was produced by Solus Productions and Jim Webster.

== Plot ==
The series follows Balamory star Julie Wilson Nimmo and Still Game co-creator and star Greg Hemphill as they take the plunge at Scotland's breathtaking and beautiful wild swimming spots, meeting swimmers who share their inspirational stories along the way.

In the final episode of series one, Nimmo returned to Tobermory, where Balamory was filmed.

== Filming and release ==
Filming for series one took place across Scotland in the summer of 2023. It later aired on BBC Scotland channel and began streaming on BBC iPlayer in January 2024. Filming for series two took place again across Scotland in the summer of 2024. It is set to air in January 2025 on BBC Scotland channel and BBC iPlayer.

Series three aired in February 2026, focusing on the South of Scotland.

The show was later aired across England and Wales on BBC Two.
