= A Royal Christmas =

2014 television film directed by Alex Zamm

- DVD cover
- Genre: Holiday romance
- Written by: Janeen Damian; Michael Damian; Neal H. Dobrofsky; Tippi Dobrofsky
- Directed by: Alex Zamm
- Starring: Lacey Chabert; Stephen Hagan; Jane Seymour
- Theme music composer: Chris Hajian
- Country of origin: United States
- Original language: English

Production
- Executive producers: Alexandre Coscas; Francisco Gonzalez; Eric Jarboe; Brad Krevoy; Jimmy Townsend
- Producer: Amy Krell
- Cinematography: Viorel Sergovici
- Editors: Charles Norris; Heath Ryan
- Production company: Brad Krevoy Television

Original release
- Network: Hallmark Channel
- Release: November 21, 2014

A Royal Christmas is a 2014 American holiday romance television film directed by Alex Zamm and starring Lacey Chabert, Stephen Hagan, and Jane Seymour. Written by Janeen Damian, Michael Damian, Neal H. Dobrofsky, and Tippi Dobrofsky, the film is about a young American seamstress from Philadelphia whose boyfriend reveals himself to be a royal prince and heir to the throne of Cordinia. He brings her to his country intending to marry her, to the consternation of the Queen. A Royal Christmas is an original Hallmark Channel movie and first aired on the Hallmark Channel on November 21, 2014.

== Plot ==
Emily Taylor (Lacey Chabert) is a humble and kindhearted seamstress devoted to her family's business in Philadelphia. She is also in love with her European boyfriend Leo James (Stephen Hagan). As the Christmas season approaches, Leo reveals that he is in fact Prince Leopold, heir to the throne of a small sovereign country called Cordinia, which is loosely based on Monaco (but amalgamates the place names, Corsica and Sardinia). He takes Emily back to his country for the Christmas holidays and introduces her to his mother Isadora, Queen of Cordinia (Jane Seymour), who disapproves of the young American immediately. Wanting her son to marry a duchess named Natasha—Leo's ex-girlfriend—whom she finds more suitable than a commoner, the Queen goes out of her way to make Emily feel unwelcome at their castle.

Emily tries to adapt to her new royal surroundings, but feels more comfortable with the castle's butlers and housemaids than she does with her boyfriend's royal family and friends. While in town with Leopold buying Christmas Trees, Emily befriends Poppy, a little orphan girl. Emily is then befriended by Galina, the Baroness of Newbury who she later finds out used to be a commoner like herself. Galina also takes to Poppy right away. The conflict comes to a head when the scheming Queen secretly invites the duchess to the castle for Christmas. With the help of the head butler Victor (Simon Dutton), Emily is schooled in etiquette and then makes a grand entrance at the Christmas ball in a dress she designed herself out of the Queen's old gown. Her happiness is cut short, however, when the Queen discovers her talking with two of the kitchen staff whom she fires immediately. Later, when Leo proposes marriage, Emily, realizing she doesn't fit in, turns down his offer and returns to America.

Sometime later, the Queen realizes all the hurt she's caused and remembers her feelings of love for Victor, whose love she rejected years earlier because he was a commoner. Looking to make up for the hurt that she caused, the Queen accompanies her son and Victor to Philadelphia and watches as Leo proposes once again—and this time Emily accepts. The movie ends with Leopold and Emily's wedding with Poppy in attendance with the Baron and Baroness of Newbury who have presumably adopted her.

== Cast ==
- Lacey Chabert as Emily Taylor
- Stephen Hagan as Leo James/Prince Leopold
- Jane Seymour as Isadora, Queen of Cordinia
- Katherine Flynn as Natasha, Duchess of Warren (Jane Seymour's real daughter)
- Simon Dutton as Victor
- Mitchell Mullen as Bud Taylor
- Katrina Nare as Toni
- Diana Dumitrescu as Olivia
- Vlad Ianus as Will
- Kate Loustau as Galina, Baroness of Newbury
- Ionut Grama as Kent, Baron of Newbury
- Alice O'Mahoney as Poppy
- Annie Gould as Sister Agatha
- Mihai Niculescu as Grand Duke of Canterbury
- Olivia Krevoy as Teenage Girl

== Production ==
A Royal Christmas was filmed on location around Sighişoara, Romania.

== Release ==
A Royal Christmas first aired on Hallmark Channel on November 21, 2014.

== Critical response ==
In her review for The Hollywood Reporter, Allison Keene gave the film a positive review and found the cast—especially Lacey Chabert and Jane Seymour—all "natural and likable". Keene continued:

A Royal Christmas hits all the notes it should in a diverting way: there's an obligatory ball preparation montage, Emily learning how to waltz thanks to Victor, as well as a show-stopping staircase descent. Lessons are learned, snow falls, and love prevails.

Keene concluded that the film is "one part Cinderella, two parts The Princess Diaries, a dash of Wills and Kate, and a pinch of 'win a trip to Downton Abbey'".
