= Jenny Ryan (actress) =

Scottish television and film actress

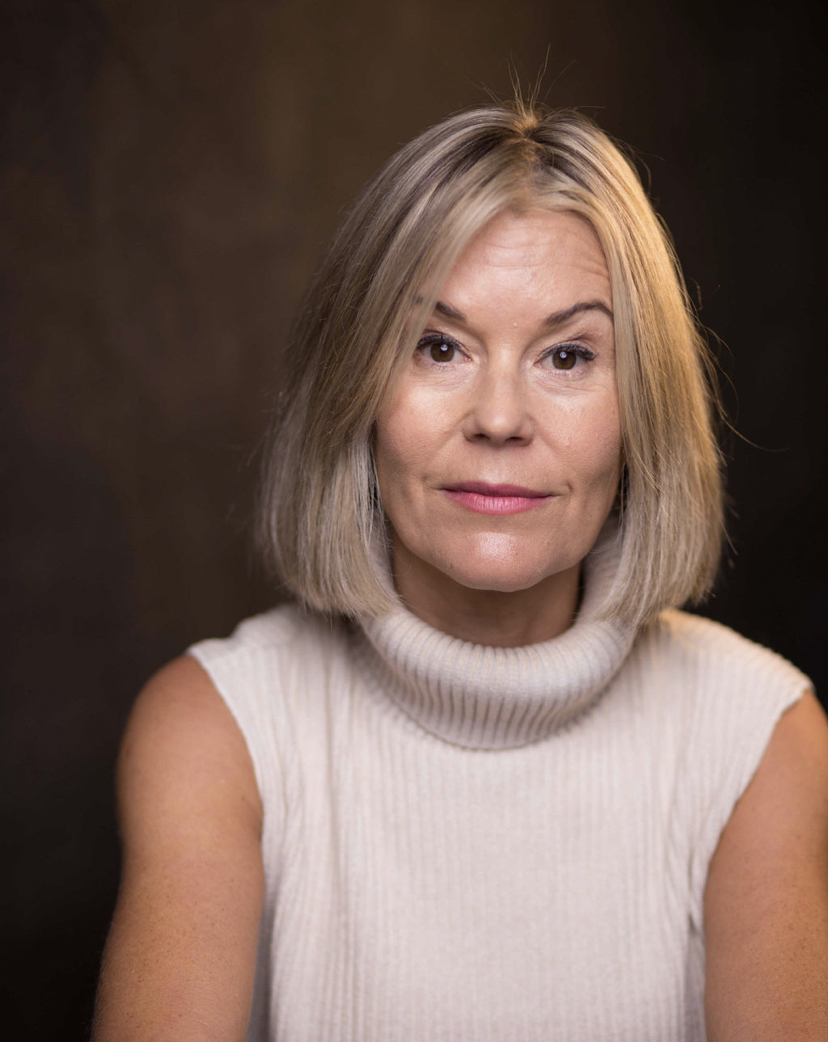
- Jenny Ryan
- Born: 1971 (age 54–55); Scotland
- Occupation: Actress
- Years active: mid-1990s–present
- Known for: River City, The Loch, Clique

Jenny Ryan is a Scottish television and film actress, known for her work in British television dramas and comedies. She has appeared in numerous productions, including River City, Dear Green Place, Waterloo Road, and ITV's crime drama The Loch.

== Career ==
Ryan began her acting career in the 1990s and has since worked in the Scottish and UK television industry. She has appeared in a range of genres, from comedy to crime drama.

=== Selected film and TV appearances ===
Year	Title	Role	Format
2024	An Clò Mòr	Judi	TV series
2023	Piano Man	Hannah	Feature film
2023	A Tin of White	Agnes	Short film
2019	Guilt	DI Elaine Hill	TV series
2018	Clique	Judith Bowen	TV series
2017	The Loch	Nicole Patterson	TV series
2012-13	Woolly and Tig	Tig's mother	Children's TV series
2012-13	Waterloo Road	Sally Stewart	TV series
2008	River City	Tina Hunter	TV series
2007-8	Dear Green Place	Michelle	TV series

Other appearances in Stonemouth, Cracked, Doctors, Taggart, and Rebus

== Personal life ==
She lives in Edinburgh and is married to the photographer Alan McCredie. She continues to work primarily in Scottish and UK television productions.

== See also ==
- List of Scottish actors
- River City (TV series)
