= Happy Hollidays =

- Genre: Sitcom
- Created by: Simon Carlyle & Gregor Sharp
- Written by: Gregor Sharp & Simon Carlyle
- Directed by: Douglas Mackinnon
- Starring: Ford Kiernan; Karen Dunbar; Gavin Mitchell; Kathleen McDermott
- Theme music composer: Ford Kiernan; Dave Murricane
- Opening theme: Happy Holidays
- Ending theme: Happy Holidays
- Composer: Ford Kiernan
- Country of origin: Scotland
- No. of seasons: 1
- No. of episodes: 6

Production
- Executive producer: Ewan Angus
- Producer: Angela Murray
- Running time: 30 minutes
- Production company: Effingee Productions

Original release
- Network: BBC Scotland; BBC One Scotland; BBC Two Scotland
- Release: 4 September – 9 October 2009

Happy Hollidays is a Scottish television sitcom created and written by Simon Carlyle and Gregor Sharp, and broadcast by BBC Scotland. One series of the comedy was commissioned by BBC Scotland and the show was produced by Effingee Productions.

The series stars Ford Kiernan as Colin Holliday, who is the owner of the titular Happy Hollidays, a fictitious caravan site in Scotland; Karen Dunbar as cabaret singer Joyce Mullen; and Gavin Mitchell as rival caravan site owner Mike Bryan. The supporting cast portray the various members of staff on the two caravan sites and the guests. The series follows Colin Holliday running the caravan site, dealing with his guests, whom he sees as a source of revenue and little else, and trying to outwit Mike Bryan, his arch-enemy.

== Cast ==
- Ford Kiernan as Colin Holliday
- Karen Dunbar as Joyce Mullen
- Gavin Mitchell as Mike Bryan
- Anthony Bowers as Dean Bullock
- Kathleen McDermott as Debbi

== Episodes ==
No.	Title	Original release date
1	"The Visit"	4 September 2009
Colin Holliday has opened his own caravan park in Ayrshire. His old rival Mike Bryan comes for an inspection.
2	"Tycoon"	11 September 2009
A rich man comes to the caravan park in order to invest his money. Joyce sells everything she owns on eBay.
3	"Bombs Away"	18 September 2009
Colin Holliday, Dean, Debbie and Mike get trapped in a bomb shelter left over from the Second World War that contains live bombs. Joyce is offered a role in a new period drama.
4	"Mike the Poacher"	25 September 2009
Mike starts to spend time with Joyce, and she leaves Happy Hollidays to work and live in Mike's caravan park, U-tow-pia. Debbi wants to start her singing career at Happy Hollidays.
5	"Donkey"	2 October 2009
When the farmer who owns the land between Colin and Mike's sites dies they each embark on a charm offensive with his daughter. Joyce tries to give up smoking. Dean and Debbi are concerned about the future of the resident donkey at Pets' Corner. Lorraine McIntosh guest-stars.
6	"Wedding Bells"	9 October 2009
Colin and Mike vie to become the new chairman of the caravan site owners' organisation. Joyce devises a secret moneymaking scheme that brings her temporarily closer to Colin. Debbi hears the sound of wedding bells.
