= Karen Dunbar =

Scottish comedian and actress (born 1971)

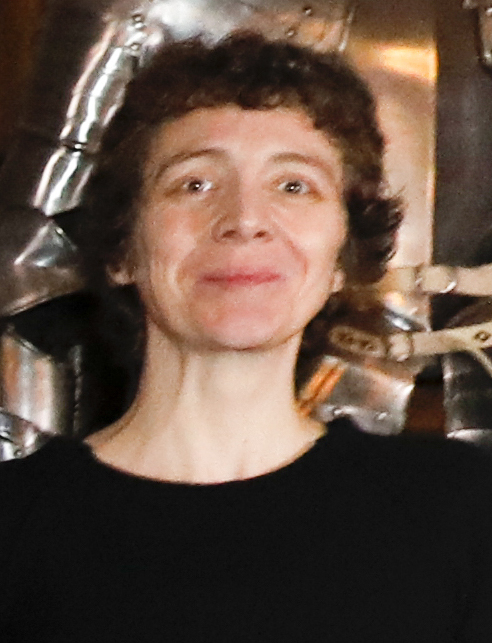
- Dunbar at the Mary Queen of Scots premiere in 2019
- Born: 1 April 1971 (age 55); Ayr, Scotland
- Occupations: Comedian; actress; writer
- Years active: 1997–present
- Known for: Chewin' the Fat; The Karen Dunbar Show

Karen Dunbar (born 1 April 1971) is a Scottish comedian, actress and writer. She first appeared on television on the BBC Scotland sketch comedy series Chewin' the Fat (1999–2005) and was subsequently given her own show by the channel, The Karen Dunbar Show (2003–2006). She voiced Finlay in the 2024 video game Still Wakes the Deep, for which she won the British Academy Games Award for Performer in a Supporting Role.

Her sketch show, The Karen Dunbar Show, received four nominations for the Golden Rose European TV Awards.

== Early life ==
Dunbar was born in Ayr, before moving to Glasgow in the late 1980s following her secondary education. She attended Ayr Academy, and said in a 2023 interview that her biology teacher sketch from Chewin' the Fat was based on her own biology teacher during her time at Ayr Academy.

== Career ==
=== Television ===
Dunbar began her career as a DJ and karaoke host before she attended The Comedy Unit's open auditions in 1997 where she was cast in the BBC Scotland comedy sketch show Chewin' the Fat. She spoke about how she gave up a lucrative income to work fulltime on the show, but after Series 1 aired she struggled financially. She starred in The Karen Dunbar Show, which received two Golden Rose nominations for Best Comedy Show and Dunbar herself two personal nominations for Best Comedy Performance.

Dunbar has presented BBC Radio Scotland series such as Karen Dunbar’s Beautiful Sunday and Karen’s Summer Supplement, as well as being a team captain on the quiz show Step Back in Time. In 2009, Dunbar starred in a six-part series of the Scottish comedy Happy Hollidays. She played the role of Arme Gonnerssen in M.I. High in 2009.

=== Theatre ===
In 2007, Dunbar made her first appearance in pantomime, at the King's Theatre in Glasgow, playing Nanny Begood in Sleeping Beauty. Further pantomime roles include the dual role of the Good Fairy and the Wicked Stepmother in Cinderella (2008–09) and Widow Twankey in Aladdin (2009–10). She appeared as a critic on Britain's Got More Talent on 27 May 2008. She played the fairy godmother in Cinderella (2012–13) and appeared in the 2013–14 season as the Slave of the Ring in Aladdin.

She has also played serious roles, including a performance in the poetic monologue A Drunk Woman Looks at the Thistle adapted by Denise Mina from Hugh MacDiarmid's poem of the same name. Between 2012 and 2016, she was featured in Phyllida Lloyd's trilogy of all-female Shakespeare plays at the Donmar Warehouse, playing Casca in Julius Caesar, Bardolph/Vernon in Henry IV and Trinculo in The Tempest.

=== Stand–up ===
In 2025, Dunbar toured Scotland, and her homecoming show at Ayr Town Hall was broadcast on BBC Scotland in December 2025. Dunbar will embark on a stand–up tour of Scotland entitled Aw Roon the Hooses beginning in September 2026. In November 2026, Dunbar cancelled the remaining dates of her Aw Roon the Hooses tour amid an alleged payment dispute with promoter Breakneck Comedy; Dunbar claimed she was only paid for five performances, while the promoter denied the allegations and attributed the cancellations to low ticket sales.

== Personal life ==
Dunbar is a lesbian. She featured on The Scotsman's "Pink List" of LGBT people contributing to Scotland's cultural life in 2014 and was awarded the Role Model of the Year award at the Icon Awards which celebrate Scotland's LGBTI community in 2015. She spoke about her experiences of homophobia and the acceptance she found in Glasgow's LGBT community in a BBC documentary, I Belong to Glasgow, screened in 2014. She spoke in 2016 about her plans to marry her female partner. In 2018, Dunbar gave a TED talk in Glasgow, in which she spoke briefly about her recovery from a challenging upbringing, prior alcoholism and a change in her comedic style, which she later reverted.

== Filmography ==
=== Television ===
Year	Title	Role	Notes
1998	Rab C. Nesbitt	Stern Woman / Cowgirl	2 episodes
1999–2005	Chewin' the Fat	Various Roles	Regular appearances
2003–2006	The Karen Dunbar Show	Various Roles	Also co-writer
2007	An Audience with...	Guest	
2008	Britain's Got More Talent	Guest Critic	28 May 2007 episode
2009	Happy Hollidays	Joyce Mullen	Six part television series
2012	M.I. High	Arme Gonnerssen	
2014	XX Commonwealth Games broadcast	Lead Compere	Alongside John Barrowman, opening ceremony only
2017	The Late Show with Ewen Cameron	Guest	
2017	River City	Francesca Simpson	Episode: 10 October 2017
2022	Breaking the News	Guest Panellist	2 episodes
2025	Karen Dunbar Live from Ayr	Herself	BBC Scotland television special

=== Film ===
Year	Title	Role	Notes
2000	Rice Paper Stars	Herself	
2018	Mary Queen of Scots	Commoner	Cameo appearance

=== Video games ===
Year	Title	Role	Notes
2024	Still Wakes the Deep	Finlay	Won the BAFTA Game Award for Performer in a Supporting Role.

== Theatre credits ==
Year	Title	Role	Notes
2007	Sleeping Beauty	Nanny Begood	
2008–2009	Cinderella	Good Fairy / Wicked Stepmother	
2009–2010	Aladdin	Widow Twankey	
2012	The Guid Sisters	Rose Ouimet	
2012	Cinderella	Fairy Godmother	
2013–2014	Aladdin	Slave of the Ring	
2015–2017	Henry IV	Vernon	
2019	Calendar Girls	Cora	UK tour
2019	Still Game: The Final Farewell	God	
