= Cottiers, Glasgow =

Theatre in Glasgow, Scotland

Cottiers Theatre
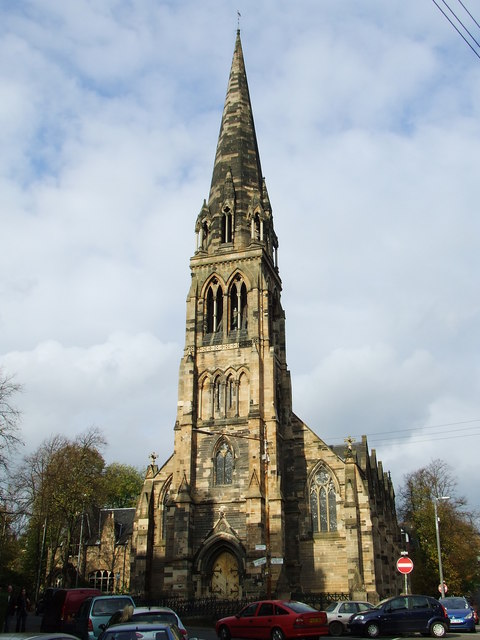
- Interactive map of Cottiers Theatre
- Former names: Dowanhill Parish Church
- Address: 93–95 Hyndland St
- Location: Glasgow, Scotland
- Coordinates: 55°52′26″N 4°18′06″W
- Public transit

Listed Building – Category A
- Designated: 15 December 1970
- Reference no.: LB32879

Construction
- Built: 1865–1866
- Opened: 1866 (as a church)
- Closed: 1984 (as a church)
- Architect: William Leiper

Website
- Website

Cottiers is a theatre located in Glasgow, Scotland. It also operates as a bar and restaurant. Cottiers occupies the building of the 19th-century former Dowanhill Parish Church.

== Early years of the church ==
The church building was built to serve as the parish church of the Dowanhill United Presbyterian Church. It was designed in the Neo-Gothic style by William Leiper, and was built between 1865 and 1866. The foundation stone was laid on 4 August 1865 and the building was opened on 11 November 1866. The congregation became part of the Church of Scotland in 1929, and the church was renamed Dowanhill Parish Church.

== Works of art ==
The building includes a collection of notable frescoes and stained glass windows by Daniel Cottier. The building was renamed in honour of Cottier after the church was converted into a theatre.

== Closure, conversion and present use ==
The church served as a parish church of the Church of Scotland until 1984, when the Dowanhill congregation united with the East Partick congregation forming East Partick and Dowanhill Parish Church. That same year, the church building was bought by the Four Acres Charitable Trust which converted the building into a theatre, an arts centre with a bar and restaurant. The building was restored during numerous phases starting from the 1980s and going as far as 2012.
