= Tom Payne (actor) =

English actor

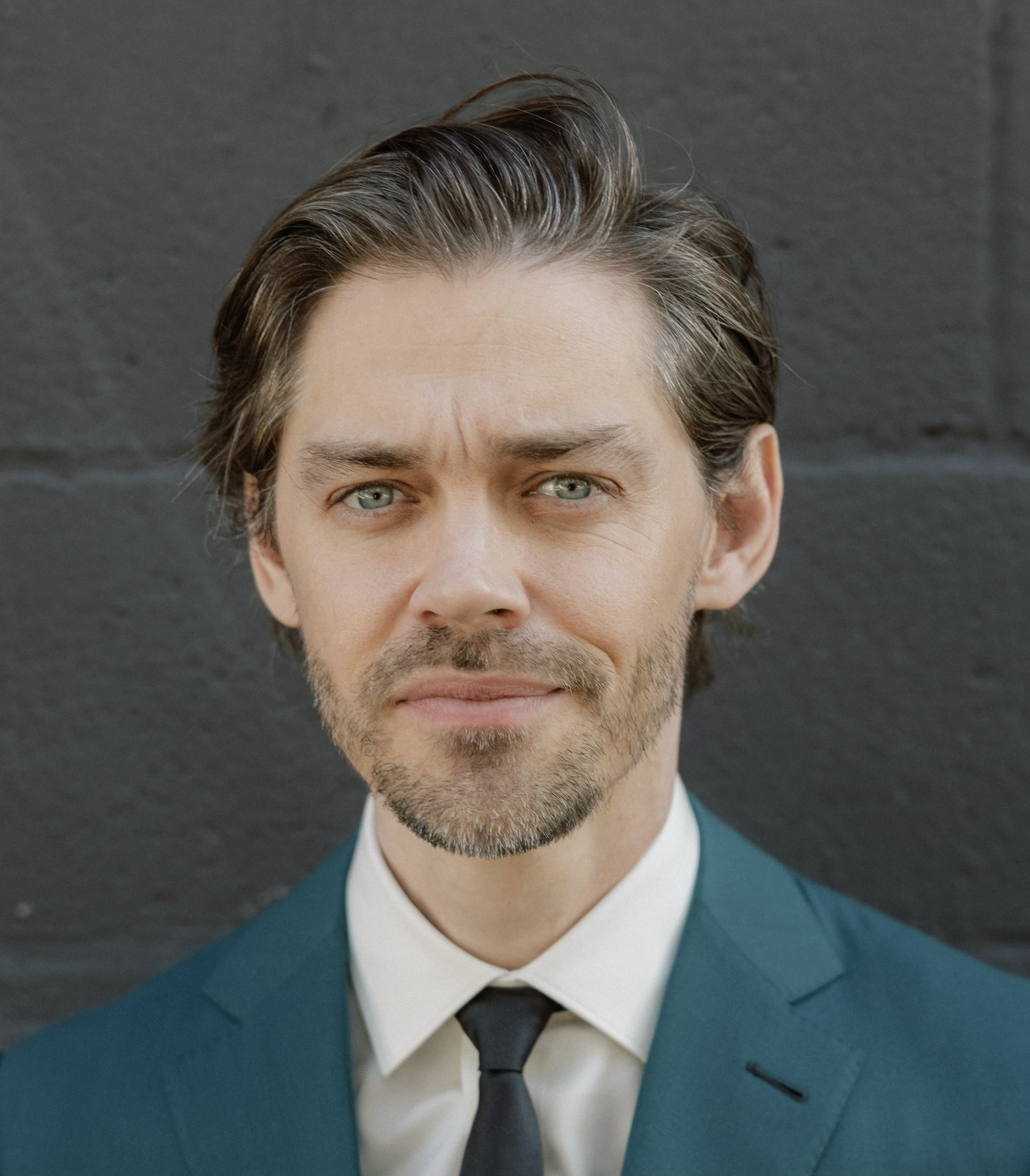
- Born: 21 December 1982 (age 43); Chelmsford, Essex, England
- Education: Royal Central School of Speech and Drama
- Occupation: Actor
- Years active: 2005–present
- Spouse: Jennifer Åkerman (m. 2020)
- Children: 3
- Relatives: Will Payne (brother)

Tom Payne (born 21 December 1982) is an English actor. He is known for appearing on AMC's The Walking Dead as Paul "Jesus" Rovia, and BBC's Waterloo Road as Brett Aspinall. He portrayed Malcolm Bright on the American television series Prodigal Son from 2019 to 2021. Payne also currently has a recurring role in Law & Order: Organized Crime.

== Early life ==
Payne grew up in Bath, Somerset, where he attended King Edward's School and was a prolific contributor to the school's drama department. He attended the Royal Central School of Speech and Drama, graduating in June 2005.

== Career ==
In January 2007, he first appeared in Waterloo Road for the BBC, playing sixth former Brett Aspinall. Despite being 24 at the time, Payne portrayed a 17-year-old character. He remained in the series until the end of the following season in March 2008. It was revealed afterwards that he would not be returning for the new season. Between season 1 and 2 he filmed Miss Pettigrew Lives for a Day and Skins and was named one of Screen International's Stars of Tomorrow 2007.

After leaving Waterloo Road Payne played George Best in Best: His Mother's Son, a BBC Two film about the legendary footballer. In the same year he appeared in Marple: They Do It With Mirrors and Wuthering Heights for ITV.

On 8 March 2010, it was announced that Tom had joined the cast of Luck a new pilot for HBO directed by Michael Mann, written by David Milch, starring Dustin Hoffman and Nick Nolte. He played the role of a Cajun jockey.

In 2012, he was cast in the title role of The Physician (based on the book of the same name) alongside Stellan Skarsgård and Ben Kingsley.

His career defining role came when he was cast with a recurring role in Season 6 of The Walking Dead, as Paul "Jesus" Rovia, and promoted to series regular for season 7. He played the character until midway through season 9.

In 2019, Payne was cast in the lead role as a serial killer's son in the Fox police procedural series Prodigal Son.

== Personal life ==
Payne began dating singer Jennifer Åkerman in late 2013. He announced on an episode of Walking Dead that they had become engaged. Åkerman later revealed on her Instagram that they married on 21 December 2020 after postponing their wedding due to COVID-19. They had a son, born on 5 January 2022 and twins on 1 April 2024.

His younger brother Will Payne is also an actor.

== Filmography ==
=== Film ===
Year	Title	Role	Notes
2008	Miss Pettigrew Lives for a Day	Phil Goldman	
2009	Into the Rose-Garden	Sam	Short film
2011	The Task	Stanton	
2011	Generation Perdue	Toby Perdue	Short film
2012	The Inheritance	Matthew	
2012	My Funny Valentine	Zander	
2012	Still Young	Edward	Short film
2013	The Physician	Rob Cole	
2015	Winter	Tom	
2015	MindGamers	Jaxon	
2017	It's No Game	East	Short film
2019	IO	Elon	Voice role
2024	Imaginary	Max	
2024	Horizon: An American Saga – Chapter 1	Hugh Proctor	
2024	Horizon: An American Saga – Chapter 2	Hugh Proctor	
2025	The Physician 2: The Return	Rob Cole	

=== Television ===
Year	Title	Role	Notes
2005	Casualty	Toby Tyler	Episode: "Love and Duty"
2007	Skins	Spencer	Episode: "Effy"
2007	Miss Marie Lloyd	Bernard	Television film
2007–2008	Waterloo Road	Brett Aspinall	Recurring role; 30 episodes
2008	He Kills Coppers	Jonny Taylor	Television film
2009	Wuthering Heights	Linton	2 episodes
2009	Miss Marple	Edgar Lawson	Episode: "They Do It with Mirrors"
2009	Best: His Mother's Son	George Best	Television film
2009	Beautiful People	Mr. Carr	Episode: "How I Got My Plumes"
2010	The People vs. George Lucas	Himself	Documentary
2011–2012	Luck	Leon Micheaux	9 episodes
2014	New Worlds	Monmouth	4 episodes
2016–2019	The Walking Dead	Paul "Jesus" Rovia	Recurring (season 6); Main cast (seasons 7–9); 25 episodes
2016–2018	Talking Dead	Himself	7 episodes
2017	The Nightly Show	Himself	Episode: "With David Walliams - Night Four"
2018	Fear the Walking Dead	Paul "Jesus" Rovia	Guest Star, episode: "What's Your Story?" (season 4)
2019–2021	Prodigal Son	Malcolm Bright	Lead role (33 episodes)
2024	Law & Order: Organized Crime	Julian Emery	5 episodes
2026	The Faithful: Women of the Bible	Jacob	3 episodes
