= Colin Gilbert =

Scottish television producer

Colin Gilbert, born 1954, is a Glasgow-born television producer and former senior creative director of The Comedy Unit.

== Career ==
Gilbert began his career in comedy writing jokes for the radio shows Week Ending and The News Huddlines. He joined BBC Scotland as an Assistant Floor Manager in 1975 and continued writing comedy in his spare time. He was then asked to script edit the Rikki Fulton sketch show Scotch and Wry. This led to a move to London to script edit Not the Nine O'Clock News. On his return to BBC Scotland in 1983 he set up the Comedy Unit where he began working as a producer and director. His credits during this period include A Kick Up the Eighties with Tracey Ullman, Miriam Margolyes Roger Sloman, Ron Bain and Robbie Coltrane, Naked Radio, Laugh??? I Nearly Paid My Licence Fee with Robbie Coltrane and John Sessions, Naked Video with Gregor Fisher, Jonathan Watson, Helen Lederer, John Sparkes, Andy Gray, Tony Roper and Elaine C Smith, I Lovett with Norman Lovett, Kevin Turvey the Man Behind the Green Door which he co-wrote with Rik Mayall, City Lights with Gerard Kelly and Rab C Nesbitt with Gregor Fisher, created and written by Ian Pattison. Gilbert also worked with Fisher on The Baldy Man and The Tales of Para Handy.

In 1996 he left BBC Scotland to co-found The Comedy Unit as an independent production company with April Chamberlain who was at that time the business manager of the BBC Unit. Credits during this period include Rab C Nesbitt, The Karen Dunbar Show, Chewin' the Fat with Ford Kiernan and Greg Hemphill and then Still Game.

In 2006 the Comedy Unit was sold to RDF Media Group and Gilbert's most recent credits have been Empty with Gregor Fisher and Billy Boyd, the revival of Rab C Nesbitt after a 10-year gap and exec producing on Gary: Tank Commander written by and starring Greg McHugh.

In November 2011 soon after producing and directing the 10th series of Rab C Nesbitt, Gilbert left the Comedy Unit after nearly 30 years as its senior creative. In 2013 he returned to direct "Hoodie" a one off Rab C special.

== Personal life ==
Colin Gilbert is the son of Jimmy Gilbert, a former BBC Head of Comedy whose production credits include The Frost Report, Last of the Summer Wine and Whatever Happened to the Likely Lads. As a commissioner he was responsible for Porridge, Fawlty Towers and The Good Life.

Colin is married to Joanna a former make-up artist and they have two children, Nicola and Alistair.

== Awards ==
On 24 October 1992, Gilbert received The Royal Television Society's Reith Award for outstanding contribution to television in Scotland.
