= Ron Bain =

Scottish actor (1945–2024)

- Born: 12 March 1945; Grangemouth, Scotland
- Died: 5 August 2024 (aged 79)
- Occupations: Television actor Television director Television producer Comedian; Stage actor

Ron Bain (12 March 1945 – 5 August 2024) was a Scottish television actor, director, producer, comedian, and stage actor who in the latter part of his career focused primarily on directing. He is known for his work with comedian Rikki Fulton, with whom he first worked while performing Molière's The Miser at the Royal Lyceum Theatre, Edinburgh, in 1971 and for his productions spotlighting Fulton's character 'the Reverend I. M. Jolly'.

== Life and career ==
Ron Bain was born in Grangemouth, Scotland on 12 March 1945 and later attended the Royal Scottish Academy of Music and Drama. In 1977 Bain appeared as the weasely villain 'Danny the Busker' in The XYY Man, but he is best known for his work in comedy, rounding up sketches in Naked Video with stars such as Gregor Fisher, Elaine C Smith, Jonathan Watson, Helen Lederer, John Sparkes, Andy Gray, Tony Roper, Louise Beattie, and Kate Donnelly.

Bain also appeared in A Kick Up the Eighties, Laugh??? I Nearly Paid My Licence Fee, several episodes of Rab C Nesbitt, and live performances such as a 1988 benefit for the Scottish Ballet.

Bain died on 5 August 2024, aged 79.

== Filmography ==
As actor (Television)

- The View from Daniel Pike (1 episode, 1971)
- Adam Smith (4 episodes, 1972)
- Weir of Hermiston (1 episode, 1973)
- BBC Play of the Month (1 episode, 1975)
- ITV Playhouse (1 episode, 1977)
- The XYY Man (1 episode, 1977)
- The Standard (1 episode, 1978)
- Tycoon (1 episode, 1978)
- Kids (1 episode, 1979)
- Play for Today (1 episode, 1980)
- Juliet Bravo (1 episode, 1980)
- Strangers (1 episode, 1980)
- Boswell for the Defence (1981)
- A Kick Up the Eighties (1981)
- Laugh??? I Nearly Paid My Licence Fee (1984)
- Taggart (1 episode, 1985)
- Naked Video (1986–1987)
- The Tales of Para Handy (1 episode, 1994)
- Rab C. Nesbitt (3 episodes, 1991–1998)

As actor (film)

- Experience Preferred... But Not Essential (1982)

As director (TV)

- City Lights (1986)
- I, Lovett (1989)
- Rab C. Nesbitt (1990)
- Tis' the Season to be Jolly (1993)
- Jolly a Man for All Seasons (1994)
- Jolly: A Life (1995)
- Pulp Video (1995)
- The Tales of Para Handy (3 episodes, 1994–1995)
- Bad Boys (1 episode, 1996)
- It's a Jolly Life (1999)
- Rikki Fulton: The Time of his Life (1999)
- Brotherly Love (6 episodes, 2000)
- The Bill (4 episodes, 2001–2002)
- Snoddy (2002)
- Only an Excuse? (2003)
- The Karen Dunbar Show (2003)
- River City (1 episode, 2008)

As director (Video)

- Scotch & Wry 4: Rikki Fulton Prince of Pochlers (1992)
- Francie & Josie: The Farewell Performance (1996)
- The Best of Rikki Fulton: Rikki Fulton's Scotch & Wry Hogmanay 1996 (1997)
- Rikki Fulton's Rev. IM Jolly & Friends (2004)

== Recognition ==
In his review of Experience Preferred... But Not Essential, Tom Sabulis of the St. Petersburg Times wrote that Bain was a "warm, welcome presence". David Belcher of the Glasgow Herald offered that Rab C. Nesbitt was deftly directed by Bain.
