= Happiness is a cigar called Hamlet =

British advertising campaign

An example of the slogan as used in a 1984 newspaper advert

"Happiness is a cigar called Hamlet" was an advertising campaign for Hamlet Cigars, which ran on television from 1966 until all tobacco advertising on television was banned in the UK in 1991. The campaign returned in cinemas in 1996, continuing there until 1999, with the final commemorative advert and the modified tagline, "Happiness will always be a cigar called Hamlet."

== Origin and premise ==
The slogan itself had appeared in newspaper advertisements by early November 1965. The television advertising campaign was created by the Collett Dickenson Pearce agency in 1966. The premise is that a character finds themselves in an awkward or embarrassing situation before lighting and smoking a Hamlet cigar to console themselves, accompanied by an excerpt from a jazz rendition of Johann Sebastian Bach's Air on the G String, played by Jacques Loussier and his trio, which is still frequently associated with the brand.

The advertisements featured in television, radio and cinema commercials, various print media, and on billboards. One advert featured the 1982 Channel 4 blocks forming the number 5, then rewinding and then forming a jumbled mess, which then turned into a face with a cigar, making it smile. This advert was played from 1982 until 1989.

== Examples of advertisements ==
An advert from the series, produced in 1986 by Collett Dickenson Pearce, recreated a skit from the debut episode of BBC Scotland sketch show Naked Video which first aired just months earlier. The show's unkempt Baldy Man character (as played by Gregor Fisher) struggles to pose calmly in a photo booth, and after his height-adjustable seat drops him almost out of the frame, is heard to strike a match. As Fisher's face reenters the screen, he exhales smoke and smiles as a voiceover reads the slogan. The cigar, its packaging and even the brand's logo never appear on the screen.

Another ad showed Christopher Columbus aboard the Santa Maria being advised to turn around or the ship will fall off the edge of the world. He rebukes his advisors by saying "Nonsense! The world is round". Next moment the look-out on the crow's nest shouts "Captain! The edge of the World!". On hearing this Columbus takes out a cigar. As the "Happiness" line is being said, Columbus is seen smoking on deck as he and the ship both fall off the edge of the world.

One advertisement created a diversion by appearing to be advertising beer: a man, dying of thirst in a desert, finds a can of Heineken but accidentally spills it all into the sand; so instead he lights up a Hamlet cigar.

Not all of the advertisements in the series featured humans; one advert showed a production line where robots were being manufactured, but due to an error, one of the robots has its head placed back-to-front. On realising this, the said robot opens his chest to reveal a Hamlet pack and begins smoking, and the "Happiness" line is delivered in a metallic-sounding voice. Another 1980s advert depicted a dalek being unable to climb a flight of stairs, before producing a pack of Hamlet cigars from within its casing and using a claw-like arm to smoke it through the head casing, delivering the line "Hamlet, the mild cigar" in the dalek's distinctive voice.

=== Celebrity appearances ===
Numerous celebrities appeared in the adverts, including Ian Botham, Ronnie Corbett, and Gregor Fisher in the guise of his "Baldy Man" character (from Naked Video), attempting to use a photo booth and later attempting to get a family portrait.

The actor and comedian Russ Abbot spent years advertising Hamlet cigars.

== Ban on tobacco advertising ==
Since the UK banned all tobacco advertising on television, cinema and radio in the 1990s, as did much of Europe during that decade, the adverts are no longer aired. The final cinema adverts were initially shown from 1999 with the special slogan "Happiness will always be a cigar called Hamlet," although they reverted to the original tagline for a period after the UK tobacco industry refused to cease advertising voluntarily. It was eventually forced to do so by the Tobacco Advertising and Promotion Act 2002.

== Recognition ==
The advert was listed as the eighth greatest television advertisement of all time by Channel 4 in 2000. Both the original Channel 4 ident and the Hamlet advert spoofing the ident were made by Martin Lambie-Nairn. Furthermore, the advert was ranked as the ninth greatest advertisement in an ITV list made in 2005 and as the third-funniest television advertisement ever by Campaign Live in 2008.

== See also ==
- "Us Tareyton smokers would rather fight than switch!"
- "Winston tastes good like a cigarette should"
- "You're never alone with a Strand"
- Legacy Tobacco Documents Library Multimedia Collection
