= The Slab Boys Trilogy =

Play written by John Byrne

- The cover of The Slab Boys Trilogy, the artwork also by John Byrne
- The Slab Boys; Cuttin' a Rug; Still Life
- Author: John Byrne
- Country: United Kingdom
- Language: English
- Genre: Comedy and drama
- Publisher: Penguin Books
- Published: 1978, 1979, 1982, and 2008
- Media type: Play, film, print

The Slab Boys Trilogy is a set of three plays by the Scottish playwright John Byrne. The trilogy was originally known as Paisley Patterns. The three plays which make up the trilogy are: The Slab Boys, Cuttin' a Rug, and Still Life. The trilogy tells the story of a group of young, urban, working-class Scots during the period 1957–1972. The Slab Boys Trilogy was revived in 2003 by the Traverse Theatre in Edinburgh starring Paul Thomas Hickey and Iain Robertson in the lead roles. This is the first time that the Traverse Theatre have ever done a revival and it was received to great critical success. In April 2008, the Traverse Theatre premièred Nova Scotia, the fourth part of The Slab Boys story which follows the characters of Phil, Spanky and Lucille into the 21st century.

== The Slab Boys ==
In The Slab Boys, all the action takes place in the morning and afternoon of a Friday in 1957. The scene is the Slab Room of Carpet Manufacturers A.F. Stobo & Co. of Paisley, near Glasgow, Scotland. The company was based on Stoddard's carpet factory in Elderslie near Paisley, where John Byrne worked both as a slab boy and later as a designer following graduation from art school. The slab room is a small, paint-spattered dungeon where the apprentice designers, Phil, Spanky, and Hector, mix and grind colours for the design department. Coping with this boring task requires them to have a strong sense of humour.

The Slab Boys was premiered at the Traverse Theatre on 6 April 1978. Directed by David Hayman, and designed by Grant Hicks, the cast included, as Hector, Patrick Doyle, now better known as a Scottish film composer and Robbie Coltrane as Jack Hogg. It was first performed as a Broadway production starring Kevin Bacon, Sean Penn, Val Kilmer and Jackie Earle Haley, produced by Laura Shapiro Kramer and Roberta Weissman, and directed by Robert Alan Ackerman, at the Playhouse Theatre in New York City in 1983. The production received an Outer Critics Circle Award. The Slab Boys was released as a film in 1997, directed by the author. It starred Anna Massey, Tom Watson and Julie Wilson Nimmo. It cost £2.5 million.

=== Synopsis ===
The Slab Boys is set in the Slab Room of A. F. Stobo & Co. Carpet Manufacturers. This story focuses on a handful of young people who have to grow up fast in the tough working-class culture of 1950s industrial Scotland. It is a semi-autobiographical work. The play is set in 1957, the year Byrne worked in Stoddard's carpet factory as a slab boy, and the year he applied to Glasgow Art School. In 1958 he was accepted to the Art School, unlike the character Phil McCann, whose application is refused. He described the factory as a ‘technicolour hell hole’. Byrne was raised in Ferguslie Park, Paisley not far from the carpet factory.

The opening scene introduces the three incumbent slab boys bantering away on a Friday morning. Phil and Spanky are the Butch Cassidy and the Sundance Kid of the slab room and Hector is the target and source of most of their humour. Enter, Mr. Curry, the boss, who is always trying to shame Phil and Spanky into doing some actual work. Unfortunately, Phil and Spanky are far too clever to fall for that old ruse. In comes Jack Hogg. He used to be a slab boy, but has come up in the world and is now a designer. This is not as grand as it sounds – he is only one step further up the ladder and Phil and Spanky never let him forget it. Jack brings with him Alan Downie – an obviously better-off youngster whose father knows the boss, and who is going to work in the company for a while before going off to University. This does not endear him to Phil or Spanky.

Once some of the early hilarity subsides, we learn that Phil's mother has been yet-again incarcerated in a ward for the mentally unstable. We also find out the real reason for Phil being late this morning: he was presenting his portfolio at the Glasgow School of Art. He is now waiting on a phone call that will tell him how he got on.

Eventually, Sadie, the world-weary tea-lady, wanders in. She is wise to Phil and Spanky, but is charmed by Alan's superior manners. Sadie is also selling tickets for the Staff Dance that takes place that night. To everyone's amazement Hector buys two, and reveals that his mystery date is Lucille – a beautiful young woman who clearly has herself set on someone better looking, and probably more importantly, richer, than Hector.

Finally, in strolls Lucille. Phil and Spanky badger her for details about Hector's courtship and it transpires that it is only in Hector's fantasy-world that she is going with him. The two turn on Hector but end up feeling rather sorry for him and resolve to help him win the fair dame. How they do this is by crudely tailoring his already crudely tailored clothing and attempting to give him a haircut, but succeed only in injuring his scalp with the scissors.

After the lunch-break (which provides the interval in the play), the Slab Boys re-assemble. Lucille appears and Phil starts to broach the subject of Hector – he's going to ask Lucille out on Hector's behalf. Before he can reach the punch line, Hector's bloodied face appears at the window and terrifies her. They are hiding him while his clothes are being "altered". There thus ensues some typical farce as Hector is hidden during various walk-ons by Jack, Lucille and Mr. Curry.

Sadie re-appears for the afternoon tea-break and bemoans her useless husband. It appears that, following a recent mastectomy, he even threw out her prosthetic breast, believing it to be a burst football. She advises Lucille to avoid men and the trouble they cause.

At last Phil gets round to asking Lucille about the Staffie. Thinking he is asking on his own behalf, she agrees to go with him. Phil points out he was actually asking on the behalf of Hector. Lucille bluntly refuses.

The wages come round while Phil is out and Spanky is perturbed to find that Phil's and Hector's are missing – they will come round later having been specially made up. This suggests that they are going to be sacked. This is indeed the case for Phil, but then Hector comes in looking rather shocked and Phil and Spanky assume he has also been sacked. However, to their surprise, he is actually getting promoted to the design room.

Alan then enters and delivers Phil another piece of bad news. He has just taken a phone call for Phil, and curtly tells him that he did not get into the Art School. While he is digesting this a note arrives that his mother, who had briefly escaped from the asylum, is back in custody. Finally, Curry appears, telling Phil and Spanky that they'll need to stay behind to work for a rush-job. Phil blows off at him over the sacking, assuming that he had some part in it but Curry retorts that he actually stood up for Phil.

Spanky knuckles under and gets back to grinding the paste as Phil, despite all that has happened, exits optimistic and undefeated.

=== Dramatis personae ===
Phil McCann: A Slab Boy. Nineteen. Working class, from Ferguslie Park.

George 'Spanky' Farrell: A Slab Boy. Nineteen. From the same background as Phil.

Hector McKenzie: A Slab Boy. Nineteen, but small for his age.

Jack Hogg: A Designer. Early twenties. Very bad skin and hand-crafted lumber jackets.

Lucille Bentley: A Sketcher. Every Slab Boy's Dream. Very attractive.

Alan Downie: A new boy.

Willie Curry: The Gaffer. Scourge of the Slab Room. Mid-fifties.

Sadie: The tea lady. Middle-aged. Bad feet.

== Cuttin' a Rug ==
The original version of Cuttin' a Rug, The Loveliest Night of the Year, was first performed at the Traverse Theatre Club, Edinburgh, on 19 May 1979. John Breck played Phil, and Robbie Coltrane played Spanky. Cuttin' a Rug was broadcast on BBC Radio 4 as The Staffie. A rewritten version, Threads, was first performed at the Hampstead Theatre on 13 March 1980.

=== Synopsis ===
Cuttin' a Rug is set in Paisley Town Hall, on a Friday evening in 1957. Act One takes place in the ladies' and gents' cloakrooms; Act Two on the terrace overlooking the town. It is The Annual Staff Dance of A. F. Stobo & Co., Carpet Manufactures. During the first act, everyone arrives at the Hall, Lucille and Alan arriving together in his father's top-of-the-range car. Phil and Spanky spent the act drinking, lamenting Phil's job loss. Sadie complains to Miss Walkinshaw about Mr Curry stopping her on the way to the dance, and offering her a job as his cleaner. This highlights the theme of social inequality in the trilogy.

The focus of Act Two is the scene where Hector stabs himself. Hector has had enough of being the butt of all Spanky and Phil's jokes, and is waving a knife around. The lights go out, and there are the sounds of a struggle. When the lights come back on, Hector has the knife in him, and he is taken away to hospital. The play ends, however, on a positive, as Spanky says: "I'm nineteen with a wardrobe full of clothes... I've got everything to live for!"

=== Dramatis personae ===
Phil McCann: An ex-Slab Boy. Nineteen. Dapper dresser, non-dancer. Just been sacked that afternoon and been turned down for art school.

George 'Spanky' Farrell: Another Slab Boy. Nineteen. Phil's pal.

Hector McKenzie: Nineteen. A 'weed'. Newly promoted from the Slab Room to a Designer's desk. Wearing his Uncle Bertie's dinner suit.

Terry Skinnedar: Early twenties. A 'hard case'. Snappy dresser and ersatz Elvis. Bernadette's beau.

Alan Downie: University student temporarily in the Slab Room. Dressed in his father's dinner suit, which is somewhat over large for him.

Lucille Bentley: A Sketcher and good-looking doll. Nineteen.

Bernadette Rooney: Best chum to Lucille. Working as a 'Temp' in Dispatch. A stunner.

Miss Walkinshaw: A maiden lady of indeterminate years. At the Dance on her own.

Sadie: Stobo's tea lady. Also there solo. Has it in for Miss Walkinshaw this evening for some reason. Bad feet.

Willie Curry: Design Room Gaffer. Ex-army, mid-fifties.

== Still Life ==
Still Life was first performed at the Traverse Theatre Club, Edinburgh, on 27 May 1982. Billy McColl played Phil, Gerard Kelly played Spanky, Elaine Collins played Lucille, Andy Gray played Jack Hogg, David Hayman was the director, and John Byrne was the designer.

=== Synopsis ===
Act One of Still Life is set on the morning of a winter's day in 1967. Act Two is set in a winter's afternoon five years later. In Act One, Hector has just been buried, and Spanky – now a rockstar – and Phil are reminiscing about their time in the Slab Room. Lucille is married to Spanky, and they have one child. In Act Two, Phil's mother has just been buried. Lucille is now married to Phil.

=== Dramatis personae ===
Phil McCann: Thirty. An artist. Formerly a Slab Boy with A. F. Stobo & Co., Carpet Manufacturers.

George 'Spanky' Farrell: Twenty-nine. Lead singer and rhythm guitar with the Sparkling Casuals. Like McCann, a former Slab Boy.

Lucille (née Bentley): Twenty-nine. Attractive. Fashionably dressed.

Jack Hogg: Thirty-two. Runs his own gents' outfitters in Paisley.

Workman: Elderly. Does things at his own pace.
