= City Lights (1984 TV series) =

Scottish television sitcom made by BBC Scotland and set in Glasgow

- Genre: Comedy
- Written by: Bob Black
- Directed by: Ron Bain; Colin Gilbert
- Starring: Dave Anderson; Andy Gray; Gerard Kelly; Iain McColl
- Country of origin: United Kingdom
- Original language: English
- No. of series: 6
- No. of episodes: 41

Production
- Running time: 30 minutes

Original release
- Network: BBC1
- Release: 21 December 1984 – 31 December 1991

City Lights is a Scottish television sitcom made by BBC Scotland and set in Glasgow. After being pilotted on 21 December 1984, it ran for six series and four specials from 1984 to 1991 (networked 1987 to 1991) and was written by Bob Black. It also spawned two successful stage shows featuring the original cast, which toured Scotland.

== Premise ==
It starred Gerard Kelly as Willie Melvin, a bank-teller at the fictional Strathclyde Savings Bank (whose logo was very similar to the TSB), with dreams of becoming a novelist. Most of the plots revolved around his attempts to get his book, the autobiographical My Childhood Up A Close, published, however his efforts are continually thwarted by both his own incompetence and overall gullibility. He frequently gets led astray by best friend Chancer (Andy Gray), who has a penchant for get-rich-quick schemes and various dodgy dealings that backfire, with Willie getting caught up in the resulting mess. None of this ingratiates Willie with his long suffering boss and bank manager Adam McLelland (who is always looking for an excuse to fire him), and constantly exasperates his mother, played by Jan Wilson.

== Cast and characters ==
He was held back in this by his own incompetence, the dodgy dealings of his best friend Chancer (Andy Gray), and the lack of support he gained from his mother (Jan Wilson), the bank's manager Adam McLelland (Dave Anderson) and his obsequious fellow teller, Brian (Jonathan Watson). Other recurring characters included Chancer's friend Tam (Iain McColl), Willie's classmate from a creative writing class Irene (Elaine C. Smith) and his love interests, Janice (Elaine Collins, Series 1 and 2) and Fiona (Ann Bryson, Series 4 and 5).

Billy Connolly guest starred in the episode "It's a Wonderful Life, Too", a spoof of the film It's a Wonderful Life (1946), where he played a Glasweigan angel called 'The Dosser'.

== Series overview ==
Series	Episodes	Originally released	
Series	Episodes	First released	Last released
Pilot		21 December 1984	
1	6	14 October 1986	18 November 1986
2	6	27 October 1987	1 December 1987
3	6	24 October 1988	28 November 1988
New Year Special		31 December 1988	
4	6	13 November 1989	18 December 1989
New Year Special		31 December 1989	
5	6	29 October 1990	3 December 1990
Special		2 January 1991	
6	6	11 November 1991	16 December 1991
New Year Special		31 December 1991	

== Episodes ==
=== Pilot (1984) ===
No. overall	No. in series	Title	Original release date
1	1	"Pilot"	21 December 1984

=== Series 1 (1986) ===
No. overall	No. in series	Title	Original release date
2	1	"Talent"	14 October 1986
3	2	"Deep Freeze"	21 October 1986
4	3	"Magazine"	28 October 1986
5	4	"Lost Weekend"	4 November 1986
6	5	"A Room with a View"	11 November 1986
7	6	"True Life Adventures"	18 November 1986

=== Series 2 (1987) ===
No. overall	No. in series	Title	Original release date
8	1	"The More Things Change"	27 October 1987
9	2	"Moonlighting"	3 November 1987
10	3	"Local Hero"	10 November 1987
11	4	"Crimewatch OK"	17 November 1987
12	5	"True Love"	24 November 1987
13	6	"Fame"	1 December 1987

=== Series 3 (1988) ===
No. overall	No. in series	Title	Original release date
14	1	"The Longest Day"	24 October 1988
15	2	"All in the Mind"	31 October 1988
16	3	"I'm Willie, Fly Me"	7 November 1988
17	4	"The Melvin Diaries"	14 November 1988
18	5	"Catch 23"	21 November 1988
19	6	"The Siege"	28 November 1988

=== New Year Special (1988) ===
No. overall	No. in series	Title	Original release date
20	1	"It's a Wonderful Life, Too"	31 December 1988

=== Series 4 (1989) ===
No. overall	No. in series	Title	Original release date
21	1	"Thirty Nothing"	13 November 1989
22	2	"Play It Again, Willie"	20 November 1989
23	3	"The Go Between"	27 November 1989
24	4	"Romantic Fiction"	4 December 1989
25	5	"In Sickness and in Health"	11 December 1989
26	6	"The Law of the Jungle"	18 December 1989

=== New Year Special (1989) ===
No. overall	No. in series	Title	Original release date
27	1	"The Shape of Things to Come"	31 December 1989

=== Series 5 (1990) ===
No. overall	No. in series	Title	Original release date
28	1	"The New Leaf (Part 1)"	29 October 1990
29	2	"The New Leaf (Part 2)"	5 November 1990
30	3	"Scandal"	12 November 1990
31	4	"The Winslow Woman"	18 November 1990
32	5	"Old Friends"	25 November 1990
33	6	"The Front!"	3 December 1990

=== Special (1991) ===
No. overall	No. in series	Title	Original release date
34	1	"Murder He Wrote"	2 January 1991

=== Series 6 (1991) ===
No. overall	No. in series	Title	Original release date
35	1	"Trains, Boats & Planes"	11 November 1991
36	2	"The Mission"	18 November 1991
37	3	"Unhealthy Competition"	25 November 1991
38	4	"Parenthood"	2 December 1991
39	5	"Give Me a Ring Sometime"	9 December 1991
40	6	"Till Death Us Do Part"	16 December 1991

=== New Year Special (1991) ===
No. overall	No. in series	Title	Original release date
41	1	"The Haunting of Willie Melvin"	31 December 1991
