= Naked Video =

Scottish TV sketch show (1986–1991)

- Opening title
- Genre: Sketch show
- Created by: Colin Gilbert
- Directed by: Colin Gilbert; Brian Jobson; Alex Young
- Starring: Ron Bain; Gregor Fisher; Andy Gray; Helen Lederer; Tony Roper; Elaine C. Smith; John Sparkes; Jonathan Watson
- Composers: David Anderson; Tim Green; David McNiven
- Country of origin: United Kingdom
- No. of series: 5
- No. of episodes: 30

Production
- Producers: Colin Gilbert; Philip Differ
- Running time: 25 minutes
- Production company: BBC Scotland

Original release
- Network: BBC2
- Release: 12 May 1986 – 18 November 1991

Related
- A Kick Up the Eighties; Laugh??? I Nearly Paid My Licence Fee; Only an Excuse?; Rab C. Nesbitt; The Baldy Man

Naked Video is a BBC Scotland sketch show that was aired on BBC2 from 26 May 1986 to 18 November 1991. The show was created by Colin Gilbert who had previously created A Kick Up the Eighties and Naked Radio (the latter being a radio sketch show that was aired on BBC Radio Scotland, began its ten-year run on 22 January 1981, covered all aspects of Scottish society and featured a lot of topical satire material rather than parody). The series originally starred Ron Bain, Gregor Fisher, Andy Gray, Elaine C. Smith, Tony Roper, Helen Lederer and Jonathan Watson, but they were later joined by Kate Donnelly and Louise Beattie. The series' producer was Colin Gilbert and its script editor was Philip Differ.

Naked Radio proved a popular part of the local schedule, and in 1985, the cast mounted the series on stage at the year's Edinburgh Festival Fringe. Gilbert realised the series had potential for television and Naked Video was created. It proved popular at a time when alternative comedy was at its peak. The Naked Radio series ended in 1991, when it was cancelled along with Naked Video. The show also spawned a radio spin-off: the football-themed Only an Excuse?, which later also made the transition to television.

In 2000, the cast reunited for a theatre show and radio broadcast, and in 2005, Gerard Kelly presented a documentary for the Radio Roots season on BBC Radio Scotland, looking at how the series "sprouted a generation of TV writing and performing talent".

== Regular characters ==
Naked Video featured many characters (most of which were one-offs) but some of the recurring ones were:

- Rab C. Nesbitt (Gregor Fisher, Series 1–4): A stereotypical Glaswegian alcoholic, dressed in a string vest, a pinstripe suit and a grubby headband covering a shrapnel wound. He was arguably the most popular character (his wife Mary Nesbitt, played by Elaine C. Smith, and his neighbour "Jamesy" Cotter, played by Tony Roper, also first appeared in this series) and he later went on to receive his own series in 1988 (which was produced and directed by Colin Gilbert, and written by Ian Pattison) which became a successful sitcom (however, his sons, Gash and Burney Nesbitt, did not appear in Series 4).
- The Baldy Man (Gregor Fisher): A vain halfwit who has only a few strands of hair across his head. The character later went on to receive his own series on ITV in 1995, produced and directed by Colin Gilbert, who also worked with Fisher on Rab C. Nesbitt.
- Drunk Sloane (Helen Lederer): An attractive, but stupid, woman who props up a wine bar and delivers monologues to the camera.
- Bitter Divorcee Lizzie (Elaine C. Smith): An attractive thirty-something woman who, like Drunk Sloane, delivers monologues to the camera about her divorce from her husband (whom she had given the nickname "Fast Eddy"), only from her bedroom as opposed to a wine bar.
- Highlander Angus (Gregor Fisher, Series 3–5): A Gaelic television presenter for the "Outer Hebrides Broadcasting Corporation" who made up news headlines for clips of real-world footage (in one episode, he also held a phone-in competition to win an OHBC vest). He replaced the two presenters (played by Andy Gray and Helen Lederer) who introduced each episode of Series 1 and 2.
- Bernard and Miriam (Gregor Fisher and Helen Lederer, Series 3–5): A repressed middle-aged couple. In one episode, Bernard made an electric chair for Miriam's mother, and when Miriam took offence, she put Bernard into it and electrified him (but it did not kill him).
- Siadwell (John Sparkes): A naive young Welsh poet delivering monologues from his bedroom. At the end of the third series, he was killed off, after willingly drinking himself to death.

== Episodes ==
A total of thirty 25-minute episodes were produced over five six-episode series. The third series was also produced in 1988 prior to the pilot episode of Rab C. Nesbitt (as evidenced by a VHS tape named "Mary and Jim's Wedding, 2nd November 1988" which dropped out of a Polaroid camera and had an "18" sticker placed on it at the end of its third episode), but it was not transmitted until 19 January 1989.

Series overview
Season	Episodes	Originally released	
Season	Episodes	First released	Last released
1	6	May 12, 1986	June 16, 1986
2	6	April 16, 1987	May 21, 1987
3	6	January 19, 1989	February 23, 1989
4	6	September 29, 1989	November 3, 1989
5	6	October 14, 1991	November 18, 1991

On 17 July 2006, Series 1 was released on DVD by BBC Worldwide and 2Entertain, followed by Series 2 on 9 October of the same year, and Series 3 on 29 January 2007. As of 2026, Series 4 and 5 have not been released.
