= Offside (TV series) =

Scottish TV comedy football series (1998–2007)

Offside is a Scottish comedy football television show aired on BBC One Scotland and was presented by Scottish Football journalist Tam Cowan. It ran from 1998 to 2007.

== History ==
The programme began in 1998 and was produced by The Comedy Unit. The programme was axed in 2007, for unknown reasons.

Only an Excuse? star Jonathan Watson also contributed to the show, previously producing the Only a Wee Excuse section of the show which was replaced by the "Week that Wisnae" sketch for the last series, this was essentially a simplified version of its predecessor.

Every episode Catriona (Cat) Harvey would star with Tam Cowan and Jonathan Watson. Nearing the end of the last series the Real Radio (Scotland) star stopped appearing on the show for unknown reason.

== Guests ==
Offside began with only minor footballing guests, however in its later times more widely known celebrities appeared, such as Joyce Falconer, Kevin Keegan, George Galloway and Tommy Sheridan.

== Audience ==
The audience for Offside normally come dressed in replica football jerseys, and actively cheer or boo when references are made about their concerning teams. Tam himself is a Motherwell fan, and a significant number of the audience normally reflect this. Up until the 2006 Season, the show featured its mascot "Jock the Cock", a giant rooster, who would dance at the end of the show, at Cowan's request: "Take it away, Jock the Cock". Jock the Cock was played throughout by the infamous former fur filler of St. Mirren's Paisley Panda (a.k.a. Andy Duncan)

== Awards ==
In March 2002 Tam Cowan won a Royal Television Society Award for best regional presenter.
