= Hamlet (cigar) =

British brand of cigar

- Product type: Cigar
- Produced by: Japan Tobacco
- Introduced: 1964; 62 years ago

Hamlet is a brand of cigar produced by the Gallaher Group division of Japan Tobacco. First launched in the United Kingdom in 1964, they are now sold in a number of western European markets in both miniatures and regular length, and were frequently described as "the mild cigar" in their former advertising campaigns.

== Advertising ==
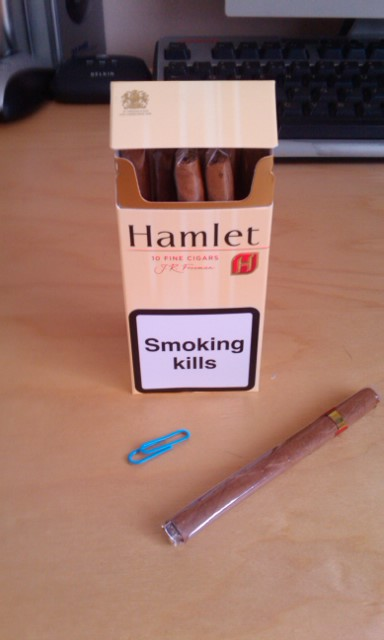
A pack of Hamlet cigars in 2011, before plain packaging laws

Hamlet cigars are most famous in the UK for their advertising campaign "Happiness is a cigar called Hamlet", which presented scenes in which a character, having failed dismally at something, is consoled by lighting a Hamlet cigar. The product being advertised was deliberately made unclear until the cigar itself appeared, accompanied by the tune of Bach's Air on the G String played by French musician Jacques Loussier, followed by the slogan "Happiness is a cigar called Hamlet". Classic examples included:

- Photo Booth - the most famous skit starring Gregor Fisher as The Baldy Man (a spin off character from the Scottish comedy show Naked Video). The man enters an automatic photo booth, and makes two unsuccessful attempts at taking a photo of himself, before the chair collapses on the third attempt.
- Motorcycle - a hapless passenger on a motorcycle sidecar, which breaks off at a fork in the road and is uncontrollably heading for a river.
- Bunker - a golfer (who is unseen) repeatedly tries to hit a ball out from being trapped in the bunker - before he eventually gives up and throws the ball out by hand.
- Car Wash - a driver enters a car wash, and starts the machine only for the window winder handle to break off in his hand, resulting in him being drenched by the passing brushes.
- Football - a nervous footballer protecting his groin prior to a free kick being taken decides to turn and face the goal instead. When the striker takes the kick, it bounces off the goalposts and hits him in the groin anyway.

=== Ban on tobacco advertising ===
Since the UK banned all tobacco advertising on television, cinema and radio in the 1990s, as did much of Europe during that decade, the adverts are no longer aired. The final cinema adverts were initially shown from 1999 with the special slogan "Happiness will always be a cigar called Hamlet," although they reverted to the original tagline for a period after the UK tobacco industry refused to cease advertising voluntarily. It was eventually forced to do so by the Tobacco Advertising and Promotion Act 2002.

== Factory closures ==
The closure of the century-old former J. R. Freeman's factory in Cardiff at which Hamlet's cigars were produced was announced in September 2007, and production transitioned to Gallaher's Ballymena factory by September 2009. The Cardiff factory was demolished the following year. By 2014 plans were afoot to move production again — this time to Łódź, Poland — with the Ballymena facility also to be shuttered by 2017.
