= Only an Excuse? =

Scottish comedy television show

- Genre: Sketch
- Created by: Philip Differ
- Starring: Jonathan Watson
- Country of origin: Scotland
- Original language: English/Scots
- No. of episodes: 34

Production
- Producer: Philip Differ
- Production location: Scotland
- Running time: 30 minutes

Original release
- Network: BBC One Scotland
- Release: 31 December 1993 – 31 December 2020

Related
- Scotch and Wry

Only an Excuse? is an annual Scottish comedy sketch show that was broadcast on BBC One Scotland on Hogmanay from 1993 to 2020.

It starred the actor and comedian Jonathan Watson and featured impressions of some of Scottish football's great characters such as Denis Law, Tommy Burns, Barry Ferguson, Sir Alex Ferguson, Frank McAvennie, Walter Smith, Graeme Souness and Chick Young as well as caricatures of the "stereotypical" Old Firm fan.

== History ==
Only an Excuse? was first broadcast as a one-off special on BBC Radio Scotland, prior to the 1987 Scottish Cup Final. It was a parody of the five-part BBC Scotland television documentary Only a Game?, which had aired in Scotland prior to the 1986 World Cup Finals and comprehensively documented the history of Scottish football. The documentary was narrated by Scottish novelist William McIlvanney, whose distinctive voice was expertly mimicked by Jonathan Watson for the radio spoof.

After further occasional radio specials including Only Another Excuse?, A Tale of Two Seasons and Only a World Cup Excuse, all of which were released on cassette by BBC Scotland, the show switched to television in 1993, retaining its original double act of Rangers fan Watson and Celtic fan Tony Roper. The first episode replaced Rikki Fulton's long-running annual comedy sketch show Scotch and Wry in the Hogmanay television schedules.

The show has also been performed at the theatre, with the most recent performance of Only An Excuse? taking place at the Glasgow Royal Concert Hall in September 2004. The scripts of the early theatre shows, written by Philip Differ, were published in the book Only an Excuse?: The Scripts by Mainstream Publishing in 1995.

In December 2020, it was confirmed that the 2020 episode would be an hour long programme and that Watson and Differ would not be making any further episodes.

== Spin-offs ==
Jonathan Watson appeared in a spin-off called Only a Wee Excuse on Tam Cowan's weekly Offside programme. Up until the last series, Watson's slot was a scaled-down version of the full show, but from the last series onward saw Watson appearing in the studio without costume to perform his impersonations (as in his theatre performances). Another noticeable difference is that Watson starts each segment in his own voice and sets the context and then ends again in his own voice saying, "And that Tam was the week that wisnae."

Watson appeared in a sketch in the BBC's Children in Need 2008 telethon as Alex Ferguson being interviewed by Adrian Chiles.

== Regular cast ==
- Jonathan Watson (1993–2020)
- Tony Roper (1993–1994)
- Ross Stenhouse (1993)
- Grant Smeaton (1993–1994, 1997, 1999–2010)
- Juliette Gilmour (1993–1994)
- Alistair McGowan (1995–1998)
- Greg Hemphill (1995–1996)
- Lewis MacLeod (1995)
- Gordon Kennedy (1995–1996)
- Susan Nisbet (1997–1998)
- Laurie Ventry (1998)
- Geoff Boyz (1999)
- Iain Davidson (1999–2000)
- June Brogan (1999)
- Fiona Henderson (1999)
- Paul Reid (2000–2001)
- Gabriel Quigley (2001)
- Tom Urie (2002–2005)
- Elaine M. Ellis (2003–2005)
- Marj Hogarth (2005)
- Matt Costello (2006–2010)
- Jordan Young (2006)
- Julie Austin (2006–2010, 2012–2013)
- Gerard Kelly (2006)
- Clare Waugh (2007, 2011, 2015)
- Paul-James Corrigan (2007, 2009–2010)
- Johnny Austin (2008)
- Heather Reid (2009)
- Adam Smith (2011)
- Scott Fletcher (2011)
- Gerry McLaughlin (2011–2014)
- Amanda Marment (2011–2014)
- Chris Forbes (2012, 2014, 2018)
- Robert Yates (2012)
- Josh York (2013)
- Sally Reid (2014, 2016)
- Charlene Boyd (2014)
- Ryan Fletcher (2015–2018)
- Louise McCarthy (2015–2019)
- James Young (2015)
- Moyo Akandé (2017)
- Fiona Wood (2018)
- Mark Cox (2019)
- Joy McAvoy (2019–2020)
- Alex Norton (2019)

== Guests ==
Figures from Scottish entertainment regularly appeared, as themselves. These included Hazel Irvine, Kelly Dalglish, Gordon Brewer, Catriona Shearer, Reevel Alderson, Jackie Bird, Cathy MacDonald, Chris Hoy, Kirsty Wark, Judy Murray, Muriel Gray, Michelle McManus and Judith Ralston.
