= Colin Gilbert (disambiguation) =

Colin Gilbert is a TV producer.

Colin Gilbert may also refer to:

- Colin Gilbert (chess player), winner of Welsh Chess Championship
- Colin Gilbert (swimmer) who represented Canada at the 2014 Summer Youth Olympics
