= The Baldy Man =

- Created by: Philip Differ
- Starring: Gregor Fisher; Andy Gray; Helen Lederer; Ford Kiernan
- Country of origin: Scotland
- Original language: English
- No. of series: 2
- No. of episodes: 13

Production
- Running time: 30 minutes per episode

Original release
- Network: ITV
- Release: 13 April 1995 – 24 December 1998

The Baldy Man is a television series starring Gregor Fisher, a Scottish comedian. It was broadcast in two series totalling thirteen episodes on ITV, screening in 1995 and 1998, and produced for Carlton Television by Working Title Films. Both series were also broadcast in full on Russian channel TB6 Moscow.

The character's chief attributes were his comb over hairstyle as well as his bumbling nature and plump figure. The series was produced and directed by Colin Gilbert who worked with Fisher in Scotland's well known situation comedy Rab C. Nesbitt among many others. It was written by Philip Differ who was the script editor on Naked Video. The character first appeared in a series of sketches in the BBC Scotland show Naked Video (1986–1991), as well as in a memorable TV commercial for Hamlet cigars.

== Guest stars ==
The series featured cameos by a number of well-known performers such as Helen Lederer, Joanna Kirkland, Lionel Blair, Ford Kiernan, Greg Hemphill, Iain Cuthbertson and John Grieve.

== Episode list ==
Series One:

1. New Look / Delegate – first broadcast: 13 April 1995
2. Keep Fit / Ill – first broadcast: 27 April 1995
3. D.I.Y. / Reunion – first broadcast: 16 August 1995
4. Tearoom / Pets – first broadcast: 25 August 1995
5. Bath / Referee – first broadcast: 30 August 1995
6. Hair / Crime – untransmitted in UK, but was shown in Russia

Series Two:

1. Mother's Day / Smell – first broadcast: 11 September 1997
2. Goldrush / God – first broadcast: 15 October 1997
3. Barbecue / China Doll – first broadcast: 22 October 1997
4. Chauffeur of the Bride / Back Window – first broadcast: 26 October 1997
5. Casualty / Babysitting – first broadcast: 25 November 1997
6. Jigsaw / Murder – first broadcast: 17 December 1997
7. Litter Avenger / Aliens – first broadcast: 24 December 1998

== DVD and VHS releases ==
The complete series has been released on DVD as a two-disc boxset in Germany from Pidax Entertainment. However, there as of yet have been no immediate plans so far to release the series onto DVD in Britain. The first two episodes were released on a video entitled Introducing...The Baldy Man on 9 October 1995. There were no further releases of the series, however, advertisements to promote a further two VHS releases for episodes 3-6 were featured on the tape.

== Endorsements ==
The character was also the star of a series of humorous television commercials for Hamlet cigars.
