= Rikki and Me =

Rikki and Me was a stage show celebrating the life of comic actor Rikki Fulton, it starred Gerard Kelly and Tony Roper as Jack Milroy and Rikki Fulton. The show was a huge success all over theatres in Scotland and is now available on DVD.
