= Ivan Shakespeare =

British comedy writer

Ivan Shakespeare (19 July 1952 in West Bromwich, Staffordshire – 3 February 2000 in London) was a British comedy writer. A commissioned writer on the BBC Radio 4 show Week Ending, Shakespeare was also commissioned to pen the radio comedy series, A Square of One's Own, and the BBC political satire show Bremner, Bird and Fortune.

He died at age 47 from a heart attack.
