= Tam Cowan =

British journalist

Thomas Cowan (born 21 April 1969) is a Scottish football journalist and radio presenter who was previously also a television presenter.

== Early life ==
He was educated at Braidhurst High School in Motherwell where he was one of the school captains.

== Career ==
Cowan presented Scottish football comedy TV show Offside. He has also taken to live stand-up comedy by taking "Offside" to the stage in 2002. The show was recorded live at the King's Theatre in Glasgow for DVD.

In February 2010, Cowan presented It's Never Too Late, a six-part documentary series for STV on literacy and numeracy difficulties among adults. Cowan was also a guest presenter for STV's overnight interactive strand The Nightshift and rejoined the station on 20 September 2011 as a main co-presenter for the lifestyle magazine show The Hour, alongside Michelle McManus. The programme was axed four weeks after a move to a weekly prime time slot and a revamp of the programme led to low ratings.

For 16 years, Cowan was a restaurant critic and reviewer, and additional columnist, with the Daily Record newspaper. He moved to their rival newspaper, The Scottish Sun, in March 2014.

Cowan presents the comedy football radio show Off the Ball on BBC Radio Scotland, along with Daily Record and Sunday National journalist and good friend Stuart Cosgrove. Cowan was temporarily dropped from Off the Ball in 2013 for sexist remarks made about women's football in his Daily Record column.

Former Hibernian player Marvin Bartley accused Cowan of bullying in December 2022 via social media. Cowan criticised Bartley after he had spoken out about alleged racist abuse of Jair Tavares during a match against Dundee United in October 2022. In the same social media post, Bartley insinuated that Cowan also had a problem with his partner, Sky Sports presenter, Eilidh Barbour. Cowan had been critical of Barbour after the presenter had voiced their disgust over sexist and racist comments made by a speaker at the Scottish Football Writers' Association awards in 2021.

== Personal life ==
Cowan is a well known fan of Motherwell F.C. He and his wife, Liz, have a daughter.

== Filmography ==
Television

Year	Title	Role	Notes
1998–2007	Offside	Presenter	For BBC Choice, 1998-2001; For BBC Scotland, 2002-2007
2010	It's Never Too Late	Presenter	6 Episodes
2011	The Hour	Presenter	4 Episodes

Radio

Year	Title	Role	Notes
1994–	Off the Ball	Presenter	
