= King's Theatre, Glasgow =

Theatre in Glasgow, Scotland

Coordinates: 55°51′53.8″N 4°16′7.4″W

King's Theatre
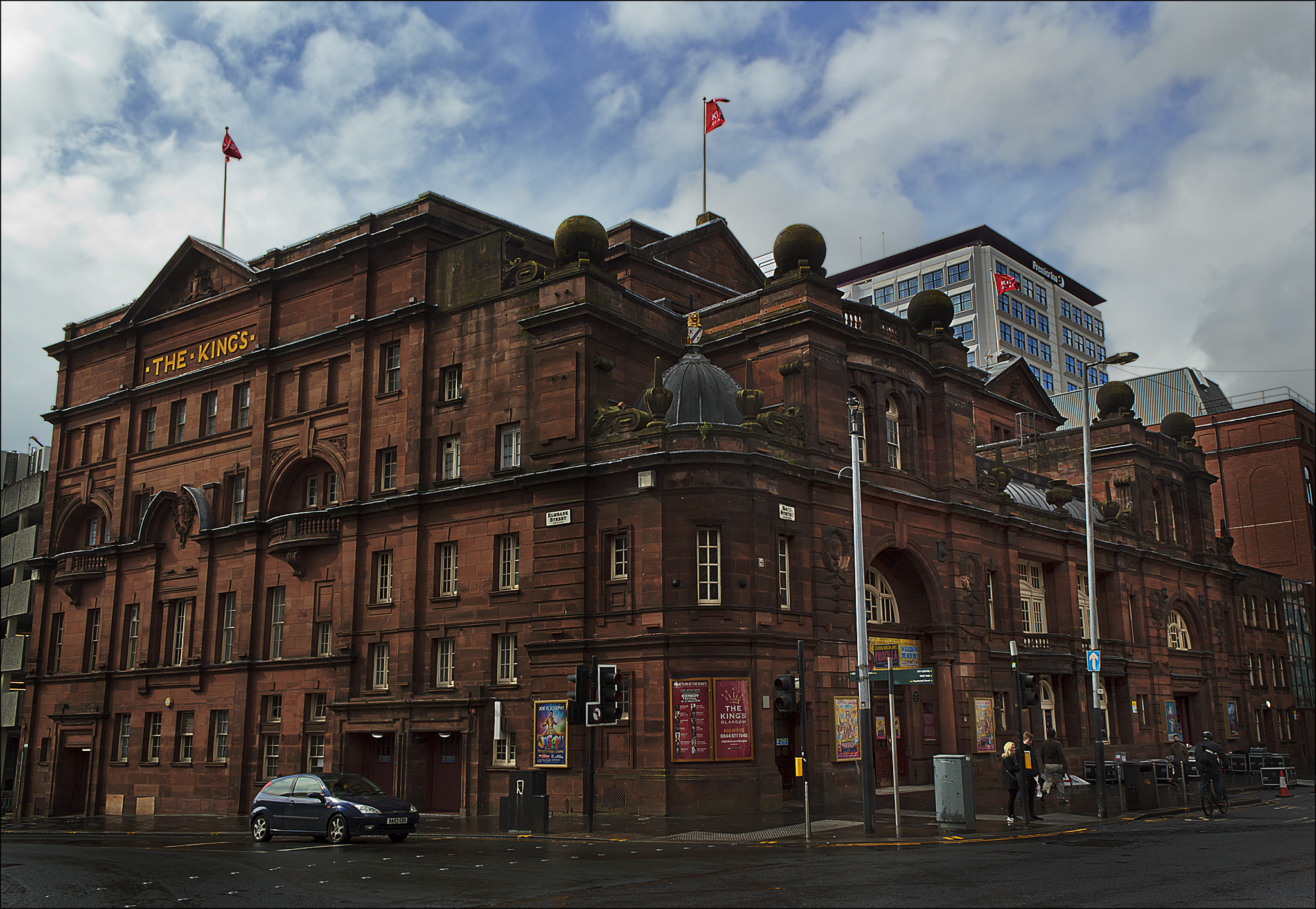
- King's Theatre in 2016
- Interactive map of King's Theatre
- Location: Glasgow, Scotland
- Owner: Howard & Wyndham Ltd (1904–1967); Glasgow City Council (1967–present)
- Capacity: 1,785 (4 levels)
- Type: Proscenium
- Designation: Category A listed

Construction
- Opened: 12 September 1904
- Years active: 1904–present
- Architect: Frank Matcham

Website
- Official Box Office

The King's Theatre is located in Glasgow, Scotland. It was built for Howard & Wyndham Ltd under its chairman Baillie Michael Simons as a sister theatre of their Theatre Royal in the city and was designed by Frank Matcham, opening in 1904. The theatre is primarily a receiving house for touring musicals, dance, comedy and circus-type performances. The theatre also provides a prominent stage for local amateur productions. The King's Theatre also stages an annual pantomime, produced by First Family Entertainment.

The theatre is currently operated by ATG Entertainment, under a lease from Glasgow City Council who own the building. It is widely regarded as "one of Scotland's most historic and significant theatres" and has become known for its high quality production abilities. Additionally, the theatre has won numerous accolades since its original opening. Described by Historic Environment Scotland as "an important example of an Edwardian theatre", it was categorised as a Category A listed building in December 1970.

== History ==
=== Opening and early history ===
The King's Theatre was commissioned by the theatre company Howard & Wyndham at a cost of over £50,000 and opened on 12 September 1904. In the 1930s like many city theatres, it had been policy to close during the summer while many city residents headed to the coast for their holidays, but this all changed in 1933 when the then managing director of Howard & Wyndham, A. Stewart Cruikshank, decided to experiment with a quality show, a cocktail of music, laughter and song, to outmatch the seaside-style summer shows. The show started at 8.30pm and was changed weekly, attracting huge crowds. The record run of 31 weeks under the top billing of Dave Willis remains unbroken in variety history. The first such show was on 5 June 1933, and was imaginatively titled the Half Past Eight Show.

This successful summer tradition continued, with changes becoming fortnightly to allow as many people to see it as possible. Howard and Wyndham Ltd acquired the larger Alhambra Theatre in Waterloo Street in 1954, in anticipation of selling their Theatre Royal in Hope Street to Roy Thomson as studios for the launch of the commercial television station STV, and the summer shows were transferred there.

The King's concentrated upon musical plays and drama and in time introduced ballet, Pavlova being greatly popular. Film seasons were introduced before 1914. Pantomime started in the 1960s only after the Alhambra Theatre closed. These lavish shows, originally funded in a joint venture by Glasgow Corporation and Edinburgh Corporation included Stanley Baxter and others. The Christmas pantomime continued as an annual feature, with comedians and actors such as Gerard Kelly and Elaine C. Smith. There is always a healthy rivalry with other Scottish theatres to put on the biggest and best Christmas pantomimes, with the main competition to the King's in Glasgow now being the Pavilion Theatre in Renfield Street.

=== Glasgow Corporation ownership ===
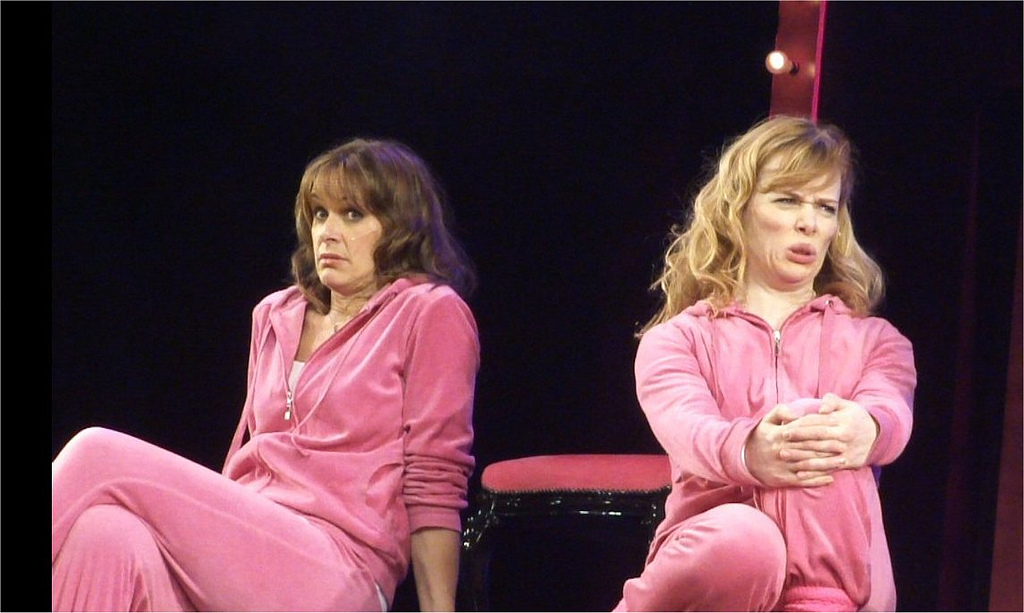
Carol Smillie in Hormonal Housewives at The King's Theatre, Glasgow, November 2011

Over the years many actors and actresses have graced the stage of The King's. These included Laurence Olivier, Sarah Bernhardt, Ray Walston, Katharine Hepburn and Tyrone Power. The Jackson Five and Dolly Parton appeared at a Royal Variety Performance in the late 1970s.

In 1967, Howard and Wyndham sold the King's Theatre to Glasgow Corporation in the face of competition from the civic theatre movement, which was attracting Arts Council money. This secured the theatre for the future, as television and colour films had led to the closure of the majority of them in Britain. Around the same period, the theatre gained an extension to the rear as part of the Charing Cross Complex which was built to the west of the building in the early 1970s. However, the King's has been most famous among locals for its annual pantomime - which has starred variety greats such as Stanley Baxter, Jimmy Logan and Rikki Fulton. In 1990 when the City of Glasgow became the first European City of Culture in Britain, the theatre was a main venue, and underwent a programme of major refurbishment.

=== Ambassador Theatre Group ===
The theatre continues to be owned by the city council, but in 2002 the theatre's day-to-day management was transferred to the Ambassador Theatre Group, becoming their first venue in Scotland, although they have since also taken over the management of the Theatre Royal at the opposite end of the city centre as well as the Edinburgh Playhouse. In 2004, the theatre celebrated its centenary, and a one-off documentary on the theatre was broadcast on BBC1 Scotland on 31 January 2003. The programme was presented by Elaine C Smith and featured interviews with Gerard Kelly, Stanley Baxter, Paul O'Grady, Tony Roper, Nicholas Parsons and Johnny Beattie, among others. In 2005, responsibility for production of the pantomime was transferred to the Ambassador Theatre Group subsidiary First Family Entertainment. Since 2017, the pantomime has been managed by Crossroads Pantomimes.

In early 2008, the King's Theatre announced that a full programme of interior refurbishment was planned, to restore the theatre to its full former glory, in time for the Commonwealth Games that the city is to host in 2014. Work for this restoration is expected to commence in the Summer of 2009. The firm chosen as Architects for the work are Simpson & Brown. The theatre had its Stalls & Grand Circle seating replaced during the autumn 2009, with an authentic style appropriate to the theatre. The stalls has improved legroom and no centre aisle, improving sightlines. The theatre is offering patrons the opportunity to sponsor a seat, with the price including a membership to the Friends scheme that the theatre operates. Other restoration work includes new carpet within the auditorium, new orchestra pit railing, and preparations for the installation of air conditioning.

== Overview ==
=== Location ===
The theatre occupies the corner of Bath Street and Elmbank Street, in the Charing Cross area of the city. The longer Bath Street elevation houses both the main entrance, the scenery dock and stage door. The equally decorative but shorter Elmbank Street elevation has various fire exits and the entrance to the Gallery.

=== The building ===
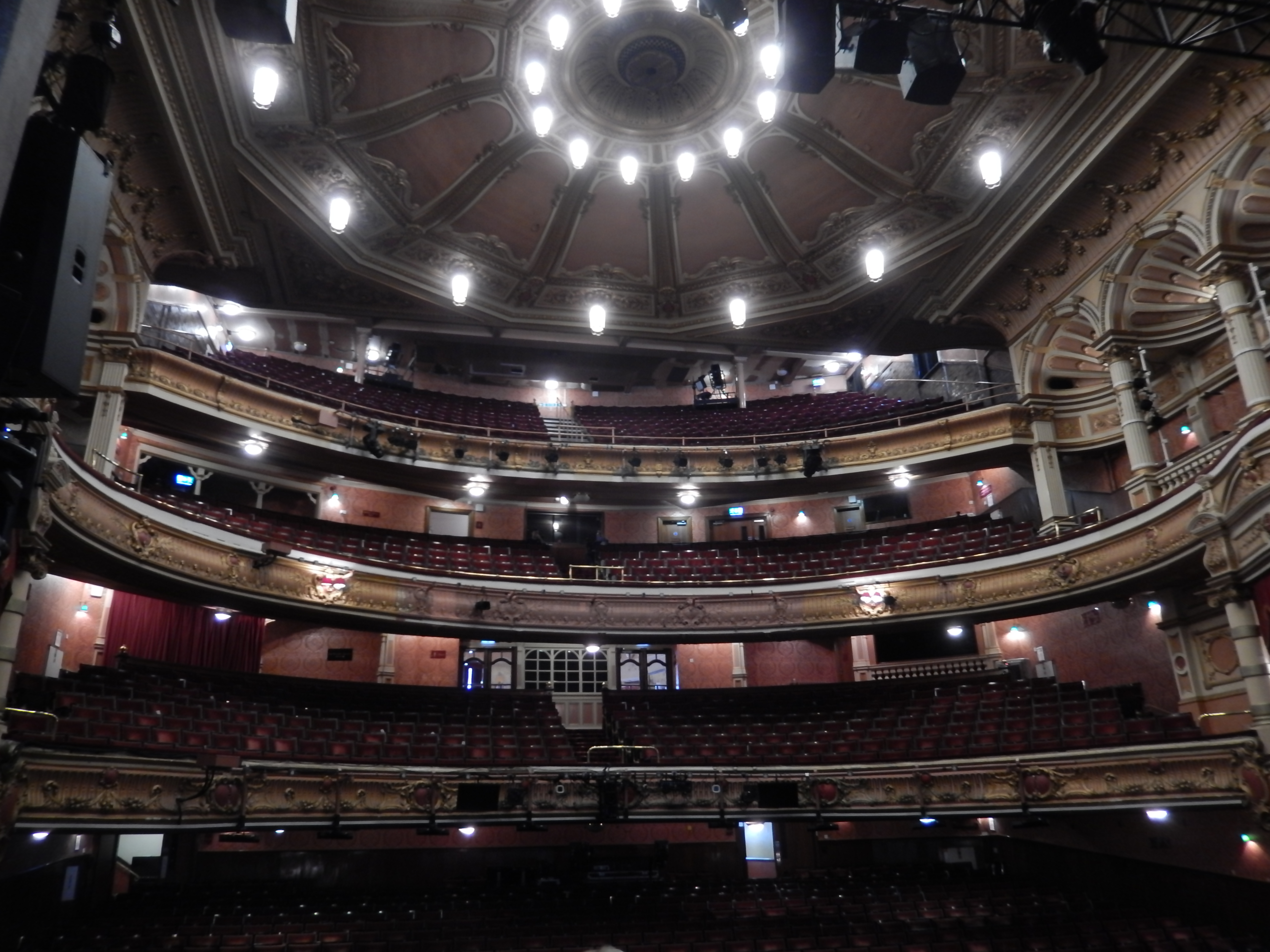
View from the Stage

Frank Matcham made effective use of the prominent corner site in designing the two facades of the building. Originally, an iron canopy, made by the Saracen Foundry in Possilpark, Glasgow, wrapped around the front of the building, although this appears to have been removed by the Second World War, possibly for munitions production. The facade on Bath Street is a mix of styles, with influences of Baroque and Art Nouveau in red Dumfriesshire sandstone. A pair of two storey pavilions stand near either end of the Bath Street elevation, one providing access to the main foyer whilst the other houses the scenery dock, and opens straight onto the stage. The pavilions are topped with ball finials. Originally a female statue stood on top of either pavilion, but these were removed during the war period, to prevent them becoming damaged, however were subsequently misplaced, and have never been rediscovered.

The theatre provides seating on four levels - Stalls, Grand Circle, Upper Circle and Gallery. Matcham was famous for his innovative style of cantilever construction of the individual seating tiers, which virtually eliminated the need for supporting pillars, and the King's was no exception, with reasonable sightlines from most seats. Victorian and Edwardian theatres were almost always built to segregate patrons at each level, although subsequent modernisations often eradicate this. This has thus far not been the case in the King's, which still has separate entrances, some of which have traces of former pay boxes, now disused. The standard of seating and decoration is also less luxurious as you get further up the house. The Stalls and Grand Circle are accessed via the small main foyer, which still impresses with its barrel vaulted ceiling, horizontal bands of red and white marble, and decorative plasterwork on the ceilings, including caryatids. The Upper Circle is accessed via a door to a stairwell to the left of the main Bath Street entrance. The Gallery is accessed via a staircase at the back of the building with its own entrance on Elmbank Street.

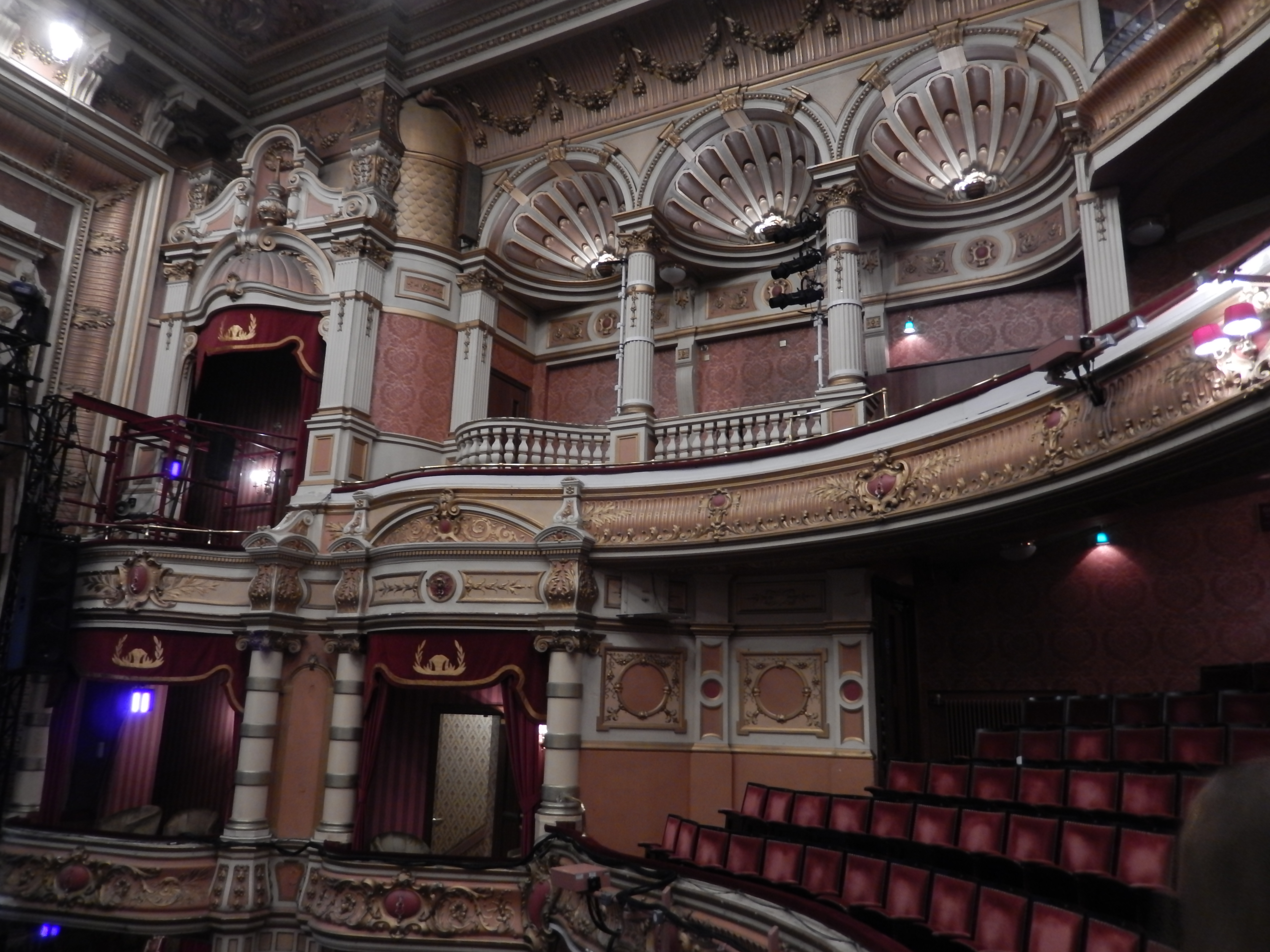
Boxes seen from the Grand Circle

The auditorium seats 1,785. The ceiling panelling fans out from a single centre ceiling rose - each panel originally contained painted scenes, although they are currently plain. The proscenium is surrounded by heavy marble and plasterwork borders. Above the proscenium an elegant design with cherubs flanking a crown and a K/T emblem provides a focal point to the theatre when the curtain is down. The red curtain has simple gilding, but often remains unseen as it is unused for many of today's productions. The seats and drapes are of a rich red material. The safety curtain features a painted design of drapes, and framed in the centre is a projection screen. At Grand Circle level two boxes on either side of the auditorium continue where the grand circle balcony finishes. A further box (now disused) is located at Upper Circle level above this, with an elaborate domed canopy. Three domed alcoves sit along either side of the upper circle. Comedian and actor Billy Connolly famously described it as "like performing inside a wedding cake".

Subsequent alterations to the theatre includes the unfortunate removal of a modern canopy, which ran along most of the Bath Street elevation. This dated from around the 1950s, and was removed in 2004 during a programme of external works, which also included some stone-cleaning and refurbishment. To complement the newly revealed exterior architecture, the facades were floodlit with coloured lights. In 1986, an extension to the western side of the Bath Street elevation provided new dressing room and office accommodation, as well as a new wardrobe room and stage door.

== Annual pantomime production ==
The pantomime at the King's Theatre has been running annually since 1971. Before that a few pantomimes were staged from 1964/65 after Glasgow Corporation bought the theatre from Howard & Wyndham Ltd. From the 1970s pantomime productions at the theatre were funded jointly by the City Councils of Glasgow and Edinburgh and staged in both cities. Stanley Baxter, one of Britain's top pantomimist, performed at the King's in the 1980s in Cinderella, which he wrote and directed, and returned for his final pantomime appearance in 1991. First Family Entertainment took over production of the annual pantomime in 2005. The current productions comprise a 70 performance run during the festive period, until mid-January. Since 2017, the pantomime has been produced by Crossroads Pantomimes, formerly Qdos.

Gerard Kelly was for 20 years a regular performer at the King's Theatre pantomimes, taking the lead comic role every year. Elaine C Smith appeared regularly between 1996 and 2005, and has since been involved as an associate producer. During her time starring in the pantomimes, she often took on the role of dame, making the King's Theatre production somewhat unusual in having a woman playing the dame role, traditionally played by a man. Scottish comedian Karen Dunbar has taken on the leading female comic role in recent years. She started in 2007 as Nanny Begood in Sleeping Beauty, she then appeared in Cinderella in 2008, Aladdin in 2009, and again as Nanny Begood in 2011. Dunbar created the role of Mrs McConkey in Cinderella in 2012 and most recently appeared as The Slave of The Ring in Aladdin in 2013. Elaine C Smith returned to the King's Theatre pantomime in 2017, again playing the dame role, alongside Johnny Mac.

== Pantomime production details ==
- 2025/2026 - The Little Mermaid
- 2024/2025 - Peter Pan, 60th anniversary of the King's Pantomime.
- 2023/2024 - Snow White and The Seven Dwarfs
- 2022/2023 - Beauty & The Beast
- 2021/2022 - Cinderella
- 2020/2021 - CANCELLED Due to COVID-19
- 2019/2020 - Jack & The Beanstalk
- 2018/2019 - Aladdin
- 2017/2018 - Sleeping Beauty
- 2016/2017 - Cinderella
- 2015/2016 - Snow White and The Seven Dwarfs
- 2014/2015 - Peter Pan, the 50th anniversary of the King's Pantomime.
- 2013/2014 - Aladdin
- 2012/2013 - Cinderella
- 2011/2012 - Sleeping Beauty
- 2010/2011 - Snow White and The Seven Dwarfs
- 2009/2010 - Aladdin - starring Gerard Kelly - the last show before his death.
- 2008/2009 – Cinderella
- 2007/2008 – Sleeping Beauty
- 2006/2007 – Aladdin
- 2005/2006 – Cinderella
- 2004/2005 – Mother Goose
- 2003/2004 – Sleeping Beauty
- 2002/2003 – Aladdin
- 2001/2002 – Babes in the Wood
- 2000/2001 – Cinderella
- 1999/2000 – Mother Goose 3 December 1999 - 22 January 2000 - Starring Gerard Kelly, Barbara Rafferty, Eileen McCallum, Ford Kiernan, Greg Hemphill,
- 1998/1999 – Sleeping Beauty 4 December 1998 - 16 January 1999 - Starring Elaine C. Smith, Jonathan Watson, Barbara Rafferty, Juliet Cadzow, Dave Anderson, Billy Boyd
- 1997/1998 – Aladdin 5 December 1997 - 17 January 1998 - Starring Elaine C. Smith, Gerard Kelly, Grant Stott
- 1996/1997 – Cinderella 6 December 1996 - 18 January 1997 - Starring Elaine C. Smith, Gerard Kelly, Barbara Rafferty, John Leslie, Grant Stott, Eileen McCallum, Jackie Farrell, Jan Wilson
- 1995/1996 – Babes In The Wood 14 December 1995 - 3 February 1996 – starring Cannon and Ball, Jimmy Logan, Grant Stott, Vivienne Carlyle
- 1994/1995 – Sleeping Beauty 8 December 1994 - 4 February 1995 - Starring Les Dennis, Gerard Kelly, Barbara Rafferty, Jonathan Watson, Jan Wilson
- 1993/1994 – Dick Whittington 2 December 1993 - 29 January 1994 - Starring Allan Stewart, Christopher Biggins, Jimmy Chisholm
- 1992/1993 – Aladdin 26 November 1992 - 30 January 1993 - Starring Gerard Kelly, Una McLean, Jonathan Watson, Emerson and Jayne
- 1991/1992 – Cinderella – 10 December 1991 - 22 February 1992 starring Stanley Baxter – his last ever stage performance
- 1990/1991 – Babes in the Wood – Starring Gerard Kelly, Iain McColl, Una McLean
- 1989/1990 – Mother Goose 28 November 1989 - 10 February 1990 - Starring Walter Carr, Gerard Kelly, Jan Wilson
- 1988/1989 – Jack and the Beanstalk 29 November 1988 - 11 February 1989 - Starring Jimmy Logan, Una McLean, John Ramage
- 1987/1988 – Cinderella 23 November 1987 - 6 February 1988 - Starring Rikki Fulton, Walter Carr, Jan Wilson, Jackie Farrell
- 1986/1987 – Aladdin 24 November 1986 - 7 February 1987 - Starring Stanley Baxter
- 1985/1986 – Sinbad the Sailor 25 November 1985 - 8 February 1986. starring Johnny Beattie, Christian, Una McLean, Emerson and Jayne
- 1984/1985 – Sleeping Beauty - Starring Rikki Fulton, Walter Carr, Gregor Fisher
- 1983/1984 – Mother Goose - Starring Stanley Baxter
- 1982/1983 – Jack and the Beanstalk 29 November 1981 - 12 February 1982. Starring Jimmy Logan
- 1981/1982 – Babes in the Wood 30 November 1980 - 13 February 1981. Starring Rikki Fulton, Jack Milroy, Mary Lee, Gregor Fisher, Tony Roper
- 1980/1981 – Cinderella - Starring Stanley Baxter, Angus Lennie
- 1979/1980 – Sinbad the Sailor 3 December 1979 - 16 February 1980. Starring Christian, Johnny Beattie, Una McLean
- 1978/1979 – Aladdin - Starring Jimmy Logan, Peter Kelly
- 1977/1978 – Sleeping Beauty - Starring Rikki Fulton, Walter Carr, Una McLean, Margo Cunningham
- 1976/1977 – Jack and the Beanstalk - Starring Stanley Baxter, Peter Kelly
- 1975/1976 – Babes in the Wood - Starring Jimmy Logan
- 1974/1975 – Robinson Crusoe - Starring Rikki Fulton, Walter Carr, Una McLean, Tony Roper
- 1973/1974 – Cinderella - Starring Jimmy Logan
- 1972/1973 – Aladdin - Starring Denny Willis
- 1971/1972 – Mother Goose - Starring Stanley Baxter
- 1968/1969 – The World of Jamie - (Howard & Wyndham 'Scottish' Pantomime) - Starring Kenneth McKellar
- 1967/1968 – Aladdin - Starring Rikki Fulton
- 1964/1965 – A Wish for Jamie - (Howard & Wyndham 'Scottish' Pantomime) - Starring Kenneth McKellar, Johnny Beattie, Fay Lenore

== See also ==
- Culture in Glasgow
- List of Category A listed buildings in Glasgow
- List of theatres in Scotland
