= Off the Ball (radio series) =

- Running time: 120 minutes
- Country of origin: Scotland
- Language(s): English
- Home station: BBC Radio Scotland
- Hosted by: Stuart Cosgrove & Tam Cowan
- Original release: 13 August 1994
- Opening theme: "Let Me Clear My Throat" by DJ Kool
- Website: Off the Ball
- Podcast: Off the Ball podcast

Off the Ball is a radio show broadcast on Saturdays and Sundays from 12:00pm – 2:00pm on BBC Radio Scotland. It takes a satirical and sideways view at football in Scotland, self-styling itself as "The most petty and ill-informed sports programme on radio!".

== Background ==
The show began in August 1994, and is currently (since 1995) presented by broadcaster and writer Stuart Cosgrove, a fan of St Johnstone, and newspaper columnist Tam Cowan, a Motherwell supporter, plus at least two weekly guests; usually one from the world of Scottish football and one from Scottish culture. When the show first began, it was hosted by Cowan and comedians Greg Hemphill and Sanjeev Kohli, who later acknowledged that they did not have the depth of football knowledge required to give credibility to the format in addition to its humorous aspects, which Cosgrove was successful in providing. The show was known as On the Ball when it aired from 1:30pm until 2pm prior to the 3pm matches being played on Saturdays, with the post-football show being called Off the Ball.

Occasionally, other presenters will cover for Cosgrove or Cowan if they are not available, including comedian Ray Bradshaw, Jonathan Sutherland and Chick Young.

The BBC briefly suspended Cowan from the programme in 2013 following controversy over remarks he made about women's football in his Daily Record newspaper column.

== Features ==
Listener interaction is always encouraged on the show, with the presenters asking for contributions on a variety of football and non-football related topics. Limericks are often asked for, with the first line usually given by Cowan or Cosgrove.

=== Team of the Week ===
Listeners are invited to contribute names of football players for a subject suggested by Cowan. For example, if the subject was "The Female Fashion XI", then players such as Alan Bra-zil and Lionel Dress-i would be in the team. In a long-running joke, former Clyde player Tommy Ring is almost always included in the team.

=== Terracing Teaser ===
The Terracing Teaser is a weekly competition, with a question usually suggested by Cowan, in the format of "If x is the answer, then what is the question?". Cowan, Cosgrove and a guest choose a winner, and they win an Off the Ball mug.

=== The Off the Ball Jukebox ===
A song is always chosen to end the Saturday programme based on listeners' suggestions on a subject suggested by Cowan, usually related to a news event from that week. On the Sunday show, songs with a particular theme are chosen by the listeners and played in full, with one selection each from Cowan, Cosgrove and the studio guest.

=== What Does 'X' Mean to Me ===
Listeners are invited to share their favourite memories of visiting a particular town or city in Scotland. The location varies for each episode and is usually linked to the guest's birthplace or the team they support. Occasionally, the location will be chosen from a topical news story and sometimes it may further afield than Scotland.

=== Past features ===
During the COVID-19 pandemic, National Clinical Director of the Scottish Government, Professor Jason Leitch, was a regular guest on the Saturday programme, answering listeners' questions about the pandemic. The guest in the studio also had the opportunity to ask Professor Leitch a question.

== Podcast ==
A weekly podcast of the show is produced and is available on a Saturday. The show is also available on the BBC Sounds app for thirty days after the first broadcast. A podcast of the Sunday show is also produced and is made available during the following week.

== Book ==
A spin-off annual was published in 1999, co-written by Cosgrove and Cowan. No other annuals were subsequently published.

== Theme tune ==
The programme's theme tune is "Let Me Clear My Throat" by DJ Kool, followed by a snatch of the theme music from The Odd Couple.
