= I, Lovett =

British television series

- Genre: Sitcom
- Written by: Norman Lovett; Ian Pattison
- Directed by: Ron Bain
- Starring: Norman Lovett; Dicken Ashworth; Sara Cooper
- Voices of: Mary Riggans; Leon Sinden; Geoffrey Hughes
- Country of origin: United Kingdom
- Original language: English
- No. of series: 1
- No. of episodes: 7

Production
- Producer: Colin Gilbert

Original release
- Network: BBC2
- Release: 9 June 1989 – 28 April 1993

I, Lovett is a BBC television sitcom written by Norman Lovett and Ian Pattison. Seven episodes were broadcast, a pilot on 9 June 1989 and a six-episode series between 24 March and 28 April 1993.

== Plot ==
The series stars Norman Lovett playing a version of himself who is an inventor living in a world of surrealism with his talking dog, voiced by Geoffrey Hughes; a spider, voiced by Mary Riggans; and inanimate objects.

== Production ==
In 1989 a one-off pilot episode was made for the anthology series Comic Asides, the BBC commissioned a full series which was broadcast four years later in 1993. In total of seven episodes were made each one was shown on BBC2, directed by Ron Bain and produced by Colin Gilbert.

== Episode list ==
No. overall	No. in series	Title	Directed by	Written by	Original release date
1	—	"Pilot"	Colin Gilbert	Norman Lovett	9 June 1989
2	1	"The Snowman"	Ron Bain	Norman Lovett and Ian Pattison	24 March 1993
3	2	"Crime & Punishment"	Ron Bain	Norman Lovett and Ian Pattison	31 March 1993
4	3	"Baldy"	Ron Bain	Norman Lovett and Ian Pattison	7 April 1993
5	4	"Romance"	Ron Bain	Norman Lovett and Ian Pattison	14 April 1993
6	5	"Imagine"	Ron Bain	Norman Lovett and Ian Pattison	21 April 1993
7	6	"The Marrow"	Ron Bain	Norman Lovett and Ian Pattison	28 April 1993
