= Graeme Sutherland =

Dr Graeme Sutherland (born 25 December 1964) is a free-lance writer and academic, mainly specialising in broadcast comedy and short stories.

== Comedy Writing ==
Sutherland contributed to the BBC Radio 4 satirical sketch show Week Ending and three series of the BBC Scotland TV comedy sketch show The Karen Dunbar Show.

Sutherland's script Hit (co-written with Philip Cartwright) reached the finals of the BBC's Talent 2000 Situation Comedy competition.

== Academic Writing ==
Sutherland contributed the "Mr Angry" chapter of Working with Anger: A Constructivist Approach (Wiley, 2006 - Peter Cummins, Editor), an academic psychology reader.

In 2018, Sutherland graduated as Doctor of Education from the University of Warwick, his thesis is entitled: Grade decisions: how observers make judgements in the observation of teaching and learning. The paper found that the concept of Wisdom of Practice was at the heart of Teacher Observation and that observers appeared to reach judgements holistically based on largely intuitive and automatic access to a wealth of theory, experience and practical knowledge.

== DVD ==
The Best of the Karen Dunbar Show - Series 1 (John Williams Productions DVD. Released: 17/02/03)
