= Elaine C. Smith =

Scottish actor/singer/performer (b. 1958)

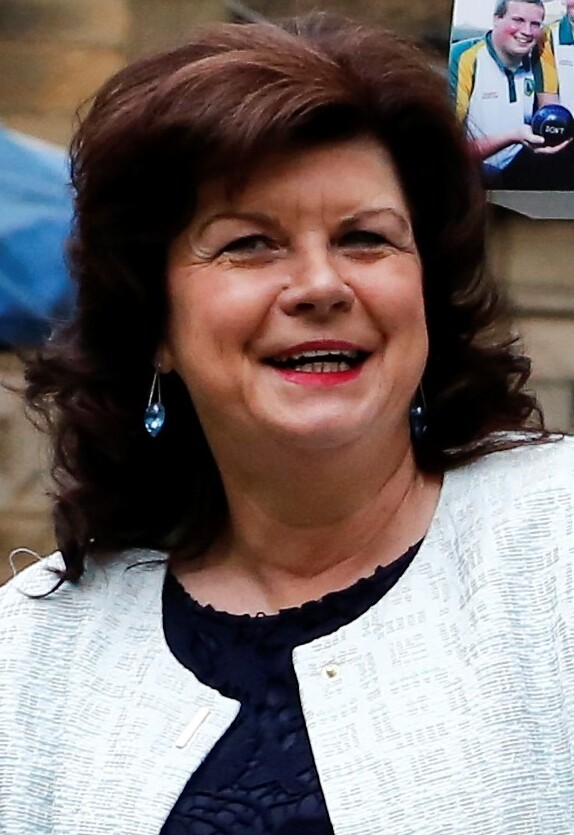
- Smith in 2015
- Born: Elaine Constance Smith; 2 August 1958 (age 68); Newarthill, Lanarkshire, Scotland
- Education: Royal Conservatoire of Scotland & Queen Margaret University
- Occupations: Actress; comedian
- Spouse: Bob Morton (m. 1988)
- Children: 2

Elaine Constance Smith (born 2 August 1958) is a Scottish actress and comedian. She is known for her roles in the BBC Scotland sitcoms City Lights (1984–1991), Rab C. Nesbitt (1988–2014), and Two Doors Down (2013–present), winning a BAFTA Scotland award for the latter. In 2012, Smith co-wrote and starred in I Dreamed a Dream, a stage production about the life and career of Scottish singer Susan Boyle. She has campaigned for Scottish independence and continues to be a supporter.

Over the course of her career, Smith has become a staple of Scottish television, and was appointed to the Scottish Broadcasting Commission by the Scottish Government in recognition to her extensive experience and knowledge of broadcasting in Scotland. In 2025, she received the Outstanding Achievement Award at The Pantomime Awards for her work in pantomime performance, and was awarded the Freedom of Glasgow by Glasgow City Council in March 2025.

== Education and early career ==
Smith attended the Royal Scottish Academy of Music and Drama and then completed a teacher training course at the Moray House of Education in Edinburgh, where she then worked as a drama teacher at Firrhill High School for three years. In 2002 she gained a BA Acting degree from Edinburgh's Queen Margaret University School of Drama & Creative Industries.

== Career ==
=== Television ===
In 1984, she made her TV debut on the BBC Scotland comedy Laugh??? I Nearly Paid My Licence Fee; however, her first major television appearance came in 1986 as a star of the sketch show Naked Video. Made by BBC Scotland, it was shown throughout the UK on BBC2. In between seasons of Naked Video, Smith also starred in the Scottish sitcom City Lights, which ran for seven years on the BBC. Smith is best known for her role as Mary 'Mary Doll' Nesbitt in the BBC sitcom Rab C. Nesbitt, a series based on characters in a Naked Video sketch. Launched in 1990 and set in Glasgow, the show ran for nine years on BBC Two. It was revived for a Christmas special in 2008, two new series in 2010 and 2011, and a New Year special in 2014. From 1997 to 2001, Smith starred as Rosa in the BBC children's television show, Hububb.

Smith has appeared in the BBC dramas Two Thousand Acres of Sky and 55 Degrees North, performed alongside Helena Bonham Carter in the British film Women Talking Dirty, and toured Scotland with her stand-up comedy show. In October 2007, she appeared in an episode of the Jennifer Saunders sitcom The Life and Times of Vivienne Vyle. In 2010 she took part in an STV tribute to Scottish actor Gerard Kelly. In January 2011, she appeared on Celebrity Mastermind with singer-songwriter Joni Mitchell as her specialist subject. She finished second on the programme.

Since 2015, Smith has presented a documentary-style show entitled Burdz Eye View, broadcast by STV, in which she tours Scotland with her comedy act and talks about Scottish life and culture. For her work on the series, Smith was awarded a Royal Television Society Award. A special episode, Burdz Eye View of Hogmanay was broadcast in 2015, welcoming viewers into the New Year. In 2015, Smith had a part in the third series of Kay Mellor's BBC drama The Syndicate.

In 2016, she began starring in the BBC Scotland sitcom Two Doors Down, playing the role of Christine O'Neill, and in 2018, she won the BAFTA Scotland award for Best Actress – Television for her performance.

=== Theatre ===
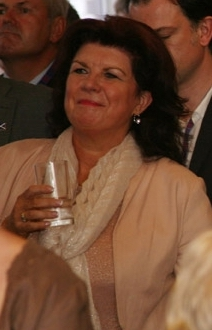
Smith in 2012 at the opening of Scotland House in London

For many years Smith was a regular in pantomime at the Kings' Theatre, Glasgow, starring alongside Gerard Kelly in performances such as Aladdin, Mother Goose and Sleeping Beauty. More recently, she has appeared in her own seasonal show, 12 Nights of Christmas at the Òran Mór, Glasgow. She has also toured Scotland in straight plays, notably with Andy Gray, in The Woman Who Cooked Her Husband, Two and The Rise and Fall of Little Voice. Other Scottish theatre roles include The Steamie, Guys and Dolls and Shirley Valentine. She has also performed in new works at the Tron Theatre, Glasgow and the Traverse Theatre, Edinburgh.

In September 2008 she began touring the UK in a stage version of the hit British film Calendar Girls, along with Lynda Bellingham, Patricia Hodge, Siân Phillips, Gaynor Faye and Brigit Forsyth. The show opened in London's West End at the Noël Coward Theatre in April 2009. The original cast left the show at the end of July 2009, but Smith returned in a different role as part of a national tour in 2010. From 2009 to 2016, Smith starred in Christmas pantomime at His Majesty's Theatre, Aberdeen. In 2017 she returned to pantomimes at the King's Theatre, Glasgow.

In 2012, she played Scottish singer Susan Boyle in the touring musical I Dreamed a Dream (which she co-wrote with Alan McHugh), based on Boyle's life and rise to fame. There were plans to tour the show in Australia in 2013 but these were cancelled. In 2016, Smith toured Scotland as Miss Hannigan in the musical Annie. In 2017, she toured Scotland in a musical version of Kay Mellor's Fat Friends.

== Personal life and honours ==
Smith lives in Glasgow. In August 2007 she was appointed to the Scottish Broadcasting Commission established by the Scottish Government. Until 2009 Smith wrote a weekly column in the Sunday Mail newspaper. In late 2009 her autobiography Nothing Like a Dame was published. She was awarded the honorary degree of Doctor of the University by the University of Glasgow in 2008. In October 2024, it was confirmed by Glasgow City Council that Smith would receive the Freedom of Glasgow in 2025 as part of the city's 850th birthday celebrations, making Smith the first female recipient of the honour since Anna Maxwell in 1969 she said she "was honoured" to have been granted the title

== Activism ==
In May 2007, Smith declared her support for Scottish independence by aligning herself with the Scottish National Party. She had previously been a member of the Labour Party but left due to its failure to publicly back the 1984–85 miners' strike. She is a supporter of the charities Zero Tolerance and Relationships Scotland. She is the patron of the Women and Girls' Programme at Celtic FC. In 2021 she became patron of the 1896 barque Glenlee on its 125th birthday. The ship's figurehead had been named Mary Doll after Smith's character Mary Doll Nesbitt.

== Filmography ==
=== Television ===
| Year | Title | Role | Notes |
|---|---|---|---|
| 1984 | End of the Line | Annemarie | 1 episode |
| 1984 | Laugh??? I Nearly Paid My Licence Fee | Various roles | |
| 1984–1991 | City Lights | Irene | |
| 1986–1987 | Naked Video | | |
| 1987 | Dramarama | Mum | 1 episode |
| 1988–2014 | Rab C. Nesbitt | Mary "Mary Doll" Nesbitt | Series regular; 67 episodes |
| 1992 | Simon's Challenge | | |
| 1997–2001 | Hububb | Rosa | |
| 2001–2003 | Two Thousand Acres of Sky | Marjorie McGowan | |
| 2005 | 55 Degrees North | Irene McGinley | |
| 2007 | The Life and Times of Vivienne Vyle | Rosie | |
| 2015 | The Syndicate | Valerie Hardcastle | Third series |
| 2016–present | Two Doors Down | Christine O'Neal | Series regular; 46 episodes BAFTA Scotland Award for Best Actress – Television |
| 2022 | Mayflies | Barbara | |
| 2025 | Sister Boniface Mysteries | Jeanie McIntyre | 1 episode |

=== Film ===
| Year | Title | Role | Notes |
|---|---|---|---|
| 1984 | Bless My Soul | | |
| 1999 | Coming Soon | Paisley Johnson | |
| 1999 | Women Talking Dirty | Irene O'Brien | |
| 2003 | 16 Years of Alcohol | AA Meeting Woman | as Elanie C. Smith |
| 2006 | Nina's Heavenly Delights | Auntie Mamie | |
| 2012 | Night Is Day: The Movie | Katherine Munro | |
| 2013 | Mrs Cummings | Fiona | Short |
| 2015 | The Wrong Guy | Agnus | Short |
| 2024 | Broono | Mrs. Brown | |
| 2024 | Damaged | Elizabeth Walsh | |
| 2025 | Govan Fair Queen | Linda | Short |

== Publications ==
Smith, Elaine C. (2009). Nothing Like a Dame. Mainstream. ISBN 978-1845964559.
