= Tom Urie =

Scottish actor and musician (born 1969)

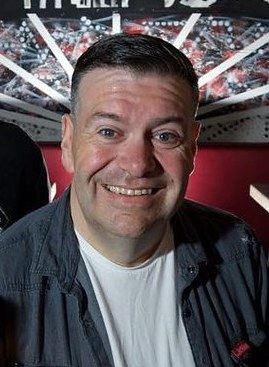
- Urie during an event in Paisley.
- Born: Tom Urie; 1 March 1969 (age 57); Paisley, Renfrewshire, Scotland
- Occupations: Singer–songwriter, actor
- Years active: 1997–present
- Known for: Bob O'Hara in River City; Various in The Karen Dunbar Show

Tom Urie (born 1 March 1969) is a Scottish actor and musician. He is best known for his role as Big Bob (Bob O'Hara) in the BBC Scotland soap opera River City. In November 2019, Urie played Gordie in the BBC Scotland drama Guilt.

== Career ==
=== Chewin' the Fat ===
Urie began his career in the Scottish sketch show Chewin' the Fat portraying various roles within the show. In 2002, he starred as Captain Ortego in the short-lived sitcom Snoddy which was broadcast in 2002. He returned to sketch show fame in 2003 after he played various roles within The Karen Dunbar Show. Later in 2003, he appeared as Martin in the popular Scottish sitcom Still Game.

=== River City ===
From 2010 to 2014, he played the role as Bob O'Hara, or most commonly known as "Big Bob" in the popular BBC Scotland soap opera, River City.

=== Music career and Tom Urie ===
Urie signed a two record recording deal with Scottish record label, The Music Kitchen in 2010. His debut album, Tom Urie was released in 2011.

The album features duets with Eddi Reader and Michelle McManus. Speaking to the Daily Record ahead of the albums release, Tom said: “All the songs are very special to me in different ways. Some because they were favourites of Dad’s and we lost him to a stroke seven years ago. My version of Beatles classic Blackbird is included because I grew up listening to them because of my Uncle Jim. Mamas and Papas’ Dream a Little Dream and Good Year For The Roses with Eddi came about because her mum is such a big River City fan. We all met, I blurted out ‘I’d love to sing with you’, and nearly fainted when she said ‘yes’. And Maggie Bell and BA Robertson's Hold Me was such a huge favourite of mine and my pal Michelle McManus, it was a stick-on for a duet.”

== Personal life ==
Urie was born in 1969 in Paisley and has a brother and sister. Urie studied music at Perth Rock College in 1988 and spent the following years as a DJ. He has also spoken openly about being diagnosed with autism

== Discography ==
- Tom Urie (2011)

== Filmography ==
- Chewin' the Fat (1999) - Various roles
- Snoddy (2002) - Captain Ortego
- The Karen Dunbar Show (2003–06) - Various roles
- Still Game (2003) - Martin
- Burke & Hare - (Daft Jamie) Heart attack man
- River City (2009–14, 2016) - Big Bob O'Hara
- Doctors (2016) - Tom Mears
- T2: Trainspotting (2017) - Big Bear
- Guilt (2019) - Gordie Gemmel
