= The Karen Dunbar Show =

Scottish comedy sketch show

- Title card (2003–2004)
- Written by: Karen Dunbar; Gordon Robertson; Graeme Sutherland
- Directed by: Ron Bain; Iain Davidson
- Starring: Karen Dunbar; Tom Urie; Gabriel Quigley; Marj Hogarth; Sandy Welch; James Young; Leah MacRae; Donald McLeary
- Country of origin: United Kingdom (Scotland)
- No. of series: 4
- No. of episodes: 22

Production
- Running time: 30 minutes

Original release
- Network: BBC One Scotland
- Release: 9 January 2003 – 7 April 2006

The Karen Dunbar Show was a Scottish comedy sketch show that aired on BBC One Scotland, starring comedian and actress Karen Dunbar. It was produced by BBC Scotland. It also starred actor and musician Tom Urie.

== Concept ==
Recurring characters in the show included Shoeless Josie, a blonde drunkard, often seen carrying a bag of chips, and Almost Angelic, a Pub 'n' Club duo from Ayrshire, consisting of Angela Silvery and her tolerant husband Ricky.

== Episodes ==
There have been three series of 6 episodes each (2003–2005) and one, the 2006 series, consisting of four. Directors included Ron Bain and Iain Davidson. Writers contributed to the series included: Gordon Robertson (2005), Graeme Sutherland (2003–2005) and Ben Verth (2005).

- Series 1: 9 January 2003 to 12 February 2003.
- Series 2: 20 February 2004 to 26 March 2004.
- Series 3: 20 May 2005 to 24 June 2005.
- Series 4: 17 March 2006 to 7 April 2006.

== DVD release ==
Only Series 1 has received a DVD release (in the UK).
