= A Kick Up the Eighties =

Television series

- Opening 1981 title card
- Starring: Robbie Coltrane; Tracey Ullman; Richard Stilgoe; Miriam Margolyes; Rik Mayall; Ron Bain; Roger Sloman
- Country of origin: United Kingdom
- No. of series: 2
- No. of episodes: 10

Production
- Running time: 30 minutes
- Production company: BBC Scotland

Original release
- Network: BBC2
- Release: 21 September 1981 – 24 January 1984

Related
- Laugh??? I Nearly Paid My Licence Fee

A Kick Up the Eighties is a British comedy sketch show originally broadcast on BBC2 from 1981 to 1984. It starred Robbie Coltrane (series 2), Tracey Ullman, Richard Stilgoe (series 1), Miriam Margolyes, Rik Mayall, Ron Bain and Roger Sloman.

The show was created by Tom Gutteridge (producer/director) and Sean Hardie (executive producer). Colin Gilbert was script editor. Series One, comprising six shows, was broadcast on BBC2 from 21 September 1981 to 26 October 1981. Series Two, comprising four shows, was broadcast on BBC2 between 3 January 1984 and 24 January 1984. A contemporary sketch show with a nod to the then emerging wave of alternative comedy, a strong team combined to perform short sketches and various musical parodies.

The show was the first break into television for Rik Mayall, who played an over-excited, anorak-wearing investigative reporter Kevin Turvey. To maintain the illusion that his character was real, Mayall's name did not appear in the closing credits whereas Kevin Turvey's did. The show was also an important early step in Tracey Ullman's television comedy career (along with Three of a Kind, first broadcast a few months before). Peter Capaldi, a trained graphic artist, contributed to designing the show's opening sequence prior to launching his own career as an actor. The first series won a Scottish BAFTA for Best Entertainment Programme in 1982.

For the second series, Colin Gilbert was brought in as producer, his debut TV production with the newly formed BBC Scotland Comedy Unit. Richard Stilgoe had left the show and Robbie Coltrane took his place. This second series was more slick and competent than the first, and Coltrane was praised for his vocal range, powerful delivery and natural acting technique.

A compilation episode was broadcast on 31 December 1987, entitled "A Kick Up The Bells". On 31 December 1998 BBC2 screened "A Kick Up The Archive", a further highlights compilation.
