= Robbie Coltrane =

Scottish actor (1950–2022)

Robbie Coltrane OBE
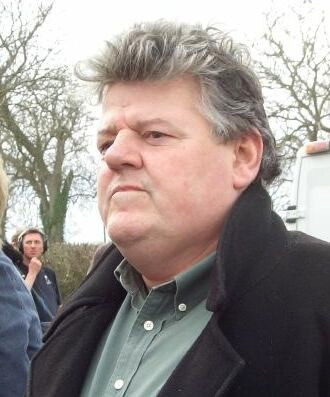
- Coltrane in 2007
- Born: Anthony Robin McMillan; 31 March 1950; Rutherglen, Lanarkshire, Scotland
- Died: 14 October 2022 (aged 72); Larbert, Falkirk, Scotland
- Education: Glasgow School of Art
- Occupation: Actor
- Years active: 1978–2022
- Spouse: Rhona Gemmell (m. 1999; div. 2003)
- Children: 2

Anthony Robin McMillan (31 March 1950 – 14 October 2022), known professionally as Robbie Coltrane, was a Scottish actor, comedian, and author. He is best known for his role as Rubeus Hagrid in the Harry Potter film series (2001–2011) and as Dr. Edward "Fitz" Fitzgerald in the crime drama series Cracker (1993–1996, 2006).

Coltrane started his career appearing alongside Hugh Laurie, Stephen Fry and Emma Thompson in the sketch series Alfresco and The Comic Strip together with actors like Peter Richardson and Adrian Edmondson. In 1987, he starred in the BBC miniseries Tutti Frutti with Thompson, for which he received his first British Academy Television Award for Best Actor nomination. Coltrane then gained national prominence starring as criminal psychologist Dr. Eddie "Fitz" Fitzgerald in the ITV television series Cracker, a role that saw him receive the BAFTA Television Award for Best Actor in three consecutive years from 1994. Coltrane and Michael Gambon are the only actors to have won this award three consecutive times. In 2006, Coltrane placed eleventh in ITV's public poll of TV's 50 Greatest Stars. A decade later, he received critical acclaim and a fourth BAFTA Television Award for Best Actor nomination for his performance as a disgraced comedian in the four-part Channel 4 series National Treasure.

From 2001 to 2011, Coltrane portrayed Rubeus Hagrid in the Harry Potter film series, which brought him worldwide fame, with first film in the series gaining him a nomination for BAFTA Award for Best Supporting Actor. In addition to Harry Potter, in film he is known for playing Russian gangster Valentin Zukovsky in the James Bond films GoldenEye (1995) and The World Is Not Enough (1999). He also appeared in: Caravaggio (1986), Mona Lisa (1986), Danny, the Champion of the World (1989), From Hell (2001), Ocean's Twelve (2004) and The Brothers Bloom (2008). Occasionally, he lent his voice to roles in animated films, including The Gruffalo (2009), Arthur Christmas (2011) and the Pixar film Brave (2012).

For his services to drama, Coltrane was appointed an OBE in the 2006 New Year Honours by Queen Elizabeth II, and in 2011, he was honoured for his "outstanding contribution" to film by BAFTA Scotland.

== Early life and education ==
Coltrane was born Anthony Robin McMillan on 31 March 1950 in Rutherglen, Scotland, the son of Jean Ross Howie, a teacher and pianist, and Ian Baxter McMillan, a GP who also served as a forensic police surgeon. He had an older sister, Annie, and a younger sister, Jane. Coltrane was the great-grandson of Scottish businessman Thomas W. Howie and the nephew of businessman Forbes Howie.

He started his education at Belmont House School in Newton Mearns before boarding at Glenalmond College, a private school in Perthshire. Though he later described his experiences there as deeply unhappy, he played for the first XV rugby, was head of the school's debating society, and won prizes for his art. He studied painting at the Glasgow School of Art.

Coltrane later called for private schools to be banned and used to be known as "Red Robbie", rebelling against his conservative upbringing through involvement with Amnesty International, Greenpeace, the Labour Party, and the Campaign for Nuclear Disarmament.

== Career ==
Coltrane moved into acting in his early twenties, adopting the stage name Coltrane (in tribute to jazz saxophonist John Coltrane) and working in theatre and comedy. He appeared in the first stage production of John Byrne's The Slab Boys, at the Traverse Theatre in Edinburgh (1978). His comedic abilities brought him roles in The Comic Strip Presents (1982–2012) series (in 1993 he directed and co-wrote the episode "Jealousy" for series 5), as well as the comedy sketch show Alfresco (1983–1984). In 1984 he appeared in A Kick Up the Eighties (Series 2) and Laugh??? I Nearly Paid My Licence Fee, and is credited as a writer for both.

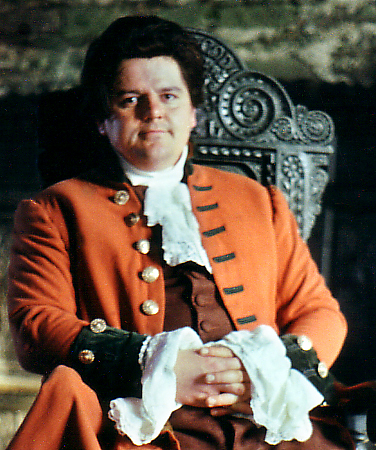
Coltrane in costume in the 1980s

Coltrane moved into roles in films such as Flash Gordon (1980), Death Watch (1980), Balham, Gateway to the South (1981), Scrubbers (1983), Krull (1983), The Supergrass (1985), Defence of the Realm (1985), Absolute Beginners (1986), Mona Lisa (1986), and appeared as "Annabelle" in The Fruit Machine (1988).

On television, he appeared in The Young Ones, Tutti Frutti (1987), as Samuel Johnson in Blackadder the Third (1987) (a role he later reprised in the more serious Boswell and Johnson's Tour of the Western Islands (1993)), LWT's The Robbie Coltrane Special (1989, which he also co-wrote), and in other stand-up and sketch comedy shows. He played the part of Falstaff in Kenneth Branagh's Henry V (1989). The same year he starred opposite Jeremy Irons in the television film adaptation of Roald Dahl's children's book Danny, the Champion of the World.

He co-starred with Eric Idle in Nuns on the Run (1990) and played the Pope in The Pope Must Die (1991). He also played a would-be private detective obsessed with Humphrey Bogart in the TV film The Bogie Man (1992). His roles continued in the 1990s with the TV series Cracker (1993–1996, returning in 2006 for a one-off special), in which he starred as forensic psychologist Dr. Edward "Fitz" Fitzgerald. The role won him three BAFTA awards.

Roles in bigger films followed: the James Bond films GoldenEye (1995) and The World Is Not Enough (1999), a supporting role in From Hell (2001), as well as half-giant Rubeus Hagrid in the Harry Potter films (2001–2011). J. K. Rowling, author of the Harry Potter books, had Coltrane at the top of her list to play Hagrid and, when asked whom she would like to see in the role, responded "Robbie Coltrane for Hagrid" in one quick breath.

Coltrane also presented a number of documentary programmes for the British ITV network based around his twin passions for travel and transportation. Coltrane in a Cadillac (1993) saw him cross North America from Los Angeles to New York City behind the wheel of a 1951 Cadillac Series 62 coupe convertible, a journey of 3,765 miles (6,059 km), which he completed in 32 days.

In 1997, Coltrane appeared in a series of six programmes under the title Coltrane's Planes and Automobiles, in which he extolled the virtues of the steam engine, the diesel engine, the supercharger, the V8 engine, the two-stroke engine, and the jet engine. In these programmes he dismantled and rebuilt several engines. He also single-handedly removed the engine from a Trabant car in 23 minutes.

In September 2006, Coltrane was voted No. 11 in ITV's TV's 50 Greatest Stars and sixth in a poll of 2000 adults across the UK to find the 'most famous Scot', behind the Loch Ness Monster, Robert Burns, Sean Connery, Robert the Bruce, and William Wallace.

In August 2007, Coltrane presented a series for ITV called B-Road Britain, in which he travelled from London to Glasgow, stopping in towns and villages along the way.

Coltrane voiced characters in several animated films, including The Tale of Despereaux (2008) and Pixar's Brave (2012), as well as the title roles of Gooby and The Gruffalo (both 2009).

In 2016, Coltrane starred in National Treasure, a four-part drama in which he played a former comedian accused of historic sexual offences. He was nominated for Best Actor at the 2017 British Academy Television Awards, and won in the category at the Royal Television Society Programme Awards. Maureen Ryan of Variety wrote that "Coltrane does a masterful job of depicting every nuance of the character, whose wicked sense of humor masks a startling, and possibly intentional, lack of self-awareness".

== Personal life ==
Coltrane met Rhona Gemmell, then a student at Glasgow School of Art, in the late 1980s. The couple had two children. Coltrane and Gemmell married in 1999, but separated in 2003 and later divorced, although they remained close.

In February 2005, Coltrane appeared at a Scottish Labour event, in which he said on the question of Scottish independence: "It's a very complicated issue. I would think, probably, eventually I would like to see independence but only an independent Labour Scotland", while adding, "It would have to be terribly carefully considered. There are all sorts of advantages to being part of the United Kingdom and it would be foolish to throw it away immediately" and "I have no time for the nationalists – all they can do is split the vote for home rule and let the Tories in".

Coltrane expressed support for J. K. Rowling over critics' accusations of transphobia. In a Radio Times interview, he said that he felt that she had not said anything offensive, but rather that there was "a whole Twitter generation of people who hang around waiting to be offended." He declined to elaborate, saying that he "[didn't] want to get involved in all of that because of all the hate mail and all that shit, which [he didn't] need at [his] time of life."

=== Health and death ===
Coltrane suffered from osteoarthritis in later life. He said he was in "constant pain all day" in 2016, and, from 2019 onwards, he used a wheelchair.

Coltrane died at Forth Valley Royal Hospital in Larbert, on 14 October 2022, at the age of 72. He had been ill for two years prior to his death. His death was registered by his ex-wife Rhona Gemmell; the death certificate listed the causes as multiple organ failure complicated by sepsis, a lower respiratory tract infection, and heart block. He had also been diagnosed with type 2 diabetes.

== Filmography ==
=== Film ===
| Year | Title | Role | Notes |
|---|---|---|---|
| 1980 | Flash Gordon | Man at airfield | |
| 1980 | Death Watch | Limousine Driver | |
| 1981 | Subway Riders | Crime Detective | |
| 1982 | Britannia Hospital | Striking worker on picket line | Cameo role |
| 1982 | Scrubbers | Puff Guts | |
| 1983 | Ghost Dance | George | |
| 1983 | Krull | Rhun | |
| 1984 | Chinese Boxes | Harwood | |
| 1985 | National Lampoon's European Vacation | Man in bathroom | |
| 1985 | The Supergrass | Det. Sgt. Troy | |
| 1985 | Defence of the Realm | Leo McAskey | |
| 1986 | Caravaggio | Scipione | |
| 1986 | Absolute Beginners | Mario | |
| 1986 | Mona Lisa | Thomas | |
| 1987 | Eat the Rich | Jeremy | |
| 1988 | The Fruit Machine | Annabelle | |
| 1989 | Henry V | Falstaff | |
| 1989 | Bert Rigby, You're a Fool | Sid Trample | |
| 1989 | Let It Ride | Ticket Seller | |
| 1989 | Danny, the Champion of the World | Victor Hazell | |
| 1989 | Slipstream | Montclaire | |
| 1990 | Midnight Breaks | Hudge | |
| 1990 | Nuns on the Run | Charlie McManus / Sister Inviolata | |
| 1990 | Perfectly Normal | Alonzo Turner | |
| 1991 | The Pope Must Die | The Pope | |
| 1991 | Triple Bogey on a Par Five Hole | Steffano Baccardi | |
| 1992 | Oh, What a Night | Todd | |
| 1993 | Boswell & Johnson's Tour of the Western Isles | Samuel Johnson | |
| 1993 | The Adventures of Huck Finn | Duke | |
| 1995 | GoldenEye | Valentin Dmitrovich Zukovsky | |
| 1997 | The Ebb-Tide | Captain Chisholm | |
| 1997 | Buddy | Bill Lintz | |
| 1998 | Frogs for Snakes | Al Santana | |
| 1998 | Montana | The Boss | |
| 1999 | The World Is Not Enough | Valentin Dmitrovich Zukovsky | |
| 1999 | Message in a Bottle | Charlie Toschi | |
| 2001 | On the Nose | Delaney | |
| 2001 | From Hell | Sergeant Peter Godley | |
| 2001 | Harry Potter and the Philosopher's Stone | Rubeus Hagrid | |
| 2002 | Harry Potter and the Chamber of Secrets | Rubeus Hagrid | |
| 2004 | Harry Potter and the Prisoner of Azkaban | Rubeus Hagrid | |
| 2004 | Ocean's Twelve | Ian Nicholas McNally / Matsui | |
| 2004 | Van Helsing: The London Assignment | Mr. Hyde | Voice role |
| 2004 | Van Helsing | Mr. Hyde | Voice role |
| 2005 | Harry Potter and the Goblet of Fire | Rubeus Hagrid | |
| 2006 | Stormbreaker | The Prime Minister | |
| 2006 | Provoked | Lord Edward Foster | |
| 2007 | Harry Potter and the Order of the Phoenix | Rubeus Hagrid | |
| 2008 | The Tale of Despereaux | Gregory | Voice role |
| 2008 | The Brothers Bloom | The Curator | |
| 2009 | Gooby | Gooby | Voice role |
| 2009 | Harry Potter and the Half-Blood Prince | Rubeus Hagrid | |
| 2010 | Harry Potter and the Deathly Hallows – Part 1 | Rubeus Hagrid | |
| 2011 | Harry Potter and the Deathly Hallows – Part 2 | Rubeus Hagrid | |
| 2012 | Brave | Lord Dingwall | Voice role |
| 2012 | Great Expectations | Mr Jaggers | |
| 2014 | Effie Gray | Doctor | Final film role |

=== Television ===
| Year | Title | Role | Notes |
|---|---|---|---|
| 1979 | Play for Today | Jimmie | Episode: "Waterloo Sunset" |
| 1980 | The Lost Tribe | Border Post Guard | Episode: "Keep Us Alive" |
| 1981 | Metal Mickey | Jason | Episode: "Mickey the Demon Barber" |
| 1981 | Keep It in the Family | Mr Conway | "A Matter of Principle" |
| 1982 | Sin on Saturday | Himself | 2 episodes: "Lust", "Covetousness" |
| 1982 | The Young Ones | Slobber | Season 1, episode 2: "Oil" |
| 1982–2012 | The Comic Strip Presents... | Various roles | Series 1–5; Special: "Five Go Mad in Dorset"; Director & co-writer – Episode: "Jealousy" (1993) |
| 1983 | Are You Being Served? | C.B. Voice | Voice; Episode: "Calling All Customers" |
| 1983 | Alfresco | Various roles | 13 episodes |
| 1984 | A Kick Up the Eighties | Various roles | Replaced Richard Stilgoe. Writer credits. |
| 1984 | Laugh??? I Nearly Paid My Licence Fee | Various roles | Writer credits. |
| 1984 | The Young Ones | Dr Carlisle / Captain Blood | Series 2, episode 1: "Bambi" & episode 4: "Time" |
| 1987 | Blackadder the Third | Samuel Johnson | Episode 2: "Ink and Incapability" |
| 1987 | Tutti Frutti | Danny McGlone | 6 episodes |
| 1988 | Friday Night Live | Various roles "Uncle Don Corleone" | Show 6 |
| 1988 | Blackadder's Christmas Carol | The Spirit of Christmas | Christmas special |
| 1989 | The Robbie Coltrane Special | Himself | LWT comedy special; co-writer |
| 1991 | Screen One | Psychiatrist Liam Kane | Episode: "Alive and Kicking" |
| 1992 | The Bogie Man | Francis Forbes Clunie | TV film |
| 1993 | The Legend of Lochnagar | The old man | Television film, voice role |
| 1993 | Coltrane in a Cadillac | Himself | 4-part documentary |
| 1993–2006 | Cracker | Dr. Eddie 'Fitz' Fitzgerald | 25 episodes |
| 1997 | Coltrane's Planes and Automobiles | Himself | 6-part documentary |
| 1998 | The Ebb-Tide | Capt. Chisholm | TV film |
| 1999 | Alice in Wonderland | Ned Tweedledum | Television movie |
| 2003 | The Planman | Jack Lennox QC | |
| 2004 | Pride | James | Television film, voice |
| 2004 | Frasier | Michael Moon | Episode: "Goodnight, Seattle" |
| 2005 | Still Game | Davie | Series 4, episode 3: "Dial-A-Bus" |
| 2006 | Cracker: Nine Eleven | Dr Eddie 'Fitz' Fitzgerald | Television film |
| 2007 | Robbie Coltrane – B Road Britain | Himself | TV documentary |
| 2009 | Murderland | D.I. Douglas Hain | 3-part TV drama |
| 2009 | The Gruffalo | Gruffalo | Short film; voice role |
| 2011 | The Gruffalo's Child | Gruffalo | Short film; voice role |
| 2011 | Lead Balloon | Donald | Series 4, episode 4: "Off"; Series 4, episode 5: "Blade" |
| 2011 | 50 Greatest Harry Potter Moments | Himself | Narrator |
| 2013 | The Many Faces of Robbie Coltrane | Himself | TV documentary |
| 2013 | Yes, Prime Minister | Rory McAllister | |
| 2016 | National Treasure | Paul Finchley | 4-part TV drama |
| 2016–2018 | Robbie Coltrane's Critical Evidence | Host | True crime, non-fiction At least two seasons have been released as DVD sets by BeyondHE. |
| 2020 | Urban Myths | Orson Welles | 1 episode |
| 2022 | Harry Potter 20th Anniversary: Return to Hogwarts | Himself | HBO Max special, final television appearance |

=== Video games ===
| Year | Title | Role | Notes |
|---|---|---|---|
| 2016 | Lego Dimensions | Rubeus Hagrid | |

=== Theatre ===
| Year | Title | Role | Notes |
|---|---|---|---|
| 1978 | The Slab Boys | Jack Hogg | Traverse Theatre, Edinburgh |
| 1980 | Threads | Performer | Hampstead Theatre, London |

=== Music video ===
| Year | Title | Role | Notes |
|---|---|---|---|
| 2011 | Deeper Understanding | Computer Junkie | from Kate Bush album Director's Cut |

=== Theme park attractions ===
| Year | Title | Role | Notes |
|---|---|---|---|
| 2010 | Harry Potter and the Forbidden Journey | Rubeus Hagrid | |
| 2010 | Flight of the Hippogriff | Rubeus Hagrid | Voice role |
| 2014 | Hogwarts Express | Rubeus Hagrid | Cameo appearance |
| 2019 | Hagrid's Magical Creatures Motorbike Adventure | Rubeus Hagrid | Final performance as Hagrid before his death in 2022 |

== Awards, honours and legacy ==
| Year | Award | Category | Nominated work | Result | Ref |
|---|---|---|---|---|---|
| 1988 | British Academy Television Award | Best Actor | Tutti Frutti | Nominated | |
| 1994 | British Academy Television Award | Best Actor | Cracker | Won | |
| 1995 | British Academy Television Award | Best Actor | Cracker | Won | |
| 1996 | British Academy Television Award | Best Actor | Cracker | Won | |
| 1993 | Royal Television Society Award | Performance Award – Male | Cracker | Won | |
| 1995 | Broadcasting Press Guild Award | Best Actor | Cracker | Won | |
| 2002 | British Academy Film Award | Best Actor in a Supporting Role | Harry Potter and the Philosopher's Stone | Nominated | |
| 2001 | Saturn Award | Best Supporting Actor | Harry Potter and the Philosopher's Stone | Nominated | |
| 2017 | British Academy Television Award | Best Actor | National Treasure | Nominated | |
| 2017 | Broadcasting Press Guild Award | Best Actor | National Treasure | Won | |
| 2017 | Royal Television Society Award | Best Actor – Male | National Treasure | Won | |
| 2017 | Monte-Carlo Television Festival | Long Fiction Program. Outstanding Actor | National Treasure | Won | |

Honorary awards

- Coltrane won the Evening Standard British Film Award – Peter Sellers Award for Comedy 1990.
- He was awarded the OBE (Officer of the Order of the British Empire) in the 2006 New Year Honours for his services to drama.
- In 2011, he was honoured for his "Outstanding Contribution to Film" at the British Academy Scotland Awards ("BAFTA Scotland Awards").

=== Legacy ===
On 26 December 2022, BBC Four broadcast the tribute programme Robbie Coltrane at the BBC narrated by friend and fellow actor Celia Imrie. This was followed by the documentary Richard Wilson Remembers... Tutti Frutti and the first two episodes of Tutti Frutti. The remaining four episodes were broadcast again over the subsequent two nights.

== Publications ==
- Coltrane, Robbie; Stuart, Graham (May 1993). Coltrane in a Cadillac. HarperCollins. ISBN 978-1-85702-120-2.
- Coltrane, Robbie (October 1997). Coltrane's Planes & Automobiles. Simon & Schuster. ISBN 978-0-684-81957-0.
- Coltrane, Robbie (June 2008). Robbie Coltrane's B-Road Britain. Transworld. ISBN 978-0-593-05996-8.

== See also ==
- List of Scottish actors
