= Laugh??? I Nearly Paid My Licence Fee =

British television show

- Genre: Sketch show
- Developed by: BBC Scotland
- Written by: Chris Morrison; Archie O'Niell; Ian Pattison; Robbie Coltrane
- Directed by: Colin Gilbert
- Starring: Robbie Coltrane; John Sessions; Ron Bain; Louise Gold
- Country of origin: United Kingdom
- Original language: English
- No. of series: 1
- No. of episodes: 6

Production
- Running time: 25 minutes

Original release
- Network: BBC2
- Release: 29 October – 3 December 1984

Laugh??? I Nearly Paid My Licence Fee is a 1984 BBC 2 sketch show starring Robbie Coltrane, John Sessions, Ron Bain and Louise Gold. The programme, notable for featuring the television debut of Elaine C. Smith, was an experiment with a new format following the success of A Kick Up the Eighties, running for a single series of six episodes.

The series was later repeated by British satellite channel UK Gold during 1995.
