= Week Ending =

Satirical British comedy radio programme

- Genre: Satirical sketch comedy
- Running time: 25 mins
- Country of origin: United Kingdom
- Language: English
- Home station: BBC Radio 4
- Created by: Simon Brett; David Hatch
- Original release: 4 April 1970 – 3 April 1998
- No. of episodes: 1,132
- Opening theme: "Smokey Joe"; "Party Fears Two" by The Associates

Week Ending is a satirical radio current affairs sketch show broadcast on BBC Radio 4 between 1970 and 1998. It was devised by writer-producers Simon Brett and David Hatch and was originally hosted by Nationwide presenter Michael Barratt.

The show's title was always announced as "Week Ending..." followed by the broadcast date, although the ellipsis was dropped from its billed title in Radio Times during the mid-1970s. The show was written and recorded shortly before the first broadcast (which was usually on a Friday evening) and satirised events of the week. Each show concluded with "And now here is Next Week's News", although this collection of one-liners was abandoned in the early 1990s. Short gags were thereafter scattered throughout the show. Relatively few editions survive in the BBC archives, and they are rarely repeated.

== Contributors and cast ==
Week Ending was considered a "training ground" for a large number of comedy writers, performers and producers. Many young BBC production recruits were given the programme for a month or so in order to get to grips with scripted comedy and working with performers. The programme also accepted material by post, fax and e-mail. This open door policy, which it shared with Radio 2's long-running News Huddlines, made it a point of entry for writers who went on to have successful careers in British radio and television.

Script contributors included Mel Giedroyc, Sue Perkins, Andy Hamilton, Mark Burton, John O'Farrell, Guy Jenkin, Andy Riley, Kevin Cecil, Richard Herring, D. A. (Debbie) Barham, Peter Baynham, Julian Dutton, Harry Hill, Al Murray, Ben Moor, Tony Lee, Rich Johnston, David Baddiel, Rob Newman, Graeme Sutherland, Kim Morrissey, Barry Pilton, Paddy Murray, Ivan Shakespeare, Barry Atkins, Stewart Lee, Colin Bostock-Smith and Martin Curtis.

Regular performers during the run included David Jason, Bill Wallis, Nigel Rees, David Tate, Jon Glover, Sheila Steafel, Alison Steadman, Tracey Ullman, Toby Longworth, Chris Emmett and Sally Grace.

For several months during 1997, Week Ending carried a musical number written by Gerard Foster and performed by Richie Webb. This broke a lengthy hiatus for musical content, which until 1982 had involved Bill McGuffie, David Firman and Steve Brown.

Amongst the producers were John Lloyd, Douglas Adams, David Tyler, Jimmy Mulville, Harry Thompson, Gareth Edwards, Armando Iannucci, Jon Magnusson, Geoffrey Perkins, Griff Rhys Jones, Sarah Smith and Adam Tandy.

== Broadcast ==
Until 1983, Week Ending was taken off the air during election campaigns. As sensitivities eased, it was allowed to remain on air during the 1987, 1992 and 1997 elections, albeit with rigid levels of political balance.

During the 1980s and 1990s, the BBC World Service broadcast a highlights programme once a month. This would include sketches from Week Ending episodes transmitted during the previous four weeks, more usually the items that could easily be understood by an international audience. This was broadcast by the World Service, usually on the last Friday of the month, under the title of "Two Cheers for [month] ". For many years, there was also an annual highlights show, akin to Year Ending, called "Two Cheers for 1982" (etc.).

From the early 1980s, the theme tune was a loop of the instrumental section of The Associates' 1982 hit "Party Fears Two", which replaced the original 'whistled' flute piece, "Smokey Joe". Over the years, the tune changed a number of times – totalling four pieces, the third debuting in 1993 and the fourth in 1997 – but the final edition in 1998 finished with the original (each of the others having been heard briefly in sketches set in earlier decades).

== Tie-ins ==
Series writers Ian Brown and James Hendrie wrote a book based on the series in 1985, The Cabinet Leaks. Ten Years With Maggie, a cassette compilation of sketches written during Thatcher's tenure as prime minister, emerged in 1989 and was reissued on CD as Week Ending with Maggie in April 2009.
