= Tony Roper (actor) =

Scottish actor (born 1941)

- Born: Denis Daniel Michael Roper; 19 August 1941 (age 85); Glasgow, Scotland
- Years active: 1971–present
- Spouse: Isobel

Denis Daniel Michael "Tony" Roper (born 19 August 1941) is a Scottish actor, comedian, playwright and writer.

== Career ==
In his early life he worked as a miner in Fife (where there were family connections), and as a van boy in a Glasgow bakery. His first major starring role was in Scotch and Wry. He wrote the comedy-drama The Steamie in 1987, for which he won a BAFTA. He achieved even greater fame in Naked Video and in the spin-off series Rab C. Nesbitt, in which he played Rab's partner-in-crime, Jamesie Cotter. He also starred in the short-lived 1999 sitcom All Along the Watchtower. Tony also had a small part as the postman in the longer version of the 1973 cult film, The Wicker Man.

In theatre, he played Tom Weals in Miles Tredinnick's farce It's Now or Never! at the Queen's Theatre, Hornchurch in 1994. He also starred in other stage plays such as Willie Rough by Bill Bryden, "The Red Runner" by Billy Connolly, and various other plays by Alyn Aykbourn, Shaw and Shakespeare.

In the 1980s, he co-founded the charity football team Dukla Pumpherston. Other football-related work included regular appearances on the television and stage versions of the satirical series Only an Excuse? during the 1990s alongside Jonathan Watson.

Roper has also written Paddies, a conceptual sequel to The Steamie set in Glasgow's "Paddies Market" (Paddy's Market), and two novels based on Rikki Fulton's character Rev. I. M. Jolly. In 2004-2005 he co-wrote and starred as Rikki Fulton in Rikki and Me, a play about the comedy actor Rikki Fulton, which is available on DVD, and appeared as Merv in the 2005 Scottish film, On a Clear Day.

=== Other activities ===
Roper is a lifelong supporter of Celtic F.C. He presented the club's VHS/DVD The Treble in celebration of Celtic's 2000–01 treble-winning season, and Hoops we did it again in 2001–2002. In 2008, he wrote and directed the hit play The Celts in Seville which played at the Pavilion Theatre (Glasgow) in 2008 and 2014.

== Personal life ==
Roper and his wife Isobel live in Glasgow.

He was awarded an honorary degree by Abertay University in 2008.

In April 2013, Roper received treatment for prostate cancer. He was given the all-clear.

His autobiography I'll No Tell You Again was published in 2014. The foreword was written by his friend, Billy Connolly.

== Theatre ==
Year	Title	Role	Company	Director	Notes
1979	The Lass wi' the Muckle Mou	Wattie	Brunton Theatre, Musselburgh	Sandy Neilson	play by Alexander Reid
1982	Ane Satire of the Thrie Estaites	Solace	Scottish Theatre Company	Tom Fleming	play by Sir David Lyndsay, adapted by Robert Kemp

== Filmography ==
Film
Year	Title	Role	Notes
1973	The Wicker Man	Postman	
2005	On a Clear Day	Merv the Perv	

Television
Date	Title	Role	Notes
2 February 1988	The Play on One	Bruce	Episode: "Normal Service"
1 April 1989	The Play on One	Gordon	Episode: "Biting the Hands"
