= Helen Lederer =

British comedian (born 1954)

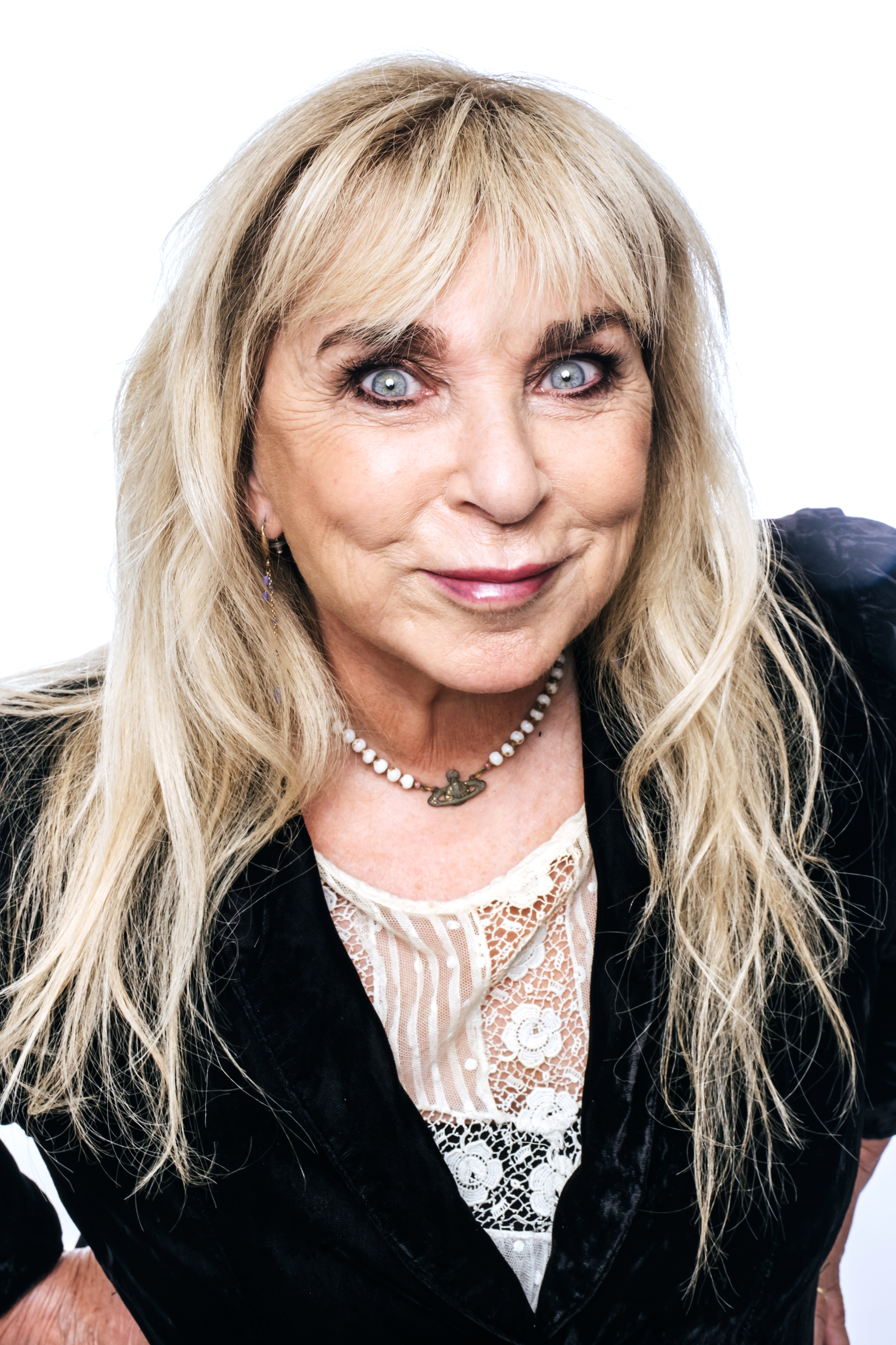
- Lederer in 2023
- Born: 24 September 1954 (age 71); Carmarthen, Wales
- Education: Royal Central School of Speech and Drama
- Occupations: Comedian; writer; actress
- Spouses: Roger Alton (m. 1989; div. 1991) Chris Browne (m. 1999)
- Children: 1
- Website: helenlederer.co.uk

Helen Margaret Lederer (born 24 September 1954) is a British comedian, writer and actress who emerged as part of the alternative comedy boom at the beginning of the 1980s. Among her television credits are the BBC2 sketch series Naked Video and BBC One's Absolutely Fabulous, in which she played the role of Catriona.

In 2015, her comedy novel Losing It was published by Pan Macmillan. It was shortlisted for the Bollinger Everyman Wodehouse Prize and the Edinburgh Book Festival First Book Award.

== Early life ==
Helen Lederer was born on 24 September 1954 in Carmarthen, Wales, to an English mother and Czech-Jewish father. Her father was born in 1926 in Teplice, Czechoslovakia, and many of her relatives did not survive the Holocaust. Lederer's paternal grandfather, Arnost, worked as a clandestine listener to German prisoners of war at Trent Park in North London during World War II.

She was raised in Eltham, southeast London, and was educated at Blackheath High School (then a direct grant grammar school) and the Central School of Speech and Drama. She also studied at the University of Hertfordshire.

She has a BA degree in applied social science and has received honorary doctorates from Middlesex University and Hertfordshire University.

== Career ==
Lederer was the only woman to write and perform in BBC Radio 4's In One Ear. Produced by Jamie Rix with Clive Mantle and Nick Wilton, it won the Sony Award for best comedy and progressed to the TV version called Hello Mum.

Lederer established a stand-up act at the Comedy Store in London and then won minor parts in episodes of The Young Ones, which had been written by her Comedy Store contemporaries Ben Elton and Rik Mayall. She was linked with this scene for the rest of the 1980s, with a supporting role as housemaid Flossie in Happy Families and numerous appearances in related shows and live performances.

Lederer broke from the Comedy Store wing of the alternative scene in 1986 to take part in the BBC2 sketch show Naked Video, which had originated without Lederer on the radio in Scotland. Lederer played various roles, including that of a newsreader linking spoof headlines into clips which acted as punchlines, and a drunk Sloane who performed a monologue in each episode from a wine bar. In the 1980s, she reprised her Sloane role in a series of television adverts for Warninks Advocaat, with voice-overs by Stephen Fry.

In the 1990s, Lederer was recruited by her old contemporaries Mayall and Ade Edmondson to play supporting roles in two episodes of their sitcom Bottom, including a part as a fallen millionairess on the make. Simultaneously, she played Catriona in Absolutely Fabulous, joining forces again with Jennifer Saunders. She had previously worked with Saunders and her comedy partner Dawn French in their sketch show French and Saunders, as well as Happy Families and the ITV sitcom Girls on Top. She also guest-acted in the Gregor Fisher sitcom The Baldy Man.

She was one of the first female stand-up comedians to feature on ITV's Saturday Night Live with her own stand up set. She then took part in The Vagina Monologues on the West End stage. Following The House of Blue Leaves at the Lilian Baylis Theatre with the late Denis Quilley and Having a Ball by Alan Bleasdale at the Comedy Theatre, she then appeared in The Killing of Sister George at the Arts Theatres and Calendar Girls with Kelly Brook at the Wyndham's Theatre.

As a presenter, Lederer has hosted and voiced lifestyle, religious and children's programmes. She has appeared on numerous radio panel games including Quote... Unquote, The News Quiz and Just a Minute and written columns for newspapers and magazines. She wrote and starred in radio shows Life with Lederer and All Change at BBC Radio 4. In December 2009, Lederer appeared on Eggheads and went head-to-head against Kevin Ashman.

Lederer was one of eight celebrities who spent a week learning the Welsh language in an eco-friendly campsite in Pembrokeshire for the S4C television series cariad@iaith:love4language shown in July 2011. She appeared in the 2011 British live-action 3D family comedy film Horrid Henry: The Movie, as the title character's aunt Rich Aunt Ruby.

In 2013 Lederer played Miss Bowline-Hitch in the children's television series Old Jack's Boat on the CBeebies channel. This role was alongside veteran actor Bernard Cribbins, playing the role of Jack, and supporting actors Freema Agyeman and Janine Duvitski.

In January 2013, she was a contestant on ITV celebrity diving show Splash!, but was eliminated in the first round. In October 2013, she played the midwife Mariam in Hollyoaks who was responsible for a baby-swap scandal, a role she reprised in 2015 before being killed off by the "Gloved Hand Killer".

In February 2015, Lederer appeared, as grieving widow Safia, in the BBC soap opera series Doctors. She has also appeared on Celebrity MasterChef, Loose Women and Countdown.

In 2017 she competed in Celebrity Big Brother 20, eventually becoming the 7th housemate to be evicted. In 2018, the BBC launched the comedy podcast series Knock Knock, in which she talks with guest comedians from across the UK.

Lederer appears in the 2018 short film To Trend on Twitter in aid of young people with cancer charity CLIC Sargent with fellow comedians Reece Shearsmith, Steve Pemberton, David Baddiel and actor Jason Flemyng.

In 2019 she hosted the "Women in Comedy" panel at Wilderness Festival.

On 11 April 2024, Lederer released her memoir titled Not That I'm Bitter: A Truly, Madly, Funny Memoir.

In 2025 she was featured in the BBC series Pilgrimage, following a revived medieval route, from Austria to the Einsiedeln Abbey, in Switzerland.

In June 2025, Lederer joined the cast in the London West End stage adaptation of Fawlty Towers as the character Mrs Richards.

In 2026 Lederer was the guest on the BBC Radio 4 programme Great Lives, talking about the life of the American comedian Joan Rivers.

== Comedy Women in Print award ==
In 2018, Lederer launched a new literary prize for comic fiction written by women. The 2019 published winner of the CWIP award was The Exact Opposite of Okay by Laura Steven. Kirsty Eyre was the inaugural winner of the unpublished prize with her comic novel, Cow Girl, which was published in 2020. The 2020 awards added a humorous graphic novel prize.

The award was created because of dissatisfaction with the Bollinger Everyman Wodehouse Prize, which was not awarded in 2018 and had up to that point only been won by a woman three times.

== Personal life ==
Lederer has married twice and has a daughter with her first husband, the journalist and former editor of The Observer, Roger Alton. Her second husband is Chris Browne, a GP.

Lederer is an ambassador for the King's Trust, the Eve Appeal Gynaecological Cancer Charity and the cancer charity GO Girls.

== Television and film appearances ==
| Year | Title | Role(s) | Notes |
|---|---|---|---|
| 1984 | The Young Ones | Gwendolyn; Bank Teller | 2 episodes ("Time", "Summer Holiday") |
| 1984 | Little Armadillos | Various | 7 episodes |
| 1985 | Happy Families | Flossie | 5 episodes |
| 1985–1986 | Girls on Top | Debbie, Felicity | 3 episodes |
| 1986–1991 | Naked Video | Argumentative Wife | Appears in 12 episodes, also writer of 2 epiosdes |
| 1987 | Filthy Rich & Catflap | Doctor | 1 episode ("Dead Milkmen") |
| 1987 | Hello Mum | Herself | Co-host and writer |
| 1988–1998 | French and Saunders | Baby Sue; Make-up Artist | 2 episodes ("Episodes 2.3", "The Making of Titanic") |
| 1989 | The New Statesman | Radio presenter | 1 episode ("The Haltemprice Bunker") |
| 1991–1992 | Bottom | Nurse; Lady Natasha | 2 episodes ("Apocalypse", "Digger") |
| 1992–2012 | Absolutely Fabulous | Catriona | 13 episodes |
| 1992, 2011 | Casualty | Maria Harrap; Hillary Oppe | 2 episodes ("Profit and Loss", "Starting Over") |
| 1992 | Virtual Murder | Meriel Connors | 1 episode ("Meltdown to Murder") |
| 1992 | Harry Enfield's Television Programme | Prostitute | 1 episode |
| 1993 | One Foot in the Grave | Andrea Temple | 1 episode ("Descent Into Maelstrom") |
| 1996 | Murder Most Horrid | Yvonne Quail | 1 episode ("Dying Live") |
| 2000 | Sooty Heights | Mrs Frumpton | 1 episode ("Too Many Cooks") |
| 2002 | Mr. Bean: The Animated Series | Additional voices | 2 episodes |
| 2004 | Mile High | Julia | 1 episode ("Season 2, Episode 11") |
| 2004 | Fat Slags | Hysterical Woman | Film |
| 2006 | Heartbeat | Kath Harrison | 1 episode ("The Dying of the Light") |
| 2008 | Love Soup | Maxine | 1 episode ("Human Error") |
| 2008 | Genie in the House | Adiva | 1 episode ("Genie Hotline") |
| 2009 | Agatha Christie's Marple | Marjorie Attfield | 1 episode ("Why Didn't They Ask Evans?") |
| 2009 | Mist: Sheepdog Tales | Lord Roberta; Colleen Cow (voice only) | 4 episodes |
| 2009 | Banky's Coming to Dinner | Herself | |
| 2010 | The Kid | Mrs Saunders | |
| 2010 | Hotel Trubble | Marlene | 1 episode ("Strictly Come Prancing") |
| 2010 | Little Howard's Big Question | Big's Howard's Mum | 2 episodes |
| 2011 | Horrid Henry: The Movie | Rich Aunt Ruby | |
| 2012 | Iconicles | Miss Moo | Recurring role |
| 2012–2014 | Big Brother's Bit on the Side | Herself | 10 episodes |
| 2013–2015 | Hollyoaks | Mariam Andrews | 8 episodes |
| 2013–2014 | Old Jack's Boat | Miss Bowline-Hitch | |
| 2015, 2021 | Doctors | Safia Jobson; Maisie Oliver | 2 episodes ("The Rat", "Wonderland") |
| 2016 | Sarah Chong Is Going to Kill Herself | HR Pam | |
| 2016 | Gridiron UK | Derek's Mum | |
| 2016 | Absolutely Fabulous: The Movie | Catriona | |
| 2017 | Celebrity Big Brother | Herself | |
| 2018 | Pointless Celebrities | Herself | |
| 2018 | The Ballad of a Haunted Man | Ruth | |
| 2018 | To Trend on Twitter | Belinda | |
| 2018 | Some Sketches in a Shed | Tooth Fairy | 1 episode ("Timmy Loves Easter Egg Hunting") |
| 2020 | The Schnoz | Sandra | |
| 2023 | Midsomer Murders | Ginny Kilcannon | 1 episode ("A Climate of Death") |
| 2023 | A Packet of Cheese and Onion Bureaucracy | Voice of the Universe | Voice |
| 2024 | Coronation Street | Elspeth | 1 episode |
| 2024 | Not That I'm Bitter | Helen, Claudia | TV mini-series, also co-writer |
| 2025 | Pilgrimage | Believer in God | "The Road through the Alps" |
