= Jonathan Watson =

Scottish actor

- Watson during Two Doors Down Live, October 2026
- Born: 23 November 1957 (age 68); Glasgow, Scotland
- Education: Royal Conservatoire of Scotland
- Occupations: Actor, writer
- Years active: 1979–present
- Known for: City Lights (1984–1991); Naked Video (1986–1991); Only an Excuse? (1993–2020); Bob Servant (2013–2015); Two Doors Down (2013–present)

Jonathan Watson (born 23 November 1957) is a Scottish actor best known for his comedy sketch show Only an Excuse?, which parodied people and events from the world of Scottish football, as well as roles in the BBC comedies Bob Servant Independent in which he appears with Brian Cox, and as Colin in the acclaimed Two Doors Down (2013–present). In the 1980s he was also a regular cast member of the Scottish sitcom City Lights and the sketch show Naked Video.

== Early life and education ==
Watson was born in Glasgow and was educated at Hillhead Primary and Hillhead High School. He trained at the Royal Scottish Academy of Music and Drama and graduated in 1979. He joined the TAG Theatre Company then followed this with a season with the 7:84 company.

== Career ==
=== Television and film ===
He had a part in Bill Forsyth's 1983 film Local Hero, and moved to London in 1986 before returning to Scotland two years later. Watson appeared in all five seasons of Naked Video that were broadcast on BBC Scotland between 1986 and 1991, He was also in City Lights, Rab C. Nesbitt and Only an Excuse?. Watson's appeared as Frank (Francis) the campaign manager of local cheeseburger magnate in the cult BBC Four Neil Forsyth comedy Bob Servant Independent. This show was first broadcast in the UK in January 2013, and ran for two series. In 2013, Watson appeared in Rob Drummond's Quiz Show at the Traverse Theatre in Edinburgh. In 2014 he played Archie in John Byrne's adaptation of Chekhov's The Three Sisters for The Tron, Glasgow. He was also in The National Theatre of Scotland's production of Yer Granny, which toured Scotland & Northern Ireland.

He appeared in the horror film Let Us Prey which was released in 2015. Early television appearances included minor parts in The Bill and Casualty. In Bob Servant which sees him playing opposite Brian Cox, as Bob's trusty sidekick - Frank. He was acted as Clice Bagshawe in Fried. Following the success of a one-hour pilot, a six-part comedy series Two Doors Down was made which screened on BBC2 beginning in March 2016.

From December 2019 to January 2020, Watson played King Hector in the pantomime Jack and the Beanstalk at the King's Theatre, Glasgow In 2021 he appeared in Doctor Who - Flux as Sontarans 'Commander Riskaw' and 'Skaak'.

=== Comedy impressions ===
Watson's Wind Up was a political satire show that was aired on BBC Radio Scotland. The show was recorded on Fridays at the Glasgow Film Theatre.

== Personal life ==
Watson is a supporter of Rangers F.C.

== Theatre ==
Year	Title	Role	Company	Director |	Notes
2014	Three Sisters	Archie	Tron Theatre, Glasgow	Andy Arnold	adaptation by John Byrne
