= Andy Gray (actor) =

Scottish actor and writer (1959–2021)

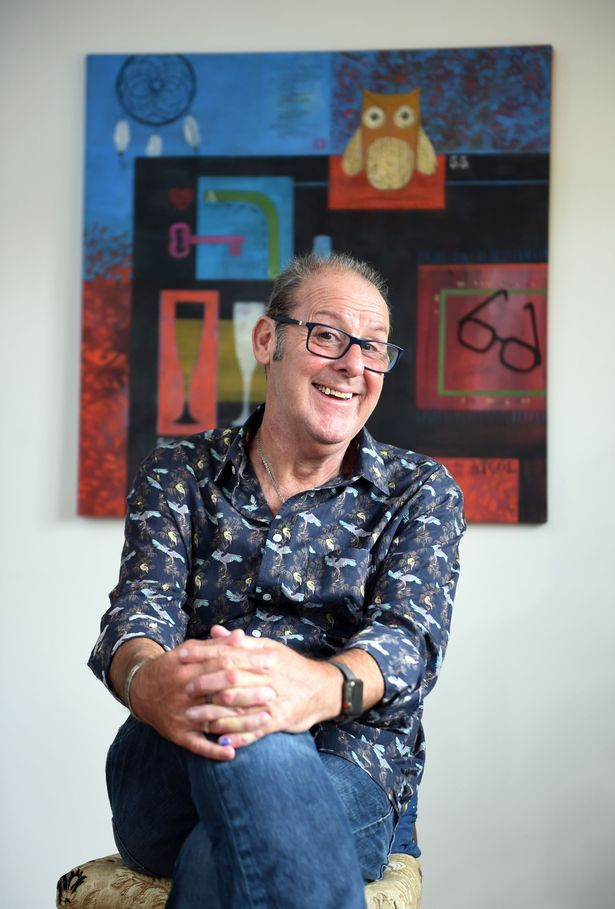
- Born: 13 September 1959; Perth, Scotland
- Died: 18 January 2021 (aged 61); Dundee, Scotland
- Occupations: Theatre and television actor, comedian

Andy Gray (13 September 1959 – 18 January 2021) was a Scottish actor and writer from Perth.

He appeared on stage and TV, including starring roles in the BBC series Naked Video, City Lights, and River City.

== Education ==
He trained at the Drama School of Edinburgh's Queen Margaret University College from 1976 to 1979.

== Career ==
Gray starred in the BBC Radio Scotland sketch show Naked Radio, and its later television counterpart Naked Video. He then became well known as the appropriately named "Chancer", best friend and source of problems to Willie Melvin (Gerard Kelly) in the 1987 sitcom City Lights. He was well known for Christmas pantomimes, usually co-writing the script and often alongside other former City Lights cast members. He appeared opposite Kelly in a touring production of The Odd Couple. He took the starring role in a Channel 4 proposed comedy pilot show Miles is Better where he played a very enthusiastic burglar alarm salesman (Miles).

Gray worked extensively in theatre and television since 1979 and was described as "a stalwart of Scottish Theatre". Gray appeared in the 2013 Edinburgh Fringe with panto colleague Grant Stott in Philip Meeks's play Kiss Me Honey Honey, which won a Fringe First. The show returned at the 2014 Fringe. In the feature film Time Teens, he portrayed a villain (Black Ruthven) with writer/actor Ian Grieve directed by Ryan Dewar. He continued in his darker comedy as William Donaldson in Ian Pattison's Willie and Sebastian at the 2015 Edinburgh Fringe when he won the coveted Stage Award for Acting Excellence for his performance.

Gray joined his pantomime co-stars, Allan Stewart and Grant Stott in Canned Laughter, a tour about a 1970s showbiz trio based on Stewart's career. His final Fringe performances were in Philip Differ's 'Double Feature' (2017 and 2018 tour) and Ruaraidh Murray's The Junkies (which played only one performance due to Gray's cancer diagnosis). He appeared in Jason Connery's Scottish BAFTA award-winning 2016 film Tommy's Honour. From 2016 until 2018, he played Pete Galloway in Scottish soap opera River City.

Other theatre performances include: Dario Fo's Trumpets and Raspberries (1985) with Elaine C. Smith and Alan Cumming; Werewolf (1999); Guys and Dolls (2001) at Lyceum, Edinburgh; The Woman Who Cooked her Husband (2004); A Limited Run (2005); Stones in His Pockets (2005); The Rise and Fall of Little Voice (2008); and Irma Vep (2009) at Perth Theatre with Steven McNicoll.

His pantomime catch phrase was, "I'm no very well".

== Personal life ==
In August 2018, Gray, who was beginning a run of the play Junkies at the Edinburgh Festival Fringe, felt unwell and withdrew from the show, and from the filming of River City that was to follow. He was diagnosed with myelodysplastic syndromes. Gray was treated with chemotherapy and a bone marrow transplant from one of his sisters. He returned to work in 2019, saying he was "feeling great now".

Gray contracted COVID-19 during the COVID-19 pandemic in December 2020. He died in hospital intensive care on 18 January 2021, aged 61, following complications caused by COVID-19.
