= Gerard Kelly =

Scottish actor (1959–2010)

- Kelly in 2010
- Born: Paul Kelly; 27 May 1959; Glasgow, Scotland
- Died: 28 October 2010 (aged 51); Isleworth, England
- Other name: Gerry Kelly
- Occupation: Actor
- Years active: 1971–2010

Gerard Kelly (born Paul Kelly; 27 May 1959 – 28 October 2010) was a Scottish actor who appeared in many comedies, including City Lights, Rab C Nesbitt, Scotch and Wry and Extras. He had more serious roles as well, including PC David Gallagher in Juliet Bravo (1981), the villainous Jimmy in EastEnders (1994) and the villainous Callum Finnegan in Brookside (1997–2000).

== Career ==
From 1984 to 1991, Kelly appeared in the BBC comedy City Lights as the central character Willie Melvin, a bank clerk who dreams of becoming a writer despite having no talent for it.

Kelly had a small part in the film Comic Strip Presents... Mr. Jolly Lives Next Door (1987) and as the music video director in More Bad News (1987). In 1983 Kelly was featured in "Killer", the pilot episode of the long-running Scottish crime drama series Taggart.

In 2005 and 2007, he appeared in the Ricky Gervais and Stephen Merchant comedy series Extras as Ian "Bunny" Bunton.

From 2007-10 he appeared regularly as Father Henderson, a camp Doctor Who-loving priest, in the award-winning BBC Radio 4 comedy Fags, Mags and Bags. In 2011, after Kelly's death, reference was made in the series to Father Henderson's move to another parish and to the fact that the new priest can never replace him.

== Stage performances ==
In 1994 Kelly played Felix Ungar in a Scottish touring production of The Odd Couple, relocated to modern-day Glasgow, alongside Craig Ferguson as Oscar Madison. Kelly reprised the role at the Edinburgh Fringe in 2002, this time opposite his former City Lights co-star Andy Gray.

In 2006 and 2007 Kelly directed and starred in a Scottish play, Rikki and Me, celebrating the life of the comedian Rikki Fulton, in which he played the role of Jack Milroy.

Kelly played the Narrator in The Rocky Horror Show in Edinburgh and Aberdeen from 21 June to 3 July 2010. He was due to revive this performance for one week at the King's Theatre, Glasgow, from 8 to 13 November 2010.

Kelly was well known for his appearances in pantomime at the King's Theatre. He headlined the show for 20 years and was crowned King of Panto. In 2008 he appeared in Cinderella, and the following year (2009/2010) he starred in Aladdin, his last pantomime.

== Death and tribute ==
Kelly was due to star in the 2010/2011 King's Theatre production of Snow White in Glasgow, but died on 28 October 2010 at the West Middlesex University Hospital in Isleworth, after collapsing with a brain aneurysm. His funeral service took place in Glasgow on 12 November.

On New Year's Eve 2010, BBC1 Scotland broadcast an hour-long tribute, Gerard Kelly: A Celebration. In 2013, the King's Theatre, Glasgow unveiled a bronze sculpture in tribute to Kelly.

Kelly never married or had children and left his estate to a friend of 18 years, Terry Kiely.
