= Fuck the Facts discography =

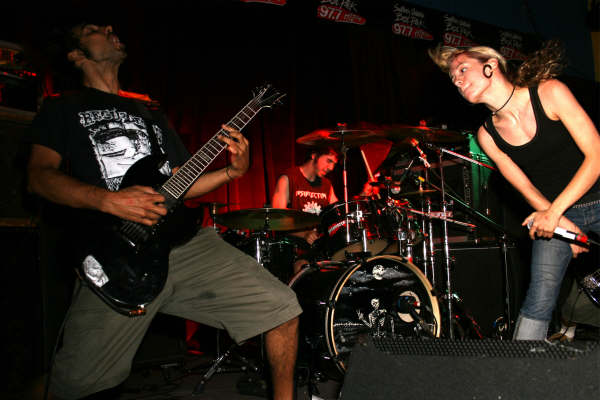
- Fuck the Facts performing live in 2007.
- Studio albums: 11
- Extended plays: 4
- Live albums: 2
- Compilation albums: 2
- Video albums: 1
- Music videos: 5
- Splits: 37
- Promos: 4
- Other appearances: 94

This is a discography of Canadian grindcore band Fuck the Facts.

== Studio albums ==
It is debatable which is the "first" Fuck the Facts full length album. At different times, the band has referred to both the self-titled tape, and the Discoing the Dead CD-R as the first. Their older website states that the self-titled release is the first recording. This discrepancy is most likely because Discoing the Dead was the first Fuck the Facts release (including the splits released at that time) not on cassette. Additionally, Escunta was released almost a year and a half after it was recorded. Its style is more noise oriented (like Vagina Dancer) and it sometimes gets forgotten in discography lists by sites not affiliated with the band.

The list below reflects that all of these releases were considered the equivalent of "full length albums" at the time of their release, and were (and still are) considered official releases by the band.

- 2000: Fuck the Facts (Dedfuk Records)
- 2000: Vagina Dancer (Where Late the Bird Sang)
- 2001: Discoing the Dead (Ghetto Blaster Recordings)
  - Reissued and remastered in 2003 on Black Hole Productions
- 2001: Mullet Fever (Ghetto Blaster Recordings)
  - Reissued and remastered in 2005 on Sonic Deadline Records
- 2002: Escunta (Mandarangan Recordings)
- 2003: Backstabber Etiquette (Grind It! Records)
- 2006: Stigmata High-Five (Relapse Records)
- 2008: Disgorge Mexico (Relapse Records)
- 2011: Die Miserable (Relapse Records)
- 2015: Desire Will Rot (Noise Salvation)
- 2020: Pleine Noirceur (Noise Salvation)

== Live albums ==
- 2003: Live Damage (Smell the Stench)
- 2010: Live in Whitby (Self Released)

== Compilation albums ==
- 2006: Collection of Splits 2002-2004 (Great White North Records)
  - Reissued in 2007 by Galy Records following the demise of Great White North Records
- 2010: St. Jean Baptiste 2010 (Self Released)
- 2011: 10 Fucking Years (Self Released)

== Extended plays ==
- 2001: Four0ninE (Self Released)
- 2005: Legacy of Hopelessness (Ghetto Blaster Recordings / Capital Kill Records)
- 2008: The Wreaking (Self Released)
- 2010: Unnamed EP (Self Released)
- 2011: Misery (Self Released)
- 2013: Amer (Self Released)

== Video albums ==
- 2010: Disgorge Mexico: The DVD

== Music videos ==
- 2005: "Medicated Like a Motherfucker" (created by Topon Das)
- 2005: "Roach"
- 2006: "The Wreaking"
- 2006: "The Sound Of Your Smashed Head" (directed by David Hall)
- 2010: "Wake" (directed by Michael Panduro for Siegfried Productions)

== Splits ==
Early in their career, the main avenue for releasing music was in the form of splits with other bands on small, do-it-yourself labels. This trend is shown by the amount of splits released between 2000 and 2003, compared with the relatively fewer splits released between 2004 and 2008.

- 2000: Split with Cult of the Damned (Grindrot D.I.Y. Productions)
- 2000: Split with Longdreamdead (Abhorrent Creation Tapes)
- 2000: Split with S.M.E.S. (Dedfuk Records / Zas! Autoproduzioni)
- 2000: Primitive Instinct - Split with C.A.D., Diktat, Psychoneurosis and Godless Truth (Symbolic Productions)
- 2001: Split with Inhumate, Bloodshed, Mastectomia and Pulmonary Fibrosis (Unite Bleeding Tapes / Abhorrent Creation Tapes)
- 2001: Split with Mastectomia (Unite Bleeding Tapes)
- 2001: A Japanese Winter - Split with Mourmansk 150 and De Madeliefjes (Symbolic Productions)
- 2001: Split with Ames Sanglantes (Ghetto Blaster Recordings)
- 2001: Split with S.M.E.S. (Impregnate Records)
- 2002: Split with Conure (Ghetto Blaster Recordings)
- 2002: Innocence Is Not Lost, It is Taken - Split with Retch (Vendredi 13 Recordings)
- 2002: Split with P.O.T (Prole Records)
- 2002: Split with Skoda 120 (Beer Is Not Drink Records)
- 2002: Split with Kastrat (Zas! Autoproduzioni / Nuclear Assault Records)
- 2002: The Great One - Split with No Refund and Mermaid In A Manhole (Ghetto Blaster Recordings)
- 2002: Split with Iron Bitchface (Slut Factory Records)
- 2002: Split with Jan AG (Symbolic Productions)
- 2002: Split with Monolith (Melt Sultan Records)
- 2002: Split with Manherringbone (Idol Records)
- 2002: Born in a Riot - Collaborative CD-R with Fever Spoor (Anima Mal Nata Records)
- 2003: Split with Banzai 606 (First Aid Productions)
- 2003: Split with Necrobestiality and Winters In Osaka (My Lai Productions)
- 2003: Split with Hewhocorrupts, Distorcion Social and Obbrobrio (My Lai Productions)
- 2003: Split with Jan AG (N:C:U)
- 2003: She's Hot! - Split with Ultrapodre (War Productions)
- 2003: Split with Sylvester Staline (Anvil of Fury Records)
- 2003: Split with Feeble Minded (Grodhaisn Productions)
- 2004: Overseas Connection - Split with Sergent Slaughter (Meat 5000 Records / Undecent Records)
- 2004: Split with S.M.E.S. (Compilation of the two previous splits together) (Fecal-Matter Discorporated)
- 2004: Split with Cakewet (Human Circus Records)
- 2004: Split with Subcut (Bucho Discos)
- 2005: Split with Narcosis, Midget Parade and Archer (Privileged to Fail Records)
- 2006: Split with Pleasant Valley (Reprocreate Records)
- 2006: Split with Mesrine (Sonic Deadline Records)
- 2007: 4625 - Split with The Crinn, World Downfall and Nesseria (IV Seasons Records)
- 2008: Split with Leng Tch'e (Power It Up Records)
- 2009: Live Split with Mincing Fury and Guttural Clamour of Queer Decay (Burning Dogma Records)

== Promos ==
Most of these releases were given out free at concerts to show fans upcoming music from the band.

- 2002: Bastardizing Canada: Summer 2002 Tour (contains 2 unmastered tracks from the upcoming Backstabber Etiquette, one noise track and one live recording)
- 2002: Winter 2002 Tour EP (contains 4 songs taken from the upcoming split with Sylvester Staline)
- 2003: Promo 2003 (contains 2 tracks taken from the upcoming split CD with Feeble Minded and 2 tracks taken from Backstabber Etiquette)
- 2004: Promo Winter 2004 (contains 2 tracks from the split with Sergeant Slaughter and 2 tracks from the split with Feeble Minded)

== Other appearances ==
Over the years, Fuck the Facts has made appearances on many compilations, zine samplers, tribute albums and other releases. Many of the release dates are unknown, so they are organized alphabetically below. In some cases, very little information is available, and only a compilations existence is known. Information is included where available.

=== Compilation appearances ===
Title	Label	Release date	Format	Tracks included
11e Festival De l'Art Underground 2001	P.S.I.	September 2002	CD	"Whisper Dependency (live)"
Addicted to Chaos #1	ATC Productions	2003	CD	"The Burning Side"
All Systems Grind! Volume Two	Own Control Records	2005	CD	"23-17-41" "Ballet Addict"
Anomalous Silencer #5	Napalmed	2001	CD	"Needle Through Thread"
Anomalous Silencer No. 6	Napalmed	2003	CD	"The Transformation"
As We Storm Canada 7.1	Storm Canada	October 1, 2007	CD-ROM	"The Wrecking"
As We Storm Canada 9.2	Storm Canada	September 1, 2009	CD-ROM	"The Storm"
Be Prepared to Lose Everything	Dedfuk Records	1999	Cassette	"Deal With It"
Birds of Prey	Mandarangan Recordings	2000	2xCD-R	"Crawl The Spine"
The Black Plague Society	Mandarangan Recordings	May 2003	2xCD-R	"Revenge Tactics II"
Buckets of Blood Vol.2	Bloodbucket Productions			"Leper Accountant"
Calling All Reactive Agents Volume #1	Anima Mal Nata		CD-R	"Untitled"
Clinical Extractions Vol. I	Unmatched Brutality	2005	CD	"Ballet Addict"
CM Distro Winter Sampler	CM Distro	2005	CD	"Second Hand Skin"
Crush the World	Mortuary Khage Productions			"Disease in Friction"
Crush Your Canadian Idols	Capital Kill Productions	2006	CD	"Horizon"
The Cyber Killers	Fecal-Matter Discorporated	2005	CD-R	"Whisper Dependency (Video Game Version)"
Death by Noise!!!	Mandarangan Recordings	2001	2xCD-R	"Necrotechno / Nice To Beat You" (one track)
Dirt Cult Mix Tape!! Volume #1	Dirt Cult Records	June 26, 2008	Cassette	"Ventriloquist"
The Disharmony Scene	Slaughter House Productions	June 2003	CD-R	
Dissenting Adults	Manufacturing Dissent	September 2002		
Dreadnaught Compilation	N:C:U	2003	Cassette	"The Burning Side"
Eighteen Years Without Sleep	Mandarangan Recordings	August 2000	Cassette	"Necrotekno" "Nice To Beat You" "Crawl The Spine"
Extreme Rock 'n' Roll Star Vol. 1	Unite Bleeding Tapes	2001	Cassette	"The Meat People" (mislabeled as "Sissy Master")
Extreme Rock 'n' Roll Star Vol. 2	Unite Bleeding Tapes		Cassette	
Fertilization of the Ovum	Bear Walking	2002	CD-R/Cassette	"Whiskey Shot"
Goreland	Black Hole Productions		CD	"The Burning Side"
Great White North 2K5	Great White North Records	2005	CD	"Ballet Addict"
Grind or Be Grinded!	Jedi Govna Tapes	January 2001	CD-R/Cassette	"Destined for Disaster"
The Hellish Arts of Perversion	The Flaming Arts		CD	"All Hands on Deck"; Don't Call My Slammin' Outfit Cool, Whitebread"
Infernos... 1	Gravesite Productions	May 29, 2002	Cassette	"Whisper Dependency"
Infinite Paradox 2	Fusion Audio Recordings	2001		"Merdarahta" "Scrotum Helmut"
The International Heavy Metal Box Set	Meat Head Records		Box set	
It's Not Rape If It's Dead	Slut Factory Records		CD-R	
Keep Pushing the Underground Volume Five	Westmont Metal Records	October 2, 200?	CD	
Kick 'Em While They're Down Volume 2	Goblin Records	April 2003	CD	
Killed by Canada	Fans of Bad Productions	October 27, 2006	2xCD	"Horizon (live)"
Malignant Defecation Vol. 2	Abhorrent Creation Tapes		Cassette	Struggle to Escape
Malignant Defecation Vol. 3	Abhorrent Creation Tapes		Cassette	"Glass Eye"
Noise Conglamorate	Anti-Everything		CD	"Wake Up Call"
Noise for Deaf Vol. 3	Rottenness Records		CD	
Noise for Deaf Vol. 4	Rottenness Records		CD	
The Only Good Human Being Is A Dead One	Dedfuk Records	1998	Cassette	"Skull Drudgery"
Ottawa vs. the World	Crustie Jo	April 2002	Cassette	"Scrotum Helmut"
Phantasmata Vol. 1	Phantasmata Production	2002	CD	"23-17-41"
Process Putrefaction	Jedi Govna Tapes		CD-R	Process Putrefaction
Profusion Volume 2	Prodisk	2006	CD	"Another Living Night"
Ravendance	Mortuary Khage Productions	September 2000	Cassette	"Give Up"
Relapse Sampler 2006	Relapse Records	2006	CD	"The Wrecking"
Rise of the Robots	Ghetto Blaster Recordings	August 2001	CD-R	"132 and the Evil Jesus"
Same Shit Another Name Vol. 1	Scrotum Records	1999	Cassette	"Revenge Tactics"
Sound of Murder	Ghetto Blaster Recordings	June 2002	CD-R	
Sound of Murder II	Ghetto Blaster Recordings	2003	CD-R	
Sound Power Station	Empty Chairs	2001	Cassette	
Squid Sperm Compilation Tape	Kinetic Sleaze	2000/2001	Cassette	"Vaginal Tears" "Vagina vs. Machine"
Squid Sperm: Etiquette Boutique	Kinetic Sleaze			
Symbolic Degeneration	Symbolic Productions	August 15, 2001	CD-R	"123-223"
Tapes Have More Personality	Scrotum Records	2000	Cassette	"Audio Trauma"
Torture at the Speed of Sound 6: Decayed Souls	Self Destruction Records	May 2001	Cassette	"A Dream Inked in Murder"
Trois-Rivières Metalfest 2003	Galy Records	2003	CD	"Second Hand Skin"
Trois-Rivières Metalfest 2007	Galy Records	2007	CD	"Medicated Like a Motherfucker"
The Tyranny Of Noise	Violet Produkt	1999	Cassette	"Snitchas"
The Ultimate Onslaught Vol. 1	Fecal-Matter Discorporated	2003	CD-R	"Whisper Dependency"
Underground Series 1	Meat 5000 Records	2006	CD	"Le Tete Hors De L'eau"
Unknown Title	Empty Chairs		LP	"Sex with Angels" "Whiskey Shot"
Unknown Title	Fusion Audio Recordings	2001		"Calcutta Cab Ride Parts 1-3"
Unknown Title	Gore Cult Productions		7" vinyl	"Packin' Forties"
Unknown Title	Riotous Assembly Records	2000/2001	CD	"Ninja Sweater"
Unknown Title	Sick Noise	2000/2001	2xCD	"Hellbent Disco King" "The Give And Take" "Control.net," "Take Shit, Give Shit"
Unknown Title	Unknown label out of the Czech Republic			"Crumbs"
Welcome to Hell: Benefit for Food Not Bombs Ireland	Protest Records		CD	"The Burning Side"
World Compilation	Negative Federal Fund Records	2006	CD	"Taken from the Nest"
Worldwide Violence	Zas! Autoproduzioni	October 2002	7" vinyl	"Disease in Friction"

=== Tributes ===
Title	Label	Release date	Format	Tracks included
1985 Tribute	Impaler Records		CD	"Proud to Be a Canadian" (Dayglo Abortions cover)
Godflesh: Tribute	Nihilistic Holocaust		CD-R	"Devastator"
Slayer Tribute	Necroblasting Entertainment			"Necrophilliac"
Together As One: A Tribute to Death	Mondongo Canibale Records	2003-02-18	CD	"Empty Words"
The Tribute to Unholy Grave	My Lai Productions		3" CD-R	"Confession"

=== Magazine compilations ===
Title	Label	Release date	Format	Tracks included
American Waste	Bad People Records	2002-04	CD	"Lack of Imagination
Ancient Ceremonies Vol. 2	Ancient Ceremonies Magazine		CD	"Slave"
Ancient Ceremonies Vol. 3	Ancient Ceremonies Magazine	2001	CD	"Sissy Master"
Armed Forces Vol. 1	Ad Arma! Magazine	2001-07	CD	"Roach"
Beloved Apocalypse	Vampiria Magazine	2002-09	CD	"Released"
Black Hole Vol. 1	Black Hole Magazine	2001-04	CD	"Dead Red" "Lack of Imagination"
Golden Lakes Productions Issue #2	Golden Lake		CD	
IBOL Records (Mag) (A) (Zine) 2	IBOL Records	2001-10	CD-R	"Calcutta Cab Ride Part 2"
KultRock Sound # 6	Kult Rock	2006	CD	"23-17-41"
Legacy 03/08	Legacy Magazine	2008-02	CD	"State of Panic"
Metallian Sampler N°37	Metallian Editions	2005	CD	"This Means Nothing"
My Kingdom	Vampiria Magazine	2001-08	CD	"Roach"
Oskorei Magazine #5	Oskorei Magazine	2000-09	CD	"The Meat People"
Shrouded in Silence III	The UnderGrowth	2009-05	Digital	"La Culture Du Faux"
Static Exemplar #13 Vol. #2	Static Zine	2001	CD-R	"Sell Out! Sell Out! Sold" "The Gift Of Shit" "Swallow Up"
Your Sex Is My Drug #6	Your Sex Is My Drug Zine			
