= Fuck the Facts split albums =

This is a comprehensive list of the split albums that Fuck the Facts has appeared on. Only the track listing and recording information for Fuck the Facts contributions are listed.

== 2000 ==
=== Split with Cult of the Damned ===
Fuck the Facts / Cult of the Damned

Studio album
- Released: 2000
- Recorded: 1997–1999
- Genre: Grindcore
- Label: Grindrot D.I.Y. Productions

This was released on cassette only. All tracks can be found on the self-titled cassette release except for "Depressive Obsession" and "Armageddon Waltz" which are both exclusive to this split. Armageddon Waltz has since been re-released as enhanced content on Legacy of Hopelessness.

==== Lineup ====
- Topon Das — All instruments

==== Track listing ====
1. "Getting Paid for It"
2. "They Lie"
3. "Turntables"
4. "All Gone"
5. "Depressive Obsession"
6. "Armageddon Waltz"
7. "Lack of Imagination"
8. "Living on Your Knees"
9. "Power Trip"
10. "He Won't Leave Alive"

=== Split with Longdreamdead ===
Fuck the Facts / Longdreamdead

Studio album
- Released: 2000
- Recorded: 1997–1999
- Genre: Grindcore
- Label: Abhorrent Creation Tapes

This was released on cassette only. All tracks can be found on the self-titled cassette release except for "Exhaust." Tracks 1–3 written and recorded April 1999. Track 4 written and recorded 1997. Tracks 5–6 written and recorded June 1999.

==== Lineup ====
- Topon Das — All instruments

==== Track listing ====
1. "Destined for Disaster"
2. "Angry Ron"
3. "Released"
4. "Exhaust"
5. "Scratching the Surface"
6. "Give Up"

=== First split with S.M.E.S. ===
Fuck the Facts / S.M.E.S.

Studio album
- Released: September 9, 2000
- Recorded: 2000
- Genre: Grindcore
- Label: Dedfuk Records / Zas! Autoproduzioni (co-production)

This was released on cassette only. In 2004 it was reissued with the other S.M.E.S. split on CD by Fecal-Matter Discorporated.

==== Lineup ====
- Topon Das — All instruments

==== Track listing ====
1. "Know Your Dope Fiend"
2. "Released"
3. "Sell Out! Sell Out! Sold."
4. "Packin' Forties"
5. "Untitled"
6. "Dead Red"
7. "Lack of Imagination"
8. "The Gift of Shit"
9. "Swallow Up"
10. "Roach"

=== Primitive Instinct ===
Primitive Instinct

Studio album by Fuck the Facts, C.A.D., Diktat, Psychoneurosis and Godless Truth
- Released: October 19, 2000
- Recorded: 1997–1999
- Genre: Grindcore
- Label: Symbolic Productions

This was released on cassette only. All tracks can be found on the self-titled cassette release.

==== Lineup ====
- Topon Das — All instruments

==== Track listing ====
1. "Getting Paid for It"
2. "They Lie"
3. "Turntables"
4. "All Gone"

== 2001 ==
=== Split with Inhumate, Bloodshed, Mastectomia and Pulmonary Fibrosis ===
Fuck the Facts / Inhumate / Bloodshed / Mastectomia / Pulmonary Fibrosis

Studio album
- Released: 2001
- Recorded: 2000
- Genre: Grindcore
- Label: Unite Bleeding Tapes / Abhorrent Creation Tapes (co-production)

This was released on cassette only.

==== Lineup ====
- Topon Das — All instruments
- Shomir Das — Guest vocals on "Necrophilliac"

==== Track listing ====
1. "Fucking Up Motherfuckers"
2. "A Dream Inked in Murder"
3. "The Pain Stake"
4. "Scum Bathing"
5. "Necrophilliac" (written by Slayer)

=== Split with Mastectomia ===
Fuck the Facts / Mastectomia

Studio album
- Released: January 10, 2001
- Recorded: 2000
- Genre: Grindcore
- Label: Unite Bleeding Tapes

This was released on cassette only. The cover is "Birth Machine" by H. R. Giger.

==== Lineup ====
- Topon Das — All instruments
- Shomir Das — Guest vocals on "Necrophilliac"

==== Track listing ====
1. "Fucking Up Motherfuckers"
2. "A Dream Inked in Murder"
3. "The Pain Stake"
4. "Scum Bathing"
5. "Necrophilliac" (written by Slayer)

=== A Japanese Winter ===
A Japanese Winter

Studio album by Fuck the Facts / Mourmansk 150 / De Madeliefjes
- Released: February 2001
- Recorded: 1999
- Genre: Grindcore
- Label: Symbolic Productions

This was released on cassette only. Limited to 50 copies. All tracks can be found on the self-titled cassette.

==== Lineup ====
- Topon Das — All instruments

==== Track listing ====
1. "Strapped for Love"
2. "Angry Ron"
3. "Released"
4. "Snitchas"

=== Split with Ames Sanglantes ===
Fuck the Facts / Ames Sanglantes

Studio album
- Released: April 20, 2001
- Recorded: April 2001
- Genre: Grindcore
- Label: Ghetto Blaster Recordings

This was released on CD-R only. This was re-released in the enhanced content of the Mullet Fever reissue in 2005.

==== Lineup ====
- Topon Das
- Matt Connell
- Tim Audette

==== Track listing ====
1. "Blood Pulp" - 14:30

=== Second split with S.M.E.S. ===
Fuck the Facts / S.M.E.S.

Studio album
- Released: July 23, 2001
- Recorded: September 2000
- Genre: Grindcore
- Label: Impregnate Records

This was released on cassette only. In 2004 it was reissued with the other S.M.E.S. split on CD by Fecal-Matter Discorporated.

==== Lineup ====
- Topon Das — All instruments

==== Track listing ====
1. "Hellbent Disco King"
2. "The Give and Take"
3. "Nazi Skin Smashed to Shit"
4. "Accessorized"
5. "Control.net"
6. "Subsidy"
7. "Spoiled Human Race"

== 2002 ==
=== Split with Conure ===
Fuck the Facts / Conure

Studio album
- Released: 2002
- Recorded: 2001
- Genre: Grindcore
- Label: Ghetto Blaster Recordings

These tracks were created & recorded during 2002 and released on CD-R only. They were re-released on the enhanced portion of Collection of Splits 2002–2004.

==== Lineup ====
- Topon Das
- Matt Connell
- Tim Audette

==== Track listing ====
1. "How Much for That Doggy in the Window" - 4:08
2. "Slough" - 2:53
3. "Hate Is Our Religion" - 4:42
4. "A.M. Noise I" - 2:58
5. "Fear Drives a Honda" - 2:23
6. "Fuckin' Useless" - 4:50

=== Innocence Is Not Lost, It Is Taken. ===
Fuck the Facts / Retch

Studio album
- Released: March 22, 2002
- Recorded: 2001
- Genre: Grindcore
- Label: Vendredi 13 Recordings

This was released on cassette only. Tracks 1 to 5 and 7 taken from Mullet Fever. Track 6 taken from the split with Conure. Tracks 8 and 9 are previously unreleased live tracks.

==== Lineup ====
- Tim Audette
- Brent Christoff
- Matt Connell
- Topon Das

==== Track listing ====
1. "Unfocused"
2. "Gated Community"
3. "Honey, Please! Not in Front of the Children"
4. "Cold Turkey"
5. "Master of Puppets" (Metallica cover)
6. "How Much for That Doggy in the Window"
7. "Roach (Live)"
8. "Perpetrator (Live)"
9. "Lack of Imagination (Live)"

=== Split with P.O.T ===
Fuck the Facts / P.O.T

Studio album
- Recorded: 2002
- Genre: Noise
- Label: Prole Records

This was released on CD only. "Whisper Dependency (Video Game Version)" was released on the split with Feeble Minded and again on Collection of Splits 2002–2004. All other tracks except "Terror Bomb" were re-released as enhanced content on the Collection of Splits 2002–2004. Mel Mongeon appears as a guest vocalist on the track "Guinness Madness," however, by the time this was released, she was a member of the band. it is unknown why Matt Connell is not referred on this release since he was part of the band at the time this was recorded.

==== Lineup ====
- Tim Audette
- Topon Das

==== Track listing ====
1. "Just Like the First Time We Met" - 1:36
2. "Guinness Madness" - 0:48
3. "Fighting Fashion" - 2:50
4. "Terror Bomb" - 1:06
5. "Mindloss" - 4:55
6. "Old Woman Undressing" - 1:17
7. "Whisper Dependency (Video Game Version)" - 2:05
8. "Jack Hammers" - 3:00

=== Split with Skoda 120 ===
Fuck the Facts / Skoda 120

Studio album
- Released: 2002
- Recorded: 2000
- Genre: Grindcore
- Label: Beer Is Not Drink Records / Ghetto Blaster Recordings (co-productions)

This was released on cassette and CD-R. All tracks can be found on Discoing the Dead.

==== Lineup ====
- Topon Das — All instruments

==== Track listing ====
1. "Ninja Sweater" - 3:36
2. "Proud to Be a Canadian" (written by Dayglo Abortions)- 1:44
3. "Disco Rage" - 3:46
4. "Whisper Dependency" - 2:10
5. "The Burning Side" - 3:59
6. "123-223" - 3:28
7. "Perpetrator" - 2:36

=== Split with Kastrat ===
Fuck the Facts / Kastrat

Studio album
- Released: 2002
- Recorded: Fall 2001
- Genre: Grindcore
- Label: Zas! Autoproduzioni / Nuclear Assault Records (co-production)

500 copies were pressed on black vinyl and 350 on pink and white splatter vinyl. All tracks can be found on Mullet Fever.

==== Lineup ====
- Tim Audette
- Brent Christoff
- Matt Connell
- Topon Das

==== Track listing ====
1. "All Hands on Deck" -
2. "Don't Call My Slammin' Outfit Cool, Whitebread!" -
3. "Gag Abflex" -
4. "Honey Please! Not in Front of the Children" -
5. "Math Rock Superstar" -
6. "$4 Bill" -
7. "Gated Community" -
8. "Red Mist" -
9. "Bowling" -
10. "Yngwie vs. FTF" -
11. "If You're 555, Then You're Giving Me a Fake Number" -
12. "Cold Turkey" -
13. "Instrumental (Hugs and Stitches)" -
14. "Cough Dropped from a Building" -

=== The Great One ===
The Great One

Studio album by Fuck the Facts / No Refund / Mermaid in a Manhole
- Released: November 2002
- Recorded: Fall 2001
- Genre: Grindcore
- Label: Ghetto Blaster Recordings

This was released on CD-R only. All tracks can be found on Mullet Fever.

==== Lineup ====
- Tim Audette
- Brent Christoff
- Matt Connell
- Topon Das

==== Track listing ====
1. "All Hands on Deck - 0:15
2. "Don't Call Slammin' Outfit Cool, Whitebread! - 0:43
3. "Doghead" - 0:32
4. "Burning the Grindcore Rule Book" - 1:00
5. "Cough Dropped from a Building" - 0:04
6. "Mullet Fever" - 0:06
7. "Gag Abflex" - 0:17
8. "Honey Please Not in Front of the Children" - 0:32
9. "$4 Bill" - 0:08
10. "Gated Community" - 1:09
11. "I'm From (Europe)" - 0:56
12. "Cue Bert and Ernie Reyes" - 0:22
13. "Mathrock Superstar" - 0:31
14. "Castrata" - 1:21
15. "Bowling" - 0:14
16. "Yngwie vs. FTF" - 0:32
17. "I Babysit for Drug Money" - 0:35
18. "Red Mist" - 0:12
19. "Me and Dani Filth in a 6-4" - 0:57
20. "South Beach High" - 0:59
21. "Cold Turkey" - 0:17
22. "Instrumental (Hugs and Stitches)" - 0:48
23. "The Words Myth" - 1:32
24. "Unfocused" - 0:56
25. "Fisherman's Fiend" - 0:31
26. "If You're 555, Then You're Giving Me a Fake Number" - 0:10
27. "You Smoke, You Toke" - 0:12
28. "Running Outta Time" - 0:39
29. "Day Dream" - 0:19
30. "Mattochondria" - 0:13
31. "Fate of Man" - 2:19
32. "Master of Puppets" - 1:40
33. "Outro (Sonny Bono)" - 1:44

=== Split with Iron Bitchface ===
Fuck the Facts / Iron Bitchface

Studio album
- Released: November 2002
- Recorded: April 19, 2002
- Genre: Grindcore
- Label: Slut Factory Records

This was released on CD-R only. All tracks are performed live in Ottawa, Ontario at The Underground. These tracks were also released on the live album.

==== Lineup ====
- Tim Audette
- Matt Connell
- Topon Das
- Mel Mongeon

==== Track listing ====
1. "Released" - 00:36
2. "Whisper Dependency" - 01:59
3. "The Burning Side" - 03:54
4. "Yngwie vs. FTF" - 00:57
5. "Roach" - 02:55

=== Split CD with Jan AG ===
Fuck the Facts / Jan AG

Studio album
- Released: December 2002
- Recorded: 2002
- Genre: Grindcore
- Label: Symbolic Productions

This was released on CD-R only. Tracks 1 and 2 can be found on Backstabber Etiquette. Track 3 can be found on the split with P.O.T. Tracks 5 to 9 can be found on the split with Iron Bitchface and the live album. Tracks 10 to 12 can be found on the split with P.O.T and on the enhanced portion of Collection of Splits 2002–2004.

==== Lineup ====
- Tim Audette
- Matt Connell
- Topon Das
- Mel Mongeon

==== Track listing ====
1. "N.S.S.T.S."
2. "The Burning Side"
3. "Terror Bomb"
4. "Smokin' a Fatty" (live)
5. "Released (live)"
6. "Whisper Dependency (live)"
7. "The Burning Side (live)"
8. "Yngwie vs. FTF (live)"
9. "Roach (live)"
10. "Mindloss"
11. "Fighting Fashion"
12. "Whisper Dependency (video game version)"

=== Split with Monolith ===
Fuck the Facts / Monolith

Studio album
- Released: December 2002
- Recorded: 2002
- Genre: Grindcore
- Label: Melt Sultan Records

This was released on CD-R only.

==== Lineup ====
- Tim Audette
- Matt Connell
- Topon Das
- Mel Mongeon

==== Track listing ====
1. "Burning the Grindcore Rule Book (live)"
2. "Cloud Forms (live)"
3. "Smokin' a Fatty (live)"
4. "Another Broken Guitar (live)"

=== Split with Manherringbone ===
Fuck the Facts / Manherringbone

Studio album
- Released: December 2002
- Recorded: May 2002
- Genre: Grindcore
- Label: IBOL Records

This was released on CD-R only. Re-released as enhanced content on Collection of Splits 2002–2004. Though the full band had been assembled for about a year at the time of these recordings, Topon is credited as the sole creator.

==== Lineup ====
- Topon Das

==== Track listing ====
1. "Washed Up"
2. "Underwater Air Tank Misery"
3. "Larium Nights"
4. "Phonophobia"
5. "You Will Crash You Will Die"

=== Born in a Riot ===
Born in a Riot

Studio album by Fuck the Facts and Fever Spoor
- Released: December 2002
- Recorded: 2002
- Genre: Grindcore
- Label: Anima Mal Nata

This was released on CD-R only. All music by both Fuck the Facts and Fever Spoor.

==== Lineup ====
- Topon Das
- Marcel Herms (Fever Spoor)

==== Track listing ====
1. "(Ghost) Riders in the Sky"
2. "Hours of Glass"
3. "A Dark Age"
4. "Disposition"
5. "Frustrated & Angry"
6. "I’m Not Impressed"
7. "A Range of Conditions"
8. "Police Line – Do Not Cross"
9. "Tombstone"
10. "I’m Gonna Shoot All the Lights Out of This Fucking City"
11. "Sol Invictus"
12. "We Are All This"
13. "Drowning Man"
14. "Downstairs"
15. "Why Don’t You Wanna Be Just Like Us?"
16. "Ritual for the Goat Master"
17. "Waiting for Grandma"

== 2003 ==
=== Split with Banzai 606 ===
Fuck the Facts / Banzai 606

Studio album
- Released: 2003
- Recorded: May 2001
- Genre: Grindcore
- Label: First Aid Productionss

All tracks originally featured on the Four0ninE EP and re-released on the Mullet Fever reissue.

==== Lineup ====
- Tim Audette
- Brent Christoff
- Matt Connell
- Shomir Das
- Topon Das

==== Track listing ====
1. "Released" - 0:22
2. "Whisper Dependency" - 2:03
3. "Roach" - 2:17
4. "Lack of Imagination" - 1:02
5. "409" (written by the Beach Boys) - 2:13

=== Split with Necrobestiality and Winters In Osaka ===
Fuck the Facts / Necrobestiality / Winters in Osaka

Studio album
- Released: 2003
- Recorded: September 9, 2001
- Genre: Grindcore
- Label: My Lai Productions

All tracks recorded live in Ottawa, ON and also appear on the live album.

==== Lineup ====
- Tim Audette
- Brent Christoff
- Matt Connell
- Topon Das

==== Track listing ====
1. "Roach"
2. "Perpetrator"
3. "Lack of Imagination"
4. "Smokin' a Fatty"
5. "The Burning Side"
6. "Whisper Dependency"
7. "Released"
8. "Marsha"
9. "Cloud Forms (Fade Out)"

=== Split with Hewhocorrupts, Distorcion Social and Obbrobrio ===
Fuck the Facts / Hewhocorrupts / Distorcion Social / Obbrobrio

Studio album
- Released: 2003
- Recorded: Spring 2003 (drums); Summer 2003 (everything else)
- Genre: Grindcore
- Label: My Lai Productions

Released on a 3" mini CD in a regular CD case. On this release, each band takes one track. Fuck the Facts only contributed one song, but the other bands contribute multiple songs on one track. Mixed and mastered summer 2003. This track appears on the split with Feeble Minded and again on Collection of Splits 2002–2004.

==== Lineup ====
- Matt Connell
- Topon Das
- Mel Mongeon

==== Track listing ====
1. "Terminal Skullet" - 2:45

=== Split tape with Jan AG ===
Fuck the Facts / Jan AG

Studio album
- Released: 2003
- Recorded: September 2000
- Genre: Grindcore
- Label: N:C:U

This was only released on cassette. Limited to 100 copies. Both tracks were originally released on the second split with S.M.E.S. and appear on the compilation of both S.M.E.S. splits.

==== Track listing ====
1. "Accessorized"
2. "Spoiled Human Race"

=== She's Hot! ===
She's Hot!

Studio album by Fuck the Facts / Ultrapodre
- Released: March 1, 2003
- Genre: Grindcore
- Label: War Productions

This was released on cassette only, limited to 500 copies.

- "Needle Through Thread" was originally exclusive to the Anomalous Silencer #5 (Napalmed)
- "Disease In Friction" was originally exclusive to the Worldwide Violence compilation (Zas! Autoproduzioni)
- "Ninja Sweater (demo version)" was exclusive to this release, but later appeared on the reissue of Discoing the Dead as a bonus track.
- "Sissy Master" was originally exclusive to the Ancient Ceremonies Vol. 3 compilation (Ancient Ceremonies Magazine).
- "The Meat People" was originally exclusive to Oskorei Magazine #5 (Oskorei Magazine). It later appeared on Extreme Rock 'n' Roll Star Vol. 1 (Unite Bleeding Tapes)
- "Slave" was originally exclusive to the Ancient Ceremonies Vol. 2 compilation (Ancient Ceremonies Magazine).

==== Lineup ====
- Fuck the Facts - Topon Das
- Ultrapodre - Unknown

==== Track listing ====
1. Fuck the Facts - "Needle Through Thread"
2. Fuck the Facts - "Disease In Friction"
3. Fuck the Facts - "Ninja Sweater (demo version)"
4. Fuck the Facts - "Sissy Master"
5. Fuck the Facts - "The Meat People"
6. Fuck the Facts - "Slave"
7. Ultrapodre - "Intro: Mutant Rage Against Mediocrity / The Museum of Decapitated Penis"
8. Ultrapodre - "Dragqueen Cadaver"
9. Ultrapodre - "Disco Fellatio"
10. Ultrapodre - "Lugubrious Vision of an Exposed Fracture Caused By Uncontrolled Attempts at Triple Penetratio"
11. Ultrapodre - "Mortal Incisions in the Testicle"
12. Ultrapodre - "Disgrace to the Corpse of John Holmes"
13. Ultrapodre - "Sulphurcumshot"
14. Ultrapodre - "Tong Po's Tantric Manifesto (Shangri-La Grindcore Express)"
15. Ultrapodre - "Morgue Jerkoff Holocaust"
16. Ultrapodre - "Erectile Disorders"
17. Ultrapodre - "Anthem to the Lobotomized Ejaculator"

=== Split with Sylvester Staline ===
Fuck the Facts / Sylvester Staline

Studio album
- Released: July 2003
- Recorded: October 2002
- Genre: Grindcore
- Label: Anvil of Fury Records

This was released on 970 black 7-inch vinyl copies. Recorded at drummer Matt Connell's house. Artwork by Mel Mongeon.

==== Lineup ====
- Tim Audette
- Matt Connell
- Topon Das
- Mel Mongeon

==== Track listing ====
1. "The Transformation"
2. "Confession" (written by Unholy Grave)
3. "Empty Words" (written by Death)
4. "What I Am"

=== Split with Feeble Minded ===
Fuck the Facts / Feeble Minded

Studio album
- Released: November 2003
- Recorded: Spring 2003 (drums); Summer 2003 (everything else)
- Genre: Grindcore
- Label: Grodhaisn Productions

Mixed and mastered summer 2003.

==== Lineup ====
- Matt Connell
- Topon Das
- Mel Mongeon
- Tim Audette (additional)

==== Track listing ====
1. "Devastator" (written by Godflesh)
2. "Terminal Skullet"
3. "Fingers with Candy Tips"
4. "Don't Call Japanese Hardcore Japcore" (written by Anal Cunt)
5. "Leper Accountant"
6. "Merdarahta"
7. "The Jaquio"
8. "Whisper Dependency (Video Game Version)"

== 2004 ==
=== Compilation split with S.M.E.S. ===
Fuck the Facts / S.M.E.S.

Studio album
- Released: February 2004
- Recorded: July and September 2000
- Genre: Grindcore
- Label: Fecal-Matter Discorporated

This was released as a double CD-R compilation in a DVD case limited to 150 copies. It contains all of the material recorded by both bands for their two splits originally released in 2000. The second half of the Fuck the Facts CD-R is one track.

==== Lineup ====
- Topon Das
- Shomir Das (additional vocals)

==== Track listing ====
1. "Hell Bent Disco King"
2. "The Give and Take"
3. "Nazi Skins Smashed to Shit"
4. "Accessorized"
5. "Control.net"
6. "Subsidy (written by Oppressed Conscience)"
7. "Spoiled Human Race"
8. "Know Your Dope Fiend"
  1. "Know Your Dope Fiend"
  2. "Released"
  3. "Sell Out! Sell Out! Sold."
  4. "Packin' Forties"
  5. "Untitled"
  6. "Dead Red"
  7. "Lack of Imagination"
  8. "The Gift of Shit"
  9. "Swallow Up"
  10. "Roach"

=== Overseas Connection ===
Overseas Connection

Studio album by Fuck the Facts / Sergeant Slaughter
- Released: May 1, 2005
- Recorded: Spring 2003 (drums); October–December 2003 (everything else); March 7, 2002 (live tracks)
- Genre: Grindcore
- Label: Meat 5000 Records / Undecent Records (co-production)

This was pressed on 1000 CD copies. Drums recorded at Park Place. Everything else recorded at Woodfield's Basement. Bonus live tracks recorded at The Kathedral in Toronto, Ontario, Canada. When recording began for this, Dave Menard was not officially in the band. Before recording finished and by the time this was released, he was. These tracks (except the live tracks) were re-released on the Collection of Splits 2002–2004.

==== Lineup ====
- Matt Connell
- Topon Das
- Mel Mongeon
- Dave Menard (additional guitar on "This Means Nothing" and "Ventriloquist Complex")
- Tim Audette (guitar on live tracks)
- Wiande (from Sergeant Slaughter, vocals on "This Means Nothing")
- Swiz (from Electrocutionerdz, sampling on "Unburden" and "Ventriloquist Complex")

==== Track listing ====
1. "Medicated Like a Motherfucker" - 0:50
2. "This Means Nothing" - 1:34
3. "La Tête Hors De L'eau" - 3:26
4. "Born to Kill Live to Thrill" - 1:04
5. "Unburden" - 2:39
6. "Ventriloquist Complex" - 2:28
7. "Second Hand Skin (live)" - 2:57
8. "Smokin' a Fatty (live)" - 3:25

=== Split with Subcut ===
Fuck the Facts / Subcut

Studio album
- Released: November 3, 2004
- Recorded: 2004
- Genre: Grindcore
- Label: Bucho Discos

400 copies were pressed on red vinyl. These tracks were re-released on the Collection of Splits 2002–2004. There was a problem during pressing that created a problem with the audio on Fuck the Facts side, so they distributed each copy with a CD-R as well.

==== Lineup ====
- Matt Connell
- Topon Das
- Dave Menard
- Mel Mongeon
- Mike Alexander (from Head Hits Concrete, vocals on "Another Living Night")

==== Track listing ====
1. "Secret Asian"
2. "Another Living Night"
3. "No One Remembered Who Started"

=== Split with Cakewet ===
Fuck the Facts / Cakewet

Studio album
- Released: November 15, 2004
- Recorded: 2002
- Genre: Grindcore
- Label: Human Circus Records

This was released on cassette only. Limited to 100 copies.

==== Track listing ====
Track listing unknown. The band contributes some live tracks recorded in 2002 and 2 songs from different split 7-inch releases.

== 2005 ==
=== Split with Narcosis, Midget Parade and Archer ===
Fuck the Facts / Narcosis / Midget Parade / Archer

Studio album
- Released: August 22, 2005
- Recorded: November 12, 2004 (drums and bass); November–December 2004 (everything else)
- Genre: Grindcore
- Label: Privileged to Fail Records

Limited to a one-time pressing of 1000 CDs. These tracks can be found on Fuck the Facts Legacy of Hopelessness EP. This split served as the UK release of that EP.

Drums and bass recorded at June Music Studio. Everything else recorded at The House Of Fuck. Mixed and mastered at CB Audio early 2005.

==== Lineup ====
- Topon Das
- Dave Menard
- Marc-Andre Mongeon
- Mel Mongeon
- Tim Olsen

==== Track listing ====
1. "City of Stone" - 1:46
2. "Horizon" - 0:41
3. "Dear Shit Book" - 1:11
4. "Short-Term Goals, Long Term Disappointments" - 2:14
5. "Éclat-Boue-Sang" - 2:44
6. "Make Your Grave" - 1:32

== 2006 ==
=== Split with Pleasant Valley ===
Fuck the Facts / Pleasant Valley

Studio album
- Released: July 2006
- Recorded: November 2005
- Genre: Grindcore
- Label: Reprocreate Records

400 copies were pressed on black vinyl and another 400 pressed on a variety of marble colours including grey and purple. Recorded, mixed and mastered by Matt Connell. This is a pre-production version of the song that was eventually re-recorded for Stigmata High-Five.

==== Lineup ====
- Steve Chartier
- Topon Das
- Mel Mongeon
- Tim Olsen
- Mathieu Vilandré

==== Track listing ====
1. "The Wreaking" - 4:45

=== Split with Mesrine ===
Fuck the Facts / Mesrine

Studio album
- Released: October 2006
- Recorded: October 2005
- Genre: Grindcore
- Label: Sonic Deadline Records

500 copies were pressed on white vinyl. Recorded in Ottawa by Matt Connell. This is a pre-production version of the song that was eventually re-recorded for Stigmata High-Five.

==== Lineup ====
- Steve Chartier
- Topon Das
- Mel Mongeon
- Tim Olsen
- Mathieu Vilandré

==== Track listing ====
1. "Taken from the Nest" - 5:21

== 2007 ==
=== 4625 ===
4625

Studio album by Fuck the Facts / The Crinn / World Downfall / Nesseria
- Released: August 8, 2007
- Genre: Grindcore
- Label: IV Seasons Records

Strictly limited to 500 copies on 10-inch vinyl. This track can be found on Stigmata High-Five.

==== Track listing ====
1. "What's Left Behind"

== 2008 ==
=== Split with Leng Tch'e ===
Fuck the Facts / Leng Tch'e

Studio album
- Released: October 21, 2008
- Genre: Grindcore
- Label: Power It Up Records

This split was released on 7-inch vinyl and CD. Both bands' contributions are exclusive to this split.

Tracks 3, 4, 9 and 10 only appear on the CD.

==== Track listing ====
1. Leng Tch'e - Misleading Innuendos - 2:39
2. Leng Tch'e - Redemption Meltdown - 2:31
3. Leng Tch'e - The Hand That Strangles - 2:19
4. Leng Tch'e - Black Holes - 4:16
5. Fuck the Facts - Like Yesterday - 1:11
6. Fuck the Facts - Self-Traitor - 1:33
7. Fuck the Facts - Everyone Is Robbing the Dead - 2:00
8. Fuck the Facts - Slave - 1:08
9. Fuck the Facts - Charlatan - 1:40
10. Fuck the Facts - My Failures (Just Like Yesterday) - 2:57

== 2009 ==
=== Split with Mincing Fury and Guttural Clamour of Queer Decay ===
Live Split

Live album
- Released: April 2009
- Genre: Grindcore, death metal
- Label: Burning Dogma Records

This split was released on CD and was originally intended to be released in 2005. However, Burning Dogma Records owner Rickey Lockett was incarcerated shortly before the release and it was delayed almost four years.
Fuck the Facts tracks were recorded & mixed by Dave Sarazin and mastered by Craig Boychuck. Recorded November 13, 2005 @ Mavericks in Ottawa, ON.
Mincing Fury tracks were recorded February 21, 2004, by Doug.

==== Fuck the Facts Lineup ====
- Topon Das
- Mel Mongeon
- Tim Olsen
- Mathieu Vilandré
- Steve Chartier

==== Mincing Fury Lineup ====
- Mara - Guitar
- Bibin - Guitar
- Fik - Bass
- Reef - Vocals
- Topinka - Vocals
- Jarin - Drums

==== Track listing ====
1. Fuck the Facts - "Horizon" - 0:45
2. Fuck the Facts - "The Burning Side" - 3:37
3. Fuck the Facts - "23-17-41" - 3:58
4. Fuck the Facts - "La Téte Hors de L'eau" - 3:19
5. Fuck the Facts - "Unburden" - 2:22
6. Mincing Fury and Guttural Clamour of Queer Decay - "Shit Song" - 1:39
7. Mincing Fury and Guttural Clamour of Queer Decay - "Explosion of Madness" - 3:45
8. Mincing Fury and Guttural Clamour of Queer Decay - "Upside Down" - 1:23
9. Mincing Fury and Guttural Clamour of Queer Decay - "(Un) Conquerable Soul" - 2:39
10. Mincing Fury and Guttural Clamour of Queer Decay - "Eye for Eye (Suffering for Suffering)" - 2:55
11. Mincing Fury and Guttural Clamour of Queer Decay - "Little Duck III" - 1:37
12. Mincing Fury and Guttural Clamour of Queer Decay - "Schism" - 3:26
13. Mincing Fury and Guttural Clamour of Queer Decay - "Rotter" - 1:51
14. Mincing Fury and Guttural Clamour of Queer Decay - "No Jokes with Devils" - 2:59

== Canceled Splits ==
Over the years, a few splits were planned with other bands, or rumored to exist, but were canceled or reworked for various reasons.

- Four0ninE was originally intended to be a split with Mortuary I.O.D. When that didn't happen, the band opted to release it as an EP.
- A split with Rune was briefly discussed, but never happened.
- A split with Canadian band Head Hits Concrete was mentioned by Craig Boychuk on his website in early 2005, but it never materialized.
- A split with Truth Unlimited was rumored, but never happened.
- A split with Japanese grindcore band Clotted Symmetric Sexual Organ (C.S.S.O.) was rumored, but never happened.
- The split with Mincing Fury and Guttural Clamour of Queer Decay was planned for release in 2005, but the Burning Dogma Records owner went to jail and the release was canceled. The tracks were featured as part of the limited EP The Wreaking in late 2008. Eventually, the split was released as originally planned in April 2009.
