= St. Jean Baptiste 2010 =

Compilation album by Fuck the Facts
- Released: June 23, 2010
- Recorded: 2003–2010
- Genre: Death metal, grindcore
- Label: Self released

Fuck the Facts chronology
| Disgorge Mexico: The DVD (2010) | St. Jean Baptiste 2010 (2010) | Live in Whitby (2010) |

St. Jean Baptiste 2010 is a French language digital compilation by Canadian grindcore band Fuck the Facts. It is in celebration of the national holiday in Quebec.

== Release ==
Fuck the Facts made this compilation available free during the St. Jean Baptiste celebration on June 23 and 24. Their MySpace, Facebook, and Bandcamp pages displayed the following message:

Un p’tit cadeau pour fêter la St-Jean : Compilation gratuite de toutes les chansons françaises de Fuck the Facts

Pour vous aider à célébrer la St-Jean Baptiste cette année, nous vous offrons une compilation, concoctée spécialement pour l’occasion, à télécharger gratuitement. Cette compil. comprend toutes les chansons françaises de Fuck the Facts.

Attention, ce téléchargement sera seulement disponible le 23 et 24 juin.

N’attendez donc pas; téléchargez-la maintenant! Ouvrer vous ensuite une bouteille de bière tablette, crinquez votre stéréo et fêtez comme un vrai colon.

== Track listing ==
| No. | Title | Lyrics | Music | Original Release | Length |
|---|---|---|---|---|---|
| 1. | "La Tête Hors de l’Eau [2010]" | Fuck the Facts | Fuck the Facts | Unnamed EP | 4:17 |
| 2. | "Charlatan" | Mel Mongeon | Mathieu Vilandré/Topon Das | Split with Leng Tch'e | 1:37 |
| 3. | "La Culture Du Faux" | Mongeon | Vilandré/Das | Disgorge Mexico | 3:07 |
| 4. | "La Dernière Image" | | With assistance from Dave Menard/Marc-André Mongeon/Tim Olsen | Stigmata High-Five | 7:01 |
| 5. | "Éclat-Boue-Sang" | Mongeon/Das | Das | Legacy of Hopelessness | 2:44 |
| 6. | "La Tête Hors de l’Eau [2003]" | Mongeon | Das/Matt Connell | Overseas Connection | 3:24 |

== Track details ==
The compilation spans approximately seven years of recording by the band.

| No. | Performers | Recording details |
|---|---|---|
| 1. | Topon Das (guitar); Mel Mongeon (vocals); Mathieu Vilandré (drums, guitar); Marc Bourgon (bass, vocals) | Drums recorded November 15, 2009 by Dave Sarazin @ Raven Street Studios (Ottawa, ON); Guitar, Bass & Vocals recorded November 16 – 28 2009 @ Super Pro Studio (Gatineau, QC); Mixed by Craig Boychuk December 2009 @ CB Audio (Winnipeg, MB); Mastered by Alan Douches December 2009 @ West West Side Music (New Windsor, NY) |
| 2. | Topon Das (guitar, samples); Mel Mongeon (vocals); Mathieu Vilandré (drums, guitar); Marc Bourgon (bass) | |
| 3. | Topon Das (guitar, bass); Mel Mongeon (vocals); Mathieu Vilandré (drums, guitar, bass) | Drums, guitars & bass recorded by Craig Boychuk August 6–17, 2007 @ Liverpool Court Studios (Ottawa, ON); Vocals recorded by Topon Das November 2007 @ The Tower of Self Medication Studio (Nepean, ON) |
| 4. | Topon Das (guitar, keyboards); Mel Mongeon (vocals); Mathieu Vilandré (drums, guitar); Steve Chartier (bass, vocals) | Recorded, mixed and mastered by Jean-Philippe Latour @ Studio En-Phase February 16 - March 1, 2006 |
| 5. | Topon Das (guitar, vocals, keyboards, midi); Mel Mongeon (vocals); Dave Menard (guitar); Marc-André Mongeon (bass); Tim Olsen (drums) | Drums and bass were recorded by Stéphane Danis at June Music Studio on November 12, 2004; Everything else was recorded by Topon Das at the House of Fuck November and December 2004; Mixed and mastered by Craig Boychuk at CB Audio early 2005 |
| 6. | Topon Das (guitar, bass); Matt Connell (drums); Mel Mongeon (vocals) | Drums Recorded by Matt Connell spring 2003 at Park Place; Everything else recorded by Topon Das Oct-Dec 2003 at Woodfield's Basement |
