= Missouri (disambiguation) =

Missouri is a midwestern U.S. state.

Missouri may also refer to:

== People ==
- Missouri H. Stokes (1838–1910), American social reformer, writer

== Places ==
- Missouri Territory, a U.S. territory from 1812 to 1821
- Missouri River, a U.S. river

== Educational institutions ==
- University of Missouri System
  - University of Missouri, the main campus of the system

== Ships ==
- CSS Missouri, an ironclad gunboat built by the Confederate States Navy in 1862
- SS Missouri, the name of several merchant ships
- USS Missouri, the name of five U.S. Navy vessels

== Other ==
- Missouria or Missouri, Native American tribe
- Missouri (band), American rock band
  - Missouri (album), 1977 album by the band

== See also ==
- Missouri City, Missouri, a suburb of Kansas City
- Missouri City, Texas, a suburb of Houston
- Misery (disambiguation)
- Mussoorie, Indian hill station
