= Misery =

Misery may refer to:

== Fiction ==
- Misery (novel), by Stephen King
- Misery (film), based on the novel
- Misery (play), based on the novel
- "Misery" (short story), by Anton Chekhov
- "Misery" (New Girl), a 2017 television episode
- "Misery" (The Upper Hand), a 1993 television episode
- Misery, a character in comic books starring the heroic pilot Airboy
- Misery, a character in the 2004 video game Cave Story
- Misery, a character in the television series Ruby Gloom

== Music ==
- Misery (band), an Australian death metal band
- Misery, a member of the English metal band Mistress

=== Albums ===
- Misery (album) or the title song, by the Amity Affliction, 2018
- Misery (EP) or the title song, by Fuck the Facts, 2011
- Misery, by Disentomb, 2014

=== Songs ===
- "Misery" (Beatles song), 1963
- "Misery" (Creeper song), 2017
- "Misery" (Gwen Stefani song), 2016 album
- "Misery" (hide song), 1996
- "Misery" (Maroon 5 song), 2010
- "Misery" (Pupsies song), 2026
- "Misery" (Soul Asylum song), 1995
- "Misery", by the Autumn Offering from Embrace the Gutter, 2006
- "Misery", by BoDeans from Love & Hope & Sex & Dreams, 1986
- "Misery", by Bullet for My Valentine from Jeff Killed John, 2003
- "Misery", by the Dynamics, 1963
- "Misery", by Earshot from Letting Go, 2002
- "Misery", by Gallows from Grey Britain, 2009
- "Misery", by Good Charlotte from Good Morning Revival, 2007
- "Misery", by Green Day from Warning, 2000
- "Misery", by HAM from Buffalo Virgin, 1989
- "Misery", by Hanson from Underneath, 2004
- "Misery", by Jaydes from Ghetto Cupid, 2023
- "Misery", by Jonathan Kelly's Outside from ...Waiting on You, 1974
- "Misery", by the Kinks from Low Budget, 1979
- "Misery", by Madness from Oui Oui, Si Si, Ja Ja, Da Da, 2012
- "Misery", by the Maine from Pioneer, 2011
- "Misery", by Matt Proxy from Trojan Horse, 2026
- "Misery", by Memphis May Fire from Remade in Misery, 2022
- "Misery", by the Moffatts from Chapter I: A New Beginning, 1998
- "Misery", by Nonpoint from The Return, 2014
- "Misery", by Pink from Missundaztood, 2001
- "Misery", by Spleen United from School of Euphoria, 2012
- "Misery", by Therapy? from Infernal Love, 1995
- "Misery", by War of Ages from Dominion, 2023
- "misery.", by pupsies, 2026

== Places ==
- Misery, Fribourg, former municipality in Fribourg, Switzerland
- Misery, Somme, commune in France

== People ==
- Misery, also known as Tanja McMillan, New Zealand artist

== See also ==
- Mount Misery (disambiguation)
- Misery Index (disambiguation)
- Sweet Misery (disambiguation)
- Miser (disambiguation)
- Missery, a commune in Côte-d'Or, France
- Missouri (disambiguation)
