= Red mist =

Red mist may refer to:

- Anger
- Red Mist, a fictional superhero in the comic book series Kick-Ass and the movie Kick-Ass
- "Red Mist", a song from the 2005 Boondox album The Harvest
- "Red Mist", a song from the 2001 Fuck the Facts album Mullet Fever
- "Red Mist", a song from the Danny Byrd album Supersized.
- Red Mist, a 2011 novel by Patricia Cornwell following the Dr. Kay Scarpetta storyline
- Red Mist (film) (international title Freakdog), a 2008 British horror film directed by Paddy Breathnach
- "Red Mist", also known as "Squidward's Suicide", an internet fan-made SpongeBob SquarePants creepypasta.
- "The Red Mist", a 2022 episode of Primal
- The Red Mist, an alias taken by one of the main characters of the 2021 indie game Library of Ruina

== See also ==
- Red Mist: Roy Keane and the Football Civil War, by Conor O'Callaghan
