= Miser (disambiguation) =

A miser is a person who is reluctant to spend money.

Miser may also refer to:

== Arts and entertainment ==
- The Miser, a 1668 play by Molière
  - The Miser (Fielding play), a 1733 work by Henry Fielding based on Molière's play
  - L'avaro (Anfossi) (Italian for "The Miser"), a 1775 opera composed by Pasquale Anfossi with a libretto based on Molière's play
  - The Miser, a comic opera (1782?) by Vasily Pashkevich based on Molière's play
- The Miser (1908 film), a French short silent film
- L'Avare (film), a 1980 French comedy film with the English title The Miser
- Kanjan (English: Miser), a 1947 Indian film
- The Miser (1990 film), an Italian comedy film
- Φάσμα ἢ Φιλάργυρος (The Miser), one of three surviving titles of works by Theognetus, an Ancient Greek comic poet
- The Miser, a 1979 TV programme - see List of television programmes produced by BBC Scotland

== Other uses ==
- Pete Miser, stage name of Peter Ho (born 1971), an Asian-American hip-hop rapper and producer
- Miser, a special model of the Dodge Omni subcompact car
- Miser Mine - see List of mines in Oregon
- Snow Miser and Heat Miser, two characters from the 1974 television special The Year Without a Santa Claus

== See also ==
- List of people known as the Miser
- MISER algorithm, used in numerical integration
- Misère (French for "poverty"), a bid in card games
