= GWN =

GWN may refer to:

- Ganja White Night, Belgian dubstep duo
- Global Wrestling Network
- Gowerton railway station, in Wales
- Great White North (disambiguation)
- Guild Wars Nightfall, a video game
- Gwandara language
- GWN7, a former Australian television network, formerly known as the Golden West Network
- Gwynedd, preserved county in Wales, Chapman code
