= Sweet Misery =

Sweet Misery may refer to:

- Sweet Misery, 1988 novel by Charlotte Hughes
- Sweet Misery, essay in the 2002 Songbook by Nick Hornby
- "Sweet Misery", 2005 episode of the sitcom Life with Derek

== Music ==
- Sweet Misery (Dylan Kight EP), 2006
- Sweet Misery, 2008 album by The Blackwater Fever

=== Songs ===
- "Sweet Misery", by Jimmy Dean on the 1967 country album The Jimmy Dean Show
- "Sweet Misery", by Janis Ian on the 1968 album The Secret Life of J. Eddy Fink
- "Sweet Misery", by Ferlin Husky on the 1971 country album One More Time
- "Sweet Misery", by Hoyt Axton on the 1973 country folk album Less Than the Song, covered by John Denver on the 1973 folk album Farewell Andromeda
- "Sweet Misery", by The Toll on the 1991 rock album Sticks and Stones and Broken Bones
- "Sweet Misery", by Amel Larrieux on the 2000 R&B soul album Infinite Possibilities
- "Sweet Misery", by Michelle Branch on the 2001 alternative/pop rock album The Spirit Room
- "Sweet Misery", by Rashad on the 2003 R&B/R&B album Sweet Misery
- "Sweet Misery", by Tiësto on the 2004 trance album Just Be
- "Sweet Misery", by Lisa Miskovsky on the 2006 pop rock album Changes
- "Sweet Misery", by Digital Summer on the 2008 acoustic album Hollow

== See also ==
- Sweet (disambiguation)
- Misery (disambiguation)
