= Allan Campbell McLean =

British writer

Allan Campbell McLean (18 November 1922 – 27 October 1989) was a British writer and political activist.

== Biography ==
McLean was born on Walney Island, Barrow-in-Furness, then in Lancashire, and educated at Barrow-in-Furness Technical School. His father, a sheet-metal worker on the Clyde who had moved south to find work, was latterly a foreman at the Vickers Shipbuilding and Engineering shipyards in Barrow.

McLean served in the Royal Air Force in the Mediterranean and North Africa during World War Two, later writing about his experiences of time spent in a military prison in his 1968 novel The Glasshouse. After the war he moved with his wife Mog to the Isle of Skye and turned his hand to writing. In addition to his published novels he also earned a living as a journalist, and in the 1970s wrote a column for the short-lived publication 7 Days, where he was vocal in his opposition to Scottish devolution and support for prison reform, agitating in particular for the closure of the notorious "cage" at HM Prison Inverness.

McLean was also involved in the Labour Party for several years, and was appointed chairman of the Scottish party executive committee in 1974. It was during his chairmanship that the committee voted by six votes to five against endorsing any of the Wilson Government's proposals for legislative devolution as featured in its White Paper on the subject, thereby provoking a "furious reaction... from Scots and English party members alike." He further courted controversy when he resigned from Labour's Scottish working party on crofting rights in 1976, after the Government rejected its proposal that crofting land be fully nationalised. Although McLean never seriously harboured parliamentary ambitions, he had previously been the Labour candidate for Inverness at the 1964 and 1966 general elections. He was also chairman of the Inverness constituency Labour Party during the 1970s.

== Works ==
McLean was the writer of a number of children's novels: The Hill of the Red Fox (1955; a contemporary spy story set in Skye); The Man of the House (1956; known as Storm over Skye in the US); Ribbon of Fire (1962; also set in Skye around the time of the Highland Clearances); Master of Morgana (1965); The Year of the Stranger (1971); and A Sound of Trumpets (1971). The author Naomi Mitchison said of McLean that "Nobody handles Gaelic speech and thought better... and few get going better with anger and action." Some of his books have been translated into German. Hill of the Red Fox was made into a TV mini-series by BBC Scotland in 1975.

He received awards for the following works:

- The Islander (1962), Niven Award
- The Glasshouse (1968), Arts Council Award

== Sources ==
- Obituary ('Skye dignity and socialism'), by Brian Wilson, The Guardian, 2 November 1989.
