= Unnamed EP =

Unnamed

EP by Fuck the Facts
- Released: February 21, 2010
- Recorded: November 14 – November 28, 2009
- Genre: Grindcore, death metal
- Length: 11:41
- Label: Independent

Fuck the Facts chronology
The Wreaking (2008)	Unnamed (2010)	Disgorge Mexico: The DVD (2010)

Professional ratings
Review scores
Source	Rating
Blabbermouth.net	8/10 stars

Unnamed EP is the fourth EP by Canadian grindcore band Fuck the Facts. The EP was released on vinyl on February 21, 2010, and digitally on February 28, 2010. The EP is limited to 500 copies on vinyl (400 on black, 100 on clear), and is also available as a digital download. In 2014 the band found some extra covers leftover from the vinyl, rather than throw them out they decided to burn the ep to CD-Rs and sell them via Facebook. Only 7 were made.

== Track listing ==
All lyrics are written by Fuck the Facts; all music is composed by Fuck the Facts.

No.	Title	Length
1.	"Unnamed" (titled as such on the digital download, but represented by blank space on the artwork)	1:49
2.	"Loss Upon Loss"	2:24
3.	"Wake"	1:42
4.	"Time Is a Dictator"	1:22
5.	"La Tete Hors de L'eau" (rerecorded, originally released on Overseas Connection)	3:38
6.	"Doghead" (rerecorded, originally released on Mullet Fever)	0:36

== Personnel ==
- Topon Das – guitar
- Mathieu Vilandré – drums, guitar
- Mel Mongeon – vocals, artwork
- Marc Bourgon – bass, vocals

=== Additional ===
- Dave Sarazin – drum recording
- Craig Boychuk – mixing
- Alan Douches – mastering
- Johnny Ibay – guest guitar solo ("Unnamed")
- Matt Connell – guest vocals ("Doghead")

== Recording ==
The drums were recorded on November 15, 2009, at Raven Street Studios by Dave Sarazin, while the band recorded the rest at Super Pro Studio in Gatineau between November 16 and 28. Craig Boychuk mixed the album at CB Audio, and Alan Douches mastered the album at West West Side in December.
