= Collection of Splits 2002–2004 =

Compilation album by Fuck the Facts
- Released: April 28, 2006
- Recorded: 2002–2004
- Genre: Death metal, grindcore, electrogrind
- Label: Great White North

Fuck the Facts chronology
Legacy of Hopelessness (2005)	Collection of Splits 2002–2004 (2006)	Stigmata High-Five (2006)

Professional ratings
Review scores
Source	Rating
Metal Mayhem UK	6.5/10 stars
Skyline Press	7.5/10 stars

Collection of Splits 2002–2004 is a compilation album by Canadian grindcore band Fuck the Facts. It was released in the spring of 2006 on Great White North Records.

The compilation contains all of the tracks (minus live and bonus tracks) from the splits released between Backstabber Etiquette and Legacy of Hopelessness. It was also packed with enhanced MP3 tracks from some of the earlier splits and other oddities. Topon Das had expressed an interest in releasing a compilation after he realized that many fans were unable to acquire the actual splits, due to their limited pressings and many of the labels being overseas. This compilation made the band's material from these splits more accessible.

== Track listing ==
All tracks are written by Fuck the Facts, except where indicated.

Audio Tracks
No.	Title	Writer(s)	Original release	Length
1.	"Secret Asian"		Split with Subcut	1:31
2.	"Another Living Night"		Split with Subcut	2:32
3.	"No One Remembered Who Started"		Split with Subcut	2:41
4.	"Medicated Like a Motherfucker"		Overseas Connection	0:48
5.	"This Means Nothing"		Overseas Connection	1:22
6.	"La Tete Hors De L'Eau"		Overseas Connection	3:24
7.	"Born to Kill Live to Thrill"		Overseas Connection	1:02
8.	"Unburden"		Overseas Connection	2:36
9.	"Ventriloquist Complex"		Overseas Connection	2:24
10.	"Devastator"	Godflesh	Split with Feeble Minded	3:46
11.	"Terminal Skullet"		Split with Feeble Minded	2:45
12.	"Fingers with Candy Tips"		Split with Feeble Minded	2:07
13.	"Don't Call Japanese Hardcore Jap Core"	Anal Cunt	Split with Feeble Minded	0:36
14.	"Leper Accountant"		Split with Feeble Minded	2:02
15.	"Merdarahta"		Split with Feeble Minded	4:21
16.	"The Jaquio"		Split with Feeble Minded	2:28
17.	"Whisper Dependency (Video Game Version)"		Split with Feeble Minded	2:05
18.	"The Transformation"		Split with Sylvester Staline	0:46
19.	"Confession"	Unholy Grave	Split with Sylvester Staline	1:01
20.	"Empty Words"	Death	Split with Sylvester Staline	5:03
21.	"What I Am"		Split with Sylvester Staline	1:04

All tracks are written by Topon Das, Tim Audette and Mel Mongeon, except where noted.

Enhanced Content
No.	Title	Writer(s)	Original release	Length
1.	"Mindloss"		Split with P.O.T	4:54
2.	"Fighting Fashion"		Split with P.O.T	2:50
3.	"Jack Hammers"		Split with P.O.T	2:52
4.	"Old Woman Undressing"		Split with P.O.T	1:17
5.	"Just Like the First Time We Met"		Split with P.O.T	1:35
6.	"Guinness Madness"		Split with P.O.T	0:46
7.	"Washed Up"	Topon Das	Split with Manherringbone	2:52
8.	"Underwater Air-Tank Misery"	Topon Das	Split with Manherringbone	5:30
9.	"Larium Nights"	Topon Das	Split with Manherringbone	7:37
10.	"Phonopobia"	Topon Das	Split with Manherringbone	3:39
11.	"You Will Crash You Will Die"	Topon Das	Split with Manherringbone	2:11
12.	"How Much for That Doggy in the Window"		Split with Conure	4:08
13.	"Slough"		Split with Conure	2:53
14.	"Hate Is Our Religion"		Split with Conure	4:42
15.	"A.M. Noise 1"		Split with Conure	2:58
16.	"Fear Drives a Honda"		Split with Conure	1:23
17.	"Fuckin' Useless"		Split with Conure	4:50
18.	"How Much for That Doggy in the Window (Reprocessed by Sindrome)"		Previously unreleased	5:30
19.	"Empty Words (Remix by Matt Connell)"	Death	Previously unreleased	5:09
20.	"Medicated Like a Motherfucker" (video)	Created by Topon Das	Previously unreleased	1:02

== Personnel ==
- Topon Das – guitar, bass, keyboards, samples, recording, mixing, mastering
- Mel Mongeon – vocals, artwork
- Matt Connell – drums, recording, mixing, mastering
- Jean-Philippe Latour – remastering

=== Additional Musicians ===
- Dave Menard – guitar on "Secret Asian," "Another Living Night" and "No One Remembered Who Started"
- Tim Audette – guitar on "Confession," "Empty Words" and "What I Am"
- Mike Alexander (Head Hits Concrete, Putrescence) – vocals on "Another Living Night"
- Wiande (Sergent Slaughter) – vocals on "This Means Nothing"
- Swiz (Electrocutionerdz) – samples on "Unburden" and "Ventriloquist Complex"

== Release ==
Due to the limited availability of many of their splits, Fuck the Facts decided to release this compilation in the hopes that fans could get their music more readily. Shortly after the release of this album, Great White North Records folded. 500 copies were made, but it is suspected that many were lost while trying to get across the border for distribution. As a result, the initial intent to increase availability was unsuccessful. However, in July 2007, Galy Records re-released the collection, making it readily available again.
