= Great White North =

Great White North may refer to:

- The Great White North, a 1928 early sound feature film
- "Great White North", a recurring SCTV sketch featuring Bob and Doug McKenzie
- The Great White North (album), a comedy album by Bob and Doug McKenzie (Rick Moranis and Dave Thomas)
- Great White North Records, former Canadian independent record label
- This Great White North, a weekly radio show featuring independent Canadian music on KOOP-FM 91.7 in Austin, Texas

== See also ==
- Canada, a country in North America
- Arctic, the northernmost part of Earth
