= Live in Whitby =

Live album by Fuck the Facts
- Released: July 26, 2010
- Recorded: 2009
- Genres: Grindcore, death metal
- Length: 32:55
- Label: Self-released

Fuck the Facts chronology
St. Jean Baptiste 2010 (2010)	Live in Whitby (2010)	Die Miserable (2011)

Live in Whitby is a live album by Canadian grindcore band Fuck the Facts. It was recorded during a live performance on April 11, 2009, in Whitby, Ontario and released July 27, 2010.

== Release ==
Live in Whitby was released in two formats: a cassette limited to fifty-three copies, and a free or "pay what you want" digital format. The cassette was released on the night of July 26 at midnight while the download was made available twenty-four hours later on July 27 at midnight. The download included a full set from the band as well as live photos and posters. The cassette version, which was handmade by the band, included other bonus content that was not available on the digital download. The release was dedicated to late artist and musician Michal Majewski, who designed the cover artwork.

Recording

The album was recorded live in Whitby, Ontario on April 11, 2009, at a venue called The Wing Shack by Dave Sheldon. Supporting acts were Heaps of Dead, The Unborn Dead, and F.A.T.O. The recording was initially intended to be part of a DVD that never materialized. However, the band was impressed with the audio and decided to release it instead.

Artwork

Artist Michal Majewski designed the poster for the Whitby show and also performed that night with F.A.T.O. Majewski died three months later on July 11, 2009. The design he used ended up becoming a T-shirt design that Fuck the Facts released. Ultimately, his artwork was used as the cover of the Live in Whitby release.

== Track listing ==
No.	Title	Length
1.	"Absence and Despite"	3:35
2.	"The Storm"	5:44
3.	"Kelowna"	2:19
4.	"Everyone Is Robbing the Dead"	2:10
5.	"The Sound of Your Smashed Head"	2:23
6.	"La Culture Du Faux"	4:00
7.	"The Pile of Flesh You Carry"	2:41
8.	"Sleepless"	5:08
9.	"La Tête Hors De L'eau"	4:55

== Personnel ==
Fuck the Facts

- Topon Das – guitar, samples
- Mel Mongeon – vocals
- Mathieu Vilandre – drums, samples
- Marc Bourgon – bass, vocals
- Johnny Ibay – guitar

Other

- Mel Mongeon – layout, design
- Michal Majewski – cover artwork
- Dave Sheldon – recording, mixing, mastering

== Reception ==
Professional ratings
Review scores
Source	Rating
Hellbound	9/10 stars

Jason Wellwood of Canadian webzine Hellbound.ca praised the recording's high sound quality and the band's no-nonsense performance. He suggested that it was an excellent example of the band's intense live performances.
