= List of people known as the Rich =

The epithet "the Rich" may refer to:

== Aristocrats ==
- Adalbert II, Margrave of Tuscany (c. 875–915)
- Guntram the Rich (c. 920–973), a count in Breisgau (now Germany), possible progenitor of the House of Habsburg
- Kjotve the Rich, late 9th century king of Agder, a petty kingdom in southern Norway
- Louis IX, Duke of Bavaria (1417–1479)
- Mary of Burgundy (1457–1482), Duchess regnant of Burgundy, first wife of Maximilian I, later Holy Roman Emperor
- Otto, Count of Ballenstedt (died 1123), the first Ascanian prince to call himself Count of Anhalt, briefly named Duke of Saxony
- Otto II, Margrave of Meissen (1125–1190)
- William I, Count of Nassau-Siegen (1487–1559)
- William, Duke of Jülich-Cleves-Berg (1516–1592), brother of Anne of Cleves, briefly Queen of England

== Other ==
- Jakob Fugger (1459–1525), German merchant, mining entrepreneur and banker
- William Jennens (1701–1798), "the richest commoner in England"

== See also ==
- Abraham the Poor (died 372), Egyptian hermit and saint
- List of people known as the Miser
