= USS Missouri =

Four ships of the United States Navy have been named USS Missouri in honor of the state or river of Missouri:

- USS Missouri (1841), a sidewheel frigate launched in 1841 and destroyed by fire in August 1843
- USS Missouri (BB-11), a Maine-class battleship in service from 1900 to 1922.
- USS Missouri (BB-63), an Iowa-class battleship in service (variably) from 1944 to 1992; site of the official Japanese surrender of World War II; now a floating war memorial at Naval Base Pearl Harbor, Hawaii
- USS Missouri (SSN-780), a Virginia-class submarine commissioned in 2010

== See also ==
- CSS Missouri, a Confederate States Navy river gunboat based primarily on the Red River during the American Civil War.
- SS Missouri, several merchant ships with this name
