= Missouri (band) =

American rock band

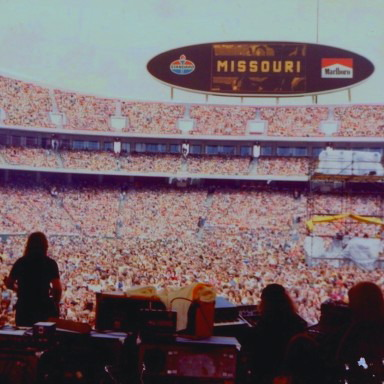

Background information
- Origin: Kansas City, Missouri, U.S.
- Genres: Southern rock, blues rock, hard rock
- Years active: 1977–1984, 1994–1995, 2019-present
- Labels: Panama Records, Polydor Records, Cow Town Records
- Members: Lane Turner; Bill Larson; Randall Platt; Frank Drummond; Rusty Crewse; Dean Foltz
- Past members: Ron West; Alan Cohen; Jeff Littrell; Dan Billings; Webb Waterman; Rob Brennan
- Website: missouriband.com

Missouri is an American rock band from Kansas City, Missouri, known primarily for the song "Movin' On" released in 1977. The founding line up of Missouri consisted of Ron West, Alan Cohen, Lane Turner, and Bill Larson. After a significant hiatus, Lane Turner and Bill Larson returned to playing live under the blessings of founder Ron West in 2019, recruiting Rusty Crewse (guitar, backing vocals) and Dean Foltz (bass, backing vocals, keyboards). Randall Platt rejoined the touring lineup in 2022 along with lead singer Frank Drummond.

== History ==
From 1964 to 1974, Ron West (né Hodgden) was part of a well-remembered Kansas City band, The Chesmann/ Chesmann Square, with his two brothers Gary and Steve, accompanied by Dave Huffines and the late Jimmy McAllister on guitars. Heavily inspired by British Invasion groups, the band played both live covers and recorded original studio material. Gary West was also a member of the band Shooting Star, which scored several modest AOR hits in the late 1970s and early 1980s.

Led by singer and guitarist Ron West, the band's self-titled first album was released in 1977 on a label called Panama Records. Even though Panama was an independent label, the band garnered substantial airplay on American FM AOR radio stations, specifically with the track "Movin On". Missouri's first gig was opening for Firefall in Emporia, Kansas. Missouri was the opening act for Willie Nelson's Fourth of July Picnic at Arrowhead Stadium, Kansas City, Missouri, July 1, 1978. Missouri toured nationally with many major label acts such as Ted Nugent and Golden Earring, among many others.

A second album, "Welcome Two Missouri", was released on the larger and international Polydor label in 1979, including a re-recorded version of "Movin' On" minus the original intro. By this time two of the original line up had dropped out. No further recordings were issued except a repackaging of recordings from the previous albums called The Best of Missouri. Missouri songs are available on iTunes.

Ron West and Bill Larson reunited in 1994 with new members for tours in 1994 and 1995.

In 2019 drummer Bill Larson and guitarist Lane Turner (both founding members) reformed the group with Ron West's blessing, adding Rusty Crewse (guitars, backing vocals), Dean Foltz (bass, backing vocals, keyboards) and lead vocalist Stephen Cambell Beckinger. The group began to play concerts in 2019 including an appearance at KSHE's classic rock Pig Roast in August. The pandemic slowed the concert business down to a halt in 2020.

Ron West died on May 2, 2020, after battling Progressive Supranuclear Palsy (PSP) for six years; the band announced his demise via their Facebook page.

In mid-2022, Frank Drummond joined the band as their new lead singer. On October 1, 2022, at a concert in Richmond, Missouri, the band was joined on stage by original keyboardist Randall Platt for several songs. At another concert in Kansas City in early 2023, Platt joined the band again; this time, playing the entire show.

== Members ==
- Ron West - guitars, vocals (founding member)
- Alan Cohen - bass (founding member)
- Lane Turner - lead guitars (founding member)
- Bill Larson - drums (founding member; returned for 1994-1995 reunion)
- Randall Platt - keyboards (Randall joined the band near the completion of their first album)
- Jeff Littrell - drums (replaced Bill Larson)
- Webb Waterman - lead guitar (replaced Lane Turner)
- Dan Billings - drums (replaced Jeff Littrell)
- Rob Brennan - drums (replaced Dan Billings)

== Discography ==
1. Missouri, Panama Records (1977)
2. Welcome Two Missouri, Polydor Records (1979)
3. The Best of Missouri, Cow Town Records (2003)
