= Head Hits Concrete =

Canadian musical group

- Origin: Winnipeg, Manitoba, Canada
- Genre: Grindcore
- Years active: 1999 – present
- Label: G7 Welcoming Committee
- Members: Mike Alexander; Darcy Bunio; Brad Skibinsky
- Past members: Jeff Byckal; Justin Ludwar; Craig Boychuk
- Website: headhitsconcrete.n3.net

Head Hits Concrete is a Canadian political grindcore band that formed in April 1999 in Winnipeg. Between 1999 and 2004 the band recorded a cassette demo, 3 EPs and split records with My Minds Mine and Bodies Lay Broken. Head Hits Concrete went on extended hiatus in 2004, but reformed for a show with Brutal Truth in 2010. The band has toured briefly since that date, and released the Hollowed Out Human Husk EP on Mercy of Slumber Records in March 2013.

Prior to going on hiatus, Head Hits Concrete played numerous shows in Winnipeg, including annual extreme music festival Arsonfest, and embarked on one American and one Canadian tour with Fuck the Facts. The band collectively decided to pursue other projects after returning from their western Canadian tour in 2004. Those projects include instrumentalists Prague (Bunio, Boychuk), Putrescence (Alexander), Kursk (Skibinsky), Wolbachia (Skibinsky), Big Trouble in Little China (Bunio, original guitarist Byckal) and L'viv (Boychuk). These projects are in various states of activity.

== Discography ==
- 2000 – Mitakuye Oyasin demo CS
- 2001 – Head Hits Concrete 7" (Sounds of Betrayal Records)
- 2001 – Split 10" with My Minds Mine (Sound of Betrayal Records)
- 2002 – Hope Fear and the Terror of Dreams 7" (Intolerant Messiah Records)
- 2004 – Split 7" with Bodies Lay Broken (One Percent Records)
- 2004 – Thy Kingdom Come Undone CD (Crimes against Humanity Records)
- 2004 – Limited edition tour 7" (Plastic Airlines Records)
- 2007 – Thy Kingdom Come Undone (+9) CD (G7 Welcoming Committee Records)
- 2013 – Hollowed Out Human Husk 7" (Mercy of Slumber Records)

== Personnel ==
- Mike Alexander (Swallowing Shit, Putrescence)
- Darcy Bunio (Prague, Big Trouble in Little China)
- Brad Skibinsky (Kursk, Wolbachia)

=== Former members ===
- Jeff Byckal (Big Trouble in Little China)
- Justin Ludwar
- Craig Boychuk (L'viv)
