= Misery Index =

Misery Index can refer to:

== Economics ==
- Misery index (economics), adding the unemployment rate to the inflation rate

== Entertainment ==
- Misery Index (band), an American death metal band from Baltimore
- Misery Index (album), a 1997 album by grindcore band Assück
- The Misery Index (TV series), an American television series
- The Misery Index: Notes from the Plague Years, a 2006 album by Boysetsfire
