= List of television programmes produced by BBC Scotland =

This is a list of television programmes that have been produced by or for BBC Scotland in the United Kingdom.

A list of BBC programmes nationally can be found at List of television programmes broadcast by the BBC and the BBC's children's television programmes can be found at List of BBC children's television programmes.

== Comedy ==
- Two Doors Down (2013-)
- Badults (2013–2014)
- Baxter On... (1964)
- Burnistoun (2009–2012)
- Chewin' the Fat (1999–2002, Hogmanay specials until 2005)
- City Lights (1984–92)
- Dear Green Place (2007–2008)
- Elaine (1999–2001)
- Gary: Tank Commander (2009–2012)
- Happy Hollidays (2009)
- The Karen Dunbar Show (2003–2006)
- A Kick Up the Eighties (1981–84)
- Laugh??? I Nearly Paid My Licence Fee (1984)
- Legit (2006–2007)
- Lex Again (1970)
- Life of Riley (2009–2011)
- Limmy's Show (2010–2013)
- Mountain Goats (2015)
- Mrs. Brown's Boys (2011–)
- Naked Video (1986–1991)
- Overnite Express (2000)
- Personal Affairs (2009)
- Pulp Video (1995–1996)
- Rab C. Nesbitt (1988–2014)
- Scot Squad (2013–)
- Scotch and Wry (1978–1992)
- The Stanley Baxter show (1963–1971)
- Still Game (2002–2007, 2016–2019)
- Time for Baxter (1972)
- VideoGaiden (2005–2008)
- The World of Chic Murray (1976)

== Current affairs ==
- Agenda (1981–1984)
- Axiom (1993)
- BBC Scotland Investigates, formerly Frontline Scotland (1993–present)
- Cause for Concern (1980s)
- Checkpoint (1970s–1980s)
- Current Account (1968–1983)
- Debate Night (2019–present)
- Eòrpa (1993–present)
- Holyrood Live (1999–2009)
- Left Right and Centre (1985–1992)
- Newsnight Scotland (1999–2014)
- Open to Question (1987–1993)
- Politics Scotland (2003–present)
- Public Account (1975–1978)
- Reporting Scotland (1968–present)
- Scotland 2016 (2014–2016)
- Scottish Lobby (1992–1999)
- The Nine (2019–present)
- Words with Wark (1994–1998)

== Children's ==
- 50/50 (1997–2005)
- Balamory (2002–2005, 2026-present)
- Bits and Bobs (2002-2005)
- Breakout (1991)
- By the Way (1992)
- Carrie and David's Popshop (2008)
- Children's BBC Scotland (1991–2000)
- Class Tracks (1992)
- Copycats (2009–2016)
- CTVI (1986)
- Dòtaman (1985–2000)
- Down on the Farm (2015–2023)
- Fully Booked (1995–1999)
- Get 100 (2007–2009)
- Go For X/Go TV (1992–1993)
- Hedz (2007–2010)
- The House that Joe Built (1984)
- Hububb (1997–2001)
- Huntingtower (1977)
- The Ice Cream Van (1992)
- Katie Morag (2013-2015)
- The Kids Are Alright (2008)
- Joe & Co (1983)
- LazyTown Extra (2008)
- The McMeanies (1989)
- Me Too! (2006–2007)
- Megamag (1993–1996)
- Newsround Scotland (1999)
- Nina and the Neurons (2007–2015)
- Molly and Mack (2018-2022)
- Over the Moon with Mr Boom (1990–1996)
- Raven (2002–2010) (2017-2018)
- Shoebox Zoo (2004–2005)
- Squeak! (2002)
- The Singing Kettle (1989–1993)
- Up for it! (1997–98)
- The Untied Shoelaces Show (1982-1984)
- UKOOL / UKOOL Live (1999–2001)

== Dramas ==
- The Borderers (1968–1970)
- Bothwell (1979)
- The Bodyguard (2018–)
- Case Histories (2011–2013)
- The Crow Road (1996)
- Donvan Quick (2000)
- Doom Castle (1980)
- Down among the boys (1993)
- Dr. Finlay's Casebook (1962–1971)
- The Dunroamin' Rising (1988)
- The Flight of the Heron (1976)
- The Haggard Falcon (1974)
- Hamish Macbeth (1995–1997)
- Hen Night Tensions (1993)
- The Hill of the Red Fox (1975)
- Hope Springs (2009)
- Just Another Saturday (1975)
- Just a Boys' Game (1979)
- Just Your Luck (1972)
- Kidnapped (1975)
- Lip Service (2010–2012)
- Looking After Jo Jo (1998)
- The Lost Tribe (1980)
- The Mad Death (1983)
- The Master of Ballantrae (1962)
- The McFlannels (1958)
- The Miser (1979)
- Monarch of the Glen (2000–2005)
- The New Road (1973)
- The Nightmare Man (1981)
- The Omega Factor (1979)
- One of Us (2016)
- River City (2002–2026)
- Rob Roy (1976)
- Scarlet and the Black (1965)
- Scotch on the Rocks (1975)
- Sea of Souls (2004–2007)
- Shetland (2013–present)
- The Ship 1990
- Shoot for the sun 1986
- Sunset Song (1971)
- Sutherland's Law (1973–1976)
- Takin' Over the Asylum (1994)
- Three Ring Circus (1961)
- Tinsel Town (2000–2001)
- Tutti Frutti (1987)
- The View from Daniel Pike (1971)
- Wallander (2008–2016) (a co-production between Left Bank Pictures and Yellow Bird)
- Waterloo Road (2006–2015)
- The Workings of a Slab Boy (1979)
- Your Cheatin' heart (1990)

== Documentaries ==
- BBC Scotland 75 Years (1998)
- Breathing Space (1974–1976)
- The Cheviot, the Stag and the Black, Black Oil (1974)
- Culloden (1964)
- Fight for Clydeside (1971)
- Flying Scotsmen aviation in Scotland (1976)
- The Food Programme (TV series 1975–1977, produced in Scotland, subsequently went to Radio 4)
- Lilybank - the fourth world (1976)
- Power of Scotland - Chris Baur reports(1978)
- The Queen's Realm - The Lion's Share (1977)
- Race to the North (1978)
- The Scheme (2010–2011)
- Secret Society (1987)
- The Special Unit (1975)
- To The Land Where Glaciers Grow (1976)
- The Visit: The Boy David (1988)
- Watching Ourselves: 60 Years of TV in Scotland (2012/2013)
- Who Are the SNP?(1978)
- Yes, But What Do You Do all Winter? (1975)

== Features ==
- The Adventure Show (2005–2025)
- Advice Shop (1987–1992), made in conjunction with other BBC offices
- Artworks Scotland (2004–present)
- Bartok Centenary (1981)
- The Beechgrove Garden (1978–present)
- The Bigger picture
- Castle in the Country (2005–present)
- The Culture Show (2006–2015)
- The Dark Side of Fame with Piers Morgan (2008), not a main production
- EX-S (1992–2002)
- Film 2015 (1972–2018), not a main production
- First Person Singular (1970–1975)
- The Garden Party (1988)
- Grandstand from Scotland (1961–2006)
- A History of Scotland (2008–2009)
- Hogmanay Live (1991–present)
- Landward (1976–present)
- The Mart (2016)
- The Mountain (2015)
- My Kind of Music (1980s)
- Restoration (2003–2009)
- Rugby Special from Scotland (1990–1994)
- Scotland on Film (2004–present)
- Sounds of Scotland (1976)
- Spectrum (1970s)
- Sportscene (1975–present)
- Sportsreel from Scotland (1964–1975)
- Sports Special from Scotland (1959–1964)
- T in the Park (1999–2016)
- This Time Tomorrow (2008)
- TRNSMT (2017–present)
- You can't fire me, I'm famous! (2006–2007)

== Entertainment ==
- Caledonia MacBrains (2001–2002)
- Catchword (1985–1995)
- Comedy Connections (2003–2008)
- Double Bill (1982)
- Friday Night with Dougie Donnelly (1983–1984)
- Movie Connections (2007–2009)
- No Stilettos (1993)
- Offside (1998–2007)
- A Question of Genius (2009–2010)
- Super Scot (1983–1992)
- The Weakest Link (2000–2012), (2021- present)
- Richard Osman's House of Games (2017–)
