= Disgorge Mexico: The DVD =

Video by Fuck the Facts
- Released: May 11, 2010
- Recorded: Concert; August 2, 2008; Soundtrack; August 6th–17th (instruments); November 2007(vocals)
- Genres: Death metal, grindcore
- Label: Handshake Inc. / Nictophobia Films

Fuck the Facts chronology
Unnamed EP (2010)	Disgorge Mexico: The DVD (2010)	St. Jean Baptiste 2010 (2010)

Disgorge Mexico: The DVD is the first video release by Canadian grindcore band Fuck the Facts. The DVD has two parts. The first part is a multi-camera recording of the August 2, 2008 concert in which the band performed their then-newest album Disgorge Mexico live in its entirety. The second part is Disgorge, Mexico: The Movie, a film made by Canadian filmmaker David Hall that is set to the studio recordings of Disgorge Mexico. It includes all of the selections from the album except the first track "Borders."

The film is described by Hall as "a substance abuse art house riff on the destructive and volatile nature of love." The film follows a woman's strange journey with a violent, hallucinatory depiction. On November 5, Metal Injection debuted a clip from the film featuring the song "Kelowna." A quote included with the clip provided information about the content of the film:

Blood, crotch, cult, barns and snow. A young woman finds herself in Disgorge, Mexico for the first time. How her hands came to be covered in blood she does not know. She walks a few steps then panics as four beautiful people wearing white, hooded robes descend on her body to debauch her soul to fuckdust. She is one of them now.

— David Hall

== Track listing ==
All lyrics are written by Mélanie Mongeon (except "Dead End" by Mélanie Mongeon and Topon Das); all music is composed by Fuck the Facts with assistance where indicated.

Live Disgorge
No.	Title	Music	Length
1.	"Borders"
2.	"No Return"
3.	"Absence and Despite"	Steve Chartier
4.	"Kelowna"
5.	"As Empires Expand and Collapse"	Chartier
6.	"Dead End"
7.	"Driving Through Fallen Cities"	Matt Connell/Tim Audette
8.	"La Culture Du Faux"
9.	"State of Panic"
10.	"No Place for Failure"
11.	"The Storm"	Chartier
12.	"Apathy Is a Karma Killer"
13.	"Golden Age"
14.	"The Pile of Flesh You Carry"
15.	"Sleepless"	Chartier

Disgorge, Mexico: The Movie
No.	Title	Music	Length
1.	"No Return"
2.	"Absence and Despite"	Steve Chartier
3.	"Kelowna"
4.	"As Empires Expand and Collapse"	Chartier
5.	"Dead End"
6.	"Driving Through Fallen Cities"	Matt Connell/Tim Audette
7.	"La Culture Du Faux"
8.	"State of Panic"
9.	"No Place for Failure"
10.	"The Storm"	Chartier
11.	"Apathy Is a Karma Killer"
12.	"Golden Age"
13.	"The Pile of Flesh You Carry"
14.	"Sleepless"	Chartier

Bonus Disc
No.	Title	Length
1.	"Live in Hamilton, ON @ The Casbah May 8th 2009"
2.	"Live in Amsterdam, Holland @ Stubnitz March 16th 2009"
3.	"Metallica Fridays With Psyopus August 2008"
4.	"Live in Arlington Heights, IL @ Knights Of Columbus August 22nd 2008"
5.	"Western Canadian Tour June 2008"
6.	"Live in Victoria, BC @ Logans Pub June 11th 2008"
7.	"Disgorge BBQ"
8.	"Live Disgorge Trailer"
9.	"Disgorge, Mexico: The Movie Trailer"
10.	"Vs. the Dead Trailer"

"Metallica Fridays with Psyopus" is a performance of two Metallica songs ("Master of Puppets" and "Creeping Death") by members from Fuck the Facts and Pysopus:

From Fuck the Facts

- Mathieu Vilandré – vocals
- Marc Bourgon – vocals
- Johnny Ibay – guitar

From Psyopus

- Mike Horn – bass
- Jason Bauers – drums
- Chris Arp – guitar

== Release ==
The film was released by Handshake Inc. and Nictophobia Films in conjunction with the band who produced the actual DVDs. It was limited to 500 copies, and included a bonus DVD with the first 100 copies.

== Reception ==
Professional ratings
Review scores
Source	Rating
Blabbermouth	8.5/10 stars
PureGrainAudio	8/10 stars

Blabbermouth gave the film an 8.5 out of 10, noting the quality of live performance as well as the disturbing nature of Disgorge, Mexico: The Movie.
