= List of people known as the Miser =

The Miser is an epithet for the following people:

- John Elwes (politician) (1714–1789), British MP and noted eccentric, suggested as an inspiration of the Dickens character Ebenezer Scrooge
- William Jennens (1701–1798), English reclusive financier
- Yossele the Holy Miser or the Miser, 17th century very wealthy Polish Jew who concealed his donations to the poor

== See also ==
- Jemmy Wood (1756–1836), owner of the Gloucester Old Bank, known as "The Gloucester Miser"
- List of people known as the Rich
