= The Wreaking =

EP by Fuck the Facts
- Released: November 29, 2008
- Recorded: October–November, 2005
- Genre: Grindcore
- Label: Self Released

Fuck the Facts chronology
Disgorge Mexico (2008)	The Wreaking (2008)	Unnamed EP (2010)

The Wreaking is the third EP by Canadian grindcore band Fuck the Facts. The EP was released on November 29, 2008, via the band's MySpace page and was strictly limited to 19 copies. When the 7" vinyl copies of the split with Pleasant Valley were sold out, there were still some copies of the sleeve, so the band created this EP.

It comprises songs from a few different sources. The first two tracks are pre-production versions of songs found on Stigmata High-Five. They were originally released on vinyl splits with Mesrine and Pleasant Valley. The other songs are live songs originally intended to be released on a split with Mincing Fury on Burning Dogma Records, however, the owner of the label went to jail before it could be released.

"Taken From The Nest" and "The Wreaking" were recorded in Ottawa by Matt Connell in October and November 2005 respectively. The live tracks were recorded at a show on November 13, 2005, at Maverick's in Ottawa with Exhumed, Averse Sefira and Eclipse Eternal.

== Track listing ==
Music and lyrics by Fuck the Facts.

1. "Taken from the Nest"
2. "The Wreaking"
3. "Horizon" (live)
4. "The Burning Side" (live)
5. "23-17-41" (live)
6. "La Tete Hors de L’eau" (live)
7. "Unburden" (live)

== Personnel ==
- Topon Das – guitar
- Mel Mongeon – vocals
- Mathieu Vilandré – guitar
- Steve Chartier – bass
- Tim Olsen – drums
- Matt Connell – recording
