= SS Missouri =

A number of steamships have been named Missouri, including –

- SS Missouri (1855), built by Caird & Co, 2,259 GRT
- SS Missouri (1888), built by William Gray & Co Ltd, 2,845 GRT
- SS Missouri (1903), built by Maryland Steel Co, 7,924 GRT
- SS Missouri (1904), built by Chicago Shipbuilding Co, 2,434 GRT.
- SS Missouri (1913), built by Harland & Wolff, 4,697 GRT
- SS Missouri (1920), built by Chanteliers & Ateliers de St Nazaire, 6,773 GRT
- SS Missouri (1942), built by William Gray & Co Ltd, 7,042 GRT

See also

- USS Missouri
