= Missouri (album) =

Studio album by Missouri
- Released: August 1977
- Studio: Sound Valley Studios (Kansas City, MO)
- Genre: Rock
- Label: Panama Records (PRS-1022)
- Producer: Ron West, Chris Fritz

Missouri is the self-titled debut album by American rock band Missouri released in August 1977 on Panama Records. It was on Billboard magazine's recommended list. Their first single, "Movin' On" received the most airplay. Other popular songs included "Really Love You" and "Mystic Lady". The album was produced by Ron West and Chris Fritz.

== Track listing ==
- All songs written and arranged by Ron West.

Side I

1. Intro 1:06
2. Movin' On 3:32
3. Got That Fever 3:20
4. I'm Still Tryin' 4:12
5. You're Alright 3:02
6. Really Love You 3:32

Side II

1. Hold Me 3:05
2. I Know It's Love 3:05
3. Come On Move 2:52
4. Goin' Home 2:25
5. Mystic Lady 5:18

== Personnel ==
- Ron West - Lead Vocals, Rhythm Guitar, Keyboards, Harmonica
- Lane Turner - Lead Guitar
- Alan Cohen - Bass, Vocals
- Bill Larson - Drums

== Production ==
- Produced by Ron West and Chris Fritz
- Recorded and Engineered by John Mosely
- Mixed by Paul Ratajczak
- Mastered by Carol Hibbs
- Production Assistant - Gary Hodgden
- Jacket Design - Jeff Kirtley
- Photography - Mark Lawhon
