= Die Miserable =

Studio album by Fuck the Facts
- Released: October 11, 2011
- Genres: Death metal, grindcore
- Length: 35:19
- Label: Relapse
- Producer: Fuck the Facts

Fuck the Facts chronology
Live in Whitby (2010)	Die Miserable (2011)	Misery (2011)

Die Miserable is the ninth album by Canadian grindcore band Fuck the Facts. It was released on October 11, 2011, through Relapse Records.

== Track listing ==
No.	Title	Length
1.	"Drift"	3:59
2.	"Cold Hearted"	4:37
3.	"Lifeless"	3:05
4.	"Census Blank"	7:25
5.	"Alone"	4:11
6.	"Die Miserable"	1:35
7.	"A Coward's Existence"	4:10
8.	"95"	6:17

Bonus tracks
No.	Title	Length
1.	"October 26th"	21:05
2.	"Piano for Cowards"	1:51
3.	"Power Violent"	4:06
4.	"So Long"	1:04

== Personnel ==
=== Fuck the Facts ===
- Mel Mongeon – vocals
- Topon Das – guitars
- Johnny Ibay – guitars
- Marc Bourgon – bass, backing vocals
- Mathieu "Vil" Vilandre – drums

=== Production ===
- Mel Mongeon – artwork
- Craig Boychuk – mixing
- Alan Douches – mastering

== Release history ==
- October 11, 2011 (iTunes)
- October 11, 2011 (North America)
- October 17, 2011 (UK)
- October 21, 2011 (Germany)
- October 24, 2011 (Europe)
