= Live Damage (Fuck the Facts album) =

Live album by Fuck the Facts
- Released: 2003
- Recorded: September 9, 2001; April 19, 2002; December 18, 2002
- Genre: Grindcore, death metal
- Label: Smell the Stench

Fuck the Facts chronology
Backstabber Etiquette (2003)	Live Damage (2003)	Legacy of Hopelessness (2005)

Live Damage is the first live album by Canadian grindcore band Fuck the Facts. It was released in 2003 on Australian DIY label Smell the Stench on cassette only. Many of the live recordings can be found on other splits that Fuck the Facts has released over the years. The A side of the tape is the first show while the last 2 shows are on the B side.

== Track listing ==
=== December 18th 2002 in Halifax, NS at The Pavilion ===
1. "All Hands on Deck"
2. "Don't Call My Slammin' Outfit Cool, White Bread!"
3. "Instigation"
4. "Smokin' a Fatty"
5. "The Transformation"
6. "Ballet Addict"
7. "Whisper Dependency"
8. "What I Am"
9. "The Burning Side"
10. "Another Living Night"
11. "23 17 41"
12. "Released"

=== April 19th 2002 in Ottawa, ON at The Underground ===
1. "Released"
2. "Whisper Dependency"
3. "The Burning Side"
4. "Yngwie vs. FTF"
5. "Roach"

=== September 9th 2001 in Ottawa, ON at The Underground ===
1. "Roach"
2. "Perpetrator"
3. "Lack of Imagination"
4. "Smokin' a Fatty"
5. "The Burning Side"
6. "Whisper Dependency"
7. "Released"
8. "Marsha"

== Personnel ==
- Tim Audette – guitar
- Brent Christoff – vocals (18–25)
- Matt Connell – drums
- Topon Das – guitar, vocals
- Mel Mongeon – vocals (1–17)
