= Vagina Dancer =

Studio album by Fuck the Facts
- Released: September 30, 2000
- Recorded: July–August 2000
- Genre: Noise, experimental
- Length: 39:02
- Label: Where Late the Birds Sang

Fuck the Facts chronology
Fuck the Facts (1999)	Vagina Dancer (2000)	Discoing the Dead (2001)

Vagina Dancer is the second full-length release by Canadian grindcore band Fuck the Facts. It was released on September 30, 2000, and features the more experimental noise recordings. At the time, Fuck the Facts consisted only of Topon Das.

== Track listing ==
All tracks are written by Topon Das except were indicated

No.	Title	Length
1.	"Necrotekno"	2:26
2.	"Vagina vs. Machine"	8:36
3.	"Glass Eye"	4:20
4.	"Vaginal Tears"	0:35
5.	"Nice to Beat You"	3:20
6.	"Vagina Dance It"	1:28
7.	"Audio Trauma"	4:20
8.	"The Dance Is on You"	4:27
9.	"Crawl the Spine"	7:30
10.	"Hot Cop" (The Village People)	3:00

== Personnel ==
- Topon Das - All instruments
