= Disgorge Mexico =

Studio album by Fuck The Facts
- Released: July 22, 2008 (release history)
- Recorded: August 6th to 17th (instruments); November 2007 (vocals)
- Genre: Deathgrind
- Length: 44:46
- Labels: Relapse Records (CD); Stillborn Records(Vinyl)
- Producers: Fuck the Facts, Craig Boychuk

Fuck The Facts chronology
Stigmata High-Five (2006)	Disgorge Mexico (2008)	The Wreaking (2008)

Disgorge Mexico is the eighth album by Canadian grindcore band Fuck the Facts. It is their second album on Relapse Records from a three-album contract with the label. The instruments were recorded from the 6th to the 17th of August 2007 at Liverpool Court Studios in Ottawa, Ontario, Canada. The vocals were recorded in November 2007 at Fuck the Facts own home studio (The Tower of Self Medication Studio). The album was mixed and mastered at CB Audio in Winnipeg from December 2007 until March 2008.

An enhanced portion of the CD includes a story accounting the events leading up to the writing of the album. There is also a video, "High Street," which was created by David Hall (who also directed the video for "The Sound of Your Smashed Head") which features music by the band. A studio video and audio journal from the road trip are also included.

A vinyl pressing of the album was set to be released in early 2009 on Coptercrash Records on gold, white and clear vinyl, however, the label had to cancel it because of financial troubles. The album was finally pressed on vinyl and released by Stillborn Records in June 2009. The pressing consisted of 400 copies on white vinyl, and 100 on black.

== Writing process ==
Following the final tour for their last album Stigmata High-Five, Fuck the Facts parted ways with their bass player Steve Chartier. A few weeks later, Topon and Vil drove a van on a two-week trip to Mexico and back to write the new album. They took a variety of demo and rehearsal tapes with them that they had gathered over the years, and would use rehearsal space along the way at friends' places or garages to piece together the album. Upon returning to Canada, they spent a few more weeks fine-tuning the material they had come up with, and then brought it to the studio.

== Release ==
The album was first mentioned by the band in the late summer and early fall of 2007. During the recording process (the fall of 2007), little was mentioned on the album's progress; additionally, the band did not have any live shows scheduled. On April 24, 2008, the album was officially announced via the band's official website and Myspace website, with some words on the process of making the album.

On June 21, following a tour of Western Canada with Neuraxis and Gross Misconduct, Fuck the Facts posted two songs from the new album ("Absence and Despite" and "The Storm") on their Myspace page. On June 30 a third song, "Apathy Is a Karma Killer," was posted. Following that, the band streamed one song a day (in the order found on the album) from July 7 until July 21. Following the release of the album, the band performed a free CD release party in their hometown of Hull, Quebec at Le Petit Chicago. They performed Disgorge Mexico in its entirety from start to finish. This performance was later released on Disgorge Mexico: The DVD.

== Track listing ==
All lyrics are written by Mélanie Mongeon (except "Dead End" by Mélanie Mongeon and Topon Das); all music is composed by Fuck the Facts with assistance where indicated.

Disgorge Mexico
No.	Title	Music	Length
1.	"Borders" (hidden track)		1:21
2.	"No Return"		0:32
3.	"Absence and Despite"	with Chartier	2:47
4.	"Kelowna"		1:48
5.	"As Empires Expand and Collapse"	with Chartier	2:18
6.	"Dead End"		1:37
7.	"Driving Through Fallen Cities"	with Connell/Audette	1:04
8.	"La Culture du Faux"		3:07
9.	"State of Panic"		2:31
10.	"No Place for Failure"		3:11
11.	"The Storm"	with Chartier	5:24
12.	"Apathy Is a Karma Killer"		9:20
13.	"Golden Age"		2:42
14.	"The Pile of Flesh You Carry"		2:18
15.	"Sleepless"	with Chartier	4:46
Total length:			44:46

Vangorge Audio Tour Journal
No.	Title	Length
1.	"Day 1: Part 1"	1:08
2.	"Day 1: Part 2"	0:48
3.	"Day 1: Part 3"	0:34
4.	"Day 1: Part 4"	1:57
5.	"Day 2: Part 1"	0:39
6.	"Day 2: Part 2"	2:08
Total length:		10:58

Video content
No.	Title	Writer(s)	Created by	Length
1.	"High Street"	David Hall, Fuck the Facts	David Hall	11:49
2.	"The Making of Disgorge Mexico"			5:24

== Release history ==
Region	Date	Label	Format	Catalog	Notes
United States	July 22, 2008	Relapse Records	CD	RR 7003-2	
Japan	July 23, 2008	Relapse Records	CD	YSCY-1100	
Germany	July 25, 2008	Relapse Records	CD	RR 7003-2	
United States	June 13, 2009	Stillborn Records	SBR 54	Vinyl	400 white 100 black

== Personnel ==
- Topon Das – guitar, bass, noise, engineer (vocals)
- Mélanie Mongeon – vocals, artwork
- Mathieu Vilandré – drums, guitar, bass
- Craig Boychuk – producer, engineer (instruments), mixing, mastering
- Fuck the Facts – producer
