= Backstabber Etiquette =

Studio album by Fuck the Facts
- Released: June 5, 2003
- Recorded: 2002
- Genres: Grindcore, death metal
- Length: 30:20
- Labels: Great White North, Grind It!

Fuck the Facts chronology
Escunta (2002)	Backstabber Etiquette (2003)	Live Damage (2003)

Backstabber Etiquette is the sixth album by Canadian grindcore band Fuck the Facts. The band recorded the album in 2002 at their own studio. The album was mastered by David Cain at Shark Fin Mastering in Ottawa, Ontario. This release marks the first full-length album with vocalist Mel Mongeon.

The album was initially stated for a June 1 release; however, the pressing plant lost the first batch of CDs. The CD became available on June 5 at the band's CD release concert in Kingston, Ontario.

There were two pressings of Backstabber Etiquette. The first was 1000 copies, and the second was another 1000 copies in July 2004.

== Track listing ==
1. "Second Hand Skin" – 3:22
2. "Ballet Addict" – 1:55
3. "A Few Words for the End" – 4:05
4. "N.S.S.T.S." – 1:36
5. "Si-Z'H" – 1:03
6. "Lying Through Your Teeth" – 3:43
7. "Living a Lie" – 1:36
8. "Greed Whore" – 2:16
9. "Smokin' a Fatty" – 3:53
10. "The Burning Side" – 4:05
11. "23-17-41" – 3:56

== Personnel ==
- Topon Das – guitar
- Matt Connell – drums
- Mel Mongeon – vocals, artwork, design
- Tim Audette – bass

Production

- Fuck the Facts – composition, recording
- David Cain – mastering
- Liba Suda – artwork, design
- Michal Majewski – photography

== Recording ==
The drum tracks were recorded in the first week of January 2002. While the drums were being mixed, the first guitar tracks were recorded in March.
