= Four0ninE =

EP by Fuck the Facts
- Released: August 9, 2001
- Recorded: May 2001
- Genre: Grindcore, electronic
- Length: 8:08
- Label: Ghetto Blaster Recordings

Fuck the Facts chronology
Discoing the Dead (2001)	Four0ninE (2001)	Mullet Fever (2001)

Four0ninE is the first EP by Canadian grindcore band Fuck the Facts. It was recorded in mid May 2001 by the band. It marks the first recordings with vocalist Brent Christoff, and the only recordings with bassist Shomir Das. It is the second release by Fuck the Facts as a band, the first being a split with Ames Sanglates. Days after the recording of this EP, Shomir left the band.

== Track listing ==
All tracks are written by Fuck the Facts, except where noted

No.	Title	Length
1.	"Released"	0:22
2.	"Whisper Dependency"	2:03
3.	"Roach"	2:16
4.	"Lack of Imagination"	1:02
5.	"409" (The Beach Boys)	2:13
6.	"Untitled"	0:12

== Release ==
Topon had been in contact with Mortuary I.O.D. for recording a split with another band he was in, Recondite. However, he was asked to leave Recondite before the release was finalized. Because he had been in contact with Mortuary I.O.D., he decided that Fuck the Facts would be on the split instead.

Ultimately, the split was never released due to financial complications, so the band decided to release the songs on their own. It was released on 99 3" mini CD-Rs in August. It was re-released in 2003 on a split with Banzai 606 on First Aid Productions and again in 2005 as part of the Mullet Fever reissue documenting the first year of Fuck the Facts as a full band.
