= Great White North Records =

Canadian independent record label

- Founded: 1999
- Founder: Rémi Côté and Stéphane Bélanger
- Status: Defunct
- Genre: Extreme metal, heavy metal
- Country of origin: Canada
- Location: Longueuil, Quebec, Canada
- Official website: http://www.gwnrecords.com/ (inactive)

Great White North Records was a Canadian independent record label founded in 1999 and dissolved in 2006. It was founded by Rémi Côté and Stéphane Bélanger and focused on promoting metal. Though the label released music by bands from around the world, it was a notable outlet and supporter of Canadian metal.

== History ==
Over the course of its existence GWN had a European outlet in the Netherlands (Great White North Records Europe) which manufactured select GWN releases for its own market, a French distribution office (GWN Records France) and spawned two sub-labels: Grind It! Records (for grindcore and crust) and Demÿsteriis (for black metal and other dark music). Productions Nouvelle France was also started with partner's in France, specializing in French rock and punk. In late 2003 the European outlet separated from the Canadian branch due to "differences in company politics."

On December 3, 2003 Rémi and Stéphane opened a record store in Montreal called Profusion: Le Metal Store. The record label operations were run out of the same offices. In March 2006, Rémi Côté decided to leave Great White North Records to "concentrate on [his] store, [his] traveling addiction and various new projects." That July, only a few months later, Great White North closed. Côté went on to start Prodisk, which continues to release Canadian metal.

== Discography ==
=== GWN releases ===
Cat#	Group	Title	Format	Canadian Release Date	European Release Date	Notes
GWN 001	(Canada) Ghoulunatics	Mystralengine	CD	1999	n/a	Not released in EU.
GWN 002	(Slovakia) Suffocate	Exit 64	CD	August 2000		Originally released on Erebos Productions in 1998.
GWN 003	(Netherlands) Necrology	Malignancy Defined	CD	March 2001	February 14, 2001	
GWN 004	(Russia) Merlin	They Must Die	CD	December 4, 2000	May 29, 2001	
GWN 004	(Russia) Merlin	They Must Die	CD	2004		Reissued with new artwork.
GWN 005	(Canada) Asgard	Cold Season	CD	February 15, 2002		
GWN 006	(Poland) Diachronia	XX's Decline	CD	April 2001	October 2001	Slightly different artwork between EU and CAN.
GWN 007	(Netherlands) C of E	Protect Me From What I Want	CD	January 2002		
GWN 008	(Belarus) Divina Enema	Under Phoenix Phenomenon	CD	September 15, 2003		
GWN 009	(Canada) Obliveon	Greatest Pits	CD	May 2002		
GWN 010	(Canada) Soulforge	Duality	CD	2002		
GWN 011	(Russia) Merlin	Brutal Constructor	CD	2004		
GWN 012	(Canada) Aggression A.D.	Forgotten Skeleton	CD	2004		
GWN 013	(Canada) Paroxysm	Revelation is Denied	CD	August 15, 2004		An enhanced reissue was released in February 2006.
GWN 014	(Canada) Brief Respite	Lullaby To The Moon	CD	April 20, 2005		
GWN 015	(Canada) The Mass	Towards Darkness	CD	December 2005		
GWN 016	(Russia) Mind Eclipse	Utopia: Formula of God	CD	2005		
GWN 017	(Canada) CortisoL	Meat	CD	December 3, 2005		
GWN 018	(Canada) Fuck the Facts	Collection of Splits 2002-2004	CD	April 28, 2006		
GWN 019	(Canada) Aggression	The Full Treatment	CD	2005		Reissue
GWN 020	(Canada) Collapse	Destroying by Design	CD	February 17, 2006		
GWN 021	(Canada) Talamyus	As Long as it Flows	CD	October 2005		
GWN 023	(Canada) Hellacaust	Inevitable dementia	CD	April 2006		
GWNMC007	(Netherlands) C of E	Day By Day	Enhanced CD Single	2001		1 audio track + 1 video
GWNUBR1	Various	Great White North 2K5	CD	February 2005		

=== Canceled releases ===
These releases were slated for release in 2006, however, they never materialized before the label dissolved.

Group	Title	Format	Planned Release Date	Notes
Various	Profusion Volume 1	CD	January 2006	Later released by Prodisk/Profusion.
(Canada) Paroxysm	Revelation Is Denied	CD	February 2006	Currently unreleased. Reissue with bonus video.
(Canada) Gorguts	Live in Rotterdam	CD	March 2006	Later released by Prodisk.
(Canada) Obliveon	From This Day Forward	CD	March 2006	Later released by Prodisk. Reissue with bonus content.
(Canada) Thy Flesh Consumed	Pacified by Oceans of Blood	CD	April 2006	Later released by CDN Records in November.
(Canada) Fuck the Facts	Stigmata High-Five	CD	May 2006	Later released by Relapse Records in August.
(Canada) Towards Darkness	Solemn	CD	May 2006	Later released by Twilight Foundation in December 2007.
(Canada) Obliveon	Nemesis	CD	June 2006	Later released by Prodisk. Reissue with bonus content.
(Canada) Cortisol	S-12	CD	June 2006	Later released by Prodisk in October.
(Canada) Gorguts	Live At The Whiskey	DVD	December 2006	Currently unreleased.
Various	Le Brotherhood	DVD	January 2006	Currently unreleased.

=== Grind It! releases ===
Cat#	Group	Title	Format	Release date	Notes
GIT-001	(Russia) Merlin	Deathkoteque	CD	October 2001	Remastered. Originally on cassette only.
GIT-00?	(Canada) Trails of Anguish	Relentless Abhorrence of Misery's Grievance	CD	2002	Originally self-released by the band in 1999.
GIT-002	(Canada) Aphasia	Arcane In Thalassa	CD	January 2002	
GIT-004	(Belarus) Divina Enema	At The Conclave	CD	2002	Originally released in 2000 on Eldrich Music.
GIT-005	(Germany) BK 49	Join the Dead	CD	2003	
GIT-006	(Canada) Dahmer	The Studio Sessions: Discography	CD	2003	
GIT-007	(Canada) Fuck the Facts	Backstabber Etiquette	CD	2003	
GIT-008	(Canada) Fistfuck	23 Songs In The Same Hole	CD	2004	
GIT-009	(Canada) Fistfuck / (United States) Aberrant	Split CD	CD	2005	

=== Demÿsteriis Releases ===
Cat#	Group	Title	Format	Street Date YYYY-MM-DD
MYS 001	(France) The Eternal Blade	The Eternal Blade	CD	2005-03
MYS 002	(France) Funerarium	Noces Chimiques	CD	2005
