= Misery (EP) =

EP by Fuck the Facts
- Released: October 10, 2011
- Recorded: November 2010
- Genre: Grindcore, death metal
- Label: Independent

Fuck the Facts chronology
Die Miserable (2011)	Misery (2011)	Amer (2013)

Misery is the fifth EP by Canadian grindcore band Fuck the Facts. The EP was released on 10 October 2011, in conjunction with their album Die Miserable. The EP is limited to 500 hand-numbered copies on CD, 100 cassettes, and is also available as a digital download.

== Track listing ==
All lyrics are written by Fuck the Facts unless noted otherwise; all music is composed by Fuck the Facts

No.	Title	Length
1.	"End of the Line"	3:26
2.	"Home"	1:59
3.	"Running the Wolverine's Gauntlet" (Jesse Matthewson)	1:07
4.	"Impromptu"	1:24
5.	"À Contre-Courant"	0:50
6.	"Misery"	6:13
7.	"Unburden"	2:10
8.	"Smooth Beige"	0:58
9.	"Inside Out" (Elliot Desgagnés)	0:54

== Personnel ==
=== Fuck the Facts ===
- Topon Das – guitar, mixing, mastering
- Mel Mongeon – vocals, artwork
- Mathieu Vilandré – drums, guitar, vocals
- Marc Bourgon – bass, guitar, vocals
- Johnny Ibay – guitar

=== Additional musicians ===
- Jesse Matthewson – vocals on "Running the Wolverine's Gauntlet"
- Elliot Desgagnés – vocals on "Inside Out"
- Leigh Newton – guitar noise on "Smooth Beige"

=== Production ===
- Martin Cleal – recording

== Recording ==
The album was recorded at Apartment 2 Studios by the band and Martin Cleal in November 2010. The album was then mixed and mastered by Topon Das in June 2011.
