= Legacy of Hopelessness =

EP by Fuck the Facts
- Released: July 1, 2005
- Recorded: November 12, 2004 (drums and bass); November to December 2004 (everything else); 1997 (bonus tracks)
- Genre: Grindcore, electronic
- Length: 10:08 (CD tracks only); 21:35 (with bonus tracks)
- Label: Ghetto Blaster Productions, Capital Kill Records (co-production)

Fuck the Facts chronology
Live Damage (2003)	Legacy of Hopelessness (2005)	Collection of Splits 2002-2004 (2006)

Legacy of Hopelessness is the second EP by Canadian grindcore band Fuck the Facts. The drums and bass were recorded on November 12, 2004 at June Music Studio in Ottawa, ON. The remaining instruments and vocals were recorded in November and December 2004 at Fuck the Facts home studio (House of Fuck). The EP was mixed and mastered by Craig Boychuk at CB Audio in early 2005.

This was initially planned to be a solo release by Topon Das, however, it was migrated over to Fuck the Facts after the band realized that another full-length album was not feasible at that time. As such, the EP tends to show more overt electronic influences than previous releases.

In the UK, this EP was released without the enhanced tracks as an untitled split with Narcosis, Midget Parage and Archer on Privileged to Fail Records. A digital version of the EP was released in January 2011 and included a bonus track "Legacy of Hopelessness".

== Track listing ==
All lyrics are written by Topon Das except "Eclat-Boue-Sang" by Topon Das and Mel Mongeon; all music is composed by Topon Das

No.	Title	Length
1.	"City of Stone"	1:46
2.	"Horizon"	0:42
3.	"Dear Shit Book"	1:11
4.	"Short Term Goals, Long Term Disappointments"	2:14
5.	"Eclat-Boue-Sang"	2:44
6.	"Make Your Grave"	1:32

Enhanced Tracks
No.	Title	Length
7.	"132 and the Evil Jesus"	9:27
8.	"Armageddon Waltz"	2:00

Digital Bonus Track (2011)
No.	Title	Length
9.	"Legacy of Hopelessness"	2:12

== Personnel ==
- Topon Das – guitar, vocals, keyboards, MIDI, recording (except drums)
- Dave Menard – guitar
- Mel Mongeon – vocals
- Marc-André Mongeon – bass
- Tim Olsen – drums
- Craig Boychuk – mixing, mastering
- Stéphane Danis – recording (drums)

== Reception ==
Max Deneau of Exclaim! said in his review of the album that "their sound still remains abrasive and difficult to swallow upon first listen, especially due to the severely underwhelming running time, and the ear-piercing, distorted, barely audible vocals is still in full swing".
