= Mullet Fever =

2001 album by Fuck the Facts

Studio album by Fuck the Facts
- Released: December 2001
- Recorded: Fall 2001
- Genre: Grindcore
- Length: 34:16
- Label: Ghetto Blaster Recordings

Fuck the Facts chronology
| Four0ninE (2001) | Mullet Fever (2001) | Escunta (2002) |

Mullet Fever is the fourth album by Canadian grindcore band Fuck the Facts originally released in 2001. It was released on Topon's label Ghetto Blaster Recordings with only 200 CD-Rs being made. The album was reissued in 2005 with bonus tracks on Sonic Deadline Records.

== Track listing ==
All music and lyrics by Fuck the Facts except where indicated.

1. "All Hands on Deck" - 0:15
2. "Don't Call My Slammin' Outfit Cool, Whitebread!" - 0:43
3. "Doghead" - 0:32
4. "Burning the Grindcore Rule Book" - 1:00
5. "Cough Dropped from a Building" - 0:03
6. "Mullet Fever" - 0:06
7. "Gag Abflex" - 0:17
8. "Honey Please! Not in Front of the Children" - 0:32
9. "$4 Bill" - 0:07
10. "Gated Community" - 1:09
11. "I'm From (Europe)" - 0:55
12. "Cue Bert and Ernie Reyes" - 0:22
13. "Math Rock Superstar" - 0:31
14. "Castrata" - 1:21
15. "Bowling" - 0:14
16. "Yngwie vs. FTF" - 0:31
17. "I Baby-sit for Drug Money" - 0:35
18. "Red Mist" - 0:12
19. "Me and Dani Filth in a 6-4" - 0:56
20. "South Beach High" - 0:59
21. "Cold Turkey" - 0:17
22. "Instrumental (Hugs and Stitches)" - 0:47
23. "The Words Myth" - 1:31
24. "Unfocused" - 0:56
25. "Fisherman's Fiend" - 0:31
26. "If You're 555, Then You're Giving Me a Fake Number" - 0:10
27. "You Smoke You Toke (written by Course of Action)" - 0:12
28. "Running Outta Time" - 0:39
29. "Day Dream" - 0:18
30. "Mattochrondria" - 0:13
31. "Fate of Man (written by Disgruntled)" - 2:18
32. "Master of Puppets (written by Metallica)" - 1:40
33. "Outro (Sonny Bono)" - 1:43
34. "Battle Hymn" - 4:23
35. "Roach (live)" - 2:16
36. "Revenge Tactics II" - 3:02
37. "Just Say Yo" - 2:00

== Personnel ==
- Tim Audette – guitar
- Brent Christoff – vocals
- Matt Connell – drums, vocals, piano
- Topon Das – guitar, vocals, electronics

== Recording ==
Mullet Fever was created and recorded in the Fall of 2001 largely in one session at the band's rehearsal space. Some songs were written and recorded on the spot, while others had small edits performed shortly afterward. The style of this record is more raw and punk-like grindcore that is different than most other Fuck the Facts releases.

== Release history ==
| Date | Label | Catalog | Format | Notes |
|---|---|---|---|---|
| Fall 2001 | Ghetto Blaster Recordings | ? | CD-R | 200 copies made. |
| ? | Kill For Food Records | ? | Cassette | |
| April 1, 2004 | Speedrawk Records | SPEED 015 | Cassette | Distributed in Asia |
| June 8, 2005 | Sonic Deadline Records | SDR 002 | CD | Remastered with bonus material. |

== Reissue ==
Mullet Fever

Studio album by Fuck the Facts
- Released: June 8, 2005
- Recorded: Fall 2001 (original content); May 2001 (Four0ninE content); April 2001 ("Blood Pulp" mp3); August 4, 2001 ("Whisper Dependency (live)" mp3); September 23, 2001 (Video)
- Genre: Grindcore
- Length: 39:56 (CD audio); 59:00 (with enhanced content)
- Label: Sonic Deadline Records

In 2005, Mullet Fever was reissued on Sonic Deadline Records "to document the first incarnation of Fuck The Facts as a full band." It featured new artwork by current singer Mel Mongeon and it was remastered by Craig Boychuk. The reissue expands on the original release to include every release the band recorded with vocalist Brent Christoff. It features the following media:

- The standard Mullet Fever tracks (minus the live version of "Roach").
- "Blood Pulp", recorded in April 2001 and originally released on a split with Ames Sanglantes. It features only Topon, Matt and Tim.
- The Four0ninE EP, recorded in May 2001 and originally released on 99 mini CD-Rs. This was recorded after both Shomir and Brent had joined the band.
- Music video for "Roach." Video footage recorded September 23, 2001 at Planet Kensington (Toronto, Ontario). Edited and produced February 2005.

=== Track listing ===
All music and lyrics by Fuck the Facts except where indicated.

1. "All Hands on Deck" - 0:15
2. "Don't Call My Slammin' Outfit Cool, Whitebread!" - 0:43
3. "Doghead" - 0:32
4. "Burning the Grindcore Rule Book" - 1:00
5. "Cough Dropped from a Building" - 0:03
6. "Mullet Fever" - 0:06
7. "Gag Abflex" - 0:17
8. "Honey Please! Not in Front of the Children" - 0:32
9. "$4 Bill" - 0:07
10. "Gated Community" - 1:09
11. "I'm From (Europe)" - 0:55
12. "Cue Bert and Ernie Reyes" - 0:22
13. "Math Rock Superstar" - 0:31
14. "Castrata" - 1:21
15. "Bowling" - 0:14
16. "Yngwie vs. FTF" - 0:31
17. "I Baby-sit for Drug Money" - 0:35
18. "Red Mist" - 0:12
19. "Me and Dani Filth in a 6-4" - 0:56
20. "South Beach High" - 0:59
21. "Cold Turkey" - 0:17
22. "Instrumental (Hugs and Stitches)" - 0:47
23. "The Words Myth" - 1:31
24. "Unfocused" - 0:56
25. "Fisherman's Fiend" - 0:31
26. "If You're 555, Then You're Giving Me a Fake Number" - 0:10
27. "You Smoke You Toke (written by Course of Action)" - 0:12
28. "Running Outta Time" - 0:39
29. "Day Dream" - 0:18
30. "Mattochrondria" - 0:13
31. "Fate of Man (written by Disgruntled)" - 2:18
32. "Master of Puppets (written by Metallica)" - 1:40
33. "Outro (Sonny Bono)" - 1:43
34. "Battle Hymn" - 4:23
35. "Revenge Tactics II" - 3:02
36. "Just Say Yo" - 2:00
37. "Released" - 0:22
38. "Whisper Dependency" - 2:03
39. "Roach (live)" - 2:16
40. "Lack of Imagination" - 1:02
41. "409" (written by The Beach Boys) - 2:13

=== Enhanced content ===
1. "Blood Pulp" - 14:30 (MP3)
2. "Whisper Dependency (live)" - 2:01 (MP3)
3. "Roach (live)" - 2:33 (Video)
