= Stigmata High-Five =

Studio album by Fuck the Facts
- Released: August 22, 2006
- Recorded: February 16 to March 1, 2006
- Genre: Death metal, grindcore
- Length: 33:53
- Label: Relapse Records
- Producer: Fuck the Facts, Jean-Philippe Latour

Fuck the Facts chronology
Collection of Splits 2002-2004 (2006)	Stigmata High-Five (2006)	Disgorge Mexico (2008)

Professional ratings
Review scores
Source	Rating
Allmusic	3/5 stars
Stylus Magazine	(B)
Blabbermouth.net	7.5/10 stars

Stigmata-High Five is the seventh full-length album by the Canadian grindcore band Fuck the Facts released August 20, 2006. It is the band's first release on Relapse Records. Stigmata High-Five is also the first recording to feature Mathieu Vilandré on drums. He had joined the band as a second guitarist in 2005 and took over drumming duties after Tim Olsen was asked to leave the band.

In January 2006 it was announced that Stigmata High-Five would be released on Great White North Records in May of that year. The Collection of Splits 2002-2004, which was slated for a February release, was pushed back until late May, and ended up being the final release on Great White North Records before it folded. However, early into the recording of Stigmata High-Five, Relapse Records contacted the band and secured a three-album deal.

The album was released on an enhanced CD that contains 2 bonus tracks in MP3 format, as well as a "making of" video and a music video. The album was also released on 3 different colors of vinyl; white (limited to 300 copies), red (limited to 600 copies) and clear (limited to 100 copies and not available to the public).

== Track listing ==
All music by Fuck the Facts with assistance where indicated.
All lyrics By Mel Mongeon and Timothy Leo.

1. "La Dernière Image" (writing assistance by Dave Menard, Marc-André Mongeon, Tim Olsen) – 7:03
2. "The Wrecking" (writing assistance by Menard, M.A. Mongeon, Olsen) – 4:38
3. "Carve Your Heart Out" – 2:32
4. "Taken from the Nest" (writing assistance by Menard, M.A. Mongeon, Olsen) – 5:01
5. "What's Left Behind" (writing assistance by Menard, M.A. Mongeon, Olsen) – 3:41
6. "The Sound of Your Smashed Head" (writing assistance by Matt Connell) – 2:06
7. "Dead in the Ruins of Your Own City" – 8:50

== Enhanced CD Contents ==
=== MP3 Tracks ===
- Stigmata High-Five – 2:44
- Ants – 2:00

=== Videos ===
- The Making of "Stigmata High-Five" – 5:13
- The Wrecking – 4:57

== Personnel ==
- Topon Das – guitar, keyboard
- Mel Mongeon – vocals, artwork, lyrics
- Steve Chartier – bass, vocals
- Mathieu Vilandré – drums, guitar
- Jean-Philippe Latour – engineer, producer, photography
- Fuck the Facts – producer
- Timothy Leo – lyrics

== Recording ==
This album marks the first time that the band recorded in a studio other than their own, and with a producer outside of the band. It was recorded February 16–March 1, 2006 at Studio En-Phase in Montréal, Québec. The recording quality is much higher than their previous recordings, but the performances remain "raw" sounding. No drum triggers were used, and all of the guitar parts were run through amps, as opposed to being recorded direct into the board.
