= Fuck the Facts =

Canadian grindcore band

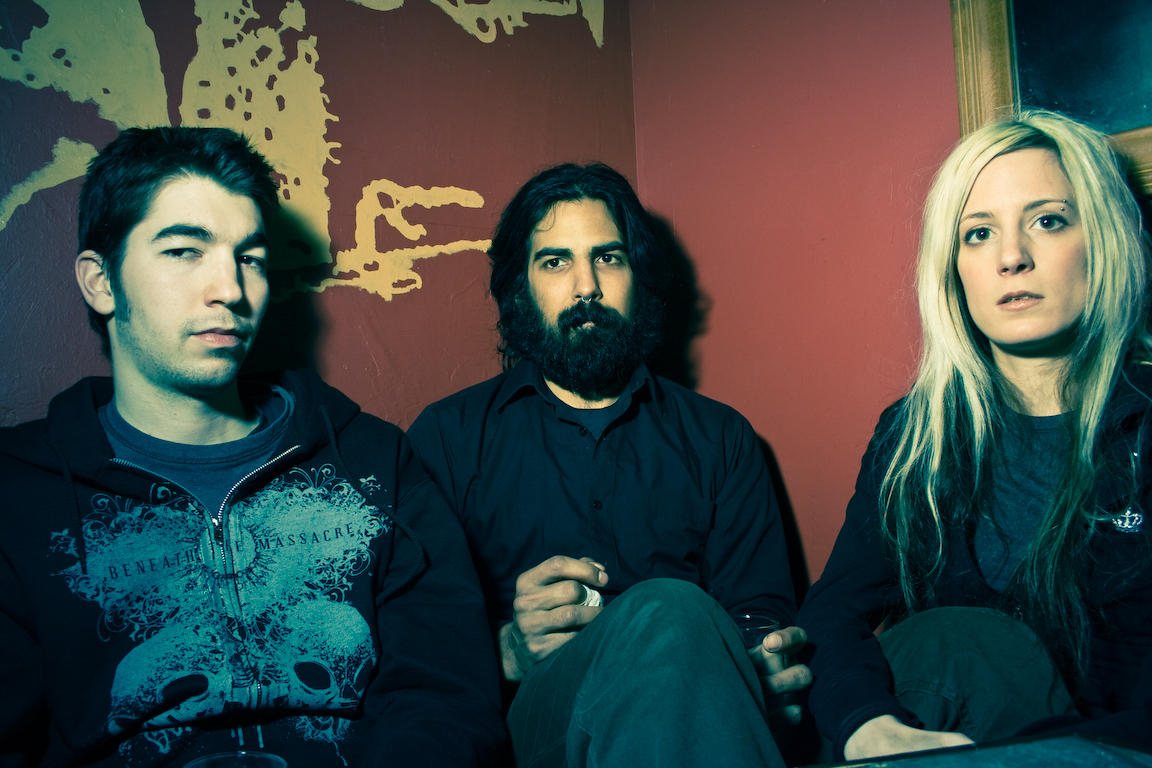
- Fuck the Facts in 2008. Left to right: Mathieu Vilandré, Topon Das, and Mel Mongeon.

Background information
- Origin: Gatineau, Québec, Canada
- Genre: Grindcore
- Years active: 1997–present
- Label: Relapse
- Members: Topon Das; Mel Mongeon; Mathieu Vilandré; Johnny Ibay
- Past members: Shomir Das; Marc-Andre Mongeon; Steve Chartier; Brent Christoff; Tim Audette; Dave Menard; Jean-Louis Wittinger; Matt Connell; Tim Olsen; Marc Bourgon
- Website: www.fuckthefacts.com

Fuck the Facts is a Canadian Juno-nominated, grindcore band from Gatineau, Québec, Canada, formed in 1998. They began as the solo recording project of musician Topon Das. Their earliest recording was in January 1997; they began using the name Fuck the Facts in 1998. After many early recordings, including split tapes with groups from around the world, Fuck the Facts began developing a name in the underground with fans of grind. In 2001, the first full-length CD-R, Discoing the Dead, was recorded. The same year, Das would assemble a full band to continue with the project. The band has since coined the terms "bastardized grindcore" and "mullet-core" to describe their sound.

== History ==
=== Formation (1998–2001) ===
Fuck the Facts began early in 1997 as an unnamed recording project by Topon Das. The project remained nameless until featured on a compilation in 1998, when Topon decided on the name Fuck the Facts after a song from the first Naked City album. A self-titled cassette was released on Topon's Dedfuk Records that compiled all of the recordings made since the project's inception. Fuck the Facts released split cassettes with Cult of the Damned, Longdreamdead and S.M.E.S. then, in September 2000, released another full-length cassette entitled Vagina Dancer on the Slovakian label Where Late The Birds Sang. Vagina Dancer showcased a more experimental, noise side to Fuck the Facts than the self-titled release, which featured more of a grindcore style.

=== Discoing the Dead, Mullet Fever (2001–2002) ===
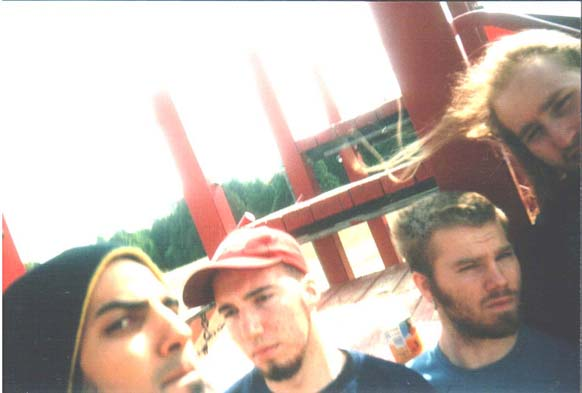
Fuck the Facts Mullet Fever lineup ca. 2001. Left to right, Topon Das, Brent Christoff, Matt Connell, Tim Audette.

With the two full length tapes, and the various splits, Fuck The Facts started to gain notoriety in the underground noise and grindcore world. The next full-length album, Discoing the Dead, was recorded in 2000 and released on Ghetto Blaster Recordings (another label run by Topon) on February 6, 2001. Positive feedback with this release motivated Topon to continue Fuck the Facts as a full band. Drummer Matt Connell and guitarist Tim Audette joined in late February. The three recorded music for a split with Ames Sanglantes, before the addition of vocalist Brent Christoff in April and bassist Shomir Das in May. In May 2001, the band recorded and released Four0ninE, an EP which featured a cover of The Beach Boys song "409."

Shomir left the band after three days, but the band continued on as a four-piece, performing their first live show on August 4, 2001 in Melbourne, Quebec. Regular performances around Ontario and Quebec continued until the fall when the band decided to record a full-length release. Before the end of 2001, the new Fuck the Facts line-up would release Mullet Fever, the full length follow-up to Discoing the Dead. Mullet Fever, with its catchphrase "37 Songs in 35 Minutes", featured a more punk-influenced grindcore sound, though it still retained some of the noise influence.

=== Backstabber Etiquette, Splits (2002–2003) ===
In early 2002, following the recording of Mullet Fever, Brent Christoff was replaced by Mel Mongeon. While Mel had made a guest appearance on a previously recorded split, her first recording as a member of the band was a re-recording of the song "The Burning Side" for the Goreland compilation CD released by Black Hole Productions (the song was originally featured on Discoing the Dead, performed by Topon). Since joining the band, Mel has done most of the artwork for Fuck the Facts releases.

The summer of 2002 saw the band expand their touring area reaching as far west as Winnipeg, and including a December tour of the Maritimes. The touring, along with the release of a split with Sylvester Staline, helped expand their fanbase overseas. The summer of 2002 also saw the release, on Mandarangan Recordings, of Escunta, the long-awaited noise follow-up to Vagina Dancer, which had actually been recorded from late 1999 to early 2000.

Following the winter Maritime tour, Fuck the Facts recorded their next full-length album, Backstabber Etiquette. It was released in early 2003 on Grind It! Records (a sub-label of Great White North Records). This new release featured a matured sound that incorporated progressive death metal elements in an already expanding sound.

After the release of Backstabber Etiquette, more touring ensued. This proved to be too demanding for guitarist Tim Audette, who departed in June 2003 (Audette died of multiple sclerosis in 2021). The band continued as a three-piece and recorded a series of three splits with Feeble Minded (My Anorexia, 2003), Sergent Slaughter (Overseas Connection, 2004) and Subcut (Eponymous, 2004). While recording the material for these splits, guitarist Dave Menard joined the band and brought new inspiration; the split with Subcut would be the last recording with drummer Matt Connell, who left to join the gore metal band Exhumed.

=== Legacy of Hopelessness (2004–2006) ===
Matt Connell was replaced by drummer Tim Olsen, and Marc-André Mongeon joined as bassist (the first since Shomir had left in 2001). As a five-piece, the band toured across Canada through the summer of 2004. The constant touring proved to be too much for Marc and Dave and they left the band in mid-2005.

Mathieu Vilandré and Steve Chartier (aka Esteve Decalisse) were brought on guitar and bass respectively in time for touring in support of Fuck the Fact's next release, Legacy of Hopelessness. This six-song EP was recorded in the fall of 2004 and was co-released in June 2005 through Ghetto Blaster Recordings and Steve's label Capital Kill. A much more experimental release, Legacy of Hopelessness featured more electronic and ambient elements combined with the usual Fuck the Facts grindcore sound. The summer support tour for the EP took the band from Sydney, Nova Scotia to Vancouver, British Columbia.

=== Collection of Splits, Stigmata High-Five (2006–2007) ===
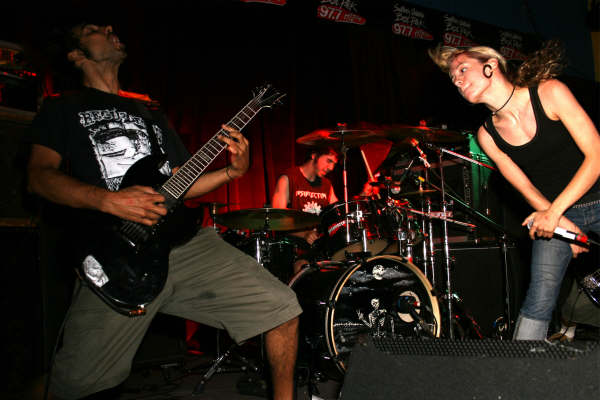
Fuck the Facts performing live in 2007. Left to right, Topon Das, Mathieu Vilandré, Mel Mongeon.

Upon return from the Legacy of Hopelessness tour, Mathieu Vilandré and Steve Chartier were brought into the band as permanent members. It was at this time that the band recorded a two-song pre-production demo as an indicator of the direction the band would be taking for their next album. These demos were eventually released on two splits—with Pleasant Valley (The Blasphemy of Free Thought/The Wreaking, 2006), and Mesrine (Eponymous, 2006), and were used to look for a record deal.

At the start of 2006, Tim Olsen was asked to leave the band. Mathieu Vilandré, who had previously filled in on drums, took over the position permanently and recording began for the next full-length album. Early in the recording process, the band was contacted by Relapse Records and secured a three-album deal that would start with their next album. In the interim, the Collection of Splits 2002-2004 was released by Great White North Records and exposed fans to some music that had been difficult to acquire due to limited pressings. It included all of the material from the splits released between Backstabber Etiquette and Legacy of Hopelessness (with Subcut, Sergent Slaughter, Feeble Minded and Sylvester Staline) as well as enhanced MP3 tracks from some earlier splits.

The summer of 2006 was filled with tours of the Maritimes, North-Eastern United States (including a performance at the New England Doom and Grind Festival), Ontario and Quebec. In August 2006, Stigmata High-Five was released on Relapse Records. The album highlighted not just a change in musical direction, but also a development in recording quality. For the first time, the band enlisted a producer to help them forge their sound and went to a professional studio to record.

Following the release of Stigmata High-Five, the band filmed a music video for the song "The Sound of Your Smashed Head", featuring local actors Adam Steptoe, Luke Williams, and Eugene Swain. That was followed by a seven-week US tour, including a slot on the Relapse Contamination Festival, and a three-week tour of Ontario and Quebec. Touring continued to June 2007, when the band decided to take a break and begin work on their next album.

=== Disgorge Mexico (2007–2009) ===
Following the final Stigmata High-Five tour in June 2007, the band parted ways with bassist Steve Chartier, then spent two weeks on a road trip to Mexico and back to write the material for their next album. The album was tracked that August; however the three remaining members decided that it was time to take a break. By January 2008, they were back performing again. The touring, along with some personal issues, slowed the mixing and mastering progress of the album, however by April it was announced that Disgorge Mexico would be released in North America on July 22, 2008 as the band's second Relapse Records release. The band celebrated the album's release with a free CD release party in which they performed the entire CD on August 2 in Hull, Quebec.

In 2009, Fuck the Facts embarked on their firstEuropean tour. Polish Relapse Records label mates Antigama and Dutch grindcore band Dr. Doom joined Fuck the Facts for the tour which lasted from February 12 to March 3, 2009. In an interview, Topon noted the irony that the band was only now finding its way to Europe considering that many of their earlier releases (up to a decade earlier) were on European labels. Late in 2009, the band announced that touring bassist Marc Bourgon had become a full-time member of the band. Marc had been touring with the band since January 2008, and had recorded with the band on their latest split with Leng Tch'e.

=== Unnamed EP and Die Miserable (2010–2013) ===
In late 2009, the band announced that the following year would see the release of a new EP, their first video release, and a new full-length album. In late February 2010, they released Unnamed EP having been recorded by the band and featuring artwork created and printed by the band—reviewers have lauded the band for their DIY ethic. In early March, the band left for Europe on a month-long Unnamed European Tour 2010 and later published video of it.

Upon returning to North America, the band completed work on their first video release, Disgorge Mexico: The DVD. The DVD combined a live performance of their 2008 album Disgorge Mexico with a short art film made by Canadian filmmaker David Hall that used the album as its soundtrack. A bonus DVD featuring a plethora of other videos was also included in limited numbers.

Fuck the Facts released Die Miserable on October 11, 2011, on Relapse Records. The band begun recording the album in January 2010, but put it on hold to tour and release their EP and DVD. The album was nominated for a Juno Award for Metal/Hard Music Album of the Year for 2012, but lost to KEN Mode's Venerable. A companion EP, Misery, was released the same day by the band. Fuck the Facts released the EP Amer on June 18, 2013.

=== Abandoned, Desire Will Rot, and Pleine Noirceur (Full Darkness) (2014-present) ===
On October 1, 2014, with the Relapse Records deal at an end, the band independently released a new EP, Abandoned. Two other studio albums followed–Desire Will Rot in 2015 and Pleine Noirceur (Full Darkness) in 2020. Desire Will Rot was nominated as Heavy Metal Album of the Year at the Juno Awards of 2016.

On September 26th, 2026, Fuck the Facts preformed as the closing act of the MASSiF Music Festival in Nelson, British Columbia.

== Musical style ==
"Gated Community"
Mullet Fever (2001).

Fuck the Facts has had three different vocalists, all with their own style and impact on the sound of the band. The first recordings up until Discoing the Dead feature only Topon on vocals (aside from a few guest appearances). His singing varies between deep growls and more high pitched screams. The Mullet Fever lineup features Brent Christoff who has a slightly deeper, more grunting sound. The biggest change is with the replacement of Brent with Mel Mongeon who has a very distinctive high-pitched shriek which has become the vocal style that the band is most known for.

Most (if not all) Fuck the Facts songs are played on guitars tuned down a fourth (B E A D F# B). Bass tuning is the same (B E A D), though depending on the performer, sometimes a 5 string bass is used. Common grindcore elements such as blast beats are also present. Generally, most of the songs feature the darker modes such as Aeolian, Phrygian, Locrian and heavy use of the tritone, though many songs feature other more chromatic scales as well. Different textures are used to create different moods. For example, a common feature will be the use of clean guitar within the context of a grindcore song that creates a radical change in the sound of the piece (an example would be the last half of Gated Community from Mullet Fever). Despite these few generalities, the musical style of the band has changed over the years.

=== Early period ===
Topon has stated numerous times that the name Fuck the Facts was chosen, in part, as a statement about his attitude towards the music he wrote. He tried not to feel hampered by genre labels, and that is reflected in the musical style. The earlier Fuck the Facts recordings up until approximately 2000 featured a combination of grindcore and noise. Though those two genres were prominent during this era of recording, many other styles crept into the music as well including death metal, crust punk, electronic and even as some as diverse as disco and jazz. When Discoing the Dead was released in early 2001, it retained many of these experimental styles, paving the way for the beginning of the first incarnation of Fuck the Facts as a full band.

In addition to the grindcore style of the recordings, there were also many songs that were almost straight noise recordings. Vagina Dancer and Escunta, recorded in 2000 and 2001 respectively, are the core of these noise recordings, with some other tracks being featured on various compilations and splits.

Mullet Fever was released in 2002 and featured a more punk-influenced grindcore sound. However, many of the songs included more experimental (for grindcore) styles including rap, hip-hop, jazz, noise and electronic. The album was largely recorded in one session of the band recording their own jam session and some minimal editing afterwards, and may explain why this album stands out on its own in terms of musical style and scope.

=== Middle period ===
When Backstabber Etiquette was recorded in 2002, vocalist Mel Mongeon had replaced Christoff, and her distinctive growl was markedly different than Brent's deep sound. Mel's higher pitched scream became the norm for the band. The musical style became more heavily influenced by death metal and showed more technical aspirations. This style persisted over the splits recorded between Backstabber Etiquette and Legacy of Hopelessness (these recordings are largely what make up the tracks on the Collection of Splits 2002-2004).

Legacy of Hopelessness showcased a bit of a departure for the band in that it had a lot more electronic influences. Keyboards are featured on nearly every track, and are sometimes the primary focus. Of course, grindcore is still quite present as well as Mel's distinctive vocals. The change in musical style can probably be attributed to this being initially intended to be a solo release by Topon, but was migrated over to the band when it was realized that another full-length release was not quite feasible.

=== Later period ===
"La Dernière Image"
Stigmata High-Five (2006).

Stigmata High-Five represents the latest musical style of the band. The grindcore and death metal elements are still present, but so are more progressive and experimental ideas mixed with metalcore elements. The album contains longer songs with more intricate riffs and atypical time signatures. For example, the opening song "La Dernière Image" moves from groove-oriented grindcore based around a repeating clave rhythm with odd meters interspersed throughout (the clave rhythm and odd meters are both basic musical features of much progressive rock). A middle section counters that with more ambient textures and clean guitars.

Disgorge Mexico contains shorter songs than Stigmata High-Five but retains a similar overall musical style. In some cases, the experimental ideas are expanded further to the point where one track contains a section that is reminiscent of straight ahead jazz and contains a high register melodic bass solo typical of jazz or fusion. Rhythmic elements often featured in progressive rock are still present, and metric dissonance via polyrhythms are often present.

== Band members ==
=== Current ===
- Topon Das – guitars (1998–present)
- Melanie Mongeon – vocals (2002–present)
- Mathieu "Vil" Vilandré – drums, guitars (2005–present)

=== Former ===
- Matt Connell – drums (February 2001–2004)
- Tim Audette – guitars (February 2001–2003)
- Brent Christoff – vocals (April 2001–2002)
- Shomir Das – bass (May 23, 2001–May 26, 2001)
- Dave Menard – guitars (2003–2005)
- Tim Olsen – drums (2004–2006)
- Marc-Andre Mongeon – bass (2004–2005)
- Steve Chartier – bass (2005–2007)
- Marc "Chops" Bourgon – bass, vocals (2009–2017)
- Johnny "Beige" Ibay – guitars (2010–2015)

=== Touring ===
- Travis Tomchuk – vocals (May 2006)
- Jean-Louis Wittinger – guitars (September 2006–December 2006)
- Leigh Newton – guitars (January–March 2008)
- Jonathan Ibay – guitars (June 2008–present)

== Discography ==
In addition to the releases below, Fuck the Facts have released a plethora of splits that count for a large portion of their repertoire. Additionally, the band has been featured on numerous compilations and tribute albums.

=== Studio albums ===
- 1999: Fuck the Facts (Dedfuk Records)
- 2000: Vagina Dancer (Where Late the Bird Sang)
- 2001: Discoing the Dead (Ghetto Blaster Recordings)
- 2001: Mullet Fever (Ghetto Blaster Recordings)
- 2002: Escunta (Mandarangan Recordings)
- 2003: Backstabber Etiquette (Grind It! Records)
- 2006: Stigmata High-Five (Relapse Records)
- 2008: Disgorge Mexico (Relapse Records)
- 2011: Die Miserable (Relapse Records)
- 2015: Desire Will Rot
- 2020: Pleine Noirceur

=== EPs and other releases ===
- 2001: Four0ninE (Ghetto Blaster Recordings)
- 2005: Legacy of Hopelessness (Ghetto Blaster Recordings / Capital Kill Records)
- 2006: Collection of Splits 2002–2004 (Great White North Records)
- 2008: The Wreaking (self released)
- 2010: Unnamed EP (self released)
- 2010: Disgorge Mexico: The DVD
- 2011: Misery (self released)
- 2013: Amer
- 2014: Abandoned
