= List of Rab C. Nesbitt episodes =

Rab C. Nesbitt is a British television sitcom, created by Ian Pattison, and produced by BBC Scotland. It originally premiering with a Christmas special, broadcast on BBC1, before being transmitted on BBC2. The series, set in Govan, Glasgow, follows Rab C. Nesbitt (Gregor Fisher), an alcoholic who strives to maintain an unemployed lifestyle.

During the course of the programme, 67 episodes of Rab C. Nesbitt aired, including six specials over ten series, between 22 December 1988 and 2 January 2014.

== Series overview ==
Series	Episodes	Originally released		
Series	Episodes	First released	Last released	Network
"Seasonal Greet" special		22 December 1988		BBC One Scotland
1	7	27 September 1990	31 December 1990	BBC Two
Live Special		24 January 1992		BBC Two
2	7	14 May 1992	31 December 1992	BBC Two
3	6	16 November 1993	21 December 1993	BBC Two
4	7	19 September 1994	29 December 1994	BBC Two
5	6	5 January 1996	9 February 1996	BBC Two
6	6	1 August 1997	5 September 1997	BBC Two
7	6	21 August 1998	25 September 1998	BBC Two
8	6	14 May 1999	18 June 1999	BBC Two
"Clean" special		23 December 2008		BBC Two
9	6	21 January 2010	25 February 2010	BBC Two
10	6	5 October 2011	9 November 2011	BBC Two
"Hoodie" special		2 January 2014		BBC Two

== Episodes ==
=== Christmas Special (1988) ===
No. overall	No. in series	Title	Directed by	Written by	Original release date
1	S	"Seasonal Greet"	Colin Gilbert	Ian Pattison	22 December 1988 (Scotland); 31 December 1989 (UK wide)
Disillusioned with the whole idea of the festive season, Rab embarks on a one man campaign to stamp out Christmas. A tussle with Santa lands him in the jail and in hot water with Mary.

=== Series 1 (1990–1991) ===
The episode "Fitba" was recorded in 1990 along with the main block of episodes broadcast that year, but was held over until the summer of 1991 outside Scotland. The broadcast order has often been disputed, with some sources claiming "Holiday" was broadcast as episode 3 and "City of Culture" as episode 6; however, the official DVD release lists the episodes in the following order.

No. overall	No. in series	Title	Directed by	Written by	Original release date
2	1	"Work"	Colin Gilbert	Ian Pattison	27 September 1990
Rab returns home three days late from the butchers, leaving Mary no choice but to move out after years of trouble. Much to his horror, Rab discovers he has to get a job.
3	2	"Rat"	Colin Gilbert	Ian Pattison	4 October 1990
Mary finds a rat in the kitchen, Rab discovers his favourite shop has turned into an art boutique, and a by-election takes place in Govan: Rab votes Conservative.
4	3	"City of Culture"	Colin Gilbert	Ian Pattison	11 October 1990
When Glasgow is named the European City of Culture, the Nesbitts pay the city a visit. However, things don't turned out as planned as Rab and Jamesie start a fight with a Peruvian folk band.
5	4	"Drink"	Colin Gilbert	Ian Pattison	18 October 1990
Rab goes to see his doctor and discovers that if he does not give up drinking within a year, he will die. Not taking any notice of the doctor's orders, he blows his money on booze.
6	5	"Offski"	Colin Gilbert	Ian Pattison	25 October 1990
Rab goes to stay with Mary's cousin Shug, who lives in Sidcup, after finding himself on the run from the police. Gash receives a letter from his girlfriend, and decides to run away to London.
7	6	"Holiday"	Colin Gilbert	Ian Pattison	1 November 1990
The Nesbitt family win a holiday to Benidorm, much to the surprise of Jamesie and Ella. Rab samples some of the local culture, while Jamesie decides to make a move on Mary.
8	7	"Fitba"	Colin Gilbert	Ian Pattison	31 December 1990 (Scotland); 15 July 1991 (UK wide)
Extended episode. Rab takes Matt Fernie to Italy for the World Cup but Matt is taken seriously ill before the final game, Scotland vs Brazil. Jamesie suffers a bout of the 'male menopause'. Guest appearance by Mary Lee.

=== Live Special (1992) ===
Title	Original release date
"Live"	24 January 1992
After returning home from the World Cup late, Rab's family decide they no longer want him. After moving in with Jamesie, Rab tries everything in his power to get himself put in jail.

=== Series 2 (1992) ===
The episodes "Lesson" and "Home" are both extended episodes and run for forty-five minutes. A number of memorable one-time characters appeared in this season; it was in this season that David McKay made his first appearance in the show as the son of Jimbo McGurn, before landing the role of Screech in 1994 and making his first appearance in "Love".

No. overall	No. in series	Title	Directed by	Written by	Original release date
9	1	"Country"	Colin Gilbert	Ian Pattison	14 May 1992
The Nesbitts and the Cotters go away for a holiday to Loch Lomond for the weekend, where Jamesie gets in a spot of trouble with the locals and Rab camps out in the mountains.
10	2	"Lesson"	Colin Gilbert	Ian Pattison	21 May 1992
Extended episode. Rab reminisces about his schooldays after Mary throws him out following a three-month stint in jail, while Ella takes her split with Jamesie worse than expected.
11	3	"Domestic"	Colin Gilbert	Ian Pattison	28 May 1992
Rab and Mary have a domestic, and Gash and Burney are taken into care. Determined to prove they are capable parents, Rab and Mary attend therapy sessions in order to sort their differences.
12	4	"That’s Entertainment"	Colin Gilbert	Ian Pattison	4 June 1992
Jimbo McGurn's release from prison causes problems for Rab and Jamesie, after McGurn finds out that Jamesie has been sleeping with his daughter, he takes to desperate measures.
13	5	"Ethics"	Colin Gilbert	Ian Pattison	11 June 1992
Rab finds himself in the middle of a moral dilemma. After saving a wino from drowning, the man decides to leave sole responsibility of his life in Rab's hands, much to his dismay.
14	6	"Life Has Meaning"	Colin Gilbert	Ian Pattison	18 June 1992
Religion hits the Nesbitt family harder than expected when a group of Warlocks and witches move in next door. Rab becomes determined to prove there is no such thing as Satan.
15	7	"Home"	Colin Gilbert	Ian Pattison	31 December 1992
Extended episode. Mary's cousin Shug and his wife Phoebe come to stay with the Nesbitts for Hogmanay, but Jamesie's hopes for an independent Scotland nearly ruin the party.

=== Series 3 (1993) ===
Series three is the last series to feature Burney Nesbitt (Eric Cullen), who departs after the episode "Right", as none of the Nesbitt family feature in the episode "Cell" aside from Rab himself. This series also featured the last appearance of Sara Corper as Pheobe, as she was replaced by Sarah Crowden in the role in future appearances.

No. overall	No. in series	Title	Directed by	Written by	Original release date
16	1	"Rich"	Colin Gilbert	Ian Pattison	16 November 1993
With Mary critically ill in hospital, Rab takes the boys to Blackpool to take their mind off things. However, Gash and Burney decide to spend the day with their Uncle Shug and Aunt Phoebe.
17	2	"Touch"	Colin Gilbert	Ian Pattison	23 November 1993
Mary gets a new job with a lecherous boss, and Rab begins to fear that Mary may dump him. He turns to Jamesie for advice - a solution which creates more problems than anticipated. In one of his earliest TV roles, David Tennant guest stars as a pre-op trans woman named Davina.
18	3	"Gifted"	Colin Gilbert	Ian Pattison	30 November 1993
Burney is diagnosed as "gifted" by his school teacher and starts to attend art classes at the Govan Art school, which leaves Rab green with jealousy. Gash attempts a ram-raid.
19	4	"Wean"	Colin Gilbert	Ian Pattison	7 December 1993
Ella and Jamesie want to have children - but they are having trouble because Jamesie has been firing blanks. Jamesie asks Rab if he is willing to become a surrogate father for him.
20	5	"Right"	Colin Gilbert	Ian Pattison	14 December 1993
MP Sandy McKean is totally messing up Govan, and Rab decides to do something about it. Meanwhile, Gash has turned into a drug addict, and Burney has turned into a racist bigot.
21	6	"Cell"	Colin Gilbert	Ian Pattison	21 December 1993
Has Rab's night in the cells driven his cellmate to suicide and his police guard to murder? And will Rab finally learn the true error of his ways, or will history repeat itself?

=== Series 4 (1994) ===
Series four saw the introduction of Screech Nesbitt (David McKay) who replaced outgoing character Burney Nesbitt (Eric Cullen). The series also sees the introduction of Isa Nesbitt (Anna Welsh), Rab's mother, who is introduced in episode one but dies in episode two. Series four featured the first two-part story to feature in the show's run, "Love" and "Mother".

No. overall	No. in series	Title	Directed by	Written by	Original release date
22	1	"Love (Part 1)"	Colin Gilbert	Ian Pattison	19 September 1994
Rab finds himself back living with his mother, after being unable to tell Mary that he loves her. Rab's nephew Screech has moved in with the Nesbitts after Burney moves out to go to private school.
23	2	"Mother (Part 2)"	Colin Gilbert	Ian Pattison	26 September 1994
After social security coming sniffing around, Rab is forced to move out and finds himself living rough out on the local dump. However, he soon receives some sad news concerning his mother.
24	3	"Buckfast"	Colin Gilbert	Ian Pattison	3 October 1994
Rab and Jamesie take a spiritual trip to the Buckfast Abbey brewery, but end up running into one of Ella's old flames, Frank. Rab upsets the locals, and Jamesie is converted into a Monk.
25	4	"Test"	Colin Gilbert	Ian Pattison	10 October 1994
Rab is told that he needs to wear glasses after having his eyes tested, and Mary is reluctant to go for another smear test after a nationwide cock-up in which 2,000 tests were incorrectly analysed.
26	5	"Eorpa"	Colin Gilbert	Ian Pattison	17 October 1994
The local TV station gets excited when both Rab and Jamesie are accused of committing murder. A campaign to 'Free the Govan Two' begins, while Rab questions the meaning of police brutality.
27	6	"Further"	Colin Gilbert	Ian Pattison	24 October 1994
Norrie can't find anyone to volunteer for the brewery sponsored charity walk across Scotland, until he mentions free drinks. However, the 95-mile trek seems to be too much for Rab and Jamesie.
28	7	"More"	Colin Gilbert	Ian Pattison	29 December 1994
Gash wants to marry his new girlfriend, Mo, Ella finds herself a new toyboy and kicks Jamesie out on the street, and Andra and Dodie's idea for Gash's stag party gets out of hand.

=== Series 5 (1996) ===
Filming on series five began in 1995, but was not broadcast until 1996; meaning that the show took a year's break and 1995 was the first year that a new episode of Rab C. Nesbitt was not broadcast. Guest stars in this series include Sylvester McCoy, who plays the role of Gash Sr., Rab's long lost older brother who comes to live with him.

No. overall	No. in series	Title	Original release date
29	1	"Affair"	5 January 1996
Rab and Mary's twentieth wedding anniversary is fast approaching, but Rab starts to realise that his marriage is on rocky ground when he finds himself drawn to a seductive therapy teacher.
30	2	"Fuel"	12 January 1996
Mary and Rab take a romantic trip to the Lake District, where Rab becomes an environmental crusader against a local pharmaceutical company after Gash is injured in a chemical explosion.
31	3	"Lottery"	19 January 1996
Rab and Mary are delighted when they win on the football pools - but it doesn't bring them the happiness that they quite expected it to. Meanwhile, Jamesie finds himself dating a teenage girl.
32	4	"Pie"	26 January 1996
Shug finds himself in Govan after being thrown out by Pheobe, and wants to start up his own pie shop. But he doesn't know about the local pie mafia, who don't like outsiders on their turf.
33	5	"Racket"	2 February 1996
The Nesbitts appear on an American-style talk show after being accused of annoying their next door neighbour to death, but Rab soon seizes the opportunity to turn himself into a local celebrity.
34	6	"Father"	9 February 1996
Rab recalls his family history after finding his long lost brother Gash Sr. on the 30th anniversary of his father's death. Painful memories began to reveal the reasons behind Gash's demise.

=== Series 6 (1997) ===
The sixth series of the show was the last to feature David McKay's character Screech, who was written out of the show following McKay's decision to leave. McKay becomes only the second main cast member to depart the series at this point, with Eric Cullen having left the show following the third series in 1993. "Growth" and "Semmitry" become the show's second two-part story.

No. overall	No. in series	Title	Original release date
35	1	"Fast"	1 August 1997
Mary seems strangely calm when she is told that Rab's benefits have been suspended. Rab resorts to dressing himself as a hamburger for a local diner "Happy Burger" in order to pay his way.
36	2	"Wild"	8 August 1997
Rab is spending a lot of time at his newly acquired allotment, which causes Mary to look for her own excitement with an old boyfriend, who cons Rab and Jamesie into holding up a garden centre.
37	3	"Growth (Part 1)"	15 August 1997
After a visit to the doctor, Rab is diagnosed with a malignant cancerous growth and has to undergo chemotherapy. He decides that the best course of action is a hairpiece, much to Mary's dismay.
38	4	"Semmitry (Part 2)"	22 August 1997
Rab is in the hospital cancer ward, and the constant attention of the hospital reverend is starting to get on his nerves. Meanwhile, the Two Ways are planning a wake Govan won't forget.
39	5	"Bulbs"	29 August 1997
Rab joins Jamesie's trip to Amsterdam to supposedly see the bulbfields, but on arrival, Rab finds out that Jamesie is only interested in the red light district. Rab gets his first taste of cannabis.
40	6	"Binge"	5 September 1997
Rab and Jamesie take Gash out on a traditional three-day drinking binge before he marries his latest girlfriend, Natalie, but Jamesie's encounter with a transsexual leaves Gash undecided.

=== Series 7 (1998) ===
The seventh series introduces Gash's new girlfriend, Bridie (Nicola Park), as a replacement for the outgoing Screech (David McKay), who departed after series six. The series touches on a range of topical subjects, including a new government coming into power, prescription drugs and mugging, none of which the series had discussed before.

No. overall	No. in series	Title	Original release date	SCT viewers (millions)
41	1	"New"	21 August 1998	3.70
The thought of a new Labour government and a new daughter-in-law makes Rab start to feel his age. Gash's marriage is on the rocks, and the involvement of her mad twin brother doesn't help.
42	2	"Cocktails"	28 August 1998	3.23
The relief barman at the pub is an ex-Broadmoor resident called 'Mad Dog', who quickly leaves Rab and Jamesie struggling with a problem involving 'fashionable drugs' remedied as 'cocktails'.
43	3	"Duel"	4 September 1998	2.73
Rab goes on a booze cruise to Millport with the regulars of the Two Ways, but the cruise soon begins to open up some old wounds for him regarding his childhood. Jamesie has an affair.
44	4	"Property"	11 September 1998	2.94
Mary is sexually assaulted by a yob on her way home from the supermarket, a fact which Rab is unable to come to terms with. Rab later discovers that Bridie is working as a prostitute.
45	5	"Community"	18 September 1998	3.16
The Govan population are devastated at the news that country singer Marilou Devine has been killed, except for Rab - who has just been sentenced to two hundred hours of community service.
46	6	"Back (Part 1)"	25 September 1998	3.46
Rab is suffering from a bad back, leaving Mary in an emotional and vulnerable state. Whilst in the midst of a split with Ella, Jamesie takes his chance to live his dream of being with Mary.

=== Series 8 (1999) ===
Series eight follows on directly from where series seven left off, and was the last regular series to be broadcast before the show's revival in 2008. This series was the second series to feature Bridie (Nicola Park), who later reprises her role for the 2010 series. The character of Tweety is also portrayed by a different actor, following Ian Bustard's departure from the role.

No. overall	No. in series	Title	Original release date	SCT viewers (millions)
47	1	"Heat (Part 2)"	14 May 1999	2.71
After serving a jail sentence for setting fire to the house because Mary had gone off with Jamesie, Rab gets a job as a dishwasher - but still plans to get his revenge on his pal.
48	2	"Commons"	21 May 1999	3.09
MP Tony Welthorpe gets more than he bargained for after he agrees to swap lifestyles with Rab, after being challenged to see if he can live on state benefits for a month in Govan.
49	3	"Night"	28 May 1999	2.80
Rab can't get to sleep because of his bad back, and matters are made worse by the arrival of Jamesie, who is hiding from a disgruntled husband with a shotgun who is looking for revenge.
50	4	"Fruit"	4 June 1999	2.70
Gash's girlfriend Bridie is due to give birth to Rab's first grandchild Peaches. After Rab falls asleep when taking Peaches out in the pram, the baby goes missing. Jamesie helps solve the mystery.
51	5	"Bug"	11 June 1999	2.47
After Norrie's attempts to encourage the Two Ways regulars to engage in regular exercise, Andra suffers a heart attack. A visit to the doctor to cure his feelings of restlessness proves pointless, so Rab decides to explore his spiritual side in the local park with the help of a group of local tramps.
52	6	"Trips"	18 June 1999	2.20
Rab & Jamesie's attempts at trying to organize the invitations to Barney Feeney's birthday booze-up are left to much dismay when Barney is found to have lost his mind following an accident.

=== Christmas Special (2008) ===
No. overall	No. in series	Title	Original release date	SCT viewers (millions)
53	1	"Clean"	23 December 2008	3.70
Rab is a changed man, having ditched alcohol, found religion and even discovered the cooker - but Jamesie has other plans. Mary has a new career as a cleaner, and is dusting for an old flame.

=== Series 9 (2010) ===
The ninth series is the only series not to feature Dodie (Iain McColl), who was unavailable for filming. The character of Peaches is introduced into the series, and following Andrew Fairlie's decision not to reprise the role of Gash, Iain Robertson is recast in the role. Nicola Park reprises her role as Bridie, the mother of Gash's only daughter.

No. overall	No. in series	Title	Original release date	SCT viewers (millions)
54	1	"Heal"	21 January 2010	2.28
Rab and Mary welcome their son Gash back to the family home and become reacquainted with their granddaughter Peaches. Jamesie shows just how far he'll push it to get a woman into bed.
55	2	"Signal"	28 January 2010	2.02
When a mobile phone mast appears in Govan, Rab turns rabble-rouser to fire up the community into fighting back. It's driving everyone up the pole, but is it really damaging their health?
56	3	"Candy"	4 February 2010	1.94
Rab embraces his feminine side as part of his most outrageous social security scam yet. Meanwhile, Mary does her best to come to terms with her husband's new-found womanly presence.
57	4	"Passion"	11 February 2010	<1.91
Rab decides to play cupid for Gash, hooking him up with barmaid Camille. However, Camille is the new-found subject of Jamesie's affections, which leads to more heartache for Gash.
58	5	"Muse"	18 February 2010	1.66
Rab finds himself at a posh supper for namesake Rabbie Burns, where he locks horns with filth magnet Saunders McClure, a slimeball with designs on Mary's cleaning company, the House Mice.
59	6	"Bottle"	25 February 2010	1.74
An old woman on her way to the Pearly Gates discovers a couple of unlikely carers by her bedside. While Rab racks his brains to offer crumbs of comfort, Jamesie is dogged by disaster.

=== Series 10 (2011) ===
Series ten is the final regular series to be broadcast to date. Series ten saw the return of Dodie (Iain McColl) in a very minor role, while Gash, Gash's daughter Peaches and ex-girlfriend Bridie all appear in very minor roles. This series features a number of guest appearances, including Richard E. Grant, Shane MacGowan, John Sergeant, Susan Boyle and Hamish Clark.

No. overall	No. in series	Title	Original release date	SCT viewers (millions)
60	1	"Broke"	5 October 2011	2.32
Rab returns home from the pub to find that Mary has kidnapped Chingford Steel, the government Minister for Work. Rab uses the situation as his chance to discover the heights of 'fame'.
61	2	"Fugue"	12 October 2011	1.92
Mary and Ella form a girl band known as 'The Scrubbers', while Rab and Jamesie set themselves up as 'Hunks for Hire' - sexy male cleaners for bored, lonely housewives - and randy pensioners.
62	3	"Cuts"	19 October 2011	<1.79
Jamesie discovers he's about to become a father, and Ella doesn't take the news very well. Mary accidentally stabs Rab with a bread knife, and Rab and Jamesie end up in adjoining hospital beds.
63	4	"Fight"	26 October 2011	<1.80
Rab decides to fight back when council cuts threaten to close the local drop-in centre, re-inventing himself as 'Rab of Ark' and threatening to burn himself at the stake unless he gets what he wants.
64	5	"Role"	2 November 2011	<1.96
Rab is chosen by his granddaughter to be a role model for her class at school, only to discover that her teacher is a fellow member of his AA group. Jamesie ends up in a crack house.
65	6	"Stool"	9 November 2011	<1.99
Gash arrives home following a stint in rehab, and decides to give up drink in order to set a good example to his daughter. However, Jamesie's encouragement causes him to fall off the wagon.
66	7	"John"	9 November 2011	<1.99
Rab takes part in a hard-hitting interview with John Sergeant, whose latest project is to investigate the lifestyle of the long-term unemployed in an effort to change social opinions and stereotypes.

=== New Year Special (2014) ===
No. overall	No. in series	Title	Original release date	SCT viewers (millions)
67	1	"Hoodie"	2 January 2014	2.32
Rab fights the recently enforced bedroom tax by becoming a modern day Robin Hood, turning outlaw with his band of 'Merry Men' - Jamesie and Andra - stealing from the rich to give to the poor.
