= Nicola Park =

Scottish actress and performer

- Born: 6 January 1972 (age 54); Clydebank, West Dunbartonshire, Scotland
- Occupations: Actress; Performer
- Years active: 1996–present
- Children: Jude Olivia

Nicola Park (born 6 January 1972) is a Scottish actress and performer. She is best known for her role on the long-running television series Rab C. Nesbitt.

== Early life ==
Park was born in 1972 in Dumbarton, a town in West Dunbartonshire, Scotland which borders to the northwest of Glasgow.

== Career ==
Park commenced her acting career in 1996. She received her first role on the short-lived television sitcom Atletico Partick, which was created by Ian Pattison. What followed was the role of Bridie on the sitcom Rab C. Nesbitt, in which she was introduced in season five as Gash's girlfriend's sister but eventually gets pregnant to Gash and gives birth to a baby girl, Peaches. Park played the role of Bridie until the series ended in 1999 at the end of season eight, however, she did return for seasons nine and ten when the series was later revived in 2008. Before she received the role as Bridie, she played another character on the series, that of Rena, in one episode as Rab's sister in a flashback sequence. In 1999 and 2000, Park appeared in three separate guesting roles of the Scottish children's television series Hububb, with Elaine C. Smith, her co-star on Rab C. Nesbitt.

She appeared as Widow Twankey in Aladdin at the Pavilion Theatre (Glasgow) in 2022–23.

== Personal life ==
Park has had several brushes with death. While seven months pregnant, Park collapsed and was rushed to hospital where she was diagnosed with pre-eclampsia, in which her heart stopped and her baby's life was in danger. The condition left her on a life support machine. In 2003, she almost died giving birth to her son, Jude.

In September 2004, more tragedy followed as Park was again rushed to hospital where it was discovered she had pancreatitis. Again, she was left on a life support machine and remained in hospital for seven weeks. Throughout her time in hospital between 2003 and 2004, Park underwent nine operations and is now suffering from diabetes.

Park was involved in two car accidents. In 2005, she suffered from a broken nose and wrist, and severe whiplash following an accident. She was involved in a collision on the Great Western Road, in which she was saved by the car's air bags and having a bump to the head.

== Filmography ==
Year	Title	Role	Notes
1996–2011	Rab C. Nesbitt	Rena	Series 5, Episode 6: "Father"
1996–2011	Rab C. Nesbitt	Bridie	Series 7–10 (recurring role, 16 episodes)
1996	Atletico Partick	Sally	Series 1 (recurring role, 4 episodes)
1997	The Baldy Man	Various roles	Series 2 (guest role, 3 episodes)
1999–2000	Hububb	Mrs Bonaparte	Series 3, Episode 10: "Rub a Dub Bubb"
1999–2000	Hububb	Jemima	Series 3, Episode 12: "The Bubbulator"
1999–2000	Hububb		Series 4, Episode 6: "Fly Pie"
1999–2000	Hububb	Crofter	Series 4, Episode 6: "Conquer Leserest"
2018	Starcache	Miss Bagshaw	Feature film
