= Paul-James Corrigan =

Scottish actor

- Born: Bellshill, Scotland, United Kingdom
- Occupation: Actor
- Years active: 2007–present
- Notable work: River City (2011-2016); Gary Tank Commander (2009-2012); Rab C Nesbitt

Paul-James Corrigan is a Scottish stage and screen actor. He is best known for his roles as Adam in Gary Tank Commander and as Stevie Burns in River City. He is known for his work with s1jobs, after fronting a TV campaign beginning in 2014 'Davie Knows'. The ad drew over 1.6 million views on YouTube.

In 2015, he appeared on stage opposite River City co-star Frank Gallagher in Butterfly at the Oran Mor in Glasgow.

== Filmography ==
=== Film ===
Year	Title	Role	Notes
2014	Nice Guys Come Last	Baz	Short

=== Television ===
Year	Title	Role	Notes
2007	Legit	PP	Guest
2009	Magic Grandad	Private MacGregor	Guest
2010	Rab C. Nesbitt	Youth 2	1 episode
2009 - 2011	Gary Tank Commander	Adam	Series Regular
2011 - 2016	River City	Stevie Burns	Series Regular
2014 - 2015	S1 Jobs	Davie Knows	Advert
2016	Still Game	Gaz	1 Episode

=== Theatre ===
- The Wolves in the Walls (National Theatre of Scotland/ Improbable)
- Carthage Must Be Destroyed (Traverse Theatre, Edinburgh)
- Risk (Macrobert, Stirling)
- Free Fall (7:84 Theatre Company)
- Gobbo (National Theatre of Scotland Ensemble)
- Mancub (National Theatre of Scotland Ensemble/ Vanishing Point)
- James and the Giant Peach (Citizens Theatre, Glasgow)
- No Mean City (Citizens Theatre, Glasgow)
- The Borrowers (Citizens Theatre, Glasgow)
- Aladdin (King's Theatre, Glasgow)
