= Snoddy =

2002 Scottish TV sitcom

- Genre: Sitcom
- Created by: Johnny Crawford
- Written by: Johnny Crawford
- Directed by: Ron Bain
- Starring: Gregor Fisher; Dawn Steele; Hugh Ross; Gavin Mitchell; James Young; Brian Pettifer
- Composer: Dave Hurricane
- Original language: English
- No. of series: 1
- No. of episodes: 6

Production
- Executive producer: Ewan Angus
- Producer: Colin Gilbert
- Production location: Scotland
- Editor: John Brooks
- Running time: 30 minutes
- Production company: The Comedy Unit

Original release
- Network: BBC One Scotland
- Release: 13 March – 17 April 2002

Snoddy was a six-part Scottish television sitcom, written and created by Johnny Crawford, that first broadcast on BBC One Scotland on 13 March 2002. The series, which aired at 10:35pm on Wednesdays, starred Gregor Fisher of Rab C Nesbitt fame as DCI Samuel J. Snoddy, the head of Scotland's Elite Crime Squad, who is obsessed with spending more time playing golf abroad rather than fighting crimes.

Only a single series of six episodes was broadcast, and the series was never shown outside of Scotland. The series was regarded as unsuccessful and was axed by BBC bosses following poor ratings. The series was heavily promoted in and around the Glasgow area, with a number of billboard posters portraying the tagline "it's a Hotel Oscar Oscar Tango of a show” being put up around the city. Notably, the series has never been made available on DVD.

== Production ==
Snoddy was Johnny Crawford's first television writing credit, eventually being produced by The Comedy Unit for BBC One Scotland after first being offered to Channel 4 in 1998. Producer Colin Gilbert described Snoddy as Crawford's "rich, refreshing, and tangential left-field vision". Scripts for the series were subject to redrafting, with Gilbert commenting, "It's been a challenge for us to control everything into half-hour episodes that make narrative sense and are still funny. John's certainly had to work at making Snoddy just that bit easier for folk to follow, re-writing and re-writing, but he's become a much better writer as he's gone along."

== Cast ==
- Gregor Fisher as DCI Samuel J. Snoddy
- Dawn Steele as Laura Bonney
- Hugh Ross as Chief Inspector Chalmers
- Gavin Mitchell as DC Jackie Murdoch
- James Young as DC Wilson
- Brian Pettifer as Professor Baxter
- Tom Urie as Captain Ortego
- Alan McCafferty as PC MacCubbin
- Billy Riddoch as PC Greig

== Episodes ==
No.	Title	Directed by	Written by	Original release date	Viewers (millions)
1	"Get Carty"	Unknown	Unknown	13 March 2002	N/A
2	"Sky Where the Sea Should Be"	Ron Bain	Johnny Crawford	20 March 2002	N/A
Professor Baxter is hospitalised following an assault and uses an unusual method of communication to provide a description of his attackers. Snoddy tries to help out former police officer Ally Black (Andy Gray) who finds himself homeless after being robbed whilst using a virtual reality machine. Meanwhile, Chief Inspector Chalmers (Hugh Ross) orders the Elite Crime Squad to investigate an unsolved cold case involving the theft of a rare malt whisky, and takes the team on a tour of a local brewery run by Keith Malarkey (Vince Handley). During the tour, Snoddy makes an unexpected connection between the two cases.
3	TBA	Unknown	Unknown	27 March 2002	N/A
4	"Cyborg Polis"	Ron Bain	Johnny Crawford	3 April 2002	N/A
5	"B.A.W.S."	Ron Bain	Johnny Crawford	10 April 2002	N/A
6	TBA	Unknown	Unknown	17 April 2002	N/A
