= Only Child =

An only child is a person who does not have any siblings, neither biological nor adopted.

Only Child may also refer to:

- Only Child (novel), a novel by Jack Ketchum
- Only Child, a 2020 album by Sasha Sloan
- Only Child (TV series), a BBC TV series
