= Stuart Bowman (actor) =

Scottish actor

- Years active: 1992-Present

Stuart Bowman is a Scottish actor. He is known for playing head of MI5 Stephen Hunter-Dunn in the BBC's Bodyguard, his regular appearances as Sergeant Thomson in Gary: Tank Commander, and for his portrayal of Alexandre Bontemps in the Canal+ series Versailles.

== Early life ==
Bowman was born in Dundee and brought up in Fife and Clackmannanshire.

== Career ==
Bowman was an established character actor on television, and his role as Bontemps increased his public profile. It necessitated living in Paris during the three years production of Versailles. He said that he was unregretful the conclusion of the series. "With Bontemps I don't think there was much I would be able to do with him beyond season three...So, for me, it felt right and natural that it was finishing there."

== Filmography ==
Key
†	Denotes works that have not yet been released

=== Film ===
Year	Title	Role	Notes
1996	The Big Picnic	Russell Enoch	TV film
1998	The Wisdom of Crocodiles	Car Crash Mechanic	
2000	The Dreamer	Willis	Short film
2003	Young Adam	Black Street Pub Man	
2003	The Deal	Journalist #1	TV film
2007	Kitchen	Donald McQuillip	TV film
2014	Macbeth	Macduff	
2015	Slow West	Gordon Shaw	
2015	Sunset Song	Alex Mutch	
2018	Holy F__k	Father MacNally	Short film
2018	In the Fall	Archibald	Short film
2021	Eight for Silver	Saul	
2024	Man and Witch: The Dance of a Thousand Steps	King	
2024	Here	Businessman	

=== Television ===
Year	Title	Role	Notes
1992	Taggart	P.C. McGann	Episode: "Double Exposure"
1995	The Bill	Dennis Hepworth	Episode: "Strictly Personal"
1996	Taggart	Gary Black	Episode: "Angel Eyes"
1997	Thief Takers	DS Wallis	Episode: "Black Mist"
1997	The Bill	Mick Bessant	Episode: "Going Down"
1999	Life Support	Robbie Sutherland	Episode: "Soul and Conscience"
2000	London's Burning	Hostage Negotiator	Episode: "Series 12, Episode 10"
2001	Holby City	Jack Moore	Episode: "Shadow of Doubt"
2002	Attachments	Steve	Episode: "Tooting Broadway"
2003	A Touch of Frost	Russell	Episode: "Hidden Truths"
2003	Red Cap	RQMS Rufus Webb	Episode: "Esprit de Corps"
2003	Taggart	Frank Calder	Episode: "Bad Blood"
2005	The Golden Hour	PC Phil Carroll	Mini-series, 1 episode
2007	Coming Up	Fat Pat	Episode: "Brussels"
2007	The Bill	Carl Fraser	Episode: "Diamonds Are Deadly"
2007	Dear Green Place	Crammond	Episodes: "Bandstand" & "Uppers and Downers"
2008	Taggart	Ewan Burton	Episode: "Genesis"
2008	Doctors	David Mason	Episode: "The One"
2009	Minder	Chan Donovan	Episode: "A Matter of Life and Debt"
2009	True Horror	Peter Stubbe	Episode: "Werewolf"
2009–2012	Gary: Tank Commander	Sergeant Thomson	Series regular, 17 episodes
2010	Rab C. Nesbitt	Graeme Taplow	Episode: "Signal"
2010	Taggart	Adam Turner	Episode: "Abuse of Trust"
2011	Doctors	Neville Johns	Episode: "Because You're Mine"
2013	Case Histories	Steve	Episode: "Started Early, Took My Dog"
2014	Doctors	John Dow	Episode: "Blink"
2014	Edge of Heaven	Pat the Tattooist	Episode: "Series 1, Episode 2"
2015	The Musketeers	Bruno Lemaitre	Episode: "An Ordinary Man"
2015	Suspects	Neil Jenkins	Episode: "Victim"
2015–2018	Versailles	Alexandre Bontemps	Series regular, 30 episodes
2016	The Increasingly Poor Decisions of Todd Margaret	Police Officer Tickles	Episode: "The Increasingly Poor Decisions of Todd Margaret"
2018	Bodyguard	Stephen Hunter-Dunn	Mini-series, 5 episodes
2018	Lore	Sholto MacDonald	Episode: "Burke and Hare: In The Name of Science"
2019	Still Game	Andy Forrester	Episode “Hitched”
2020	Deadwater Fell	Dr. Mark Denham-Johnson	Mini-series, 3 episodes
2021	The Serpent	Graeme Stanton	Mini-series, 2 episodes
2021	Alex Rider	Sean Palmer	Episode: "Series 2, Episode 8"
2021–2023	Guilt	Roy Lynch	Recurring role, 5 episodes
2021–2025	Grantchester	Bishop Aubrey Gray	Recurring role, 8 episodes
2022	The Pact	Jerry	Episode: "Series 2, Episode 2"
2022	The Control Room	Ian Maver	Mini-series; 3 episodes
2022	Karen Pirie	Detective Chief Superintendent Jimmy Lawson Snr	Series regular; 3 episodes
2023	The Chemistry of Death	Iain Kinross	Recurring role; 4 episodes
2024	Rebus	Ger Cafferty	
2024	The Lord of the Rings: The Rings of Power	Barduk	Recurring role; 2 episodes
2024	Only Child	Rod	Recurring role; 2 episodes
2025	Dept. Q	Terry Dundee	Recurring role; 3 episodes
2026	Maya †	Tony	Post-production
TBA	Counsels †	TBA	Post-production

=== Theatre ===
Year	Title	Role	Venue	Notes
1993	A Scots Quair	Ewan Tavendale	Assembly Hall, Edinburgh	Alastair Cording's adaptation of Lewis Grassic Gibbon's trilogy
1995	Trainspotting	Begbie	Citizens Theatre, Glasgow	
1997	Cat on a Hot Tin Roof	Brick	Dundee Repertory Theatre, Dundee	
1998	The Homecoming	Teddy	Citizens Theatre, Glasgow	
2002	The Importance of Being Earnest	Jack Worthing (Ernest)	Citizens Theatre, Glasgow	
2002	Blasted	Ian	Citizens Theatre, Glasgow	
2004	Knives in Hens	Pony Williams	Royal Exchange, Manchester	
2007	Henry V	Constable of France	Royal Exchange, Manchester	
2007	A Conversation	Jack Manning	Royal Exchange, Manchester	
2008	Killing Brando	Daniel	Òran Mór, Glasgow	
2009	Peter Pan	Captain Hook	Royal Lyceum Theatre, Edinburgh	
2009	Lucky Box	A	Òran Mór, Glasgow	
2009	An Argument About Sex	Charlie	Tramway, Glasgow & Traverse Theatre, Edinburgh	
2010	The Curse of the Demeter	Captain Ripelski/Dracula	Scotland Tour	
2011	Watching the Detective	Detective	Òran Mór, Glasgow & Traverse Theatre, Edinburgh	
2011	Pygmalion	Porter	Garrick Theatre, London	
2012	The Marriage of Figaro	The Chief	Royal Lyceum Theatre, Edinburgh	
2013	Wee Andy	Surgeon	The Pleasance, Edinburgh	
2013	Macbeth	Macduff	Shakespeare's Globe, London	
2013	Fleeto	Police Officer	The Pleasance, Edinburgh	
2015	hamlet is dead. no gravity	Father	Arcola Theatre, London	stylized as lowercase by playwright
