= Donald Dawson =

American politician

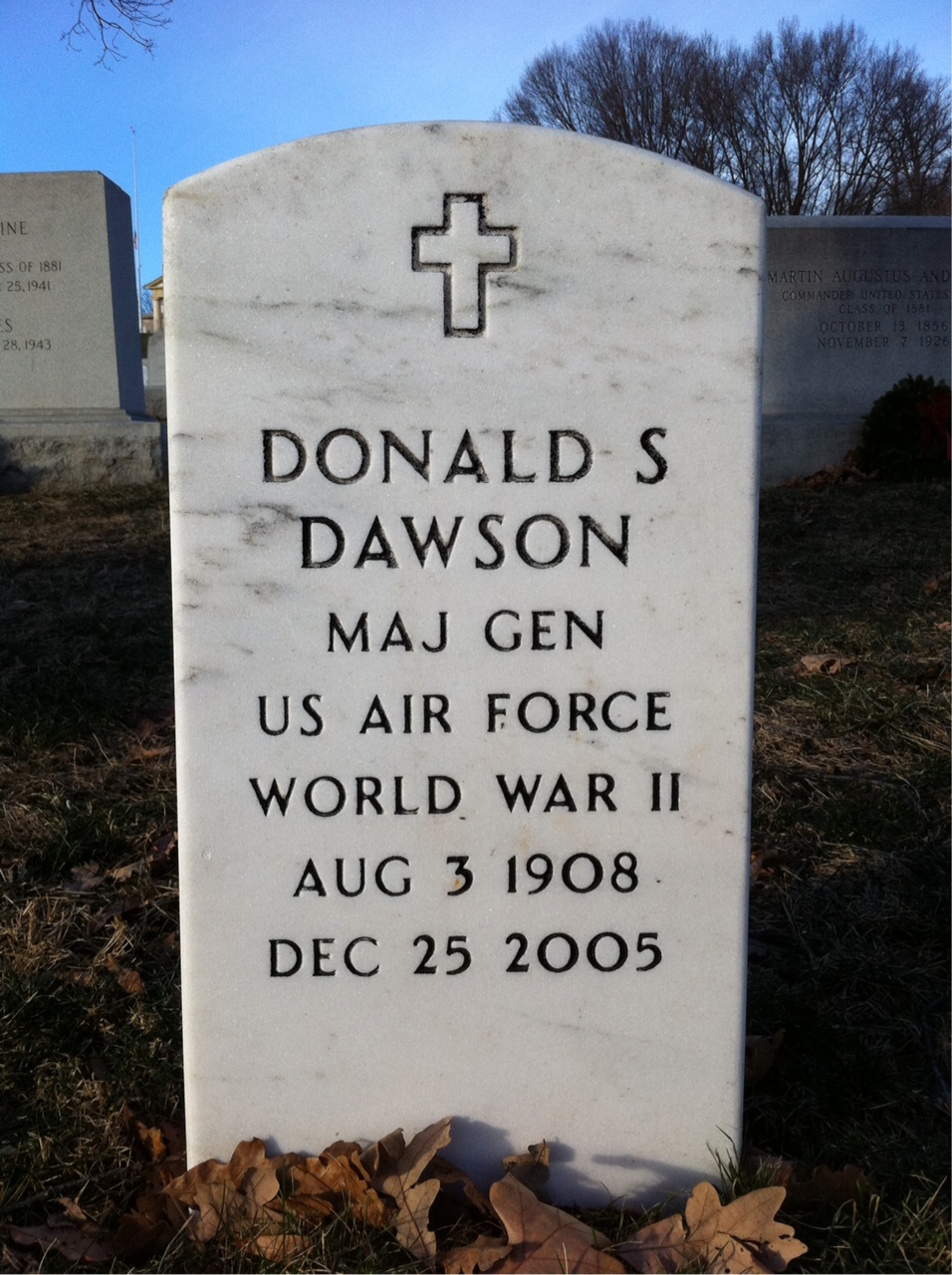
Grave at Arlington National Cemetery

Donald Shelton Dawson (August 3, 1908 – December 25, 2005) was a 20th-century American lawyer, politician, and military officer, best remembered as the presidential aide who marshaled Harry S. Truman's crucial whistle-stop tour in the 1948 election campaign, so was perhaps the first modern American political advance man, able to gauge political climate and provide appropriate advice.

== Background ==
Donald Shelton Dawson was born on August 3, 1908, in El Dorado Springs, Missouri. He graduated from the University of Missouri in 1930 and received his law degree from George Washington University in 1938, while working.

== Career ==
=== Government service ===
Around 1933, Dawson began to serve as an examiner for the Reconstruction Finance Corporation (RFC); in 1939, he became its director.

During World War II, he served in the U.S. Army Air Forces through 1946.

In 1946, he returned to government service as a close aid to U.S. President Harry S. Truman.

Of how he organized Truman's famous whistle-stop tour, Dawson recounted in 1992:

My job was to be a jump ahead, getting kids out of school early, finding free buses, whatever it took... When the president caught up with me at each stop, I'd brief him on the local situation, and he'd quickly adapt his direct comments. His spur-of-the-moment stuff was so good. He always wanted to talk about things the people wanted to know. Wonderful.... If the boss saw 20 people out of the window, he'd stop the train... The back platform of the train is where he really hit the people. Off the cuff, he was the best. And he was never afraid of politics.

In 1947, he chaired the White House Loyalty Review Board.

In 1951, Dawson found himself caught up in congressional inquiries into the RFC and its board with regard to jobs and loans; he testified before a committee chaired by U.S. Senator J. W. Fulbright. Dawson faced no criminal charges and continued to work at the White House.

=== Private law practice ===
In 1953, he formed the law offices of Dawson, Griffin, Pickens, where he was a senior partner. In 1968, he continued in that role as the firm changed principals and became Dawson, Riddell, Holroyd, Taylor, and Davis. In 1980, he left the firm to work in his own practice.

He retired from the United States Air Force Reserve as a major general in 1970.

== Personal and death ==
Dawson was married three times. He married Alva Ansley and had one daughter, Diana Star Dawson Coyner; they divorced. He married Ilona Massey (June 16, 1910 – August 20, 1974) a Hungarian film, stage, and radio performer, who predeceased him. In 1975, he married Virginia J. Friedland. He had a daughter and a son.

He served as president of the Institute for National and International Affairs at the Truman Library. He supported the Humane Society, the College of the Virgin Islands, the Dwight D. Eisenhower Society, American Friends of Jamaica, and the American Arthritis and Rheumatism Foundation.

Dawson died age 97 on Sunday, December 25, 2005, Christmas Day, at his home in Bethesda, Maryland, and he was buried at Arlington National Cemetery near second his wife.
