= Gary: Tank Commander =

- Starring: Greg McHugh
- Country of origin: Scotland
- Original language: English
- No. of series: 3
- No. of episodes: 18 (list of episodes)

Production
- Running time: approx. 30 minutes
- Production company: The Comedy Unit

Original release
- Network: BBC One Scotland; BBC Two; BBC Scotland
- Release: 21 October 2009 – 17 October 2012

Gary: Tank Commander is a BAFTA award-winning Scottish sitcom, written and created by Greg McHugh, and produced by the Comedy Unit. The show originated in 2008 as a one-off pilot for More4, under the title Gary's War. A full series was subsequently commissioned and broadcast on BBC Two Scotland in December 2009, with the programme moving to BBC One Scotland for the second series in January 2011. Originally broadcast in Scotland only, in the summer of 2011 the series received a UK-wide screening on BBC Three.

McHugh, who is also the screenwriter, plays the eponymous character, Gary McLintoch (the tank commander), a corporal in the fictional 104th Royal Tank Regiment of the British Army. He based the character on an old friend of his from Lochgilphead who was in the RAF, Big Stu Hutch. Filming for the third series began in April 2012.

== Plot ==
Each episode is about the lives of Gary and his three British Army friends after they have returned home to Callander from military deployments abroad. The first series follows the quartet's service in Iraq, while the second takes place after their time in Afghanistan.

== Production ==
=== Locations ===
Filming locations have included East Kilbride's Territorial Army (TA) Centre, Walcheren Barracks in Maryhill, Garelochhead Training Camp and the drill hall of the Glasgow and Strathclyde Universities Officer Training Corps. Clydebank has also featured as the "town centre" (episodes 1 and 3) and a location in Kirkintilloch was used for the Iraq army camp scenes (apparently, a section of land and a human-made hole were employed), both appearing in the first season.

The second series was again filmed at East Kilbride TA Centre and Maryhill, with Cambuslang's Dechmont ranges included. Locations also included the small village of Milton of Campsie, most notably the old railway line, used in the storyline that features the scattering of Gary's mother's ashes. For the second season's Afghanistan scenes, Hughes revealed in 2011 that filming was undertaken in Scotland.

=== Language ===
Most of the main characters, especially Gary, occasionally use Scots when speaking, giving rise to some humorous situations throughout the show. A notable example occurs in series 1, episode 3 ("The General"), when a visiting American general struggles to appropriately use the term "ken" ("know" or "understand"). The use of Scots has not hindered the accessibility of the show to a broader English-speaking audience.

== Format ==
The original pilot was filmed as a mockumentary, with interviews, archive news material, YouTube-style videos and "fly-on-the-wall" footage following Gary's return home from Iraq. For the series, the show moved towards a traditional sitcom format, although it retained the use of interspersed interviews and video clips.

=== Interviews ===
Each episode contains several scenes where Gary is interacting with an unseen interviewer regarding a topic from the respective episode. The interviews are usually composed of Gary's idle thoughts and they help viewers to understand Gary. Occasionally, words or phrases (but rarely complete sentences) are subtitled in these interviews for emphasis. These subtitles are often presented with the use of subtle kinetic typography.

=== Video clips ===
Each episode commences with a YouTube-style video clip (with an accompanying time meter) showing the soldiers and their antics whilst in Iraq (series one) or Afghanistan (series two) and further segments are spread throughout the episode. The clips are usually independent of the episode's plot but display the soldiers' sense of humour, creativity with equipment and their boredom during deployment.

=== Running gags ===
- Gary's insistence on pretending to be a company's representative when answering the phone.
- The Officer Commanding (OC)'s inability to finish a sentence or remember names.
- Sergeant Thomson's sycophancy with the Officer Commanding.
- Charlie stating trivial information, only to be told how boring he is.
- Gary's occasional inability to understand jokes involving certain swear words.
- Julie's incompetent driving.
- Gary refusing to address the chef in the barracks by his real name (Jeff), preferring to refer to him as "Chef".

== Main cast ==
Actor/Actress	Character	Occupation/Rank	Notes
Greg McHugh	Gary McLintoch	Corporal	
Robert Jack	Jacko Jackson	Lance-Corporal	
Scott Fletcher	Charlie Smith	Private	
Paul-James Corrigan	Adam Kenning	Private	Series 1 & 2
James Rottger	Mickey Millar	Private	Series 3
Stuart Bowman	Sergeant Thomson	Troop Sergeant	
Miles Jupp	Sebastian Fanshaw	Captain (Officer Commanding)	
Leah MacRae	Julie Jackson	Bakery worker; Jacko's sister	
Callum Cuthbertson	Martin McLintoch	Gary's father	Recurring
James Allenby-Kirk	Jeff the Chef	Chef	Recurring

== List of episodes ==
=== Pilot (2008) ===
- Gary's War: A 24-minute short film originally shown on More4. Fresh back from a tour of duty in Iraq, Corporal Gary McLintoch returns to the Bannockburn housing estate he grew up in, as he recollects events from Iraq and gives his own unique take on the build-up to and aftermath of the Iraq War.

=== Series 1 (2009) ===
- Episode 1: Be the Best: Gary returns from Iraq one day late after missing his connecting flight from Cyprus, and immediately gets posted to a recruiting stand in the Clydebank shopping centre. While he takes a break, Julie, Jacko's sister and the only person to welcome him back at the airport, comes looking for him and inadvertently signs up to join the army.
- Episode 2: Green Gods: The fire brigade goes on strike and the Army have to step in as a stop-gap using a vintage Green Goddess with out-of-date equipment. They long for the excitement of a call-out to break the monotonous job and test their firefighting abilities, but find it is their people skills which are not up to the task.
- Episode 3: The General: A US Army general visits under the pretext of examining the British Army in barracks, but is more interested in a free holiday and tracing his assumed Scottish roots.
- Episode 4: The Great Debate: Gary takes part in a debate about the Iraq War at the University of St Andrews against an anti-war student, organised by the OC's annoying brother. (The scenes set in the University of St Andrews were actually filmed in the University of Glasgow.)
- Episode 5: In the Field: Gary agrees to help his father by buying a cooker for him and collecting it in the tank whilst on exercise. Despite the show's name, this is the first appearance of the tank (portrayed by an Abbot self-propelled gun) which Gary commands.
- Episode 6: Stagging On: Gary spends his birthday on guard duty. Charlie starts a rumour about himself. Guest appearance from Kevin Bridges.
- Episode 7: Best of...: Compilation episode broadcast over a year after episodes 1–6.

=== Series 2 (2011) ===
- Episode 1: Checkout: The squad are returning from Afghanistan but miss their flight.
- Episode 2: Tank Goodness: While transporting a tank back to the barracks, the boys defy orders by stopping off at a service station for a bit of breakfast, only to find the tank missing when they finish. A frantic search ensues.
- Episode 3: Too Many Chefs: Gary and the boys must help prepare an important dinner for the Captain, exasperated by a drunk Sergeant Thompson.
- Episode 4: Mum's the Word: Gary and his father are finding a suitable place to scatter the ashes of his mother.
- Episode 5: Climate Control: Gary and the boys patrol a Climate Control meeting which Barack Obama is attending. They also run into big bunnies, which are actually people in rabbit suits. (This episode is currently not included on BBC iPlayer).
- Episode 6: Star Wars: Gary and his team take part in an audition to be the faces of an army recruiting advert, to get out of a stores-check, but all does not go smoothly.

=== Series 3 (2012) ===
- Episode 1: Shape Up: Gary has to work on his fitness and chip addiction if he is to avoid failing a third fitness test which would result in his demotion.
- Episode 2: Good Exercise: While on a training exercise, Gary is offered a job by Captain Fanshaw which isn't all it is cracked up to be.
- Episode 3: Bad Cammy: After being framed for many acts Gary must confront his old nemesis and prove his innocence.
- Episode 4: The Big Cuts Are the Biggest: Gary shows an MP (guest star Jack Docherty) around after Sgt Thomson is injured, but fails to stick to the agenda.
- Episode 5: Achtung Charlie: Charlie decides to marry a German woman he has known for a day but Gary accidentally ruins the perfect marriage.
- Episode 6: Spooky Dooky: Gary's Halloween celebrations are overshadowed by a gypsy fortune-teller's ominous prediction.

=== Special (2016) ===
- Election Special: Gary's back and he wants to help everyone to get to know politicians: Nicola Sturgeon, Kezia Dugdale, Ruth Davidson, Willie Rennie, Patrick Harvie and David Coburn before the election.

== Reception ==
Concerns arose regarding the show's portrayal of British Army soldiers and the offence it may cause Scottish viewers. McHugh subsequently dismissed these worries, stating that, "We hear lots about the death of troops, sadly, but we never hear about the more human side or the lighter side". The concerns were proven to be unfounded and the programme was re-commissioned by the BBC, thereafter returning for a second series.

== See also ==
- BBC Scotland
