= Gregor Fisher =

Scottish comedian and actor (born 1953)

- Born: 22 December 1953 (age 72); Menstrie, Clackmannanshire, Scotland
- Education: Royal Scottish Academy of Music and Drama
- Occupations: Actor, comedian
- Years active: 1977–present
- Spouse: Victoria Burton
- Children: 3

Gregor Fisher (born 22 December 1953) is a Scottish comedian and actor. He is best known for his portrayal of the title character in the comedy series Rab C. Nesbitt (1988–2014), a role he had played since the show's first episode. He has also had roles in films such as Without a Clue (1988), Love Actually (2003), The Merchant of Venice (2004) and Whisky Galore! (2016). In 2024, Fisher was cast as Ken Pritchard in the BBC Scotland sitcom Only Child (2024–present).

== Early life ==
Fisher was born in Menstrie, Clackmannanshire, and following the death of his mother was brought up in Edinburgh, Langholm, and Neilston and attended Barrhead High School. He attended the Royal Scottish Academy of Music and Drama in Glasgow.

== Career ==
=== Early work ===
Fisher worked with Scottish comedian Rikki Fulton on his hit sketch series Scotch and Wry (whose broadcast was mainly restricted to BBC One Scotland). Another Scottish comedian he worked with was Hector Nicol, in the BBC drama Just a Boys' Game (1979). Later, he appeared in Michael Radford's 1984 film Nineteen Eighty-Four as Winston Smith's neighbour Parsons. In 1988, he had a leading role in Silent Mouse, a dramatised television documentary telling the story of the creation of the Christmas carol Silent Night. In the same year he had a cameo (as a Victorian policeman) in the Michael Caine/Ben Kingsley vehicle, Without a Clue.

=== Prominence and Rab C. Nesbitt ===
Fisher is best known for his portrayal of the main character of the sitcom Rab C. Nesbitt, this itself was a spin-off from the BBC2 sketch comedy Naked Video, where the Nesbitt character originated, along with The Baldy Man who also obtained his own eponymous spin-off series, and is particularly associated with two Hamlet adverts involving photography, the first where he cannot get a satisfactory passport photo from a photobooth and lights up a cigar to calm himself down; the second where he cannot get a satisfactory family portrait and lights up a cigar to calm himself down. Johnny Depp based his Glaswegian accent for the role of Tarrant Hightopp, the Mad Hatter in the 2010 film Alice in Wonderland, on that used by Fisher’s Rab C. Nesbitt character.

In 1994–1995, he played the title role in the BBC series The Tales of Para Handy, in which he was reunited with Rikki Fulton. Fisher had also appeared in the 1999 sitcom Brotherly Love and in the 2002 sitcom Snoddy. He also appeared with Iain Glenn in the BBC Masterpiece theatre version of Kidnapped. On BBC2, on 23 December 2008, he reprised his role as Rab C Nesbitt in a Christmas special. Fisher's autobiography, The Boy from Nowhere, was published in 2015. To coincide with the publication, BBC One Scotland broadcast a documentary, In Search of Gregor Fisher, which followed Fisher and ghostwriter Melanie Reid during part of their research for the book.

Fisher appeared in the 2000 BBC adaptation of Gormenghast. Fisher starred as a main character D.S. Doug Duvall in the drama Missing, made by SMG Productions in 2006, the two-part thriller was not broadcast on STV until November 2008. In November 2006, he starred as Grandpa Potts in Chitty Chitty Bang Bang, in a three-month run of the show in Edinburgh. Most recently he has starred in the BBC's adaption of Oliver Twist, in the role of Mr Bumble.

In 2003, he appeared in the romantic comedy film Love Actually, where he played the role of the manager to fading music star, Billy Mack (Bill Nighy). In 2004, he played the role of Solanio in the Michael Radford film, The Merchant of Venice. In an interview in The Metro on 20 February 2008, he stated that he is no longer recognised as Rab C. Nesbitt, and rather is more likely to be stopped by fans for his recent role as Mr Bumble in Oliver Twist. Empty, a comedy series starring Fisher, began on BBC2 on 28 February 2008. In November 2024, Fisher appeared as Ken Pritchard, a lead character, in the BBC Scotland sitcom Only Child alongside Greg McHugh. It was announced in May 2025 that the series would be returning for a second season with Fisher reprising his role, with filming commencing in August 2025.

== Filmography ==
=== Film ===
Year	Title	Role	Notes
1980	The Anatomist by James Bridie	Landlord	
1983	Another Time, Another Place	Beel	
1984	Nineteen Eighty-Four	Parsons	Sometimes titled as 1984
1985	The Girl in the Picture	Bill	
1987	White Mischief	McPherson	
1988	To Kill a Priest	(unknown)	
1988	Without a Clue	Bobby at Warehouse	
2003	Love Actually	Joe	
2004	The Merchant of Venice	Solanio	
2005	Lassie	Mapes	
2010	Wild Target	Mike	
2016	Whisky Galore!	Joseph Macroon	

=== Television ===
Year	Title	Role	Notes
1977	Rob Roy	Dick	Episodes 1.1 & 1.2
1978	Play for Today	Georgie	Episode: "Donal and Sally"
1978	The Tomorrow People	Highlander	Episode 7.2: "The Fighting Spirit"; uncredited role
1978	ITV Playhouse	The Sargeant	Episode: "Hess"
1978, 1980, 1982	Scotch and Wry	Various roles	Episodes 1.1, 1.2, 1.3, 31 December 1980 & 31 December 1982
1979	Play for Today	Tanza	Episode: "Just a Boys' Game"
1980	Take the High Road	Ian Duff	Episodes 1.3 & 1.7
1980	Square Mile of Murder	Tom Connell	Episode: "The Human Crocodile"
1981	Strangers	Det. Insp. Forsyth	Episode: "Stand and Deliver"
1982	Kevin Turvey: The Man Behind the Green Door	Policeman	Television film; uncredited role
1982	Crown Court	Eric Mullins	Episodes: "Too Bad for Tobias: Parts 2 & 3"
1982–1984	Foxy Lady	Hector Ross	Series 1 & 2: 12 episodes; lead role
1984	End of the Line	Mike	Episodes: "The Silver Bullet" & "Blowout"
1986	Boon	Tom McGeary	Episode: "Fools Rush In"
1986	City Lights	Quincey Dickens	Episode: "Deep Freeze"
1986	Blood Red Roses	Alex McGuigan	3 episodes
1986	Scotch and Wry	Various roles	Video compilation
1986–1991	Naked Video	Various roles	Series 1–6; 30 episodes
1987	Dramarama	Albert Pickard	Episode: "Stan's First Night"
1987	Double Scotch and Wry	Various roles	Video compilation
1988–2011, 2014	Rab C. Nesbitt	Rab C. Nesbitt	Series 1–10 & 2014 New Year Special "Hoodie"; 67 episodes; lead role; 2012 - BAFTA Scotland award for best actor/actress, television
1990	Silent Mouse	Franz Gruber	Television film
1990	Chancer	Norman Attwood	Episodes: "Killing Floor" & "Hazard"
1990	Triple Scotch and Wry	Various roles	Video compilation
1994	Christmas Night with the Stars	Rab C. Nesbitt	Episode dated 27 December 1994
1994–1995	The Tales of Para Handy	Para Handy	Series 1 & 2; 9 episodes; lead role
1995	Saturday Disney	(unknown)	Episode dated 25 March 1995
1995	Kidnapped	Gahlsan	Television film
1995–1997	The Baldy Man	Baldy	Series 1 & 2; 13 episodes; lead role
1999–2000	Brotherly Love	Hector Robertson	7 episodes; lead role
2000	Gormenghast	The Fly	Mini-series; episode 3
2000	The Railway Children	Perks	Television film
2001	The Life and Adventures of Nicholas Nickleby	Mr Squeers	Television film
2002	Snoddy	Snoddy	4 episodes; lead role
2005	Kidnapped	James Stewart of the Glen	Television film
2006	Missing	DS Doug Duvall	2-part drama
2007	Oliver Twist	Mr. Bumble	Mini-series; 4 episodes
2008	Empty	Jacky Allen	6 episodes; lead role
2012	Love Life	Will	Episodes 1.1, 1.2 & 1.3
2014	Tommy Cooper: Not Like That, Like This	Miff Ferrie	Television film
2018	The ABC Murders	Dexter Dooley	Mini-series; episode 2
2020	There She Goes	Bill	Episode: "Speech and Language"
2021	The Cockfields	Ray	Series 2; 7 episodes
2024–2026	Only Child	Ken Pritchard	Series 1 & 2; 12 episodes

== Theatre ==
Year	Title	Role	Theatre Company	Director	Notes
1982	Ane Satyre of the Thrie Estaites	Falsehood	Scottish Theatre Company	Tom Fleming	play by Sir David Lyndsey, adapted by Robert Kemp
