= Greg McHugh =

Scottish actor (born 1980)

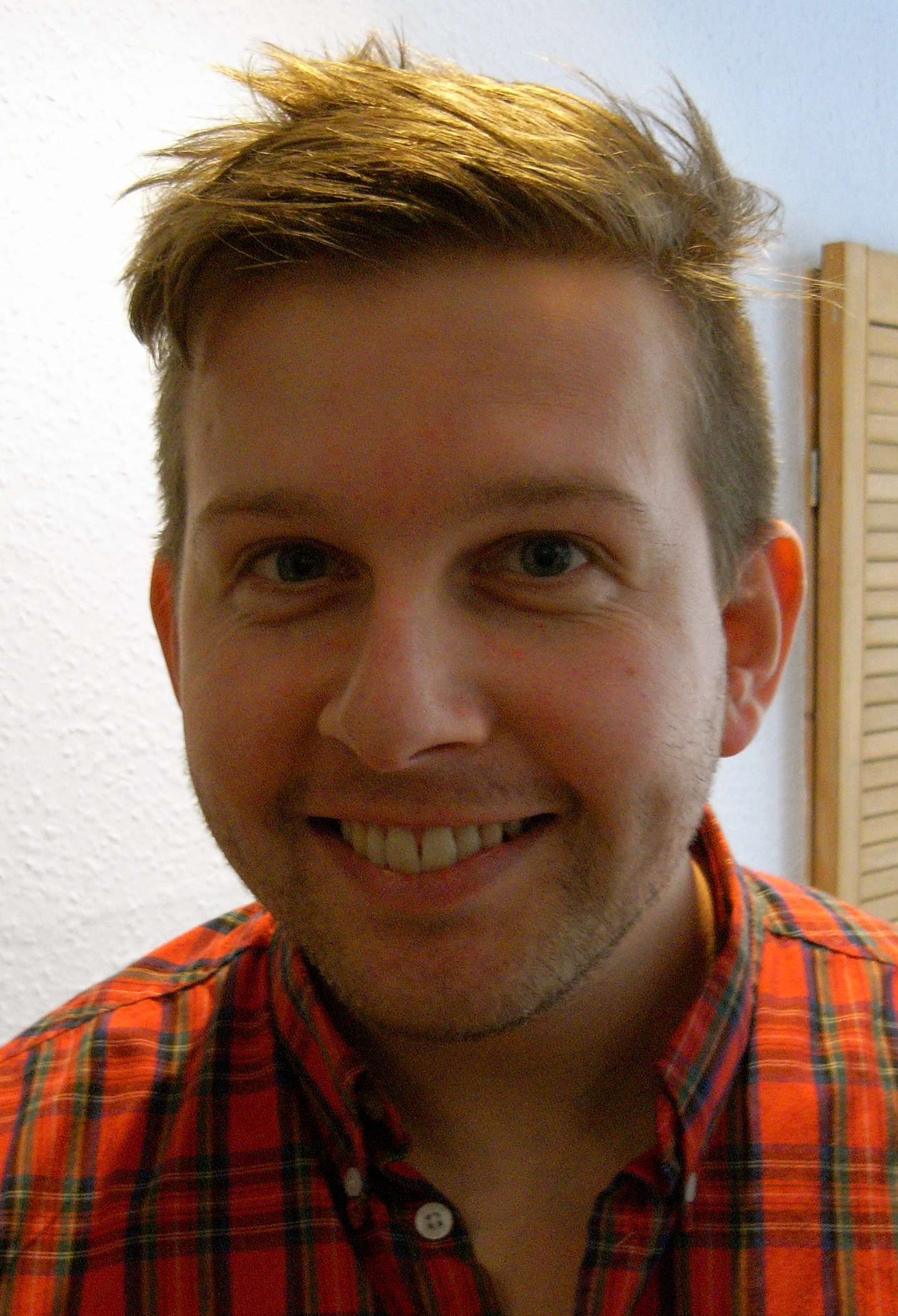
- McHugh in 2011
- Born: 5 January 1980 (age 46); Edinburgh, Scotland
- Education: Royal Conservatoire of Scotland
- Occupations: Actor, Professional Wrestling Historian
- Years active: 2002–present
- Spouse: Katie McHugh
- Children: 2

Greg McHugh (born 5 January 1980) is a Scottish actor and writer. He is the creator, writer and star of the BBC One Scotland comedy series Gary: Tank Commander (2009–2012). He also played Howard in the Channel 4 comedy Fresh Meat. Since 2024, he has played the role of Richard Pritchard in the sitcom Only Child.

He has been described as being associated with "wit, originality, and depth in the world of British television". He was nominated for a BAFTA Scotland award for his work on Gary: Tank Commander.

== Early life and education ==
Greg McHugh was born in Morningside, Edinburgh, on 5 January 1980. His father was a civil servant, and his mother a teacher. McHugh has two older brothers.

McHugh attended St Peter's RC primary school and then St Thomas of Aquin's High School. He studied business at the University of Stirling and trained at the Royal Scottish Academy of Music and Drama in Glasgow. Initially, McHugh had intended to study sports science but found it too difficult.

McHugh's native accent is a softer variation of the Edinburgh accent.

== Career ==
McHugh can be seen briefly on screen in the Still Game episode "Faimly" as a friend or relative visiting the patient in the bed beside Winston Ingram. McHugh played Josh Elvey in the TV movie Not Safe for Work. In 2010, McHugh appeared in the episode "Don the Musical" of the English sitcom How Not to Live Your Life. He played Randy, a local actor of amateur dramatics who played the Tom Cruise character, Charlie Babbitt, in a musical version of Rain Man. He was in two 2010 episodes of Rab C. Nesbitt as Liam O'Hagan. The episodes were "Muse" and "Candy." He appeared on Red Nose Day 2011 reporting the fund-raising going on throughout Scotland for Comic Relief.

McHugh was nominated for a Scottish BAFTA as writer of Gary: Tank Commander. Between 2011 & 2016, McHugh starred as Howard in the Channel 4 comedy Fresh Meat. In 2013, McHugh appeared in the Channel 4 serial Dates, and the Bad Education Christmas special as Bonehead, a homeless man. In 2014, McHugh appeared in the BBC film Marvellous playing the part of Malcolm, the long-time friend of Neil Baldwin.

From 6 December 2014 to 11 January 2015, McHugh starred as the character of Smee in the pantomime production of Peter Pan at the King's Theatre, Glasgow. In 2016, 2017 & 2020, he appeared as Eddie Scott in the Cumbria-based BBC1 drama The A Word. On 21 September 2016, McHugh made a secret guest appearance at the first "Andy Murray Live" event, a charity tennis exhibition event raising funds for UNICEF and the Glasgow-based charity, Young People's Futures. From 20 to 22 October 2016, he reprised his role as Gary: Tank Commander in a stage version of the sitcom at The Hydro in Glasgow.

== Personal life ==
McHugh lives in Hove, East Sussex, with his wife Katie. The couple have two children. The couple chose a Humanist Society Scotland wedding because humanism reflected their values, saying "neither [of us] are religious" and they wanted a wedding that "celebrat[ed] the people involved rather than a day dominated by a lot of 'higher power' chat."

== Filmography ==
=== Film ===
Year	Title	Role	Notes
2012	Phone Home	Astronaut	Short film
2015	Kicking Off	Cliff	
TBA	Faithful	Michael	Short film (post-production)

=== Television ===
Year	Title	Role	Notes
2002	Still Game	Hospital Visitor	Series 1; Episode 2: "Faimly" (uncredited role)
2007	Comedy Lab	Various characters	Series 9; Episode 6: "Blowout" (also writer)
2008	Gary's War	Gary McLintoch	Television film (pilot for series Gary: Tank Commander)
2008	Delta Forever	Guantanamo Ray	Pilot episode (also writer)
2008	The Incredible Will and Greg	Many	Television films
2009	Not Safe for Work	Josh Elvey	Television films
2009	1 Star	Gray (voice)	Television films
2009	Eadar-Chluich		Episode 7: "Bàs an Eich (Death of the Horse)"
2009–2012	Gary: Tank Commander	Gary McLintoch	Main role; Series 1–3; 18 episodes (also writer)
2010	Rab C. Nesbitt	Liam O'Hagan	Series 9; Episodes 3 & 5: "Candy" and "Muse"
2010	How Not to Live Your Life	Randy	Series 3; Episode 7: "Don the Musical"
2011–2016	Fresh Meat	Howard McGregor	Series 1–4; 30 episodes
2012	The Approximate History of Maths	Alan / Various (voice)	Television film
2013	Bob Servant Independent	Anders	Mini-series; Episodes 1 & 5: "Launch Day" and "The Debate"
2013	Dates	Callum	Episode 6: "Erica & Callum"
2013	Bad Education	Bonehead	Series 2; Episode 7: "Christmas"
2013	Two Doors Down	Tony	Television film (pilot for series)
2014	Marvellous	Malcolm	Television film
2014	The Feeling Nuts Comedy Night	Howard	Television Special
2016	Gary: Tank Commander's Election Special	Gary McLintoch	Television film (also writer)
2016–2020	The A Word	Eddie Scott	Series 1–3; 16 episodes
2018	Gary Goes to Hollywood	Gary McLintock	Television film (also writer)
2018–2022	A Discovery of Witches	Hamish Osborne	Series 1 & 3; 8 episodes
2019	Traitors	David Hennessey	Mini-series; Episodes 1–3: "Feef", "Hugh" and "Priscilla"
2021	The Cockfields	Tony	Series 2; 4 episodes
2021–2023	Guilt	Teddy McLean	Series 2 & 3; 8 episodes
2022	Man vs. Bee	Coleman	Episodes 1 & 3: "Chapter 1" and "Chapter 3"
2023	Dog Squad	Dan (voice)	Series 2; Episode 2: "Mission: Windy Day"
2024	Super Happy Magic Forest	Herbert (voice)	(unknown episodes)
2024–2026	Only Child	Richard Pritchard	12 episodes
2025	Shetland	Colin Waite	6 episodes

== Theatre ==
Year	Production	Role	Venue	Notes
2014/15	Peter Pan	Smee	King's Theatre, Glasgow	
2016/17	Gary: Tank Commander	Gary McLintoch	SSE Hydro, Glasgow	
2017/18	Jack and the Beanstalk	Gary Trot	SSE Hydro, Glasgow	
2019/20	Snow White and the Seven Dwarfs	Gary Muddles	SSE Hydro, Glasgow	
2023/24	Sleeping Beauty	Gary McLintoch	His Majesty's Theatre, Aberdeen	
