= Pavilion Theatre, Glasgow =

Theatre in Glasgow, Scotland

Coordinates: 55.8651°N 4.2557°W

Pavilion Theatre
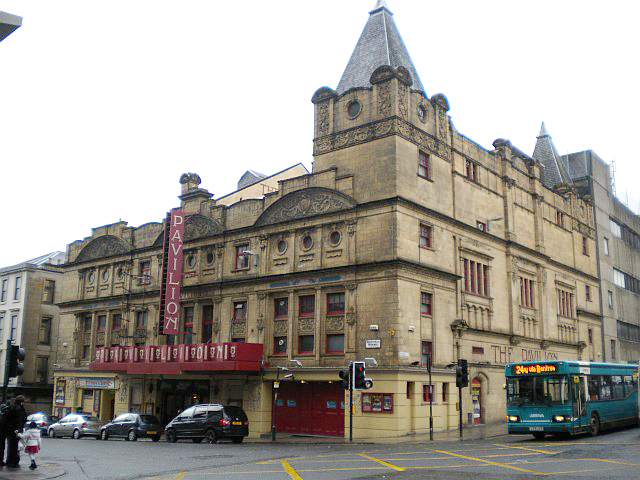
- Interactive map of Pavilion Theatre
- Address: 125 Renfield Street; Glasgow; Scotland
- Owner: The Glasgow Pavilion Ltd.
- Capacity: 1,449
- Type: Proscenium

Construction
- Opened: 1904
- Architect: Bertie Crewe

The Pavilion Theatre is a theatre in Glasgow located on Renfield Street.

== History ==
One of Glasgow's oldest theatres, the Pavilion Theatre of Varieties opened on 29 February 1904 as a Music hall. In conjunction with Walter de Frece, its initiator was Benjamin Simons whose father Bailie Michael Simons (chairman of theatre owners Howard & Wyndham guaranteed the funding required. The building has remained relatively unchanged in layout, although the sound and lighting systems have been updated over the years. It is now protected as a category A listed building.

The theatre was designed by Bertie Crewe as one of the three Glasgow venues operating as part of Thomas Barrasford's growing chain of British Music Halls, and was regarded as luxurious for its time. (The other two were Glasgow Hippodrome in New City Road and the Palace in Main Street, Gorbals.) The owners, Glasgow Pavilion Ltd, described its decor as "pure Louis XV", featuring Rococo plasterwork across the proscenium arch and boxes, terrazzo flooring, leadlight glazing and rich mahogany wood finishing. Ventilation was ensured by an electrically operated sliding roof panel above the auditorium. The facade was designed in the French Renaissance style and finished using glazed buff coloured terracotta. The auditorium's capacity of 1449 is made up of 677 stalls, 341 circle, 413 balcony and 18 box seats. A founding director, and soon managing director was Rich Waldon of the city's Royal Princess's Theatre.

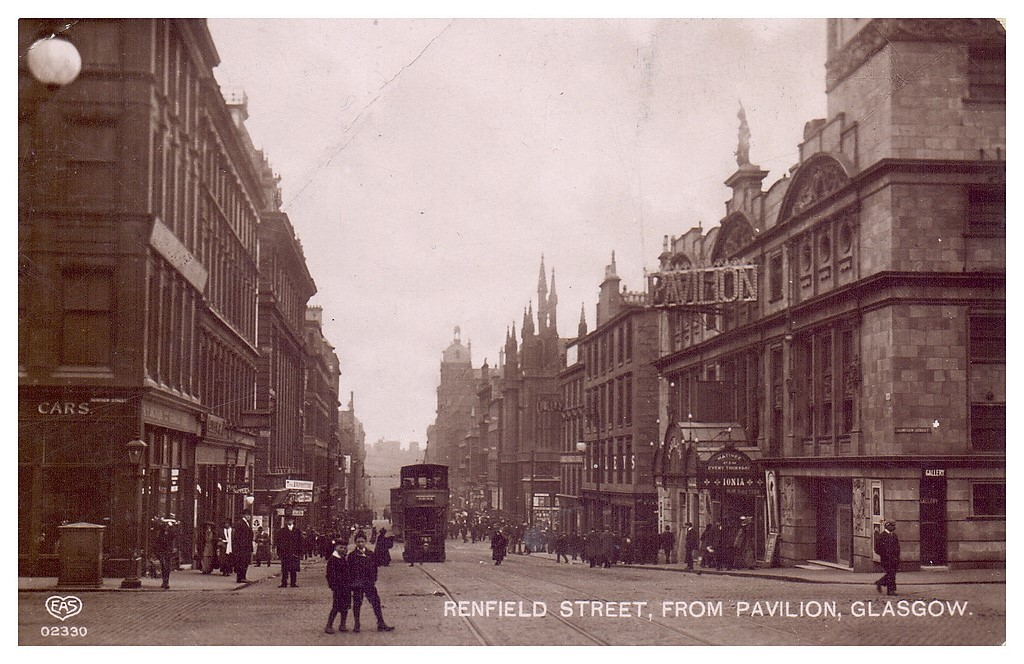
Pavilion Theatre shown in a postcard of around 1912 of Renfield Street, Glasgow, at the corner of Renfrew Street

Many of the leading music hall artistes of the early 20th century appeared at the Pavilion, including Marie Lloyd, Little Tich, Harry Lauder, Sarah Bernhardt and a then unknown Charlie Chaplin.

In 1920 the Pavilion started producing pantomimes. From 1919 to 1957 the theatre and its productions and management were led by Fred Collins and his son Horace Collins and family. Star performers included Dave Willis, Jack Anthony and GH Elliot. Of their many shows, revues and pantomimes some pantomimes have been recorded on film for posterity. Glasgow University and the Orchestra of Scottish Opera have assisted the restoration and remastering of these. The Fred Collins Variety Agency was next door to the theatre in Renfield Street. During World War II Horace Collins was appointed ENSA director for Scotland. The Collins family leased and owned other theatres including Aberdeen's Tivoli Theatre, Dundee's Palace Theatre and Edinburgh's Theatre Royal, and Liverpool's Shakespeare Theatre. The last two being leased from Howard & Wyndham Ltd.

The theatre continues to produce pantomime and also functions as a receiving house for plays and alternative comedians. The Pavilion Theatre is now the only privately run theatre in Scotland and one of a few unsubsidised independent theatres left in Britain outside London. The theatre mainly runs populist productions and pantomimes, as well as comedians and touring bands on the 'nostalgia' circuit.

In 2004 Janette Krankie was seriously injured during a performance of Jack and the Beanstalk at the theatre, but made a full recovery.

In 2007, the Pavilion Theatre reinvented itself as the Scottish National Theatre of Variety, with a launch including numerous stars of the stage and the announcement was made by Iain Gordon the General Manager.

The Mighty Boosh have performed several times at the venue, including with early shows Arctic Boosh and Autoboosh in a five night stint in 2000, as well as their 2006 stage show. An episode of their radio series was also recorded at the venue. The act performed at the Pavilion once again on 13 and 14 September 2008 with Boosh Live. These dates set a record for the fastest selling act ever at the Pavilion, with tickets selling out in 3 hours for both nights.

In 2023 the theatre was bought by the Trafalgar Entertainment Group.

== Location ==
The theatre located in the north of Glasgow city centre, at the top of Renfield Street at the corner of Renfrew Street (opposite the Cineworld Glasgow and a block away from the Royal Conservatoire of Scotland). It is a short walk from Cowcaddens and Buchanan Street Subway stations, and Buchanan bus station.

== Pantomimes ==
The Pavilion has been the home of Glasgow Pantomimes for years. The most notable of recent performers include The Krankies, Jim Davidson, Michelle McManus and Natalie J Robb

Year	Title	Main Cast
2001	Aladdin	The Krankies; Gary Hollywood; Derek Lord; Christian
2002	Cinderella	The Krankies; Gary Hollywood; Christian; Lesley Fitz-Simons
2003	Pinocchio & his Magical Adventures	The Krankies; Mary Riggans; Natalie J Robb
2004	Jack & The Beanstalk	The Krankies; Gary Hollywood; Natalie J Robb
2005	Aladdin	Tony Roper; Nicola Park; Ryan Fletcher
2006	Peter Pan	Dean Park; Cat Harvey; Stephen Purdon
2007	Cinderella	Dean Park; Derek Lord; Joyce Falconer; Cat Harvey
2008	The Wizard of Never Woz	Dean Park; Des McLean; Derek Lord; Stephen Purdon
2009	The Magical Adventures of Pinocchio	Stephen Purdon; Dean Park; Des McLean; Joyce Falconer; Derek Lord
2010	Robin Hood	Jim Davidson; Dean Park; Stephen Purdon; Cat Harvey; Colin McAllister and Justin Ryan
2011	Peter Pan	Jim Davidson; Johnny Mac; Dean Park
2012	The Wizard of Never Woz	Michelle McManus; Johnny Mac; Stephen Purdon; Jimmy Chisholm; Joyce Falconer; Dean Park
2013	The NEW Magical Adventures of Pinocchio	Dean Park; Johnny Mac; Michelle McManus; Stephen Purdon
2014	Treasure Island	Michelle McManus; Gary Lamont; Holly Jack; Stephen Purdon; Johnny Mac; Cat Harvey
2015	Santa Claus is Coming to Town	Stephen Purdon; Dean Park; Gary Lamont; Nicola Park; Tyler Collins; Leah MacRae
2016	Elfie's Magical Adventure	Grado; Stephen Purdon; Liam Dolan; Cat Harvey; Ewen Cameron; Nicola Park
2017	The Wizard of Never Woz	Dean Park; Liam Dolan; Christian; Stephen Purdon; Grado; Holly Jack; Joyce Falconer; Nicola Park
2022	Aladdin	Nicola Park; Grado; Liam Dolan; Stephen Purdon
2023	Treasure Island	Cast to be announced

== See also ==
- Culture in Glasgow
- List of Category A listed buildings in Glasgow
- List of theatres in Scotland
