= Ilona Massey =

Hungarian film, stage and radio performer

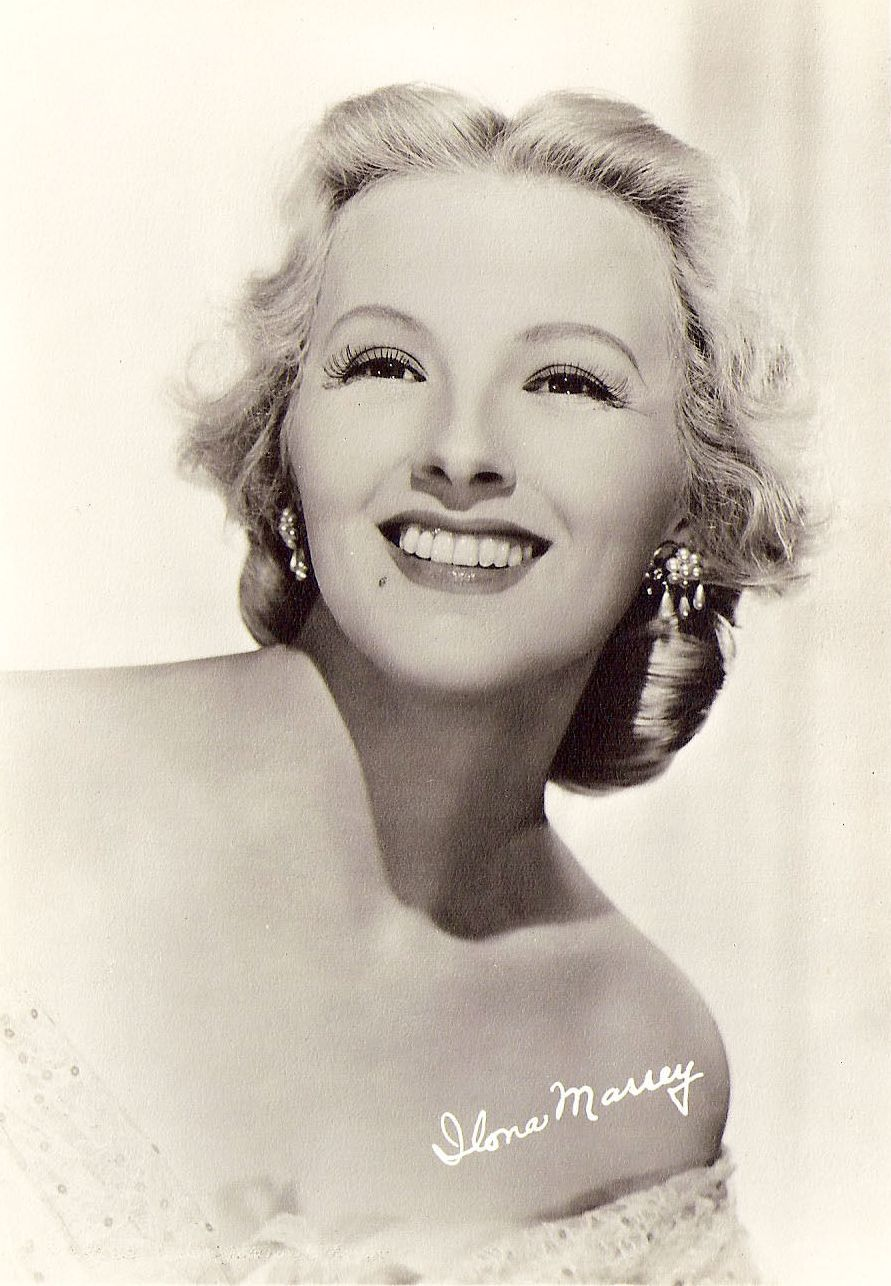
- Massey in 1941
- Born: Ilona Hagymási; June 16, 1910; Budapest, Kingdom of Hungary (now in Hungary)
- Died: August 20, 1974 (aged 64); Bethesda, Maryland, U.S.
- Resting place: Arlington National Cemetery
- Occupation: Actress
- Years active: 1935–1959
- Spouses: Nick Szavazd (m. 1935; div. 1936) Alan Curtis (m. 1941; div. 1942) Charles Walker (m. 1952; div. 1954) Donald Dawson (m. 1955)

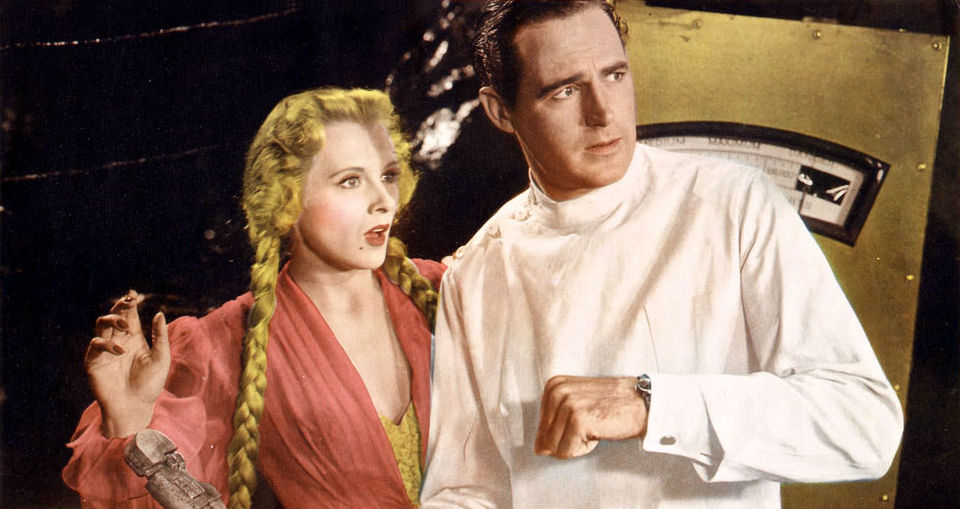
Massey and Patric Knowles in Frankenstein Meets the Wolf Man (1943)

Ilona Hajmássy, known outside of Hungary as Ilona Massey (June 16, 1910 – August 20, 1974), was a Hungarian-American film, stage, and radio performer.

== Early life and career ==
She was born in Budapest, Hungary. Billed as "the new Dietrich", she acted in three films with Nelson Eddy, including Rosalie (1937), and with Lon Chaney Jr. in Frankenstein Meets the Wolf Man (1943) as Baroness Frankenstein. In 1943, she appeared in the Ziegfeld Follies.

In 1947, she starred with Eddy in Northwest Outpost, a musical film composed by Rudolf Friml. In 1949, she starred in Love Happy with the Marx Brothers. She played Madame Egelichi, a femme fatale spy, and her performance inspired Milton Caniff in the creation of his femme fatale spy, Madame Lynx, in the comic strip "Steve Canyon". Caniff hired Massey to pose for him.

In 1950, Massey was one of the stars of the NBC spy show Top Secret on radio. In 1952, she began starring in Rendezvous on ABC television. The program was described in a magazine article as "a mystery-drama with plenty of glamour thrown in."

Beginning on November 1, 1954, she hosted DuMont's The Ilona Massey Show, a weekly musical variety show in which she sang songs with guests in a nightclub set, with music provided by the Irving Fields Trio. The series ended January 3, 1955, after 10 episodes.

== Recognition ==
Massey has a star at 1623 Vine Street on the Hollywood Walk of Fame. It was dedicated February 8, 1960.

== Politics ==
Massey became an American citizen in 1946. She remained strongly anticommunist for what she saw as the destruction of her native country, at one point picketing the United Nations during the 1959 visit of Soviet Premier Nikita Khrushchev.

== Death ==
Massey died of cancer in Bethesda, Maryland, and is buried in Virginia's Arlington National Cemetery near her last husband, Donald Dawson, who had served in the United States Air Force Reserve as a major general.

== Filmography ==
Year	Title	Role	Notes
1935	Heaven on Earth	Operettendiva Fioritta	
1935	Circus Saran	Eine Sängerin	
1937	Rosalie	Brenda	
1939	Balalaika	Lydia Pavlovna Marakova	
1941	The Great Awakening	Anna	
1941	International Lady	Carla Nillson	
1942	Invisible Agent	Maria Sorenson	
1943	Frankenstein Meets the Wolf Man	Baroness Elsa Frankenstein	
1946	Holiday in Mexico	Countess Toni Karpathy	
1947	Northwest Outpost	Natalia Alanova	
1948	The Plunderers	Lin Connor	
1949	Love Happy	Madame Egelichi	
1959	Jet Over the Atlantic	Mme. Galli-Cazetti	
1967	The Cool Ones	Toni Karpathy	Uncredited, (final film role)
