= The Plunderers (1948 film) =

1948 film by Joseph Kane

- Theatrical release poster
- Directed by: Joseph Kane
- Screenplay by: Gerald Geraghty; Gerald Drayson Adams
- Story by: James Edward Grant
- Produced by: Joseph Kane
- Starring: Rod Cameron; Ilona Massey; Lorna Gray; Forrest Tucker; George Cleveland; Grant Withers
- Cinematography: Jack A. Marta
- Edited by: Arthur Roberts
- Music by: R. Dale Butts
- Production company: Republic Pictures
- Distributed by: Republic Pictures
- Release date: October 31, 1948
- Running time: 87 minutes
- Country: United States
- Language: English

The Plunderers is a 1948 American Western film directed by Joseph Kane and written by Gerald Geraghty and Gerald Drayson Adams. The film stars Rod Cameron, Ilona Massey, Lorna Gray, Forrest Tucker, George Cleveland and Grant Withers. The film was released on October 31, 1948, by Republic Pictures.

== Plot ==
Whit Lacey and his gang chase a wagon of ore from Eben Martin's mine. When Martin tells elderly local sheriff Sam Borden he says he has more to worry about. Soon after Borden discovers John Drum in a general store and tries to arrest him. Drum shoots the sheriff in front of the store owner and saloon dancers Lin Conner and Julie Ann McCabe, and then escapes on a horse from the stables which turns out to be McCabe's. He is chased by a posse but escapes in the hills. When he is attacked by a Sioux war party he drives them off with help from Lacey and his companion Indian Eddie. Drum and Lacey introduce each other, Drum saying he knows Lacey is a wanted man and Lacey saying he heard Drum shot the sheriff.

Lacey says they should work together and he has a plan in mind. Drum is to pretend to marry McCabe so that she can get out of town without being followed as the authorities think that she is Lacey's girlfriend. Drum tells McCabe who agrees, hoping that then she and Lacey can go to California. Conner is upset that her friend is going away with a criminal.

After the wedding, Borden's funeral takes place, with Borden and the new sheriff, Tap Lawrence, his former deputy, watching from an upstairs window. Drum joins them and it is revealed the shooting was staged so that Drum could trick Lacey.

Drum, McCabe and Lacey leave town after staging a conversation with Lawrence who states he has no interest in McCabe now that she is no longer Lacey's girlfriend. After the trio meet up with Lacey and his gang, Lacey announces that they are going to steal some horses and the profits will enable him to go to California with McCabe. The gang's second-in-charge, Calico, would rather steal some rifles he knows about which will be worth twice as much money as the horses. Lacey disagrees, saying he knows the guns will get sold to the Apache and he does not want that. They take the horses to the local fort but just as the colonel agrees to buy them, the wounded man arrives having been found by a patrol. He recognises the horses and the gang is forced to leave without their money. They are pursued by a patrol and eventually only Lacey and Drum escape.

Drum and Lacey meet up with McCabe and Conner at the gang's hideout. Lacey sends the other three back into town for a few days. Drum visits Borden and shows him the sketches he has made of the McCabe. Conner and Lacey which look like portraits but in fact show the terrain around the hideout, which has a hard-to-find narrow gully at its entrance.

Martin proposes to Conner but she rejects him. Drum suggest Conner join him on his ranch, implying they could marry, be she rejects him also. Martin complains to Lawrence about nothing being done to capture Lacey. Lawrence says something is but it is a secret and Marin offers to buy him a drink. Shortly after Lawrence gives Indian Eddie a note. Eddie gives the note to Lacey and it reveals Drum is an army officer and Borden's shooting was faked. Lacey says he'll give Drum a chance to ride out but that they will shoot at him after he leaves. Drum gives Lacey a note. When Drum rides away Calico tries to shoot him but the rifle which Lacey gives him misfires. When Lacey takes the rifle off him he misses Drum who gets away. Lacey reads the note to Conner which makes Drum the heir to Drum's ranch. Calico says Lacey deliberately loaded the rifle incorrectly so Drum could get away. Lacey says he liked Drum. Calico says he's going leave and he hopes they catch Lacey.

As Drum leaves the gully from the hideout he is stopped by Martin and the posse, who have followed Indian Eddie. Drum tells Martin that Lacey knows the truth. Shortly after the posse captures Lacey, McCabe, Conner and Calico. Martin offers Lacey and Calico $200 to reveal who wrote the note given to Indian Eddie, but they both refuse. Conner says Drum should let Lacey free to return the favour

At the nearby outpost word has reached them that Red Cloud and his Sioux warriors are on the warpath. When the posse arrives on their way to Fort Jefferson, the outpost is filling up with the local residents while a patrol has passed through on their way to go after Red Cloud. Conner again asks Drum to let Lacey go, but he again refuses. Martin is also in the fort and he riles the locals up to lynch Lacey to stop him implicating Martin. Drum stops the lynching. Later the mob disarms Drum and Martin, breaks into the jail and attempts to lynch Lacey and Calico. Just as they are about to be lynched the Sioux fire a flame arrow into outpost. Drum takes charge and tells everyone to relax as the Sioux won't attack until dawn. They do however start firing flame arrows from the outbuildings. Drum, Lacey and Clico volunteer to go out and stop them. Calico forces Martin to join them. McCabe also joins them in one of the outbuildings.

Lacey asks Drum to take McCabe back inside the outpost but he says Martin can go. Lacey doesn't trust Martin and when Drum insists Lacey shoots Martin. Drum then agrees, and takes McCabe but she gets hit by an arrow. They make it inside, but McCabe dies. Then the Sioux blow a hole in the fort and set fire to the outbuilding. Lacey and Calico jump out of the building and are attacked. Just as they are overwhelmed the cavalry patrol arrives and the Sioux retreat. Drum finds Lacey just before he dies. Calico is also dead.

Drum resigns his commission and heads back to his ranch. Conner goes with him.

== Cast ==
- Rod Cameron as John Drum
- Ilona Massey as Lin Connor
- Lorna Gray as Julie Ann McCabe
- Forrest Tucker as Whit Lacey
- George Cleveland as Sheriff Sam Borden
- Grant Withers as Deputy Tap Lawrence
- Taylor Holmes as Eben Martin
- Paul Fix as Calico
- Francis Ford as Barnaby
- James Flavin as Sergeant Major
- Hank Bell as Stagecoach Driver
- Russell Hicks as Cavalry Colonel
- Maude Eburne as Old Dame at Wedding
- Mary Ruth Wade as Pioneer Girl
- Louis Faust as Fort Sentry
