= Rendezvous (1952 TV series) =

American television program

Rendezvous is an American television program that was the first to have a female spy as its lead character.

Rendezvous debuted on ABC on February 13, 1952, at 9:30 p.m. (Eastern Time) and ended on March 5, 1952. Set in Paris, the 30-minute program starred Ilona Massey as Nikki Angell, who owned and sang at the Chez Nikki nightclub.

Angell had been an agent in the French resistance during World War II, and her involvement with the nightclub enabled her to continue her espionage, now focused on defeating the efforts of Communist agents. Additional intrigue came from drug smugglers, thieves, and traitors who showed up at the club. Angell's personal life included a romantic relationship with a newspaper reporter (played by David McKay). Each episode included one or two songs sung by Massey in her role as Angell.

A review in the trade publication Billboard described the initial episode as "a polished reworking of a formula current on video", but it described the story as "wafer thin". After several episodes had been broadcast, media critic John Crosby wrote, "The plots are remarkably ordinary; the general level of production is low and the direction is rudimentary."

Seymour Robbie directed Rendezvous, which was produced by Jerry Layton Associates.
