= Northwest Outpost =

1947 film by Allan Dwan

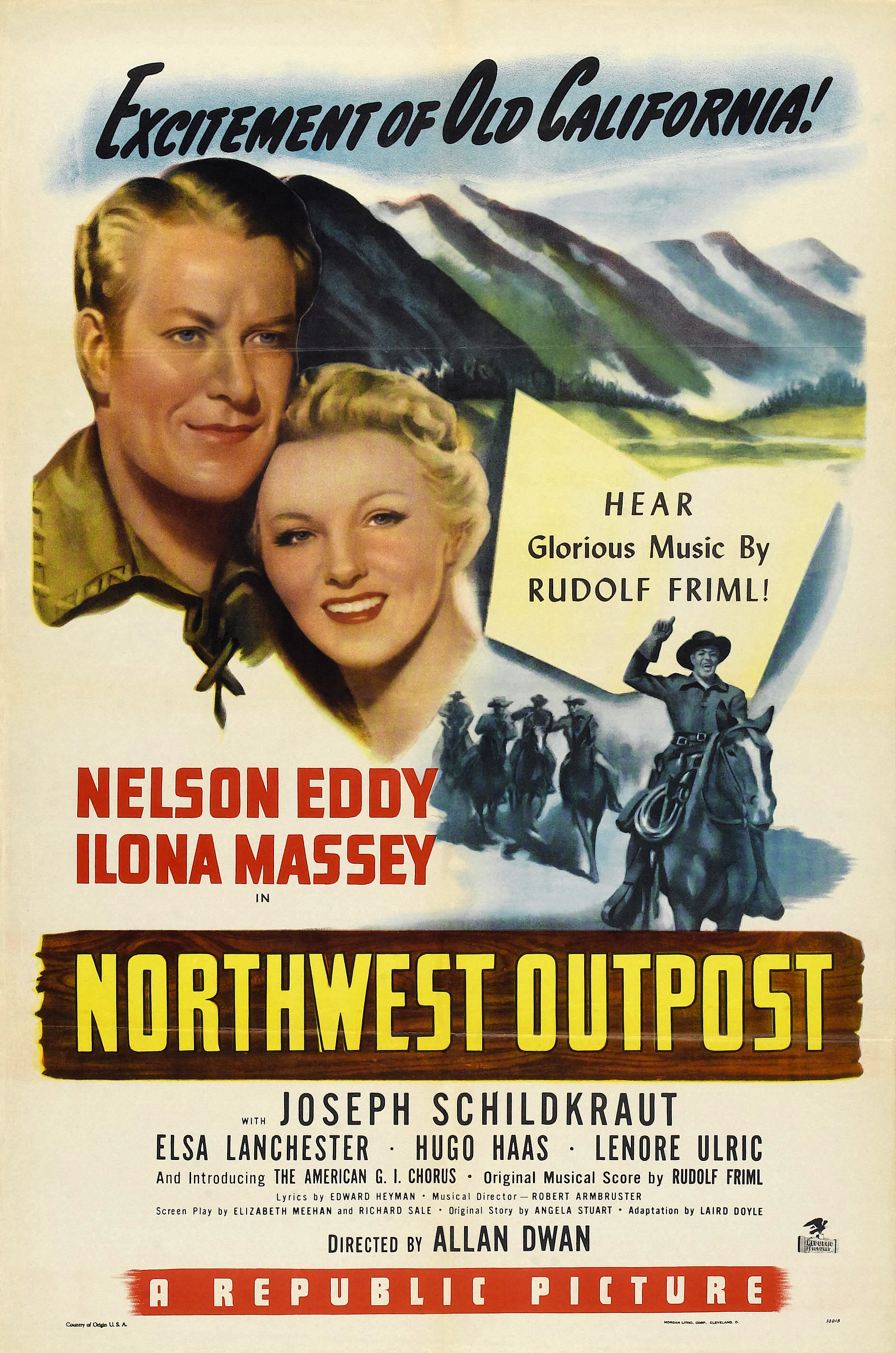
- Theatrical poster
- Directed by: Allan Dwan
- Written by: Laird Doyle (adaptation)
- Screenplay by: Elizabeth Meehan; Richard Sale
- Story by: Angela Stuart (original story)
- Produced by: Allan Dwan
- Starring: Nelson Eddy; Ilona Massey
- Cinematography: Reggie Lanning
- Edited by: Harry Keller
- Music by: Rudolf Friml
- Color process: Black and white
- Production company: Republic Pictures
- Distributed by: Republic Pictures
- Release date: June 25, 1947
- Running time: 91 minutes
- Country: United States
- Language: English
- Budget: $1,224,258

Northwest Outpost (also known as End of the Rainbow) is a 1947 American Musical Western film directed by Allan Dwan and starring Nelson Eddy and Ilona Massey. The film was Eddy's last, and is an operetta film like his previous starring roles. He was persuaded to make it by Republic Pictures because Rudolf Friml was writing the score. It was well received by critics and had a strong box office performance.

== Plot ==
The film is set at the Russian imperial post at Fort Ross in California in the early Nineteenth Century. A visiting American army officer becomes romantically involved with an aristocratic woman whose criminal husband is being held as a prisoner at the Fort.

== Cast ==
- Nelson Eddy as Captain Jim Laurence
- Ilona Massey as Natalia Alanova
- Joseph Schildkraut as Count Igor Savin
- Elsa Lanchester as Princess 'Tanya' Tatiana
- Hugo Haas as Prince Nickolai Balinin
- Lenore Ulric as Baroness Kruposny
- Peter Whitney as Volkoff Overseer
- Tamara Shayne as Olga Natalia's Maid
- Ernő Verebes as Kyril Balinin's Aide
- George Sorel as Baron Kruposny
- Rick Vallin as Dovkin
- The American G.I. Chorus as Prisoners

== See also ==
- List of American films of 1947
