= Holiday in Mexico =

1946 film by George Sidney

- Directed by: George Sidney
- Screenplay by: Isobel Lennart
- Story by: William Kozlenko
- Produced by: Joe Pasternak
- Starring: Walter Pidgeon; José Iturbi; Roddy McDowall; Jane Powell; Ilona Massey; Xavier Cugat
- Cinematography: Harry Stradling Sr.
- Edited by: Adrienne Fazan
- Music by: Calvin Jackson; George Stoll
- Production companies: Metro-Goldwyn-Mayer (MGM); MGM Cartoon Studio (animated sequences)
- Distributed by: Loew's Inc.
- Release date: August 15, 1946
- Running time: 128 minutes
- Country: United States
- Language: English
- Budget: $2,345,000
- Box office: $5,723,000

Holiday in Mexico is a 1946 America Technicolor musical comedy film directed by George Sidney and starring Walter Pidgeon, Jane Powell, and Ilona Massey. It was produced by Metro-Goldwyn-Mayer and marked Powell's first film for the Hollywood studio who had placed her under contract.

== Plot ==
The film starts with a brief cartoon of telephone wires from Washington, DC trying to call Mexico. Jeffrey Evans (Walter Pidgeon), an American ambassador to Mexico, is the sole parent to his teenage daughter, Christine (Jane Powell). She finds fulfillment in managing her father's life and spending time with him. Her father forces her to attend a party where her childhood friend, Stanley Owen (Roddy McDowall), who has just turned sixteen, awaits her. In revenge she gives Stanley one of her father's expensive, brand-new tobacco pipes. Stanley, thinking that this gift was meant to show that he is finally a man, asks Christine to be "his girl", but she insists that she is too busy for that. Yvette Baranga (Helene Stanley), the daughter of the French ambassador, begs Christine if she can attend Jeffrey Evans' upcoming party. Christine agrees, unaware that Yvette has a crush on her father. When they return home, Christine asks her father to permit her to arrange the party, to which he agrees. The next day, Stanley comes to drive her to her errands. Christine apologizes for being rude to Stanley, and says he doesn't have to drive her, but he takes her to speak with Toni Karpathy (Ilona Massey), who agrees to sing at the party. Unbeknownst to Christine, Toni was once a love interest of her father.

She then goes to meet with the piano virtuoso (Jose Iturbi). He is impressed by her skills of putting his crazy household back into place and comments that her father is lucky to have her, but he is blown away when he hears her sing and asks her to perform in his concert. She declines because she and her father will be leaving to visit her grandmother. The party is a success, however Christine misses half of it because she forgot to get herself ready. Her spirits are lifted when Jose arrives and not only performs, but gives her an expensive corsage. Stanley becomes jealous and argues with Christine.

Through the week, Jeffrey Evans spends more time with Toni. Christine, not knowing what her father is up to, calls Stanley. She has him help sneak her into the evening club to spy on her father. They successfully get past the guards, but Stanley makes a fool of himself by tripping into customers. When Christine sees her father in the club with Toni, she sadly leaves. At home she complains that no one needs her anymore. Stanley says that he needs her, but Christine puts him down saying he has his mother to take care of him. She then remembers what Jose told her and begins to dream of marrying him, though he is decades older than she is. Stanley leaves furious. Later, her father tells her that he won't go to visit Christine's grandmother. Christine also decides to stay so that she can perform in Jose's concert.

Stanley visits Jeffrey and tells him that she is in love with Jose, but her father assures him that it is nothing to be worried about. However, he reconsiders when he sees one of her drawings of Jose. Yvette drops by and Jeffery, thinking she was visiting Christine, asks her if it is possible for a young woman like herself to be interested in an older man. Yvette, believing that he is referring to her, says yes and happily leaves.

Jeffrey goes to see Jose and finds that he is not romantically interested in Christine. The Evans visit Jose and he introduces Christine to his grandchildren. Christine, shocked, returns home and tearfully goes to her room to pack for her grandmother's. Jeffrey tries to follow however he is stopped by the French ambassador, who tries to make arrangements for Yvette to marry Jeffrey. Realizing this situation would take forever resolving, he says he cannot marry Yvette because her dowry is too low. Jeffrey then goes to speak with his daughter and tells her that running away from her problems will not solve them. She stays and performs in the concert while her father, Toni, and Stanley proudly watch her.

== Cast ==
- Walter Pidgeon as Jeffrey Evans
- Jane Powell as Christine Evans
- José Iturbi as himself
- Roddy McDowall as Stanley Owen
- Ilona Massey as Countess Toni Karpathy
- Xavier Cugat as himself
- Hugo Haas as Angus, Evans' butler
- Helene Stanley as Yvette Baranga
- Mikhail Rasumny as Baranga
- William "Bill" Phillips as Sam, Evans' chauffeur
- Amparo Iturbi as herself
- Tonia Hero as Mouse (Iturbi Grandchild)
- Teresa Hero as Mouse (Iturbi Grandchild)

== Soundtrack ==
- I Think of You
  - Music based on Piano Concerto No.2 by Sergei Rachmaninoff
  - Music Adaptation and Lyrics by Jack Elliott & Don Marcotte
- Someone to Love
  - Music by Paul Abraham
  - Lyrics by Ralph Freed
- These Patient Years
  - Music by Sammy Fain
  - Lyrics by Ralph Freed
- Holiday in Mexico
  - Music by Sammy Fain
  - Lyrics by Ralph Freed
- You, So It's You
  - Music by Nacio Herb Brown
  - Lyrics by Earl K. Brent
- And Dreams Remain
  - Music by Raoul Soler
  - Lyrics by Ralph Freed
- Walter Winchell Rhumba
  - Music by Noro Morales
- Yo Te Amo Much - And That's That
  - Written by Sam H. Stept, Ervin Drake, Xavier Cugat & Noro Morales
- Piano Concerto No. 2 in C Minor
  - Music by Sergei Rachmaninoff
- Polonaise in A Flat, Opus 53
  - Music by Frédéric Chopin
- Linda Mujer
  - Written by Raphael Duchesne
- Liebestod
  - from Tristan und Isolde
  - Music by Richard Wagner
- Italian Street Song
  - Music by Victor Herbert
  - Lyrics by Rida Johnson Young
- Good Night, Sweetheart
  - Written by Ray Noble, Jimmy Campbell and Reginald Connelly
- Les filles de Cadiz
  - Music by Léo Delibes
  - Lyrics by Alfred de Musset
- Csak Egy Szep Lany
  - Traditional
- The Music Goes 'Round and 'Round
  - Written by Mike Riley, Edward Farley and 'Red' Hodgson
- Three Blind Mice
  - Traditional
- Ave Maria
  - Music by Franz Schubert

== Notes ==
- This film marked Jane Powell's first picture for MGM at the age of 17
- One of several films in which a young Fidel Castro appears as an extra, mostly in crowd scenes.

== Reception ==
The film earned $3,766,000 in the US and Canada and $1,957,000 elsewhere, leading to a profit of $910,000.
