= Guilt (British TV series) =

2019 Scottish TV series

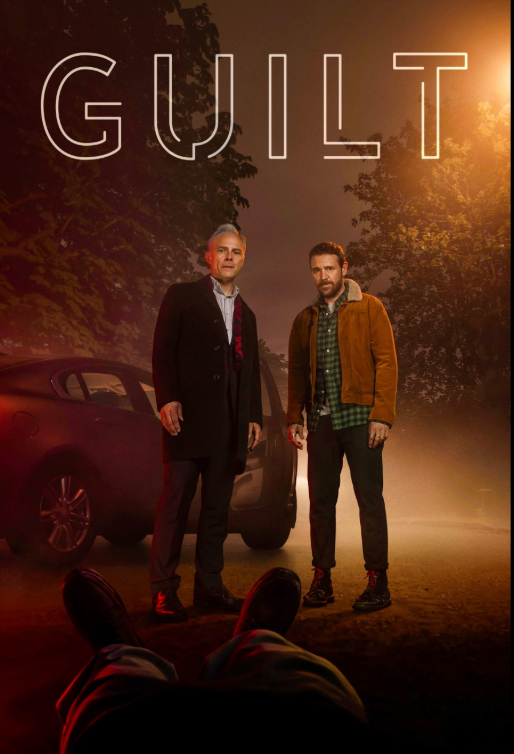
- Written by: Neil Forsyth
- Directed by: Robert McKillop; Patrick Harkins
- Starring: Mark Bonnar; Jamie Sives; Ruth Bradley; Sian Brooke; Bill Paterson; Ellie Haddington; Emun Elliott; Moyo Akandé; Phyllis Logan; Sara Vickers; Greg McHugh; Gregor Firth; Stuart Bowman; Ian Pirie
- Country of origin: United Kingdom
- Original language: English
- No. of series: 3
- No. of episodes: 12

Production
- Producers: Neil Forsyth; Neil Webster; Kirstie MacDonald; Jules Hussey; Eric Coulter
- Running time: 50–55 minutes
- Production companies: Expectation Entertainment; Happy Tramp North; BBC Scotland; BBC Studios

Original release
- Network: BBC Scotland; BBC Two
- Release: 30 October 2019 – 16 May 2023

Guilt is a Scottish mystery thriller television series. It was the first drama commission of BBC Scotland. Episodes premiered on that channel before being broadcast across the UK on BBC Two. Written and created by Neil Forsyth, Guilt initially centres on two brothers, played by Mark Bonnar and Jamie Sives, who are involved in a hit and run. The series eventually draws a large cast of characters into an ongoing story.

The first series of Guilt was broadcast in 2019, and the second in the autumn of 2021. A third and final series was released in April 2023. The show was a critical hit and was subsequently broadcast around the world.

Guilt is widely regarded as one of the best ever Scottish television dramas. The New York Times has called it "Scotland's most notable TV drama".

== Plot ==
Driving home from a wedding one night, two brothers, Max and Jake, hit and kill an elderly man in Leith. They decide to cover up the accident, beginning a descent into a quicksand of lies and shady characters, with a narrative theme of guilt woven throughout.

== Cast ==
- Mark Bonnar as Max McCall
- Jamie Sives as Jake McCall
- Emun Elliott as Kenny Burns
- Ruth Bradley as Angie Curtis (Series 1, 3)
- Bill Paterson as Roy Lynch (Series 1)
- Stuart Bowman as Roy Lynch (Series 2, 3)
- Phyllis Logan as Maggie Lynch (Series 2, 3)
- Ellie Haddington as Sheila Gemmell (Series 1, 3)
- Sara Vickers as Erin McKee (Series 2, 3)
- Greg McHugh as Teddy McLean (Series 2, 3)
- Henry Pettigrew as DC/PC Stevie Malone (Series 1, 2, 3)
- Stewart Porter as Jim McLean (Series 2, 3)
- Sian Brooke as Claire McCall (Series 1)
- Moyo Akandé as Tina Hicks (Series 1)
- Noof McEwan as Cameron Lovat (Series 1)
- Gregor Firth as Archie (Series 1, 3)
- Angus Miller as Zack (Series 2)
- Ian Pirie as Sandy Ralph (Series 2)
- Amelia Isaac Jones as Skye Burns (Series 3)
- Euan McNaughton as Sir Jim Sturrock (Series 3)
- Isaura Barbe-Brown as Yvonne Nixon (Series 3)

== Episodes ==
=== Series 1 ===
| No. overall | No. in season | Title | Directed by | Written by | Original release date | UK viewers (millions) |
|---|---|---|---|---|---|---|
| 1 | 1 | "Episode 1" | Robert McKillop | Neil Forsyth | 24 October 2019 | N/A |
While driving home from a wedding, brothers Max and Jake accidentally hit and kill Walter. They move his body inside his house and discover that he has terminal cancer. Walter's American niece arrives to deal with his estate and meets Max and Jake at the wake.
| 2 | 2 | "Episode 2" | Robert McKillop | Neil Forsyth | 31 October 2019 | N/A |
Neighbour Sheila blackmails Max as she claims to know what really happened. Max's wife Claire begins an affair with her gym friend Tina.
| 3 | 3 | "Episode 3" | Robert McKillop | Neil Forsyth | 7 November 2019 | N/A |
Jake wants Max to stop being involved in his record shop but it transpires that the shop is being used to launder money. It is revealed that Sheila persuaded Angie to pose as the niece when they previously met in Pitlochry.
| 4 | 4 | "Episode 4" | Robert McKillop | Neil Forsyth | 14 November 2019 | N/A |
Angie and Jake confess the truth to each other. Max pressures Sheila to say that she only saw Jake on the night Walter died. Claire kicks Max out of their home and he is sent to prison.

=== Series 2 ===
| No. overall | No. in season | Title | Directed by | Written by | Original release date | UK viewers (millions) |
|---|---|---|---|---|---|---|
| 5 | 1 | "A New Leith" | Patrick Harkins | Neil Forsyth | 12 October 2021 | N/A |
Max is released from prison and starts work in Kenny's legal practice. Roy Lynch's daughter calls him after her husband is killed by gangsters.
| 6 | 2 | "Phoenix" | Patrick Harkins | Neil Forsyth | 19 October 2021 | N/A |
Max and Kenny find a local minister more of an obstacle than they thought; pressure builds for Erin; Teddy seeks answers.
| 7 | 3 | "White Hats" | Patrick Harkins | Neil Forsyth | 26 October 2021 | N/A |
Max and Erin's relationship grows ever more complicated, as the pressure on Max from his police handler, Jackie, steadily increases.
| 8 | 4 | "The Edinburgh Castle" | Patrick Harkins | Neil Forsyth | 2 November 2021 | N/A |
Max and Jake pick up arguments old and new while the Lynches face their darkest secret; Max offers Erin a way out, but is running out of time to find one for himself.

=== Series 3 ===
| No. | Title | Directed by | Written by | Original release date | UK viewers (millions) |
|---|---|---|---|---|---|
| 1 | "The Clothes on Our Backs" | Patrick Harkins | Neil Forsyth | 25 April 2023 | N/A |
Max and Jake find themselves back in Edinburgh, where they soon face a familiar danger.
| 2 | "You Can Take The Boy Out of Leith" | Patrick Harkins | Neil Forsyth | 2 May 2023 | N/A |
Max and Jake seek refuge with a face from the past in the Highlands but Teddy is on their trail.
| 3 | "Aim High" | Patrick Harkins | Neil Forsyth | 8 May 2023 | N/A |
Max, Jake and their new gang hide from Maggie in Edinburgh.
| 4 | "Let Them Come" | Patrick Harkins | Neil Forsyth | 16 May 2023 | N/A |
Max and Jake have a plan for final victory but so does everyone else.

== Production ==
Forsyth was keen to write a series about siblings, which he has called "the most interesting dramatic relationship", and a show with a leitmotif that ran through all the characters, in this case, guilt. He spent several years developing Guilt before finding a home for it at the BBC. It became the first drama commission for the new BBC Scotland channel, which premiered the episodes of the series a week before they were transmitted nationwide on BBC Two. Forsyth set the show in Edinburgh’s historic port district of Leith, where he lived for many years.

Guilt was produced by Happy Tramp North and Expectation Entertainment.

The first series was directed by Robert McKillop . Although it is primarily set in Edinburgh's Leith area, little of the filming was done in that city; the production team cited the high number of tourists in Edinburgh, as well as the expense of shooting there. Most of the filming instead was done in Glasgow—at a cost 30 percent cheaper than Edinburgh—and East Kilbride, with additional scenes shot in Aberfoyle. Among the filming locations were Charlotte Square in Edinburgh and the Clydebank Docks.

A second series of Guilt was confirmed by the BBC in July 2020, and filming began in Scotland in November 2020. New cast members included Phyllis Logan, Sara Vickers, Stuart Bowman and Iain Pirie. The second series was directed by Patrick Harkins.

A third and final series premiered on April 25, 2023 and was also directed by Patrick Harkins. David Hayman joined the cast. Forsyth explained he had always wanted Guilt to be a trilogy, and he had made the decision to bring the show to an end., after using the three series to cover the themes of Guilt, Revenge and Redemption. .

== Reception ==
Guilt received strong viewing figures and a highly positive critical reception. The Times called it, "An absolute cracker", The Observer, "an utter triumph, a word-of-mouth dazzler", with "welcome Coen brothers echoes". The Telegraph called it a "stealth hit" which "felt like Fargo relocated to Leith, or Midnight Run reimagined by Irvine Welsh". The Independent termed it "the unexpected treat of the year", The Guardian described it as a "darkly delicious tale" that was "fast becoming a word-of-mouth hit", the Radio Times called it "Hitchcockian" and The Herald deemed it the most impressive Scottish small screen debut since the 1987 comedy-drama Tutti Frutti.

The second series was equally well received. The Sunday Times called it "irresistible, just as good as the original", The Herald said it was "among the realms of modern television classics", The Times called it "magnificent, a Scottish Fargo", The Guardian "witty and scintillating", and The Scotsman, "one of Scotland's most acclaimed television dramas".

The third and final series of Guilt also had a positive reception. The Times said it had "some of the best writing of the whole show". The Guardian said it was "a rare thrill". while The Herald said Guilt was "going out with all guns blazing" and remarked, "what a gift Guilt has been for Scottish drama". The New York Times called the third series "a suitably twisty and sardonic send-off".

== Awards ==
The first series of Guilt was nominated for a large number of awards and won 2020 Best Drama at the Scottish BAFTA Awards, the Royal Television Society of Scotland Awards, the Celtic Media Festival, and the Broadcast Digital Awards.

The second series of Guilt was nominated for a large number of awards and won the RTS Scotland Best Drama Award, as well as three Scottish BAFTAS for Best Scripted, Best Writer in Film and Television for Forsyth, and Best Actress in Television for Phyllis Logan.

The third series of Guilt won the RTS Scotland Award for Best Drama, and was nominated for other awards including the Scottish BAFTA for Best Scripted.

== International broadcasts ==
Guilt has been broadcast widely around the world. The Scotsman called Guilt "one of BBC Scotland's biggest ever hits" that had made a mark on the "global TV map".

- In Australia, it was broadcast on BBC First. The Australian called it "clever, stylish and absorbing".
- In France, it was retitled Petit meurtre entre frères ("A Small Murder Between Brothers') by Arte, where Télérama called it Deliciously transgressive, very funny and profoundly human”.
- In Sweden, it was retitled Vår lilla hemlighet ("Our Little Secret") by SVT. Aftonbladet called it "exemplary television craftsmanship".
- In South Africa, it was broadcast by Showmax.
- In Germany, it was retitled Keiner ist schuld (Nobody Is Guilty) by Arte. Filmdienst praised the show’s “impressively drawn characters, pointed dialogues and sophisticated plot twists”.
- In the United States, Guilt premiered on the PBS Network's Masterpiece Mystery series in September 2021. The New York Times called it "tense but textured" with characters that are "funny and well-drawn". An NPR reviewer said that Guilt had "a verve that made me think of the TV series Fargo, which I mean as high praise".
- Guilt was broadcast on RTÉ One in Ireland. The Irish Times called it “fabulously funny … with a mood somewhere between Hitchcock and Danny Boyle”.
- Guilt was broadcast in Portugal by RTP and renamed Culpas e Desculpas (Blame and Excuses).
- Guilt was broadcast in Russia on the Kinopoisk platform.
- Guilt was released in Belgium, retitled Petit Meurtre En Famille (A Small Family Murder) on Arte.
- Guilt was available in Spain on the Filmin platform. El Periódico called Guilt “a classic”.

== Adaptations ==
In August 2021, it was announced that Guilt was being remade in Hindi by Applause Entertainment, starring the Indian actors Jaideep Ahlawat and Mohammed Zeeshan Ayyub. The series was released on ZEE5 on 18 March 2022 and was renamed Bloody Brothers.

An Australian adaptation, titled Reckless, featuring mostly or all First Nations cast and crew and set in Fremantle, Western Australia, premiered on SBS Television and NITV on 12 November 2025.
