= Melanie Reid =

British journalist

Melanie Frances Reid MBE FRSE
- Born: 13 April 1957 (age 69); Barnet, Herts, England
- Occupation: Columnist
- Spouse: David McNeil
- Writing career
- Subject: Disability

Melanie Reid MBE FRSE (born 13 April 1957) is a British journalist. Her weekly column for The Times' magazine, "Spinal Column", was about disability and her life as a disabled person. Her final "Spinal Column" was published in November 2024. She broke her neck and back in April 2010 while horse riding, and is now a tetraplegic. Following her accident, she spent twelve months in the spinal unit of Southern General Hospital in Glasgow, Scotland.

== Career ==
Reid was a columnist at The Herald in Glasgow and a former associate editor of The Sunday Mail before joining The Times and reporting and commentating from Scotland.

Reid said of her writing: "A lot of people take inspiration from it. I have a black sense of humour, I think you have to have in this situation. You have to try to keep going and tell it like it is."

Reid co-wrote actor Gregor Fisher's 2015 autobiography The Boy from Nowhere. A tie-in documentary, In Search of Gregor Fisher, broadcast on BBC One Scotland, followed Reid and Fisher during part of their research for the book. Reid's memoir The World I Fell Out Of was published in 2019 by 4th Estate (HarperCollins) and won the Saltire Non Fiction Book of the Year Award.

She was named 2011 Columnist of the Year in the British Press Awards, and in 2012 she was awarded broadsheet Columnist of the Year. Her column generates hundreds of letters, emails and comments every week. In June 2014, Reid received an honorary degree from the University of Stirling "in recognition of her contribution to journalism, to disability rights and awareness, and for being an inspirational example of human resilience and dignity".

Reid was appointed Member of the Order of the British Empire (MBE) in the 2016 Birthday Honours for services to journalism and to people with disabilities. She was elected a Fellow of the Royal Society of Edinburgh in 2022.

== Personal life ==
Reid was married, has a son, and lives in Stirlingshire, Scotland.
