= David McKay (actor) =

Scottish actor and television director

- Born: David McKay; Glasgow, Scotland
- Occupation(s): Actor, television director
- Height: 5 ft 5 in (1.65 m)

David McKay is a Scottish actor and television director.

In the television series Shoebox Zoo, he played McTaggart who was the Keeper of the Book of Forbidden Knowledge who was bound to stay with Michael Scott (Peter Mullan) until the book is found by Marnie (Vivien Endicott-Douglas). McTaggart has been a number of people in the first series. A tour guide, a servant to Michael and Toledo and a clown. Now as the second series unfolds, he must help Marnie and Michael as much as he can to help find the Book and stop Toledo from taking over and finding the Book before Marnie.

He has also appeared in two Ken Loach films: Ae Fond Kiss... and My Name Is Joe. He has also had roles in Once Upon a Time in the Midlands, Les Misérables (1998), Braveheart and Rab C Nesbitt, among others.

McKay acted in the 1952 American TV show Rendezvous.

He has directed for High Times, The Basil Brush Show, Tinsel Town and My Parents Are Aliens, and has written and directed a short film, Caesar, on pigeon-fancying.

== Music ==
David plays rhythm guitar for the Glasgow stoner rock band Superunknown.
