= Eric Cullen =

Scottish actor (1965–1996)

- Born: Eric Robertson Cullen; 12 July 1965; Hamilton, South Lanarkshire, Scotland
- Died: 16 August 1996 (aged 31); East Kilbride, South Lanarkshire, Scotland
- Occupation: Actor
- Years active: 1978–1996

Eric Robertson Cullen (12 July 1965 – 16 August 1996) was a Scottish actor, who was famous for his role as Wee Burney in BBC's Rab C. Nesbitt. Cullen was born with achondroplasia—a type of dwarfism.

== Early life ==
He was born to a single mother and was adopted by a family from Hamilton. He was diagnosed with achondroplasia at the age of seven.

== Acting career ==
Cullen began acting when he was at school. He started to find roles appearing in several theatre groups before appearing in several Scottish TV programmes in the 1980s, particularly A Kick Up the Eighties. Cullen eventually found lasting fame playing the youngest son, Wee Burney, in the first three series of Rab C. Nesbitt. However, he left the programme in December 1993 owing to personal problems and ill health.

== Victim of abuse ==
Cullen was sexually abused by a violent paedophile ring from the age of thirteen, and since his condition meant that he looked much younger than he was, this abuse continued into his twenties. Once he became a successful actor, his abusers returned to extort money with menaces. As a result, he developed clinical depression and post-traumatic stress disorder.

== Court case ==
Cullen was arrested in July 1993 for possession of child pornography. In 1995, Cullen was convicted of child pornography offences, and his own history of being sexually abused since the age of 13 - and throughout his 20s - was revealed. He explained he been blackmailed into storing child pornography at his home by his abusers—a claim accepted by the Crown. He pleaded guilty in 1995 to a number of minor charges to avoid a potentially harrowing trial. Another adult victim of the same paedophile ring informed Strathclyde Police that the gang had stored extreme child pornography in the houses of various terrorized victims, including him and Eric.

The subsequent police investigation and press coverage resulted in clinical depression when he "finally cracked under a load which had become unbearable". His nine-month prison sentence was reduced to three years' probation on appeal.

Cullen later said: "At no time was I ever accused of child abuse. Yes, I did have those indecent videos in my house. But what was never clearly explained to the public was that I was being blackmailed into keeping them by one of my abusers, and my lawyer advised me to plead guilty to these charges because physically and mentally I couldn't have stood up to a long intense court case. The only time I ever saw those horrific videos was in Hamilton police station, when I was identifying my abuser."

As soon as his prison sentence had been quashed on appeal, he began to be offered acting parts again, but he was still too ill with severe PTSD to resume work.

== Child campaigner ==
Once the court case was out of the way Cullen dedicated himself to campaigning against child pornography, and to trying to bring his abusers to justice. Of the three men he named as his principal abusers one, Francis Currens, was jailed during Cullen's lifetime; one, Cullen's uncle Jack Williams, was jailed after his death (both of them for sexual offences including the repeated rape of young boys); and as of summer 2006 one, whom Cullen named as the ringleader, has never been prosecuted.

In an interview with the Big Issues, given a week before his death, Linda McGarvie writes: "If I die tomorrow," he said, "I want to be remembered not for being a professional victim, but for standing up against my abusers."

"When I'm gone," he joked, adopting a high theatrical accent, "all the luvvies who dropped me so quickly will come out and say what a darling I was."

== Death ==
Only a day or two before his fatal heart attack, which followed on from surgery for a twisted bowel, he had been asked to take up the role of Wee Burney again. He was however in two minds as to whether to resume his acting career or become a clinical psychologist specialising in the treatment of abuse victims; he already had a BA in psychology, and had been accepted to begin a more advanced course in forensic psychology that autumn.

== Acting career ==
- Huntingtower
- Playfair
- The Camerons
- Govan Ghost Story
- Deathwatch
- A Kick Up the Eighties
- Laugh??? I Nearly Paid My Licence Fee
- Scotch & Wry
- Out With the Old (1993) (STV's Hogmanay Show)
- Rab C Nesbitt
