= Iain McColl =

British actor (1954–2013)

Iain McColl (27 January 1954 – 4 July 2013) was a Scottish film and television actor. McColl starred on City Lights, a BBC Scotland sitcom, from 1984 to 1991. He then co-starred on the BBC Two sitcom, Rab C Nesbitt during its first run (1988–1999). He rejoined the cast of Rab C Nesbitt again when the show was revived in 2008. Additionally, he appeared in other television shows, including Hamish Macbeth, Still Game and Taggart. McColl was cast in a small role in the 2002 American film, Gangs of New York, directed by Martin Scorsese.

In 1994 he guest starred alongside his Rab C Nesbitt co star Gregor Fisher in episode 5 of The Tales of Para Handy in which, he played a religious madman who held the ships crew hostage.

Iain McColl died from complications of cancer on 4 July 2013, aged 59.
