= Only Child (TV series) =

British comedy television series

- Genre: Sitcom
- Screenplay by: Bryce Hart
- Directed by: Al Campbell; Holly Walsh; John Addis
- Starring: Gregor Fisher; Greg McHugh
- Theme music composer: toydrum
- Country of origin: United Kingdom
- Original language: English
- No. of series: 2
- No. of episodes: 12

Production
- Executive producer: Neil Webster
- Producer: Ursula Haworth
- Production company: Happy Tramp North

Original release
- Network: BBC Scotland
- Release: 21 November 2024 – 8 June 2026

Only Child is a British television sitcom starring Gregor Fisher and Greg McHugh. It ran for two series, premiering on BBC Scotland on 21 November 2024. The second series was commissioned in May 2025 and released the following year.

== Synopsis ==
Richard Pritchard, an actor, returns from London to visit his recently widowed father Ken in his family home in Forres in Moray.

== Cast and characters ==
- Gregor Fisher as Ken Pritchard
- Greg McHugh as Richard Pritchard
- Amy Lennox as Emily, Ken's neighbour and Richard's schoolfriend
- Clare Barrett as Jen
- Robin Laing as Ian
- Jenny Galloway as Beth
- Kevin Bishop as Tim
- Paul Rattray as Digsy, Richard's schoolfriend
- Stuart Bowman as Rod, Ken's next-door neighbour
- Forbes Masson as Crawford
- Jennifer Saunders as Sally (voice), Richard's inept agent
- Belinda Owusu as Dr Roach, Ken’s Doctor

== Production ==
The six-part series is a Happy Tramp North production. It is written by Bryce Hart and directed by Al Campbell and Holly Walsh. The producer is Ursula Haworth and the executive producer is Neil Webster.

The cast is led by Gregor Fisher and Greg McHugh, which McHugh described working closely with Fisher as a "dream come true". McHugh also said the character of Richard is "the closest I have played to myself in terms of a character. I sometimes find him a bit annoying. Although, people might say that about me who know me." The cast includes Forbes Masson, Amy Lennox, Clare Barrett, Robin Laing, Paul Rattray and Jennifer Saunders in a voice role. Themes developed in the series include mortality, ageing, parent-child relationships and intergenerational differences.

The series began filming in Scotland in July 2024. Filming locations including Glasgow, Whitecraigs Railway Station and Barrhead. Filming on the second series took place in August 2025.

The series was not renewed for a third series. Gregor Fisher revealed he'd been notified of the cancellation on 18 August 2026.

== Episodes ==
=== Series overview ===
Series	Episodes	Originally released	
Series	Episodes	First released	Last released
1	6	21 November 2024	21 November 2024
2	6	4 May 2026	4 May 2026

=== Series 1 (2024) ===
No. overall	No. in series	Title	Directed by	Written by	Original release date
1	1	"Eh?"	Al Campbell, Holly Walsh	Bryce Hart	21 November 2024
2	2	"Raisins"	Al Campbell	Bryce Hart	21 November 2024
3	3	"Team Pritchard"	Al Campbell	Bryce Hart	21 November 2024
4	4	"The Thespian"	Al Campbell	Bryce Hart	21 November 2024
5	5	"Who's Brian?"	Al Campbell	Bryce Hart	21 November 2024
6	6	"The Long Goodbye"	Al Campbell	Bryce Hart	21 November 2024

=== Series 2 (2026) ===
No. overall	No. in series	Title	Directed by	Written by	Original release date
7	1	"Growing"	John Addis	Bryce Hart	4 May 2026
8	2	"Seize the Day-Lewis"	John Addis	Bryce Hart	4 May 2026
9	3	"Dual Control"	John Addis	Bryce Hart	4 May 2026
10	4	"Training Day"	John Addis	Bryce Hart	4 May 2026
11	5	"Secrets and Ladders"	John Addis	Bryce Hart	4 May 2026
12	6	"TBC"	John Addis	Bryce Hart	4 May 2026

== Broadcast ==
Series 1 premiered on BBC Scotland on 21 November 2024 and on BBC One 22 November 2024.

Series 2 premiered on 4 May 2026 on BBC Scotland and BBC iPlayer, and 6 May 2026 on BBC One.

== Reception ==
Alison Rowat in The Herald praised the humour in the series and said "the best thing about Only Child, however, is the casting… Individually, Fisher and McHugh are class acts. Together, they are a dream ticket. It’s as if they've been together for years." Rachel Aroesti in The Guardian also praised the humour saying "I laughed out loud five times during the first three minutes.. Bryce Hart’s script is meticulously dense with gags, delivered with exemplary timing by its two leads. In other words, it’s pretty funny".
