= Ian Pattison =

Scottish writer

- Born: 1950 (age 75–76); Glasgow
- Occupation: Writer
- Notable work: Rab C Nesbitt, Bad Boys.

Ian Pattison is a Scottish writer who was born in Glasgow in 1950. He is best known for writing all 10 series and 6 specials of the sitcom Rab C Nesbitt. He also wrote the 1995 to 1996 BBC sitcom Atletico Partick, the six-episode series Breeze Block starring Tim Healy which aired on BBC Choice in 2002, and created and co-wrote the sitcom The Crouches which aired on BBC One from 2003 to 2005. He has written five novels including Sweet and Tender Hooligan, Looking at the Stars, Unhappy Go Lucky and A Stranger Here Myself, the latter being Rab C Nesbitt's "autobiography". Additionally, he has written several plays for theatre, including the award-winning Faye's Red Lines at the Edinburgh Fringe in 2025.
