= Rab C. Nesbitt =

Scottish TV comedy series

- Title card (1988–2014)
- Genre: Comedy
- Created by: Ian Pattison
- Written by: Ian Pattison
- Directed by: Colin Gilbert
- Starring: Gregor Fisher; Elaine C. Smith; Tony Roper; Barbara Rafferty; Andrew Fairlie; Brian Pettifer; Iain McColl; Eric Cullen; Iain Robertson; Elaine Ellis
- Theme music composer: David McNiven
- Opening theme: Theme from Rab C. Nesbitt
- Ending theme: Theme from Rab C. Nesbitt
- Country of origin: Scotland
- Original languages: Scots, Glaswegian dialect
- No. of series: 10
- No. of episodes: 67 (including 6 specials) (list of episodes)

Production
- Producer: Colin Gilbert
- Production location: Govan, Glasgow
- Running time: 30–50 minutes

Original release
- Network: BBC1 (1988); BBC2 (1990–2014)
- Release: 22 December 1988 – 2 January 2014

Related
- Naked Video

Rab C. Nesbitt is a Scottish comedy television series that originally aired between 1988 and 1999. The show returned for a one–off special in 2008, before being re-commissioned in 2010. Its second run was broadcast from 2010 to 2014. The series has been described as "Glasgow's greatest ever sitcom" by BBC Two.

Produced by BBC Scotland and created and written by Ian Pattison, it focuses on the title character, Robert "Rab" C. Nesbitt (portrayed by Gregor Fisher), an alcoholic Glaswegian who seeks unemployment as a lifestyle choice. Rab C. Nesbitt was originally a recurring character in the BBC2 sketch series Naked Video (1986–1990).

The revived series broadcast attracted an audience figure of 2 million. At its peak, Rab C. Nesbitt attracted viewing figures of roughly 5 million.

== Background ==
The pilot episode, made for BBC Scotland in 1988, was a Christmas special entitled Rab C Nesbitt's Seasonal Greet, which was broadcast on 22 December 1988 and then repeated on the network the following year. The first series began on 27 September 1990 and continued for seven more, ending on 18 June 1999.

Ian Pattison created and wrote all 65 episodes, and Colin Gilbert produced and directed every episodes. Topics include alcoholism, Neo Nazis and sexually transmitted infections. Often several normally unapproachable subjects were used in the same episode. The series is also known for its uncompromising use of Glaswegian accents and dialect, and its technique of breaking the fourth wall by frequently having Rab address the viewer directly.

The series featured guest appearances from Norman Lovett, Peter Mullan, Rikki Fulton, Mary Lee, Anita Dobson, Timothy Spall, Stanley Baxter, Kevin McNally, Clive Russell, Jerry Sadowitz, Viv Lumsden, Sylvester McCoy, Russell Hunter, Peter Capaldi and then-unknowns David Tennant, Ashley Jensen, Ford Kiernan, Greg Hemphill, Karen Dunbar, Elaine Ellis, Jane McCarry and Paul Riley. Series 10 episode 2 featured an appearance by Scottish singer Susan Boyle, who was the runner-up on Britain's Got Talent in 2009.

The show returned for a one-off special on 23 December 2008. Rab's son, Gash, now has a daughter, Peaches; his wife Mary and friend Ella have set up in business together as cleaners (and Jamesie, Rab and sometimes Gash all work for their company, House Mice); and Rab himself has converted to Christianity and given up alcohol.

A ninth series of six episodes began airing on 21 January 2010. The show's return received a good critical response and high audience figures, leading to a tenth series being commissioned by the BBC for broadcast in 2011. Filming for the series commenced in February 2010, and began broadcasting in October 2011. A new year's special was aired on BBC Two on 2 January 2014.

The series was taken live on tour in 1991, known as Rab C. Nesbitt: In the Flesh, thus meaning that no new series was broadcast that year. A live recording of the tour was released on VHS in 1992 as Rab C. Nesbitt: Live. Two script books accompanying the series have also been released, alongside Rab's autobiography, a novel entitled A Stranger Here Myself.

== Cast and characters ==
Rab C. Nesbitt characters (early 1990s). From left to right: Seated Rab (Gregor Fisher), Mary (Elaine C. Smith), Ella (Barbara Rafferty) Standing Gash (Andrew Fairlie), Jamesie (Tony Ropper), Burney (Eric Cullen)

=== Nesbitt family ===
Robert "Rab" C. Nesbitt
Gregor Fisher (1988–2014). An alcoholic without denial, sarcastic, deadbeat, self-styled "street philosopher" and "sensitive big bastard", although "sensitive by Govan standards". Described by his wife Mary as not "an unemployed person" but "the original unemployed person", Rab is very rarely seen in anything other than a shabby pinstripe suit, plimsolls, a filthy headband and a string vest. He has two sons, Gash and Burney. Rab has four brothers, all dead; Rab only survived because he was the only one out of the five who was able to understand the benefits form. He claims to have been talented as a teenager, but never went anywhere with it due to Govan-dwellers being scared of talent when they saw it and tried "tae batter it tae death wi' empty wine bottles". At some point before the episode "Clean" he managed to clean up his act, giving up alcohol, helping around the house, finding religion, and presiding over a temperance group; so far he has only relapsed on-screen twice. He is also shown to break the fourth wall.
Mary "Mary Doll" Nesbitt (née Regan)
Elaine C. Smith (1988–2014). Rab's long-suffering wife, more functional and aspirational than her husband. Claims that on the day she was born it was a toss-up whether she or the dog's litter would end up at the bottom of the river Clyde in a sack (Burney: "She won. There's nae bloody justice, eh?"). Currently runs a successful house-cleaning business with Ella Cotter called the "House Mice". Mary has repeatedly split up with Rab over the course of the show and has often flirted with other townsfolk to try to get back at him. However, somehow, she and Rab always seem to get back together, usually for the sake of the "weans" ("little ones"). Mary has had a lot of odd-jobs over the years, often taken as a quickie to pay off a final demand bill or outstanding arrears. Mary has stuck by Rab through many tough situations over the years.
Gash Nesbitt
Andrew Fairlie until 2008, Iain Robertson 2010–2011 (1988–2011). The Nesbitts' elder son. Described by his father as "so anal-retentive he's still shitein' rusks." Has dabbled with Christianity, hard drugs, Hare Krishna, Scottish nationalism, and ram-raiding BT shops in his efforts to find himself. He has an on-off girlfriend, Bridie, and by the time of the show's return, now has a teenage daughter, Peaches, whom the Nesbitts dote upon. Rab has often taken more interest in Gash than his other son, Burney, and seems to favour Gash as he doesn't give as much lip. Fairlie left the role following the 2008 special, and Robertson was re-cast in the role and appeared from 2010.
Burney Nesbitt
Eric Cullen (1988–1993). The Nesbitts' younger son, who briefly dabbled with neo-Nazism. Was also discovered to be gifted at painting, although gave up this avenue when he realised it wasn't getting him any sex. Burney often gave his father more grief than his brother, and often became more of a nuisance in his father's eyes. Actor Eric Cullen left the programme following series three due to personal issues, and was replaced by David McKay's Screech. Cullen died in 1996, shortly after he was asked to return to the role of Burney for the 1997 series. In the 2008 Christmas special, it is revealed that Burney died in a "ramming" accident and was buried nearby.
Screech Nesbitt
David McKay (1994–1997). Rab's nephew, who replaces Eric Cullen's Burney from 1994. Screech comes to live with the Nesbitts after Burney goes to live in at a boarding school. Screech is much more outspoken that his predecessor, and has much more of a rebellious side. He seems to get along with Gash better than Burney did. Actor David McKay earlier portrayed Young Young McGurn's son Bimbo in "That's Entertainment", and was cast in the role of Screech following his initial appearance in 1992. McKay left the role in 1997.

=== Cotter family ===
James Aaron "Jamesie" Cotter
Tony Roper (1988–2014). Rab's longtime friend, as well as chronic serial philanderer and self-described 'scumbag'. Jamesie is always seen with his trademark shabby sports jacket and bottle of Irn-Bru. On one occasion, he was described by his wife as "a slippery-lookin' article, about 93-year-old, wearing crusty jeans, with the eyes of an unemployed rapist". On several occasions he has played the part of the devil on Rab's shoulder, urging him to take up drinking again in "Clean". His attitude towards women (he is very keen on having sexual relations with any number of women but refuses to trust them) is implied to have stemmed from a traumatic relationship with his cancer-ridden mother; he spent much of his childhood tending to her, receiving little but abuse in return. It was known that he was once a football player until sustaining a shoulder injury which had forced him to quit.
Ella Cotter (née Wilson)
Barbara Rafferty (1988–2014). Jamesie's fiery wife, with her red beehive haircut and leopard skin coat. Seems to loathe her husband and frequently considers murdering him. In the meantime, she enjoys torturing him on occasion, notably breaking his shoulder with a crowbar and scratching his sunburnt chest. She has stabbed him at least once. She is every bit as promiscuous as Jamesie. She is part of a house-cleaning business with Mary, called The House Mice. Ella and Jamesie have never had children, due to the fact that Ella had gynaecological problems, a fact which Jamesie cruelly rubs in her face when he gets another woman pregnant.

=== Pub regulars ===
Andra Binnie
Brian Pettifer (1988–2014). One of Rab's best friends, described more than once as looking "like a Ninja Turtle". Married to a woman called Bobbie whom he finds so repulsive that he dry heaves when thinking about sleeping with her. Andra has a comb-over haircut and is often mocked for being less adventurous than his counterparts. Andra was a regular in the Two Ways Inn before its closure, and quickly transferred his custom to the Giblet. Pettifer reprised the role for the 2014 special, the only pub regular to appear in the episode.
George "Dodie"
Alex Norton in 1988, Iain McColl from 1990–2011 (1988–2011). Another of Rab's best friends. Dodie is implied to be fond of unconventional methods of intoxication, e.g. sniffing shoe polish, and had an interest in crossdressing also. He too, like Andra, has an insufferable wife whom he loathes and he retches when he thinks about sleeping with her. Dodie did not appear in the 2008 special or Series 9. He also did not appear in the 2014 special, as McColl had died in 2013 following complications from a cancer diagnosis. McColl was not replaced in the role.
Dougie Timmins
Charlie Sim (1988–1992). The barman of the Two Ways Inn. He was the original owner of the pub before handing the pub over to Norrie following his retirement. Dougie was much more bitter and sour than his successor, and was less tolerant of the acts of the pub regulars than his successor. Sims left the role in 1992 and was replaced by Kazek in the role of Norrie.
Norrie Bonnar
John Kazek (1992–1999). The barman of the Two Ways Inn. Norrie takes over the running of the pub after Dougie gives up the job. Norrie is much more tolerant but often steps in when violence is about to break out. Norrie has more of a sensitive side and is willing to show some sympathy when required. He tries to update the pub with foreign grub and games machines. Before he worked in the pub, he was a psychiatric nurse.
Camille
Cora Bissett (2010–2011). The barmaid of The Giblet since its opening in 2010. During the episode "Passion", she was the object of both Gash and Jamesie's affections. Bisset did not appear in the 2014 special.

=== Recurring cast ===
Hugh "Shug"
Sean Scanlan (1990–1999). Mary's maternal cousin, Hugh feigns Englishness or at least pretends to be a middle-class Scot due to Scottish cultural cringe and to the distaste displayed at anything working-class and/or Scottish by his wife Phoebe. Hugh is Mary's cousin, and moved to Sidcup at some point in the 1980s.
Phoebe
Sara Corper until 1993, Sarah Crowden until 1996, Juliet Cadzow in 1999 (1990–1999). An extremely middle-class English woman, married to Hugh. Phoebe is ashamed of his Scottish roots and often displays her disgust when his heritage begins to show.
Bridie Grogan
Nicola Park (1998–2011). Gash's on-off girlfriend, with whom he has a daughter, Peaches. Bridie first appeared in Series 8, and returned to the role for the ninth and tenth series. Park did not appear in the 2014 special.
Peaches Nesbitt
Rachael Crossan (2010–2011), Anna Devitt (2014). Gash and Bridie's daughter, upon whom all the Nesbitts dote. Peaches is a teenager by the time of the 2014 special. Crossan originally portrayed Peaches for series nine and ten. However, she did not return for the 2014 special and Devitt was cast in the role instead, making her first appearance.

== Reception ==
=== Ratings ===
Series	No.	Title	Airdate	Total viewers (millions)	Rank
Series 7	1	"New"	21 August 1998	3.70	5
Series 7	2	"Coctails"	28 August 1998	3.23	5
Series 7	3	"Duel"	4 September 1998	2.73	8
Series 7	4	"Property"	11 September 1998	2.94	10
Series 7	5	"Community"	18 September 1998	3.16	13
Series 7	6	"Back"	25 September 1998	3.46	5
Series 8	1	"Heat"	14 May 1999	2.71	11
Series 8	2	"Commons"	21 May 1999	3.09	9
Series 8	3	"Night"	28 May 1999	2.80	9
Series 8	4	"Fruit"	4 June 1999	2.70	11
Series 8	5	"Bug"	11 June 1999	2.47	8
Series 8	6	"Trips"	18 June 1999	2.20	19
Special: "Clean"			23 December 2008	3.70	2
Series 9	1	"Heal"	21 January 2010	2.28	24
Series 9	2	"Signal"	28 January 2010	2.02	25
Series 9	3	"Candy"	4 February 2010	1.94	27
Series 9	4	"Passion"	11 February 2010	1.70*	—N/a
Series 9	5	"Muse"	18 February 2010	1.66	30
Series 9	6	"Bottle"	25 February 2010	1.74	27
Series 10	1	"Broke"	5 October 2011	2.32	7
Series 10	2	"Fugue"	12 October 2011	1.92	16
Series 10	3	"Cuts"	19 October 2011	1.40*	—N/a
Series 10	4	"Fight"	26 October 2011	1.50*	—N/a
Series 10	5	"Role"	2 November 2011	1.40*	—N/a
Series 10	6	"Stool"	9 November 2011	1.30*	—N/a
Special: "Hoodie"			2 January 2014	2.32	16

(*) Asterisk indicates overnight figure.

=== Awards and nominations ===
Year	Group	Award	Result	Ref.
1989	Celtic Media Festival	Best Entertainment Programme	Won	
1991	Royal Television Society	Best Situation Comedy	Won	
1991	Rose d'Or	Special Mention for 1991 episode "Holiday"		
1992	BAFTA Scotland	Best Entertainment Programme	Won	
1994	BAFTA	Best Comedy Programme	Nominated	
1997	BAFTA Scotland	Best Entertainment Programme	Nominated	
2009	BAFTA Scotland	Best Entertainment Programme	Won	
2011	BAFTA Scotland	Best Entertainment Programme	Nominated	
2012	BAFTA Scotland	Best TV Actor: Gregor Fisher	Won	
2012	BAFTA Scotland	Best TV Actor: Elaine C. Smith	Nominated	

== Home media ==
Rab C. Nesbitt was initially released on VHS via BBC Video between 1991 and 1997. The first five series and two specials, "Seasonal Greet" and "Fitba", were made available, as well as a 'best of' compilation video. The series commenced releasing on DVD format in 2004, where the first five series were distributed by John Williams Productions, and in addition to the individual sets, boxsets, including a set comprising the first and second series alongside "Seasonal Greet", a standalone set of "Fitba" and "Home", and a collection set containing series one to five, which also included "Fitba" and "Home", but excluded "Seasonal Greet". Distribution rights to the series were acquired by 2 Entertain in 2007, in which they released the sixth, seventh and eighth series in both individual sets and a boxset collection, as well as the 2008 return special "Clean". In 2009 a boxset was made available which consisted of all eight series, and all specials, including the previously unreleased special "More". This was followed by releases of both series nine and series ten. The 2014 special "Hoodie", has yet to be released.

Title	Episodes	No. of discs	Release date (Region 2)	BBFC rating
Rab C Nesbitt’s Seasonal Greet	1	1	29 November 2004	PG
Rab C Nesbitt: The Complete Series 1	6	1	5 July 2004	PG
Rab C Nesbitt: The Complete Series 2	6	1	18 October 2004	15
Rab C Nesbitt: Series 1 and 2 (incl. Seasonal Greet)	13	3	14 February 2005	15
Rab C Nesbitt: The Complete Series 3	6	1	28 March 2005	15
Rab C Nesbitt: Series 4	6	1	1 August 2005	15
Rab C Nesbitt: Series 5	6	1	4 December 2006	15
Rab C Nesbitt: Fitba & Home	2	1	26 February 2007	12
The Rab C Nesbitt Collection: Series 1–5 (incl. Fitba & Home)	32	6	8 October 2007	15
Rab C Nesbitt: Series 6	6	1	15 October 2007	12
Rab C Nesbitt: Series 7	6	1	15 October 2007	12
Rab C Nesbitt: Series 8	6	1	15 October 2007	15
Rab C Nesbitt: Series 6–8 Boxset	18	3	15 October 2007	15
The 2008 Return of Rab C Nesbitt (aka Clean)	1	1	29 December 2008	15
Rab C Nesbitt: The Complete Series 1–8 (incl. all specials)	53	10	19 October 2009	15
Rab C Nesbitt: Series 9	6	1	1 March 2010	15
Rab C Nesbitt: Series 10	6	1	12 December 2011	15

== Legacy and influence ==
Johnny Depp based his Glaswegian accent for the role of Tarrant Hightopp, The Mad Hatter in the 2010 film Alice in Wonderland, on Rab C Nesbitt's.

== Awards ==
Year	Category	Nominated for	Result	Ref.
1991	RTS Awards	Situation Comedy	Won	
