= List of VideoGaiden episodes =

This is a list of episodes for the BBC Scotland show videoGaiden, an entertainment show with a magazine format, dedicated to video game reviews, gaming features, and comedy sketches based on gaming culture. The show's format was adapted from the internet television show Consolevania, featuring the same lead presenters and some of the same supporting cast. Production of the two shows overlapped during their initial period of production in 2005–08.

The first series of videoGaiden was broadcast in late 2005 and the second in late 2006. The main run of the third series (2007–08) was released online, with three TV specials. The show was cancelled following the third series, but returned for a run of six online episodes and one TV special in early 2016. No further episodes have yet been commissioned.

33 episodes were produced during the show's original 2005–08 run, while a further 7 episodes were produced in 2016, making a total of 40.

== Series overview ==
Series	Episodes	Originally released	
Series	Episodes	First released	Last released
1	6	5 November 2005	10 December 2005
2	6	5 November 2006	10 December 2006
3	21	1 December 2007	4 April 2008
4	7	3 March 2016	14 April 2016

== Episodes ==
=== Series One (2005) ===
The first series of videoGaiden was broadcast on BBC Two Scotland.

No. overall	No. in series	Title	Original release date	Length
1	1	"Episode One"	5 November 2005	09'08"
Reviews: Call of Cthulhu: Dark Corners of the Earth (Rab), The Suffering: Ties That Bind (Ryan). Quick Review: Resident Evil 4 (PS2). Sketches: DevCo, Benny's Games Pitch: Black and White Minstrel Show 2007, Mr. Pyramid Head: Pizza, Legend: press conference. Top 100: Rez (Rab) and Chuckie Egg (Ryan).
2	2	"Episode Two"	12 November 2005	09'04"
Reviews: Psychonauts (Ryan), WWE SmackDown! vs. Raw 2006 (Rab). Quick Reviews: WRC: Rally Evolved (PS2), The Warriors. Sketches: Benny's Games Pitch: Firehelmet Bloodarms, DevCo, Agent 765 (Splinter Cell Spoof). Top 100: Final Fantasy VII (Rab) and Hired Guns (Ryan) + Mortal Kombat (Rab) and Street Fighter III (Ryan). Notes: Designs for 'Manpuncher versus Boxhead' (a reference to Consolevania 2.1) are shown on a whiteboard in the DevCo sketch. Rab wears the mask of El Zomba (from Consolevania) while reviewing WWE SmackDown! vs. Raw.
3	3	"Episode Three"	19 November 2005	09'01"
Reviews: City of Villains (PC) (Rab), GUN (Ryan). Quick Reviews: Half-Life 2 (Xbox), Star Wars: Battlefront II. Sketches: Legend: photoshoot, Mr. Pyramid Head: First Kiss, Benny's Games Pitch: UK Gurning Championships 2006. Top 100: Ico (Rab) and Moonstone (Ryan). Notes: The Games Pitch segment features a guest appearance from Nigel Buckland, co-presenter of cult Channel 4 video review programme Vids.
4	4	"Episode Four"	26 November 2005	09'12"
Reviews: True Crime: New York City (Rab), Peter Jackson's King Kong: The Official Game of the Movie (Ryan). Quick Reviews: From Russia with Love, Mario Smash Football (GameCube). Sketches: Barry Inoki reporting from Tokyo on the Nintendo 'Revolution', DevCo, Legend: in makeup. Top 100: Half-Life (Rab) and M.U.L.E. (Ryan).
5	5	"Episode Five"	3 December 2005	09'06"
Reviews: Chronicles of Narnia: The Lion, The Witch and the Wardrobe (Rab), Prince of Persia: The Two Thrones (Ryan). Quick Reviews: Battlefield 2: Special Forces (PC), Genji (PS2). Sketches: Barry Inoki reporting from Cardiff for the launch of the Xbox 360, Legend: rap album. Top 100: Star Control II (Rab) and Hover Bovver (Ryan).
6	6	"Episode Six"	10 December 2005	10'03"
Reviews: Kameo (Xbox 360) (Ryan), Need for Speed: Most Wanted (Rab). Quick Reviews: Naked War sneak preview, Call of Duty 2. Sketches: Barry Inoki reporting from Los Angeles on his interview with J Allard, Legend: back in Milwaukee. Top 100: Jimmy White's Snooker (Rab) and Another World (Ryan). Notes: Final appearance of Legend in either videoGaiden or Consolevania. Naked War received a full review in episode 2.7 of Consolevania.

=== Series Two (2006) ===
The second series of videoGaiden was broadcast on BBC Two Scotland.

No. overall	No. in series	Title	Original release date	Length
7	1	"Episode One"	5 November 2006	28'53"
Reviews: Dead Rising (Xbox 360) (Rab), Disgaea 2: Cursed Memories (PS2) (Ryan). Quick Reviews: Armored Core: Last Raven (PS2), Gitaroo Man Lives! (PSP). Sketches: Shenmue 3 Campaign (hijacked by Paperboy), Death of a Console: GameCube, Gamecube Essentials (Killer7, Resident Evil 4, P.N.03, Paper Mario, Eternal Darkness), Influences of Animal Crossing (feat. the voices of Glen Michael and Sanjeev Kohli), Gaiden Guide To... You, The Eternal Pixel: Xbox Live Vision, Warnings From History: Godai (3DO), Socrates Recommends: Virtual Pro Wrestling 2 (N64). Top 100: Tony Hawk's Pro Skater 2 (Rab), Operation Flashpoint (Ryan). Notes: Gaiden Man is played throughout this series by Gavin Mitchell. Two of Consolevania's supporting cast appear: Kenny Swanston as 'Paperboy', and Joanne Daly in the Shenmue 3 campaign segment as 'Mister Joanne'; Daly appears in every Shenmue segment in this series. The headshots of Rab and Ryan used for the 'Shenmometer' first appeared in episode 1.8 of Consolevania.
8	2	"Episode Two"	12 November 2006	29'01"
Reviews: NHL 07 vs. NHL 2K7 (Rab), Just Cause (Ryan). Quick Reviews: Lumines II (PSP), Pathologic. Sketches: Bomberman Postman, Gaiden Man: Space Raiders, Brain Training DVD Commentary (Rab and Ryan with Nigel Buckland), Death of a Console: Xbox (Xbox essentials: Morrowind, Freedom Fighters, Breakdown, Stranger's Wrath, Dreamfall: The Longest Journey), Shenmue 3 Campaign (interrupted by Gordon Bennett from Hover Bovver), Gaiden Guide To... Games Journalism, The Eternal Pixel: Game-On, Warnings From History: Jurassic Park Interactive (3DO), Socrates Recommends: Clock Tower 3 (PS2). Top 100: Duke Nukem (Rab), LocoRoco (Ryan). Notes: Bomberman Postman is played by Florence's frequent writing partner Iain Connell. Gordon Bennett is played by Richard Rankin. The J Allard mask used in the GameCube segment appears in Consolevania 2.5.
9	3	"Episode Three"	19 November 2006	28'29"
Reviews: Sam & Max (PC) (Ryan), DEFCON (PC) (Rab). Quick Reviews: Europa Universalis III (PC), Albatross 18: Season 2 (PC). Sketches: Gaiden Man: Bath, Making Music with Music 3000 (PS2) (adjudicated by John McLaughlin), Death of a Console: PlayStation 2, PS2 Essentials: Silent Hill 2, Fire Pro R, Klonoa 2, Sky Odyssey, Vice City), Shenmue 3 Campaign (interrupted by 'Lara Croft'), Gaiden Guide To... Games Violence, Warnings From History: Virtual Hydlide (Saturn), Socrates Recommends: Culdcept (DC, PS2). Top 100: BurgerTime (Rab) and Twisted (Ryan), World of Warcraft (Rab) and Serious Sam (Ryan). Notes: 'Lara Croft' is played by Louise Stewart. The Ken Kutaragi mask used in the PS2 segment appears in two episodes of Consolevania (2.5 and 3.1).
10	4	"Episode Four"	26 November 2006	28'44"
Reviews: Ōkami (PS2) (Ryan), Rule of Rose (PS2) (Rab). Quick Reviews: Desperate Housewives: The Game (PC), Canis Canem Edit (PS2). Sketches: Gaiden Man: Guardian Heroes, Real Life Katamari Damacy, Shenmue 3 Campaign (interrupted by a disgusted former fan), Rab vs. The View at Guitar Hero II, Gaiden Guide To... Games TV, Warnings From History: FightBox, Socrates Recommends: Hover Bovver (C64). Notes: The disgruntled fan is played, incognito, by Kenny Swanston (the implication being that he prefers Consolevania to videoGaiden).
11	5	"Episode Five"	3 December 2006	29'07"
Reviews: Gears of War (Xbox 360) (Ryan), Need for Speed: Carbon (Rab). Quick Reviews: Call of Duty 3, PDC World Championship Darts. Sketches: Gaiden Man: First Word, Making Games (adjudicated by Charlie Brooker, Shenmue 3 Campaign, Gaiden Guide To... Collecting Games, Rob and Ryan do Cosplay, Warnings From History: Deep Fear, The Eternal Pixel: the Wii, Socrates Recommends: Elite(C64). Top 100: GoldenEye (Ryan) and Ghost Recon (Rab). Notes: Florence and Macleod later appeared on Charlie Brooker's Gameswipe (2009), and Florence alone on How Videogames Changed the World (2013).
12	6	"Episode Six"	10 December 2006	28'43"
Reviews: Viva Piñata (Xbox 360) (Ryan), God Hand (PS2) (Rab). Quick Reviews: World Series of Poker: Tournament of Champions (Xbox 360), Kudos (PC). Sketches: Gaiden Man: Goodbyeden, the videoGaiden Awards 2006 part 1 (Rab and Ryan hijack the Edge awards, Game of the Year: Hitman: Blood Money), the end of the Shenmue 3 Campaign, the videoGaiden Awards 2006 part 2 (the Sixth Doctor (Colin Baker) inducts Chuckie Egg, M.U.L.E., Digitiser, and the Nintendo DS into the videoGaiden Time Capsule), Warnings From History: Ninja Commando, The Death of Socrates. Top 100: P.N.03 (Rab) and Dead or Alive Xtreme Beach Volleyball (Ryan). Notes: Iain Connell makes a cameo appearance in the God Hand review. Hitman: Blood Money was not reviewed on videoGaiden, but received a full review in episode 2.6 of Consolevania.

=== Series Three (2007-08) ===
The third series of videoGaiden was announced on 14 October 2007. In addition to the main series comprising 18 episodes, which was released online via the show's site on BBC Online, three specials were also broadcast on BBC Two Scotland.

No. overall	No. in series	Title	Original release date	Length
13	1	"Complaint"	1 December 2007	11'51"
Overview: Rab and Ryan read out viewer "compliments". Reviews: Super Mario Galaxy (Wii) (Rab), Assassin's Creed (Xbox 360) (Ryan). Quick Review: F.E.A.R. Perseus Mandate (Xbox 360). Sketches: Zack Eastwood: gaming perspiration, The Memory Parlour, Hunter and Rayorg 1: birth of Rab and Ryan, Tom Rezillo's fear of death, what to expect from videoGaiden. Notes: Zack Eastwood (played by Limmy) previously appeared in the Consolevania episode 'C' (episode 3.4).
14	2	"Miscommunication"	7 December 2007	13'19"
Overview: Rab and Ryan get drunk. Reviews: The Simpsons Game (Xbox 360) (Ryan), Dynasty Warriors: Gundam (Xbox 360) (Rab, feat. Ryan). Quick Review: TimeShift (PS3). Sketches: Hunter and Rayorg episode 2: Rab and Ryan descend to Earth, VideoGaiden Worldwide Videogaming News (Damien Murray's Top One: High School Musical, Gerry McLaughlin in England, failed link to the US, Anna McMenamin in Tokyo), Blanche and Clarissa's gif exhibition. Notes: The backdrop of the closing sketch is a still from series 2 of videoGaiden. First appearance of Gerry McLaughlin in videoGaiden. Damien Murray had previously appeared in the very first episode of Consolevania.
15	3	"Holidays"	14 December 2007	13'05"
Overview: Rab and Ryan go on holiday. Reviews: Guitar Hero III (Xbox 360) (Rab), Ace Combat 6: Fires of Liberation (Xbox 360) (Ryan). Quick Review: Unreal Tournament 3 (console). Sketches: The Achievement Brothers, videoGaiden Worldwide News (featuring Damien Murray's Top 3 (3. Nintendogs, 2. High School Musical, 1. Brain Age), England correspondent Gerry McLaughlin, a failed link-up to the USA, and Anna McMenamin in Tokyo), Hunter and Rayorg episode 3: Rab's head comes off, Happy Birthday Commodore 64. Notes: First episode to feature theme and incidental music from Luke Elliott.
16	4	"Comedy"	21 December 2007	12'42"
Overview: Stand up comedy night. Reviews: Silent Hill: Origins (PSP) (Rab), Sight Training (DS) (Ryan). Quick Review: BlackSite: Area 51 (Xbox 360). Sketches: Pirate computer games in EastEnders, videoGaiden Worldwide Gaming News (featuring Damien Murray's Top 1: Call of Duty 4 (all formats), England correspondent Gerry McLaughlin, US correspondents Tim & Eric, and Anna McMenamin in Tokyo), Hunter and Rayorg episode 4: looking for new people to fight, Video Game School. Notes: First appearance of the animated characters Hunter and Rayorg. First guest appearances by Tim Heidecker and Eric Wareheim.
18	5	"Graphics"	4 January 2008	16'01"
Overview: The boys want more graphics in the show. Reviews: Kane & Lynch (Xbox 360 / PS3) (Rab), Mario & Sonic at the Olympic Games (Wii) (Ryan). Quick Review: Bladestorm: The Hundred Years' War (Xbox 360). Sketches: Faces people make playing video games, videoGaiden Worldwide News (featuring Damien Murray's top 2007 titles (3. Halo 3, 2. Nintendogs, 1. Brain Age, England correspondent Gerry McLaughlin, US correspondents Tim & Eric, and Anna McMenamin in Tokyo), Hunter and Rayorg episode 5: Rab and Ryan see the abyss, the Doctor reads Zap magazine in 1986.
19	6	"Lust"	11 January 2008	11'50"
Overview: Ryan falls in love. Reviews: Lego Star Wars: The Complete Saga (Xbox 360 / PS3 / Wii) (Ryan), Call of Duty 4: Modern Warfare (Xbox 360 / PS3) (Rab). Quick Review: EA Playground (Wii). Sketches: Zack Eastwood: dating, Damien Murray's Top One: Guitar Hero III (all formats), Hunter and Rayorg episode 6: sniping.
20	7	"Convention"	18 January 2008	13'47"
Overview: The boys announce GaidenCon. Reviews: Link's Crossbow Training (Wii) (Ryan), Resident Evil: The Umbrella Chronicles (Wii) (Rab). Quick Review: Sam & Max: Maoi Better Blues, Omega Five (Xbox Live). Sketches: Gerry pitches new ideas, Damien Murray's Top One: Mario & Sonic at the Olympic Games (Wii), Gerry's Helmet with Peter Molyneux, Hunter and Rayorg episode 7: waiting for the respawn.
21	8	"Critique"	25 January 2008	13'39"
Overview: The episode reviews itself (reviewing itself (reviewing itself)). Reviews: Alan Hansen's Sports Challenge (Wii) (Rab, with Ryan), Naruto: Rise of a Ninja (Xbox 360) (Ryan). Quick Review: Undertow (Xbox Live), Guild Wars: Eye of the North. Sketches: Damien Murray's Top One: Burnout Paradise (all formats), Gerry Wogan: interviewing 'Jade Raymond' (Florence), Hunter and Rayorg episode 8: police interview.
22	9	"Continuity"	1 February 2008	15'47"
Overview: The boys edit the show themselves. Reviews: Tabula Rasa part one (Rab), Kingdom Under Fire: Circle of Doom (Xbox 360) (Ryan). Quick Review: Rez HD (Xbox Live) (two segments). Sketches: Zack Eastwood: gaming vs. real life, Damien Murray's Top One: Pro Evo 2008, Gerry's Joke Free Zone, Hunter and Rayorg episode 9: Dracula's plan.
23	10	"Censorship"	8 February 2008	12'13"
Overview: Rab is furious about being censored in the previous episode. Reviews: Zack & Wiki: Quest for Barbaros' Treasure (Wii) (Ryan), Tabula Rasa part two (Rab). Quick Review: Burnout Paradise, Codename: Panzers – Cold War press kit. Sketches: Damien Murray's Top One: Devil May Cry 4 (Xbox 360), Hunter and Rayorg episode 10: Dracula dispatches his minions.
24	11	"radioGaiden"	15 February 2008	13'55"
Overview: videoGaiden takes to the radio. Reviews: The Club (Rab), PDC World Championship Darts 2008 (Ryan). Quick Review: Mario & Sonic at the Olympic Games (DS), Dragoneer's Aria (PSP). Sketches: Damien Murray's Top One: Devil May Cry 4, Gerry Antics, Hunter and Rayorg episode 11: in the cells.
25	12	"Celebration"	22 February 2008	16'21"
Overview: The boys celebrate the end of the series. Reviews: Devil May Cry 4 (Xbox 360) (Ryan), Dynasty Warriors 6 (Rab). Quick Review: Castlevania: The Dracula X Chronicles, A-Train HX. Sketches: Zack Eastwood: smell good, Damien Murray's Top One: Mario & Sonic at the Olympic Games (Wii), VideoGaiden Worldwide News (US correspondents Tim & Eric, England correspondent Gerry McLaughlin), Hunter and Rayorg episode 12: on the run. Notes: A-Train HX receives a full review in episode 3.18. Gerry's deranged anger at the return of the Worldwide News leads into the events of the last six episodes.
26	13	"Convalescence"	29 February 2008	16'13"
Overview: Rab and Ryan are brutalised by Gerry but attempt to carry on regardless. Reviews: Dark Messiah of Might and Magic: Elements (Xbox 360) (Ryan), Samurai Warriors: Katana (Wii) (Rab). Quick Review: Sonic Riders: Zero Gravity (Wii), Ghost Squad. Sketches: Worldwide News with Tim & Eric and Gerry McLaughlin, Damien Murray's Top One: Unreal Tournament 3 (PS3), It's Gerry's show, Hunter and Rayorg episode 13: fighting the undead hordes.
28	14	"Celebrity"	7 March 2008	15'07"
Overview: The boys attempt to arrange a celebrity appearance in the show. Reviews: Lost Odyssey (Rab), Battalion Wars 2 (Wii) (Ryan). Quick Review: Uncharted: Drake's Fortune (PS3), Imperium Romanum (PC). Sketches: Damien Murray's Top One: Lost (Xbox 360), Hunter and Rayorg episode 14: rescue, Gerry's show. Notes: This episode is dedicated to Gary Gygax.
29	15	"Conflict"	14 March 2008	13'44"
Overview: The boys have had a falling-out. Reviews: Frontlines: Fuel of War (Rab), Army of Two (PS3) (Ryan). Quick Review: Persona 3, Mondo Agency. Sketches: Hunter and Rayorg episode 15: Madison Square Garden, Damien Murray's Top One: Army of Two (Xbox 360). Notes: Persona 3 receives a full review in episode 3.17.
30	16	"Ca$h"	21 March 2008	14'11"
Overview: The boys are made an offer they can't refuse, but is it on the level? Reviews: Lost (Rab), Fishing Master (Wii) (Ryan). Quick Review: Doom (Xbox Live), God of War: Chains of Olympus (PSP). Sketches: Damien Murray's Bottom One: The Spiderwick Chronicles (all formats), Zack Eastwood: go for a drive, Hunter and Rayorg episode 16: the stats.
31	17	"Captive"	28 March 2008	14'17"
Overview: Gerry has captured the boys. Will they get out of this alive? Reviews: Bully: Scholarship Edition (Xbox 360) (Ryan), Persona 3 (Rab). Quick Review: Space Invaders Extreme, Beautiful Katamari. Sketches: Zack Eastwood: Call of Duty 4, Damien Murray's Top One: Rainbow Six Vegas 2, Hunter and Rayorg episode 17: the fight.
33	18	"closeDown"	4 April 2008	16'35"
Overview: The boys don't attend the vG wrap party, but Zack, Gerry, Damien, Dominik Diamond, Gavin Mitchell, Emily Booth, and Frank Sidebottom do. Reviews: A-Train HX (Ryan), Condemned 2 (Xbox 360) (Rab). Quick Review: Turning Point: Fall of Liberty, Viking: Battle for Asgard. Sketches: Zack Eastwood: graphics, Damien Murray's Top One: Command & Conquer 3: Kane's Wrath (PC), Hunter and Rayorg episode 18: deus ex machina. Notes: A-Train HX was briefly reviewed in episode 3.12.

==== Series Three TV Specials ====
No. overall	No. in series	Title	Original release date	Length
17	N–A	"The videoGaiden Show Christmas Special"	23 December 2007	29'17"
Reviews: Mass Effect (Xbox 360) (Ryan with Randolph the Reindeer and the Wise Old Snowman), Need for Speed: ProStreet (Xbox 360) (Rab), Halo 3 (Xbox 360) (Dominik Diamond's Christmas story). The Christmas Wishlist: The Orange Box, Guild Wars: Eye of the North, Super Mario Galaxy, EDF. Sketches: Ryan's nightmares, Rab and Ryan's pranks, Rab and Ryan's first ever show, interview with Dominik Diamond, how to wrap presents, a performance of "Christmas is Really Fantastic" by Frank Sidebottom, the mystery guest, Rab's magic trick, Dracula's gift (guest starring Charles Martinet), the cast sings Good King Wenceslas. Notes: Dracula is played by Iain Connell. The creative team's habit of misspelling of 'exclusive' as 'exculsive' originated in the Halo 3 review.
27	N–A	"The February Christmas Special in March"	2 March 2008	29'21"
Overview: A retro special, presented in the styles of earlier programmes: GamesMaster, Micro Live, and Bits. Reviews: GamesMaster style: Super Metroid (Rab) and Beneath a Steel Sky (Ryan), Micro Live style: Tron (Rab) and Joust (Ryan), Bits style: Ico (Ryan) and Silent Hill 2 (Rab). Notes: The GamesMaster segment alludes to an incident on that programme in which Dave Perry stormed off the set after losing a gaming challenge. The Bits segment features an appearance from actual Bits co-presenter Emily Booth. Professor Healy is played by Gavin Mitchell, who played the Gaiden Man in series 2.
32	N–A	"The videoGaiden Awards 2008"	30 March 2008	29'28"
Overview: The boys, Gavin, Gerry, and the series' guest stars present the 2008 awards in their usual professional fashion. Hopefully it can be fixed in the edit. vG Awards: Best Storytelling: Portal, Best Mobile Game: Might and Magic Mobile II, Best Online Multiplayer Game: Guild Wars: Eye of the North, Most Fantastic Music: Portal, Rise of the Robot award (for laziest game): Manhunt 2, Best Visuals: Ōkami, Special Gameplay Award: God Hand, videoGaiden Time Capsule 2008 (Populous (video game), Amiga Power, Space Hulk, the Dreamcast), Game of the Year Award: Super Mario Galaxy. Features: Rab Florence on... storytelling (feat. Louise Stewart and Richard Rankin), Ryan Macleod on... hype. Notes: This show features an acoustic performance of Still Alive by composer Jonathan Coulton.

=== Series Four (2016) ===
Episodes were released simultaneously on the BBC iPlayer and on BBC Scotland's YouTube channel. The TV Special was broadcast on BBC2 Scotland.

No. overall	No. in series	Title	Original release date	Length
34	1	"Episode One"	3 March 2016	18'39"
Overview: Rab and Ryan find themselves trapped in an existential prison while their hyperactive doppelgangers cavort outside. Reviews: Nobunaga’s Ambition: Sphere of Influence (Rab), The Talos Principle (Ryan). Games We Didn't Review: Tom Clancy's Rainbow Six Siege. Independent Thoughts: To the Moon. Florence's Board Game Selection: City of Horror. Top 100: Dark Souls (Ryan) and Bloodborne (Rab). Notes: The credits roll over the Steptoe and Son theme ('Old Ned').
35	2	"Episode Two"	10 March 2016	20'13"
Overview: Rab and Ryan attempt to escape the existential prison. Reviews: XCOM 2 (Ryan), The Witness (Rab). Florence's Board Game Selection: Cosmic Encounter. Independent Thoughts: Gone Home. Games We Didn't Review: Dying Light. Top 100: Splatoon (Rab) and System Shock 2 (Ryan). Notes: The credits roll over the Some Mothers Do 'Ave 'Em theme.
36	3	"Episode Three"	17 March 2016	17'07"
Overview: Rab and Ryan discover that they are still subject to an editorial remit. Reviews: Firewatch (Rab), Street Fighter V (Ryan). Games We Didn't Review: Until Dawn. Independent Thoughts: Journey. Florence's Board Game Selection: Coup. Top 100: Hotline Miami (Ryan) and Bayonetta (Rab). Notes: The credits roll over the Bergerac theme.
37	4	"Episode Four"	24 March 2016	18'47"
Overview: Rab and Ryan receive a transmission from outside, but their hopes of rescue are swiftly dashed. Reviews: Hitman (Rab), That Dragon, Cancer (Ryan, with Rab). Games We Didn't Review: Life Is Strange. Independent Thoughts: Undertale. Florence's Board Game Selection: Theseus: The Dark Orbit. Top 100: Pong (Ryan) and NieR (Rab). Notes: Gerry McLaughlin guest stars in this episode. Florence previously reviewed Theseus: The Dark Orbit in his board game column on gaming website Rock, Paper, Shotgun. The credits roll over the Flumps theme.
38	5	"Episode Five"	31 March 2016	17'31"
Overview: Rab and Ryan's lives are in danger from Gerry - and themselves. Reviews: Superhot (Rab), The Guest (Ryan). Games We Didn't Review: Super Mario Maker (Wii U). Independent Thoughts: Shovel Knight. Florence's Board Game Selection: Thunder Road. Top 100: Sensible Soccer (Ryan) and Morrowind (Rab). Notes: Gerry McLaughlin guest stars in this episode. The credits roll over the 'Allo 'Allo! theme.
39	6	"Episode Six"	7 April 2016	16'55"
Overview: As one existential crisis concludes, another takes its place. Reviews: Quantum Break (Ryan), Story of Seasons and Return to PopoloCrois: A Story of Seasons Fairytale (Rab). Games We Didn't Review: Tom Clancy's The Division. Independent Thoughts: The Stanley Parable. Florence's Board Game Selection: Sherlock Holmes: Consulting Detective. Top 100: BioShock Infinite (Rab) and Tetris (Ryan). Notes: The credits roll over the Airwolf theme (on the iPlayer) and the videoGaiden series 3 theme (on YouTube).

==== Series Four TV Special ====
No. overall	No. in series	Title	Original release date	Length
40	N–A	"The TV Special"	14 April 2016	28'56"
Overview: Rab and Ryan investigate the future of gaming. Featuring interviews with games designer and producer Ian Livingstone, gaming design academic Dr Romana Ramzan, and YouTube commentator Stampy. Review: Eve: Valkyrie (Ryan, with Rab). Macleod's Story Selections: The Last of Us, Chrono Trigger, Dark Souls. Florence's Board Game Selection: Star Wars: Rebellion (feat. Richard Rankin). Notes: The Story Selections segment features a guest appearance from Owen O'Donnell, creator of the YouTube channel MechaGamezilla, who collaborated with Macleod on online game review show ChuckieDregs.
