= Vladimir McTavish =

Scottish comedian (1955/1956–2026)

- Born: Paul Sneddon; 1955 or 1956
- Died: 1 July 2026 (aged 70)
- Other name: Bob Doolally
- Spouse: Christine
- Children: 2

Paul Sneddon (1955 or 1956 – 1 July 2026), commonly known by his stage name Vladimir McTavish, was a Scottish stand-up comedian, columnist and actor. He featured in a number of television comedy programmes but was best known for his stand-up comedy, which included a character called Bob Doolally, a retired football manager turned alcoholic pundit.

== Career ==
His stand-up career started with shows he promoted himself, the first being in Newcastle-upon-Tyne. In 1994, he won the Strathmore Water Comedy Award; however, he did not receive the trophy until 2020. In 2015, he won the Scottish Comedy Awards Best Fringe Show, was nominated for a Comedy Award at Fringe World, Perth, Australia, and was a former BAFTA nominee. He featured on BBC Scotland's Comedy Underground, Gary: Tank Commander and Scot Squad, and also appeared on Frankie Boyle's Tramadol Nights and the BBC's Live Floor Show. He was a director of The Stand Comedy Club, which has venues in Glasgow, Edinburgh and Newcastle-upon-Tyne. He was awarded the Scottish Comedy Award Lifetime Achievement Award in 2019. He performed sell-out shows at the 2023 Edinburgh Fringe ("The End of the Beginning of the End") and repeated this in 2025 with a show called "The Last Chance Saloon".

== Personal life and death ==
McTavish was married to Christine and had two daughters, Julia and Rosie. In a 2019 interview, McTavish said that he met his wife after doing a short comedy spot in an Edinburgh pub:

... a woman in the audience approached me and said: "I really enjoyed that. When you went on, I thought you were going to be shit." We are now married, and 22 years later, we are still together.

McTavish was diagnosed with cancer in 2026 and underwent chemotherapy. He died suddenly on 1 July 2026, aged 70. He had been due to perform at the Edinburgh Fringe in August 2026 with a show reflecting on his cancer treatment. The Stand Comedy Club announced his death in Glasgow and said he was "a much treasured and loved" part of the Scottish comedy circuit, stating "He made every green room brighter, every line-up funnier and the world a nicer place to live in." Comedians including Frankie Boyle, Tom Stade, Susan Calman, Greg McHugh and Phil Ellis paid tribute to him after his death.

On 15 July 2026, The Stand Comedy Club, in partnership with The List and The Comedy Unit, announced the McTavish Award established in Sneddon's memory, to be presented at The List Festival Awards during Edinburgh Fringe season and intended to "celebrate the talent and creativity of the Scottish comedy scene".
