= Richard Rankin =

Scottish actor (born 1983)

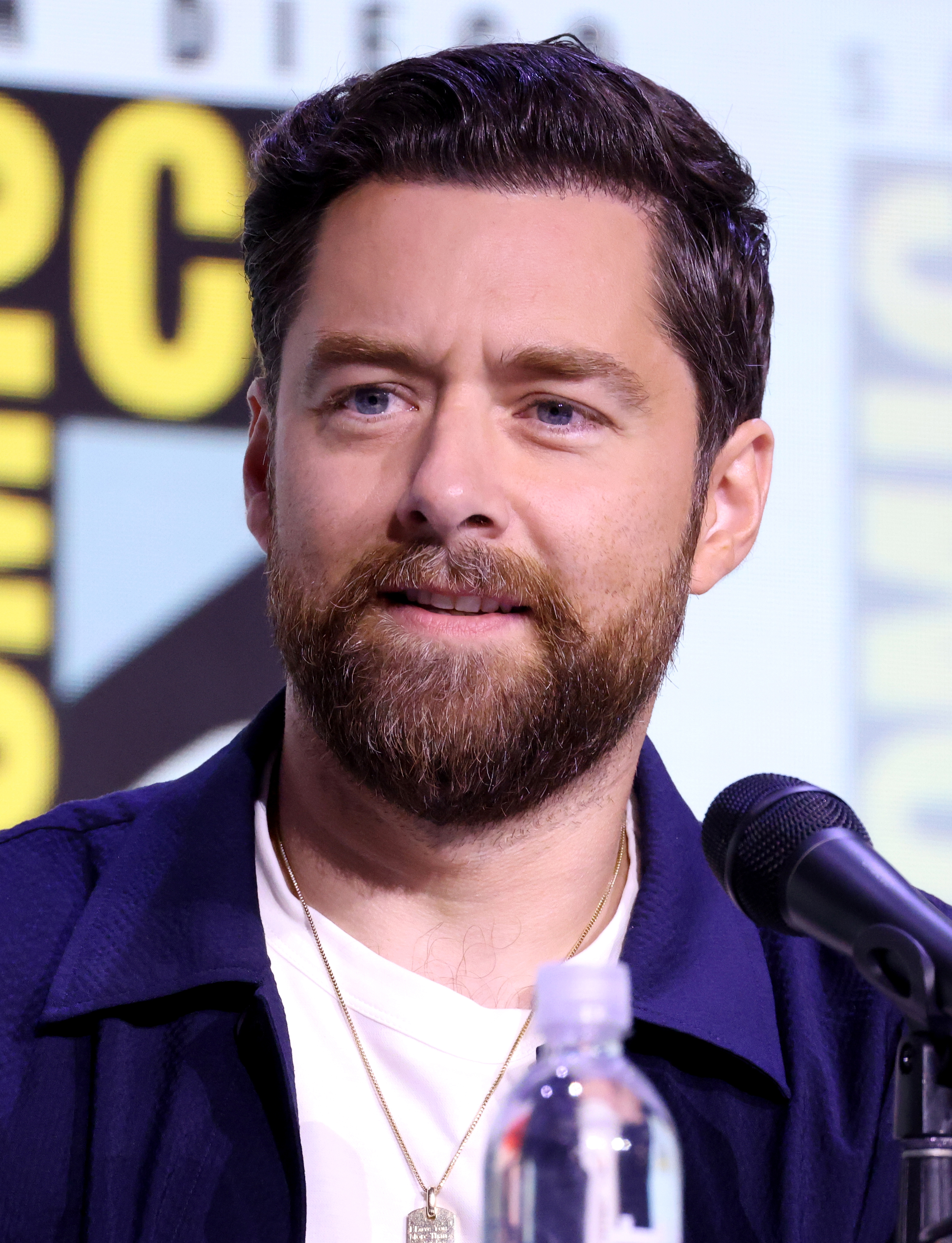
- Rankin in 2025
- Born: Richard Harris; 4 January 1983 (age 43); Rutherglen, Lanarkshire, Scotland
- Education: Langside College
- Occupations: Actor, comedian, photographer, singer
- Years active: 2006–present
- Height: 6 ft 0 in (1.83 m)
- Spouse: Sammie Russell (m. 2025)
- Relatives: Colin Harris

Richard Rankin (born Richard Harris, 4 January 1983) is a Scottish actor. He is best known for the Scottish sketch show Burnistoun, for playing Roger Wakefield MacKenzie in the Starz drama Outlander and for portraying John Rebus in the BBC crime series Rebus, adapted from the Inspector Rebus novels by Ian Rankin.

== Early life and education ==
Rankin was born as Richard Harris on 4 January 1983 in Rutherglen, Scotland, and spent part of his childhood in the East End of Glasgow. He moved to King's Park when he was ten, eventually attending Stonelaw High School. One of four boys born to a father in the police force and a mother in the hotel industry, he originally planned a career in the sciences or Information Technology.

Rankin initially attended Glasgow Caledonian University studying IT as a main subject but changed course after a chance encounter at the Hollywood Roosevelt Hotel during a holiday in Los Angeles. A local film producer told the then 22-year-old that he had the look of an actor, and upon his return to Glasgow, Rankin auditioned for Langside College with his brother Colin Harris. Both graduated and went on to a career in acting, but when Rankin, who was then known by his birth name of Richard Harris, applied for his Equity card he began using his mother's maiden name (Rankin) to prevent confusion with Irish actor Richard Harris.

== Career ==
=== Television ===
Rankin began his professional career in 2006 by starring alongside Robert Florence in VideoGaiden, a Scottish video game show originally aired on BBC Two Scotland. Between 2007 and 2010 he made appearances on episodic Scottish television programs Legit (2007) and The Old Guys (2009) for the BBC and Taggart (2010) for STV. The Scottish sketch comedy series Burnistoun, which premiered in 2009 and ran for three series on BBC Two Scotland, featured Rankin in various roles.

Two years later Rankin was cast as lovelorn Army Captain Thomas Gillan, alongside Kevin Doyle and Oona Chaplin, in the WWI based mini-series The Crimson Field . The program aired on BBC One in April 2014, but only ran for one series. He joined the cast of BBC One's crime drama series Silent Witness in January 2015, starring as Detective Inspector Luke Nelson in series eighteen's two-part story "Falling Angels". The episode focused on a series of murders on the London Underground, the investigation of which brought up mysterious childhood memories of his father's murder. Rankin went on to guest star in two episodes of NBC's conspiracy thriller American Odyssey as corporate hit man Haney, though the series was cancelled after season one.

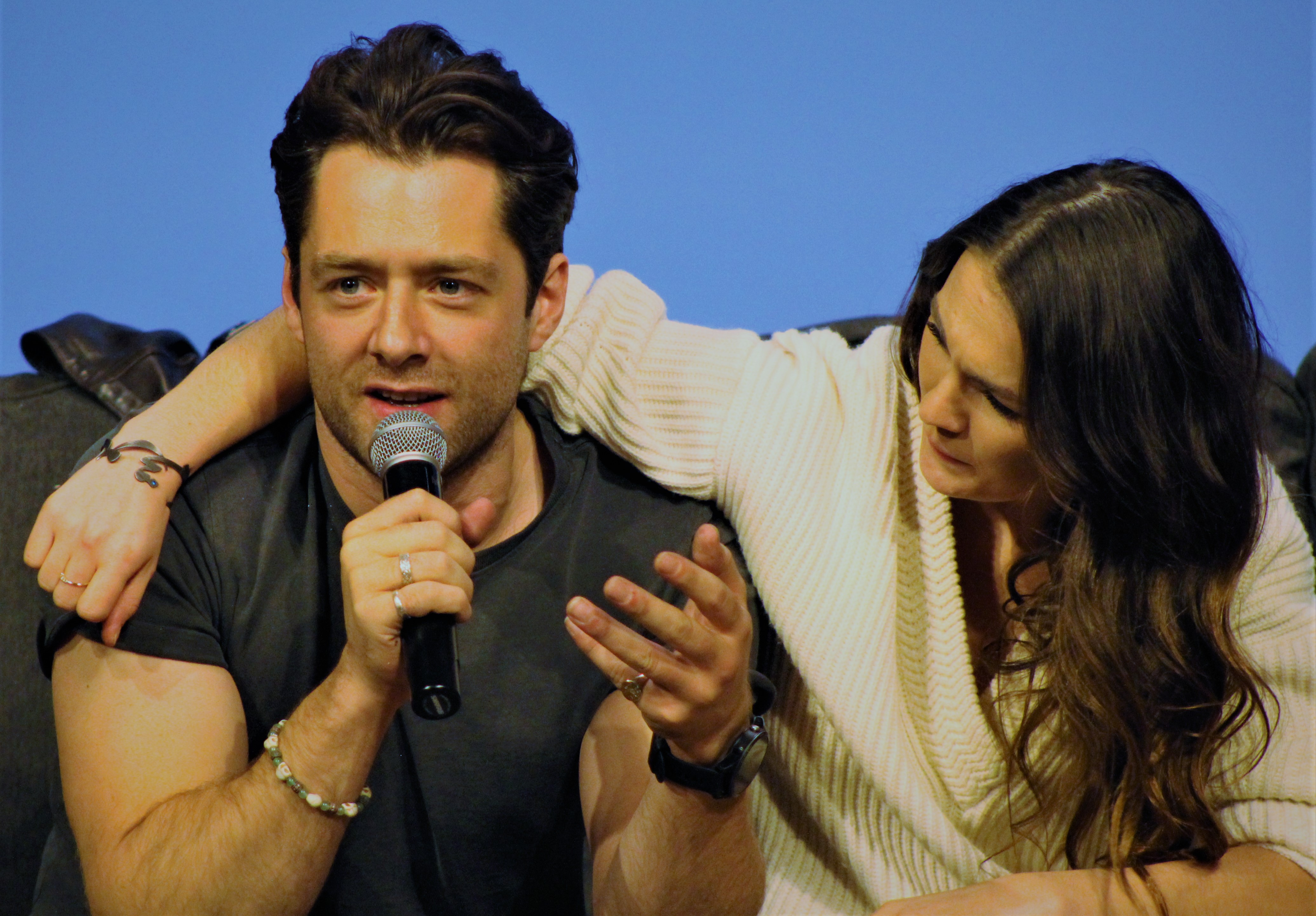
Richard Rankin (L) and Sophie Skelton (R) answer fan questions during a group panel at the Sasnak City Outlander convention on 18 November 2018.

Writer Kay Mellor tailored the role of Sean McGary for Rankin, changing the character from a Northerner to a Scot, in 2015's third series of her anthology drama The Syndicate. The series followed a group of colleagues who win the lottery, with Rankin portraying the gamekeeper of struggling English manor Hazelwood. That same year, BBC One's four part crime drama From Darkness saw Rankin portray Norrie Duncan, husband to Anne-Marie Duff's ex-Manchester cop Claire Church.

December 2015 brought the announcement that Rankin had been cast as adult Roger Wakefield in Starz's time-traveling drama series Outlander, which is based upon Diana Gabaldon's best-selling book series. Appearing first in the 2016 season two finale and then again in several episodes of season three, Rankin's character is the love interest of Brianna Fraser. He returned in seasons four and five, which premiered 4 November 2018 and 14 February 2020 respectively, with an expanded and recurring role in the series. Later in 2016, Rankin appeared as Detective Inspector Elliott Carne on the BBC's crime drama Thirteen. The series centered on Ivy Moxam (Jodie Comer), a young girl kidnapped and held for thirteen years, as she attempted to reconnect with the life she once had.

Rankin had roles in two BBC productions in 2017. First was the dramatic miniseries The Replacement, which revolved around Ellen (Morven Christie), who was dealing with maternity leave and the effects it was having on her career. Rankin played her psychiatrist husband in the three-part series. The second was a two-episode stint as Father Hrothweard in BBC Two's historical drama The Last Kingdom, which was based upon Bernard Cornwell's series of novels entitled The Saxon Stories.

Series twenty of ITV's long-running crime drama Midsomer Murders, which premiered in the United States in 2018 prior to its release in the UK, featured Rankin in episode four as rugby star Danny Wickham. In 2019 Rankin starred in series two of BBC One's drama Trust Me as neurologist Dr. Alex Kiernan. The second series, which began filming in Glasgow, Scotland in September 2018, featured a complete recasting from series one, with Rankin joining Alfred Enoch, Ashley Jensen, and John Hannah in the medical thriller.

In July 2020, Rankin starred in an episode of the National Theatre of Scotland/BBC Scotland's Scenes for Survival, a series of short theatrical productions that were filmed in quarantine, which was created in response to a worldwide outbreak of COVID-19. The episode, entitled The Longest Summer, features Rankin as a man remembering his childhood summers and includes a title song written by Noisemaker and performed by Rankin. The song was later released as a single to raise funds for the Scenes for Survival Hardship Fund, which assists artists hardest hit by the pandemic.

In June 2025, Rankin was reported to have joined the cast of the second series of The Forsytes, an adaptation of John Galsworthy's The Forsyte Saga.

In 2023 it was revealed that Rankin had been cast in the lead role of Detective Sergeant John Rebus, in a rebooted series based on the crime novels of author Ian Rankin, called Rebus. A second series was officially confirmed by the BBC in July 2025.

=== Film ===
Rankin starred in his first film role with 2011's short Dead Ringer, directed by Carter Ferguson. Conceived, written, and filmed in a forty-eight hour period, the film won several awards, including Best Director and Best Actor for Rankin, at the Glasgow 48 Hour Film Project. He would go on to star in an ultra low-budget horror film, House of Him, which was released during the Glasgow Film Festival, in February 2014. The film had a budget of approximately £900 and starred many of his Burnistoun colleagues, including Kirsty Strain and Louise Stewart. The next year Rankin was cast in John Well's film Burnt, alongside Bradley Cooper. Returning to short films in 2016, Rankin starred as Vance in Chloë Wicks' The Wyrd, the story of a young couple in seventh century pagan England dealing with the introduction of Christianity. It was announced in 2021 that Rankin would star in the short film Hello, Muscles, alongside Game of Thrones alumna Kate Dickie, as part of a campaign to raise awareness for young carers (caregivers).

=== Theatre ===
In 2008, while still in school at Langside College, Rankin portrayed Bothwell in Liz Lochhead's play Mary Queen of Scots Got Her Head Chopped Off at the Citizen's Theatre in Glasgow, Scotland. The next year he was cast, opposite his brother Colin Harris, in the dark comedy The Pillowman for XLC Productions. The production, which originally ran in March 2009, was invited to return to the Citizen's Theatre for a second run in September of that year. 2010 saw Rankin star as Donny in Martin McDonagh's Irish paramilitary play The Lieutenant of Inishmore before joining the National Theatre of Scotland's production of Gregory Burke's military play Black Watch. The play chronicled the experiences of members of Scotland's senior infantry regiment during the war in Iraq and was the first from National Theatre of Scotland to tour internationally, performing in locations such as Belfast, New York City, Washington D.C., and San Francisco.

Over the next two years Rankin would work with the Traverse Theatre, first in David Harrower's short play Good With People, which was performed at the Edinburgh Fringe Festival (2012), and then in Irish playwright David Ireland's comedy Most Favoured (2013). In 2014 he would headline in Kieran Hurley's play Bruises, part of the Royal Court Theatre's Unusual Unions series, as one of two brothers with diametrically opposing views meeting after a long absence. In late 2021 Rankin returned to the stage, at London's Almeida Theatre, in award winning director Yaël Farber's production of Shakespeare's The Tragedy of Macbeth. He was nominated for a WhatsOnStage Award in the category of Best Supporting Performer in a Male Identifying Role for his turn as Ross in the production.

=== Radio ===
Rankin appeared as Jack in BBC Radio Scotland's four-part Saddled in early 2019, a comedy which revolved around the adventures of The Easy Rider Cycling Club's members.

=== Podcast ===
Summer 2021 saw production Company The Big Light, in collaboration with musical theatre partner Noisemaker, produce an eight-part musical podcast entitled "Atlantic: A Scottish Tale". The series focused on the final settlers of the remote Scottish island St. Kilda, with Rankin featuring as Sloane Sinclaire.

== Personal life ==
On 10 July 2025, Rankin married Sammie Russell in a ceremony held at Hopetoun House, South Queensferry, attended by several of his fellow cast members from Outlander, including Caitriona Balfe and Sam Heughan. Also among the attendees was Jamie Roy, who portrays Brian Fraser in the prequel series Outlander: Blood of My Blood.

== Other activities ==
In addition to his acting credits, Rankin is an avid photographer. In March 2019 he hosted a one-night solo photography exhibition, entitled "His Mind’s Eye", at the Littlefield Gallery NYC in Brooklyn, New York.

== Filmography ==
=== Television ===
Year	Title	Character	Production	Notes
2006	VideoGaiden	Various	BBC	2 episodes
2007	Legit	Nelson	BBC One Scotland	Episode: "Danny, Champion of the World"
2009	The Old Guys	Groom	BBC	Episode: "Marriage"
2010	Taggart	Ged McShane	STV	Episode: "I.O.U"
2009-2012	Burnistoun	Various	BBC Two Scotland	Series regular, 19 episodes
2014	The Crimson Field	Captain Thomas Gillan	BBC One	Series regular, 6 episodes
2015	Silent Witness	D.I. Luke Nelson	BBC One	Episode: "Falling Angels" (2 parts)
2015	American Odyssey	Haney	NBC	2 episodes
2015	The Syndicate	Sean McGary	BBC One	6 episodes
2015	From Darkness	Norrie Duncan	BBC One	Series regular, 4 episodes
2016	Thirteen	D.I. Elliott Carne	BBC Three	Series regular, 5 episodes
2016–2026	Outlander	Roger Wakefield (MacKenzie)	Starz	Series regular (seasons 2–3), main role (seasons 4–8); 59 episodes
2017	The Replacement	Ian Rooney	BBC	Miniseries
2017	The Last Kingdom	Father Hrothweard	BBC Two	2 episodes
2018	Midsomer Murders	Danny Wickham	ITV	Episode: "The Lions of Causton"
2019	Trust Me	Dr. Alex Kiernan	BBC One	4 episodes
2020	Scenes For Survival	Man	BBC Scotland	Episode: "The Longest Summer"
2024-present	Rebus	DS John Rebus	Viaplay/BBC Scotland	Series lead (season 1-), 6 episodes
2026-present	The Forsytes	Sir Hugo Carteret	Channel 5/Masterpiece PBS	Series regular (series 2-3), 6 episodes
2026	Number 10 †		Channel 4	

=== Film ===
Year	Title	Character	Notes
2011	Dead Ringer	Richie	Short film/Independent
2014	The House of Him	Him	
2015	Burnt	Reece Waiter	
2016	The Wyrd	Vance	Screened at Norwich Film Festival
2022	Hello, Muscles		Short film

=== Theatre ===
Year	Title	Role	Director	Theatre
2008	Mary Queen of Scots Got Her Head Chopped Off	Bothwell	David Lee Michael	Citizens Theatre
2009	The Pillowman	Tupolski	David Lee-Michael	Citizens Theatre
2010	The Lieutenant of Inishmore	Donny	David Lee-Michael & David Winter	Citizens Theatre
2010- 2013	Black Watch	Granty	John Tiffany	National Theatre of Scotland
2012	Good With People	Evan	George Perrin	Traverse Theatre
2013	Most Favoured	Mike	Hamish Pirie	Traverse Theatre
2014	Unusual Unions: Bruises	Freddie	Caroline Steinbeis	Royal Court Theatre
2021	The Tragedy of Macbeth	Ross	Yaël Farber	Almeida Theatre

=== Radio ===
Year	Title	Character	Production	Director
2019	Saddled	Jack	BBC Radio Scotland	Gus Beattie (Producer)

=== Podcast ===
Year	Title	Character	Production	Director
2021	Atlantic: A Scottish Tale	Sloane Sinclaire	The Big Light, Noisemaker	Scott Gilmour

== Awards and nominations ==
Year	Award	Category	Nominated work	Result
2011	Glasgow 48 Hour Film Project	Best Actor	Dead Ringer	Won
2017	Satellite Awards	Best Ensemble (Television)	Outlander	Won
2021	Saturn Awards	Best Supporting Actor (Television)	Outlander	Nominated
2021	WhatsOnStage Awards	Best Supporting Performer in a Male Identifying Role	The Tragedy of Macbeth	Nominated
