= Gamezville =

- Genre: Entertainment
- Written by: Matt Cuttle; Matt Percival; Andrew Forgham; Simon Alveranga; Mo Ramzan; Guy Buckland
- Directed by: Jezz Wright; Matt Cuttle; Matt Percival; Andrew Forgham
- Presented by: Jamie Atiko; Darren Malcolm
- Starring: Matt Cuttle; Mo Ramzan; Sarah Rees; Guy Buckland; Simon Alveranga; Andrew Forgham
- Country of origin: United Kingdom
- Original language: English
- No. of series: 2
- No. of episodes: 192

Production
- Executive producers: Sally-Ann Howard; Jezz Wright; Viv Ellis
- Producers: Guy Buckland; Matt Percival; Matt Cuttle; Andrew Forgham; Debbie Hunt; Mo Ramzan; Simon Alveranga
- Running time: 60 minutes (inc. adverts)
- Production company: Shine TV

Original release
- Network: Sky One
- Release: 11 August 2003 – 12 September 2004

Gamezville is an entertainment video games show that was broadcast on Sky One and ran for two series from 11 August 2003 to 12 September 2004. It was presented by models Jamie Atiko and Darren Malcolm. The non-studio segments of the show were also shown in the United States between 2003 and 2004 on the digital cable channel Nickelodeon GAS as part of a Saturday night gaming block, under the show title Play 2Z. In this version, some segments were redubbed with an American voice.

== History ==
=== Conception ===
The first series was commissioned by Sky One, in the summer of 2003. The channel had been looking for a new videogaming series since the disappointment that was Blam!, an advertorial show for Gameplay.com, that aired in 2000. The production company that was selected was Shine Limited, which was set up by former BSkyB executive Elisabeth Murdoch after she quit as broadcaster.

As part of the unofficial terms of her severance package, Shine was promised several hundred hours of commissioned programming. Jezz Wright, who was then editor of the Lifestyle & Features department at Shine was tasked with coming up with a format that would produce multiple hours of output per week. The budget was challenging so it had to be a simple format whereby, to keep costs down, two or three could be recorded in a day. This would ensure the programme maintained a considerable profit margin from the production budget.

Gamezville aired five days a week from Monday to Friday at 4pm with a 9am morning repeat the following day. Jezz Wright, who came from a TV news background conceived Gamezville as a zoo type format whereby the production team would play as much a part on camera as they would off it. A 'newsroom' environment would be created that would serve as the off air production office and the on screen newsroom. Every day, the show would have a mix of reviews, news, features and characters, all encased in a heavily graffitied studio presented by real gamers in a rough 'n ready sense rather than the traditionally contrived 'kids TV' type presenting.

The show suffered from being a daily 60-minute production. With only a finite amount of news and reviews to cover each week, items and features were sometimes stretched and games that never really should have been featured that prominently had significant airtime. Although the strategy may have not pleased all videogaming fans who watched the show, the approach taken by the production meant that apart from keeping costs low the series showcased new talent and originated some innovative strands.

=== Cellcast complaint ===
"The Guru" segment of the show was previously titled "The Gamez Guru" in the first series. But due to a complaint from Cellcast who claimed it infringed on the copyright of their own long running gaming cheat TV show Game Guru, when the first series re-aired on Sky One in the early mornings, all "Guru" graphic sequences were replaced with the second series to keep in line with the new character. Even though mentions of it remain during the live-action sequences.

== Format ==
The show was filmed in a large set, with audience members on set and near the presenters in a manner similar to Top Gear. Jamie and Darren would introduce the various segments of the show, which would then be presented by another presenter.

Though shot in what looked like a studio, it was actually a TV studio sound stage setup. To avoid the costs of the former (especially the hire costs of a three camera setup, complete with broadcast cameramen and a vision mixer), the show was filmed with two cameras. A Sony DSR-500 as the primary, and the cheaper Sony PD-150 for cutaways. This made most of the studio segments (which represented over 80% of the show) very simple and cheap to cut together in post-production.

All of the on-screen G-Team were actually the show's production team.

== Show segments ==
=== Face Off ===
The show would start with the first part of the Face Off segment, where a multiplayer game is used to settle a dispute between two members of the public, or, in the second series, celebrities. This takes the form of a best of three match between the two guests, the winner of which then plays against one of the hosts. Each of these four matches would be in a different quarter of the show. When a player won by all the matches it was referred to as a White Wash.

=== "The Guru" ===
This portion of the show featured The Guru – supposedly filmed in the roof space above the studio (Series One) and then a disused lift shaft (Series Two). He would reply to requests for cheats or tips sent in by viewers, and was made to look like a mystic or a druid who claimed to have infinite knowledge. He was a comedy character who would often mock the viewers, calling them "Maggots" before giving out the cheats, and appearing to be constantly exasperated by the 'worthless' questions from viewers and the 'stupidity' of the two main presenters.

=== Reviews ===
Members of the audience would be found to be playing a game during the course of the show, and would be interviewed by a presenter to discuss the various good and bad points of the game and give it a rating out of five 'Gs' (first series). In the second series, the game was rated out of 10, though this time by a member of the show, with the audience member just voicing opinions.

== Reception ==
Reaction to the show was largely negative. The show received criticism for being out of touch with videogamers who were demographically much older on average than the teenagers the show was seemingly trying to appeal to. The fact that the weekly output was so high, combined with both series running for a combined total of 192 episodes, struck many that Sky One was not concerned with the content of the show or the reception it was receiving from viewers.

In a Jolt TV review of the series, it was stated, "Gamezville is appalling, and does no favours whatsoever to the games industry".

=== Response from video game TV presenters / producers ===
During an interview with GamesMaster Magazine about his new game show When Games Attack, Dominik Diamond declared that "Gamezville is the equivalent to eating your own shit, the producers must have thought 'Oh because we have black people in it must be street.'"

Johnny Ffinch, producer of GamesMaster, was also asked about his opinion on Gamezville during an interview, and expressed: "I have more respect for suicide bombers than I do for the people who are involved with Gamezville... it's all fucking 'Yo mate...' I mean these guys can't even speak fucking English!"

Comedian Robert Florence would go on to create the internet show Consolevania as a reaction to the programme, which would later become the BBC Scotland show videoGaiden.
