= Limmy's Other Stuff =

Scottish comedy show

- Created by: Brian Limond
- Written by: Brian Limond
- Directed by: Brian Limond
- Starring: Brian Limond
- Country of origin: Scotland
- Original languages: Scots; English
- No. of episodes: 1

Production
- Running time: 30 minutes
- Production company: The Comedy Unit

Original release
- Network: BBC Scotland
- Release: 2 October 2020

Limmy's Other Stuff is a Scottish surreal comedy sketch show broadcast on BBC Scotland, written, directed by and starring Brian "Limmy" Limond, in which he introduces a chronological compilation of his non-TV material, from his early pre-YouTube sketches, to his Vines, to his present day livestreaming.

Limmy has confirmed 'Limmy's Other Stuff' will be his last television project with his focus now becoming a full-time streamer on Twitch. Limmy who has previously spoken of his mental health struggles and suicidal impulses explained "doing the telly stuff has made me fucking suicidal. Each series, pretty much, made me suicidal".

== Reception ==
In a review for The Herald, Alison Rowat said "This half hour is a masterclass in the art of making something out of nothing." Limmy's Other Stuff was The Sunday Times Demand Pick of the Week for 18 October 2020.
