= Raymond Mearns =

Scottish actor

- Born: Raymond Patrick Mearns; 1967 (age 58–59); Glasgow
- Notable work: Legit; Ae Fond Kiss... It's a Free World... Home

Comedy career
- Years active: 1989–present
- Website: http://www.raymondmearns.com

Raymond Mearns (born 1967) is a Scottish actor and comedian from Glasgow’s East End who is best known for his part in Scottish comedy sitcom Legit, in which he played Happy Boab.

He was educated at St Andrew’s Secondary School and Glasgow Central College of Commerce and has a degree in Business.

Mearns made his acting debut alongside his brother Eddie when they played the blind twins Troy and Roy Pettifer in the 1998 short film Home, which won Best Short Film at the 1999 BAFTA Awards.

He has appeared in two films directed by Ken Loach - Ae Fond Kiss... and It's a Free World.... He also starred in Next Time Ned.

In December 2008, he appeared in the Rab C. Nesbitt Christmas special, in which he played a BBC security guard. He also featured prominently as a variety of characters in the Scottish-BAFTA winning comedy sketch series Limmy's Show.

In July 2023, a Pacific Crest Trail hiker claimed he was saved from a bear attack by the sound of Mearns' voice.

On 4 August 2023, he suffered a mini stroke and was forced to cancel all his shows at the Edinburgh Festival Fringe. Frankie Boyle was one of several comedians to perform at a benefit show to support Mearns. In March 2024, Mearns returned to the stage for the Glasgow International Comedy Festival, where he was nominated for the Sir Billy Connolly Spirit of Glasgow award.

In July 2024, he filmed scenes in Greenock for the crime comedy Sharp Instinct: Volume II.

== Works ==
=== TV shows ===
Year	Title	Role
2002	Live Floor Show	Guest Comedian
2006	Rebus - A Question of Blood	Scuzzy Hotel Manager
2007	Legit	Happy Boab
2008	Videogaiden	CCTV Operator
2008	Rab C. Nesbitt	BBC Security Guard
2010	Limmy's Show	Various
2010	One Night In Emergency	Pharmacist
2011	River City	Registrar

=== Movie ===
Year	Title	Role
1998	Home	Troy
2004	Ae Fond Kiss...	Big Roddie
2007	It's a Free World...	Andy
2009	Next Time Ned	Ned Randall
2020	Limbo	Mike
2024	Sharp Instinct: Volume II	David Wainwright

=== Web series ===
Year	Title	Role
2011	Ghost Of Raymond Mearns	The "Real" Raymond Mearns

=== Podcasts ===
Year	Title	Role
2024–present	Glesga Da Podcast	Co-host
