= Highway Pursuit =

2003 video game

- Developer: Adam Dawes/Retrospec
- Publisher: Adam Dawes/Retrospec
- Platform: Windows
- Release: 12 November 2003 (first version 1.0); 6 January 2005 (version 1.1); 13 November 2015 (version 1.2.3); 1 March 2025 (version 1.2.4)
- Genre: Racing game
- Mode: Single-player

Highway Pursuit is a computer game remake of the arcade game Spy Hunter created by British developer Adam Dawes in association with Retrospec, initially released in 2003. Highway Pursuit puts players in control of a powerful sports car, in a world filled with enemy agents, seeking to take control of the road. Their mission is to destroy as many of these enemy agents as possible, without putting any civilians at risk. Along the way, players will encounter varied terrain and weather conditions, a number of different enemy vehicles intent on their destruction, and also a few helpful pointers from their colleague Ashley, back at HQ.

== Development history and future ==
The initial version of the game was developed over an 18-month period from mid-2002 until its release date on 12 November 2003. A subsequent version, v1.1, was released on 6 January 2005 with a variety of small improvements to the controls and flow of the game. On 13 November 2015, game gained a new update to version 1.2.3, that contains many fixes & 1920x1080 resolution support. While the main game dynamic is based on the arcade game Spy Hunter, the design attempts to include new feature not included within the original game in order to add some originality. The main feature is the addition of voice communication from the player's base of operations, provided by a game character named Ashley. The inspiration for this was provided by another classic racing game, Chase HQ.

Gameplay

The author has stated that there are no current plans for a sequel.

== Cheats ==
The original game did not contain any cheat modes, although a number of players found ways to hack into the game and adjust its score and life counters. Strangely, a German web site, spieletipps.de, published a number of cheat codes for the game, none of which actually existed. After receiving numerous puzzled emails, the author decided to include the cheats into the second release of the game, adding several more at the same time.

== Media coverage ==
Highway Pursuit has appeared on the cover discs of a variety of computer magazines.

More notable appearances include:

- a mention on the April 2004 British edition of PC Gamer magazine (in which it was described as "A SpyHunter remake. It's better than the terrible update that the game received on the consoles. A simple left-right car-skidder makes for a playable and difficult game.").
- a review on the Sky One TV programme Gamezville on Sunday 22 August 2004.
- featured as cool site of the day on Kim Komando's web site on 27 June 2007.
