= Kirsty Strain =

Scottish actress

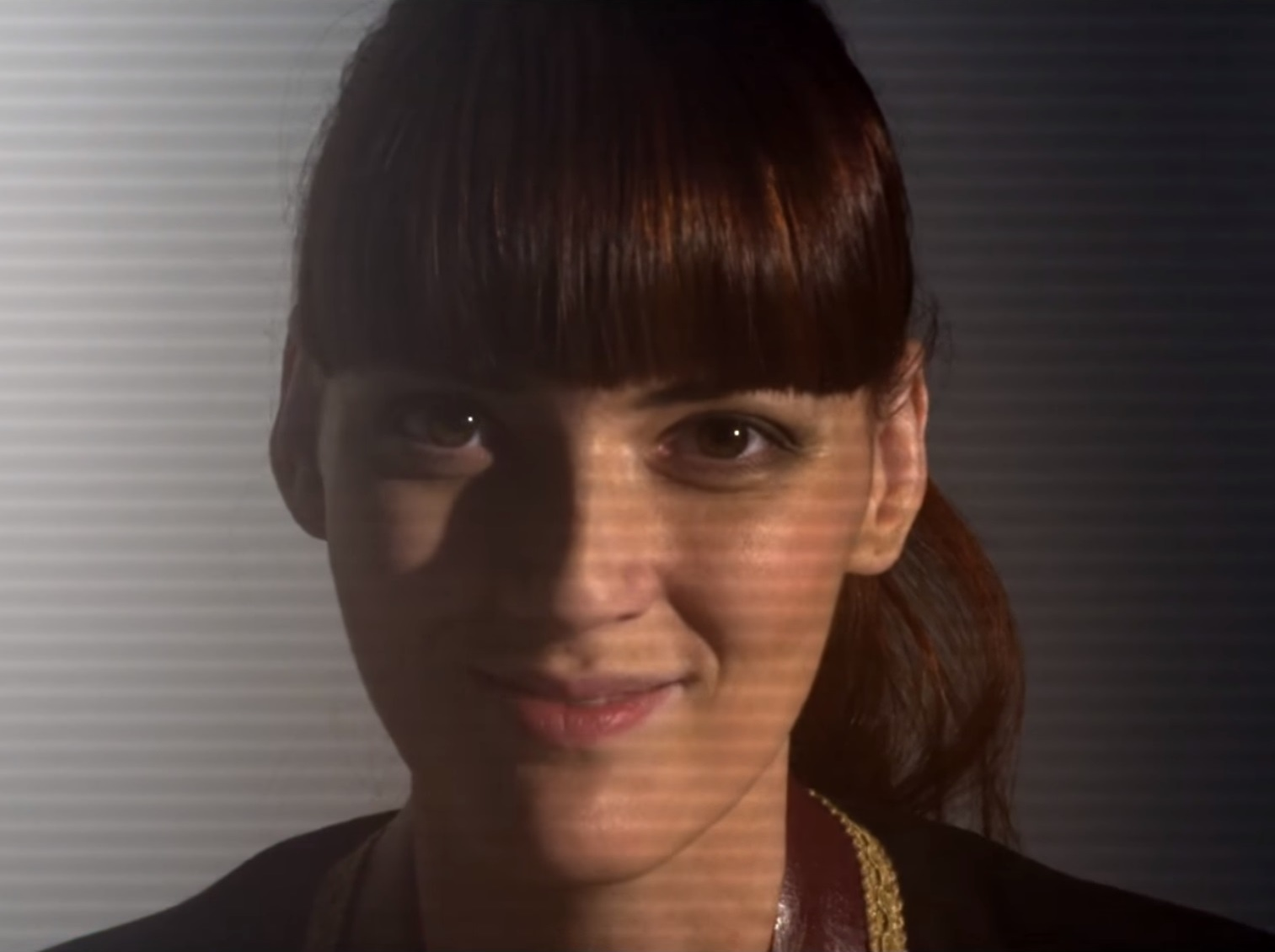
- Strain in the pilot episode of the Cops and Monsters web series, 2016
- Born: Kirsty Jean Mary Strain; Glasgow, Scotland
- Occupation: Actress
- Years active: 2000–present

Kirsty Strain is a Scottish actress, best known for her roles in the popular comedy sketch series, Burnistoun, and as Angie Warren in the BBC Scotland television series, River City. She can more recently be seen in Outlander and the feature films, And Violet and Anna and the Apocalypse.

== Education and early career ==
Kirsty Strain attended Bannerman High School in Glasgow before enrolling at Langside College in the same city to study acting and performance. She later went on to study at the Lee Strasberg Theatre and Film Institute in New York in 2005, training under Paul Calderón where fellow alumni in her year included Margherita Missoni and Norwegian actress Sofie Cappelen. She remained in New York for three years, during which time she performed at the school's Marilyn Monroe Theatre and at the Independent Theatre in downtown New York.

Her interest in theatre and performance began with her early childhood experience at the Scottish Youth Theatre (SYT) which included performing with fellow SYT alumnus Sean Biggerstaff in a production of Sleeping Beauty at the Tron Theatre in Glasgow. Further theatre performances with the organisation included The Glory on the main stage of the Citizens Theatre in Glasgow and at His Majesty's Theatre in Aberdeen. She also performed in their 2002 production of Illyria at the Macrobert Arts Centre.

== Career ==
Kirsty Strain's career began when she went on to work with the Scottish Youth Theatre's patrons, Blythe Duff and Colin McCredie in Taggart for STV in the role of Lisa Corrie in the programme's 99th episode, "So Long Baby" in 2009. This however, wasn't Kirsty's first television performance: That came in the form of the short film entitled, Rice, Paper, Stars in the roles of Ninja/Baby/Doll as part of the Tartan Shorts series for the BBC in 2000.

She worked on the feature film Up There. She appeared in the comedy sketch series Burnistoun for which she is a member of the principal cast, produced by The Comedy Unit. Strain has filmed three consecutive series, the third of which was televised in August 2012. She was a regular in the BBC One Scotland television series River City, in the recurring role of Angie Warren. She had a role in the BBC One drama, One of Us, and she most recently appeared in an episode of Outlander, which was televised in October 2017. Strain also worked on the feature film Anna and the Apocalypse, and appeared in a central role for the feature film And Violet, also in 2017.

== Charities ==
She is a campaigner for ME awareness and supports the charities TYMES Trust and Share A Star.

== Filmography ==
=== Film ===
Year	Title	Role	Notes
2008	All of Me	Rhona	
2010	When The Bough Breaks	Sarah	
2010	Best Before	Anna	
2010	Native Son	Dead Girl	
2011	Somebody's Daughter	Amy Scott	
2012	Up There	Cheryl	
2014	The House of Him	Sophie	
2014	The Weepers	Lady Maclean	
2014	I.Q You	Danielle	
2015	Dropping Off Michael	Roxy	
2017	And Violet	Zoe	
2017	Anna and the Apocalypse	Ms Wright	
2017	Echoes That Remain	Susan	Also Writer and Director

=== Television ===
Year	Title	Role(s)	Episode(s) & Notes
2000	Rice, Paper, Stars	Ninja/Baby/Doll	Television Short
2009	Taggart	Lisa Corrie	Episode 99, "So Long, Baby"
2009–2012	Burnistoun	Various	Television Series
2012	River City	Angie Warren	Television Series
2016	One of Us	Monica Grant	Television Series
2016	Burnistoun Goes To Work	Various	TV movie
2017	Outlander	Peggy	Television Series

=== Video Games ===
Year	Title	Role(s)	Episode(s) & Notes
2015	Bedlam	Athena	Main character
