= Tom Stade =

Canadian comedian

Tom Stade is a Canadian comedian who currently lives in Scotland. Stade was encouraged to move from his hometown of Vancouver to the UK in 2001 by his friend and fellow comedian, Craig Campbell. He has a distinctive "drunken Canadian" accent and is known for his appearances at the Edinburgh Festival, as well as appearing on British TV shows such as Live at the Apollo, The Comedy Store, The Live Floor Show, Stand Up for the Week, and The World Stands Up. Other appearances include: Mock the Week, the Birmingham leg of (whilst he lived in Wolverhampton) Michael McIntyre's Comedy Roadshow, Dave's One Night Stand, Lee Mack's All Star Cast, and Frankie Boyle's Tramadol Nights (for which he also wrote). In March 2011 and December 2012, he appeared as a guest star on Soccer AM.

Stade appeared on Frankie Boyle's stand-up show The Boyle Variety Performance in August 2012, and recorded a live DVD at the Bloomsbury Theatre, London (released in autumn 2013). His 2013 UK tour show was called Totally Rocks.

In October 2022 Stade appeared on the Triggernometry podcast.

In September 2024 Stade was awarded an honorary doctorate of arts by the University of Wolverhampton.

On November 13th 2025 Stade's long standing comedy partnership with Brian ( 63 ) from Belfast came to an end at a sold out show at the SSE Arena in Brian's home town. Brian, who was accompanied by his wife Caroline ( 65 and retired! ), had worked with Stade on many shows around the world including many memorable sold out shows in Melbourne. Brian is stepping away from showbusiness to concentrate on his new 'Swimming With Stingrays' business. Even though Brian left, Tom stayed.
