= Empty (TV series) =

- Genre: Sitcom
- Directed by: Colin Gilbert
- Starring: Gregor Fisher; Billy Boyd; Tom Urie
- Opening theme: "In the City" by The Jam
- Ending theme: "In the City" by The Jam
- Country of origin: Scotland
- Original language: English
- No. of series: 1
- No. of episodes: 6

Production
- Producers: Iain Davidson; The Comedy Unit
- Production location: Greater Glasgow
- Camera setup: Single-camera
- Running time: 30 minutes

Original release
- Network: BBC Two
- Release: 28 February – 3 April 2008

Empty is a six-episode BBC Two sitcom first broadcast on 28 February 2008. It stars Gregor Fisher and Billy Boyd as Jacky Allen and Tony MacBryan respectively, two men who work for the property maintenance company 'Greater Glasgow Building Services'.

== Situation and plot ==
Each episode mostly revolves around the dialogue of the two main characters as they discuss their lives (and unseen wives) and the things they find in the houses they clear. Jacky and Tony are also given to re-enacting silent comedy and music hall routines, and always take a polaroid photo of themselves which they date and hide in a crevice somewhere. The pair also like to guess what they will find behind each door before they open it. As befits their personalities, Jacky's guesses are usually amusing and fanciful, while Tony's are often gruesome, even macabre.

Although the main duo interact with various other characters over the course of the series, the only supporting character to appear in more than one episode is Barry, a plumber who dresses like Super Mario and is nicknamed "Super Barrio" by Jacky and Tony (though he has never heard of the character and doesn't understand the joke). Barry is played by Tom Urie.

The series is written by Robert Florence and Iain Connell, who wrote the series Burnistoun, Legit and sketches for Chewin' the Fat, also produced by BBC Scotland.

== Episode list ==
1. "Nobody knows what goes on behind closed doors" – Tony and Jacky clear a house in which they discover a room full of elegant hand-crafted models of sailing ships, and are shocked by the callous attitude of a woman to comes to "collect" one.
2. "Is is" – The duo clear a house in which they find a number of curious objects, including a dada mural and a motorcycle in the bath, prompting a competition to provide the best explanation of what had been going on in there. There is a cameo appearance by writer Iain Connell.
3. "Happiness" – Tony and Jacky do repairs at the home of an elderly woman and become concerned that her dementia may put her in danger, but cannot agree on whether to tell her son.
4. "Protection" – The pair are sent to clear a crime scene, but are surprised to find it has been taken over by squatters.
5. "Night Moves" – Tony and Jacky spend the night in the office, setting practical jokes on their new boss.
6. "Ghosties" – While carrying out repairs in an old theatre, Tony tries to persuade Jacky that they should leave the company and go into business together.

== Theme changes ==
The show signature theme by the Jam was changed for syndication, but when the show was uploaded to popular broadcasting platform Netflix it was noted to be a generic theme which merely sounded similar to the original, somewhat akin to how the Still Game main theme was changed to avoid royalties issues.
