= Over the Wall (band) =

Scottish band

Over The Wall
- Origin: Glasgow, Scotland
- Genres: Indie pop
- Years active: 2006–2014
- Label: Motive Sounds Recordings
- Past members: Ben Hillman; Gavin Prentice

Over The Wall was a pop-rock-folk band based in Glasgow, Scotland. The outfit consisted of multi-instrumentalists Ben Hillman and Gavin Prentice, a line-up which remained unaltered after its 2006 formation.

== Formation and musical style ==
Prentice and Hillman met in student halls as freshers at the University of Glasgow, and soon began running a regular music evening at the Stereo bar (now a vegetarian cafe called The 78), on Kelvinhaugh Street in the West End. Having initially performed individually at these events, the pair soon began collaborating as a duo and quickly found an idiosyncratic-yet-natural niche: euphoric, folk-tinged pop music. The name 'Over The Wall' was taken from a now-defunct fanzine of Prentice's favoured football team Albion Rovers.

Over The Wall's sound is influenced by a range of different artists and genres. Prentice told The Scotsman: "Ben and I first bonded over classic pop songwriting. Stuff like Elton John, Bruce Springsteen, early Tom Waits and The Beatles were the things that brought us together." Former Genesis frontman Peter Gabriel is also an inspiration to the pair. Prentice has also gone on record as saying the aim of the Over The Wall 'experience' is to induce "Euphoria, the same euphoria you get from a trance compilation or any given chart hit but hopefully presented in a more thoughtful package."

Lyrically, the band has traversed a diverse range of topics and themes, including getting older, finding one's place in the world, body image, and political history – often displaying chagrin at the influence of Margaret Thatcher's premiership. The song "Istanbul" explores the effect of the half-time team talk given by then Liverpool F.C. manager Rafael Benitez during the 2005 UEFA Champions League Final, while "The Crucible" is a fictional story about the wife of a philandering snooker player, set in Sheffield's Crucible Theatre.

== Early history ==
From the group's early days, praise and support came from broadcaster and DJ Vic Galloway, leading to frequent airplay on his BBC Radio 1 and BBC Radio Scotland shows. BBC Radio 6 Music presenters Steve Lamacq and Tom Robinson also gave regular exposure to the band's music, the latter hosting live sessions and interviews with the duo on his show.

In 2007 the group was selected from over 1,200 unsigned acts to perform at Scotland's largest music festival, T In The Park. In 2008 they beat off competition from 800 hopefuls to secure a slot at the End Of The Road Festival in Dorset, England. The band previously shared management with We Were Promised Jetpacks, with whom they also played numerous live shows.

== Album release ==
The band released their debut album Treacherous in the United Kingdom on 22 November 2010, on Motive Sounds Recordings. The album received positive reviews and fanfare, with This Is Fake DIY describing it as "...one of the more stunning albums of the year". The Skinny hailed the album's "...impressively imaginitive variety", awarding it a rating of four out of five.

Treacherous was supported with a video for the final track, live set-closing fans' favourite "Thurso". It was filmed, directed and produced by Red Design in Brighton during Over The Wall's 2009 nationwide tour.

In early 2011, the band embarked on another lengthy jaunt across the UK and Ireland. In mid-March, "Shifts" (the opening track from Treacherous) was featured in the finale of the fifth series of Skins on Channel 4 in the United Kingdom. Later that month, the second series of critically acclaimed BBC 1 Scotland comedy series Burnistoun aired with "Thurso" as its new theme tune.

Further television exposure came in January 2012, when the track "A Grand Defeat" (from The Rise and Fall of Over The Wall EP) was used in the Scottish Government's 'Let's Go Greener Together' television campaign to promote more environmentally-conscious behaviour in Scotland.

== Hiatus and other projects ==
2012 was spent mainly on hiatus. As Hillman focused on academic endeavours, Prentice recorded and released his first solo album The Invisible Hand through the Instinctive Racoon label, and ventured out on the road in a support slot on the Scottish tour of We Were Promised Jetpacks.

In early 2013 Prentice co-devised and performed in Rantin', a song-based storytelling production with writer/performers Kieran Hurley and Julia Taudevin, and fellow musician Drew Wright (a.k.a. Wounded Knee) for the National Theatre of Scotland. The well-received initial performances of the show were part of the Arches Behaviour Festival programme.

== Return and further releases ==
In March 2013 the band announced their long-awaited live comeback - a show at Glasgow's Òran Mór on 21 June.

Later in the year saw two releases, beginning with new track "Tell Her I Love Her" on a split single with fellow Glasgow band John Knox Sex Club in October. Hot on the heels of this came the unleashing of This Is How We Did It in physical and digital forms, an EP which included live staple "Radiator".

On 28 February 2014, a Facebook post confirmed the news that Over The Wall would disband following two final live shows in May 2014. Prentice has subsequently released music with his new outfit ULTRAS, with whom he continues to tour and record.

== Discography ==
=== EPs ===
- The Rise and Fall of Over The Wall (November 2008)
- This Is How We Did It (December 2013)

=== Albums ===
- Treacherous (November 2010)
