= The Replacement (TV series) =

- Genre: Drama
- Written by: Joe Ahearne
- Directed by: Joe Ahearne
- Starring: Morven Christie; Vicky McClure; Richard Rankin; Dougray Scott; Neve McIntosh; Navin Chowdhry; Siobhan Redmond
- Composer: Dan Jones
- Country of origin: United Kingdom
- Original language: English
- No. of series: 1
- No. of episodes: 3

Production
- Executive producers: Andy Harries; Suzanne Mackie; Matthew Read
- Producer: Nicole Cauverien
- Production location: Glasgow, Scotland
- Cinematography: Nick Dance
- Running time: 58 minutes
- Production companies: BBC; Left Bank Pictures

Original release
- Network: BBC One
- Release: 28 February – 14 March 2017

The Replacement is a British three-part television drama. It began airing on BBC One on 28 February 2017. The three-part serial was filmed and set in Glasgow.

== Plot ==
Ellen, an architect, is expecting her first child. Her firm decide to bring in maternity cover. Ellen is impressed by Paula, who had taken a career break to look after her daughter, but now wants to return to work. Initially Ellen and Paula get on, but Ellen begins to fear Paula is taking over her professional and personal life.

== Cast ==
- Morven Christie as Ellen Rooney, a successful architect who gets pregnant while working on a big project
- Vicky McClure as Paula Reece, an architect prodigy looking to return to work after raising her daughter
- Richard Rankin as Ian Rooney, Ellen's psychiatrist husband whom she met after becoming his patient
- Dougray Scott as David Warnock, manager of Ellen's firm. He is married to Kay yet harbours feelings for Ellen
- Neve McIntosh as Kay Gillies, an award-winning career-minded architect and friend to Ellen
- Navin Chowdhry as Kieran, Paula's husband and confidant

== Episodes ==
Title	Directed by	Written by	Original release date	UK viewers (millions)
"Episode 1"	Joe Ahearne	Joe Ahearne	28 February 2017	8.50
"Episode 2"	Joe Ahearne	Joe Ahearne	7 March 2017	8.16
"Episode 3"	Joe Ahearne	Joe Ahearne	14 March 2017	8.43
