= Burnistoun =

British TV sketch show (2009–2019)

- Genre: Sketch show
- Directed by: Iain Davidson
- Starring: Robert Florence; Iain Connell; Louise Stewart; Kirsty Strain; Allan Miller; Richard Rankin; David Allan; Gerry McLaughlin
- Theme music composer: John Mark Williams (Series 1), Over the Wall (Series 2)
- Opening theme: "Stripadilla" (Series 1), "Thurso" (Series 2)
- Country of origin: United Kingdom
- Original languages: Scots; English
- No. of series: 3 and specials
- No. of episodes: 22 (including pilot)

Production
- Executive producers: Colin Gilbert; Ewan Angus
- Producer: Rab Christie
- Production location: Greater Glasgow
- Editor: Calum Ross
- Running time: 30 minutes
- Production companies: The Comedy Unit; Bold Yin (Series 3)

Original release
- Network: BBC Two Scotland (Series 1 and 3); BBC One Scotland (Series 2); BBC Scotland (Burnistoun Tunes In)
- Release: 25 February 2009 – 24 February 2019

Burnistoun is a Scottish comedy sketch show broadcast by BBC Scotland, written by comedians Iain Connell and Robert Florence. The show was produced by The Comedy Unit and later in series 3 was co-produced by Bold Yin.

The series is set in a fictional Scottish town called Burnistoun in the greater Glasgow area and features a variety of odd and absurd characters. The town's name is derived from the Springburn and Dennistoun areas of Glasgow, where Florence and Connell, respectively, grew up.

Connell and Florence have previously written sitcoms such as Empty and Legit, and have created characters for Chewin' the Fat and The Karen Dunbar Show.

The show's third and final season ended in September 2012.

== Broadcast ==
The pilot was broadcast by BBC Two Scotland on 25 February 2009 and rerun on 29 March 2010. On 20, 22, and 25 January 2010, audience reaction screenings were shown at the Odeon Cinema, Springfield Quay, Glasgow, where approximately 240 minutes of unfinalized sketches were shown to assist the production team in their choice of material for the forthcoming series. The first episode of series one aired on 1 March 2010 at 10 pm on BBC Two Scotland.

Burnistoun ran for three series from 2010 to 2012. Each series contained six episodes for a total of eighteen episodes. Each episode ran for thirty minutes, composed of various unconnected sketches with a few running gags and characters (see below). There have been further one-off episodes, including Burnistoun's Big Night aired on 17 July 2015, Burnistoun Goes to Work aired on Christmas 2016, and Burnistoun Tunes In, shown at the launch of the BBC Scotland channel on 24 February 2019, nearly 10 years to the day the first episode was broadcast.

== Recurring characters and situations ==
- Scott and Peter: A show-long staple, Scott (Florence) and Peter (Connell) are two friends who frequently bicker over Scott's mockery of Peter.
- Kelly McGlade and the Sloppy Seconds: An aspiring girl band, led by the hot-tempered Kelly McGlade (Florence), and two other girls, Carly (Kirsty Strain) and Emma (Louise Stewart). Sketches usually involve Kelly getting into fights with her detractors bandmates. Kelly was killed in the final episode of the first series by the town's murderer, the Burnistoun Butcher.
- DJ Jesus: A recurring gag in the first series, where Jesus (Connell) is a DJ, earning the disapproval of his father, God (Florence).
- The Burnistoun Herald: The town's newspaper, headed by the bumbling, technologically challenged editor (Florence).
- Paul and Walter: Paul (Connell) and Walter (Florence), two seventeen-year-old brothers who bicker whilst running an ice-cream van, often insulting their customers or getting into petty fights in front of them. After being featured extensively in series one, they were killed off in series two when their van rolled into the ocean.
- The Burnistoun Butcher: A local serial killer (Connell) frustrated with how he is portrayed by the media and is often confused with an actual butcher (Florence). He is last seen in the second series, locked in Doberman Man's holding cells and still being confused with the actual butcher.
- MC Hottie Boxtrot: A local hip-hop artist who called Burnistoun a "shithole", played by Richard Rankin.
- Burnistoun DJ: The town's DJ (Connell), who is frequently annoyed by the odd guests on his show.
- Jolly Boy John: A young rapper (Connell) who makes videos of himself doing strange things in his room 'FOR REAL'.
- Alex Ciderson: The head of a company that sells a variety of strange and pointless products, such as a scarecrow used for scaring away teenagers (which doubles as a sex toy) and clones of Alex himself.
- Biscuity Boyle: A washed-up former athlete (Florence) whose sketches usually involve him attempting to advertise himself but accidentally farting in somebody's face, with his trousers falling shortly afterward.
- The Quality Polis: MacGregor (Connell) and Toshan (Florence), two bumbling, immature policemen who refer to themselves as "quality polis" (Scots for "police").
- James Jumpstyle: An energetic dancer (Florence) who advertises various odd services to jumpstyle music.
- Doberman Man: The local superhero, a man who was bitten by a Doberman as a child, turning him into a crime fighter (and parody of Batman). He is tormented by his high school bully and nemesis, Big Sanny Tolan's boy (Connell) who ridicules him for being a virgin.
- Joe and Barry: Two working-class men in a same-sex relationship who worry about doing non-stereotypical things.
- Burnistoun Kilty Club: A parody of The White Heather Club. Harry MacLauderie (Florence) sings various songs in "braid Scots" before switching to standard English for the last line, which is always about a famous current celebrity or pop culture phenomenon.
- Robert Clach: A documentary presenter (Connell) who frequently re-enacts Scottish battles, often attacking unsuspecting people admiring the local scenery. Due to his long hair and energetic style, Clach is often thought to be a parody of Scottish historical documentary presenter Neil Oliver.

== Live show ==
In March 2015, Connell and Florence created a live stage show based on Burnistoun, entitled Burnistoun: Live and For Real. The show, held at the Kings Theatre in Glasgow, featured Connell and Florence, supported by series regulars Louise Stewart and Gerry McLaughlin, bringing to life sketches and beloved characters such as the Quality Polis and Jolly Boy John. The show generated a very positive response from both fans and critics, and due to its success, more shows were scheduled for August 2015. The show also played at the 2016 Edinburgh Festival Fringe.
