= Next Time Ned =

- Directed by: Thomas McCue
- Written by: Thomas McCue
- Produced by: Thomas McCue; Raymond Mearns
- Starring: Raymond Mearns; Iain Robertson
- Cinematography: Sean Walker
- Music by: Woodenbox, Raymond Mearns
- Release dates: 2008 (EIFF); February 2009 (United Kingdom)
- Running time: 80 minutes
- Country: United Kingdom
- Language: English
- Budget: £3,000

Next Time Ned is a 2008 Scottish feature film, written and directed by Thomas McCue and starring Raymond Mearns as Ned Randall.

It featured Glasgow band San Sebastian on its soundtrack. The theme tune of "I Belong To Glasgow" was recorded by Glasgow band Funkilicious.

The film was premiered on 8 May 2009 at Jumping Jak's in Glasgow. A director's cut of the film was released on Amazon Prime Video in September 2020.

== Cast ==
- Raymond Mearns as Ned Randall
- Iain Robertson as Driving Casting Agent
- Scott Campbell as Interviewer
- Adrianne Boyd as Audrey Randall
- Lynn Mulvenna as Amy
- Sean Boyle as Danny
- Laura Pearson-Smith as Sharon (as Laura Pearson)
- Vivien Taylor as Leah
- Kevin McIntyre as Martin
- Ian Barrie as Hector
- Hayley Horbatowska as Hardmen Casting Director
- Michael McGill as Nigel
