= Limmy =

Scottish comedian (born 1974)

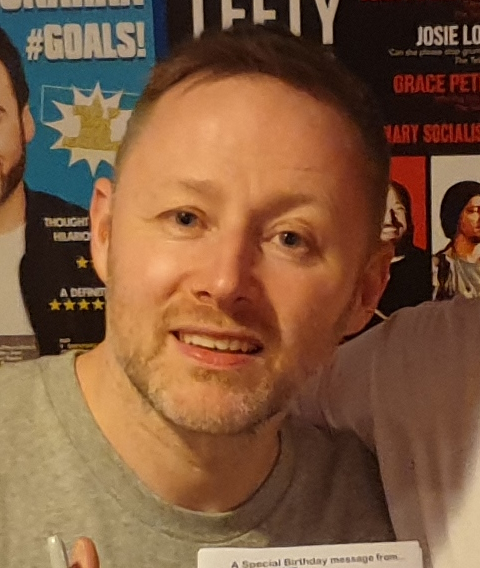
- Limmy in 2019
- Born: Brian Limond; 20 October 1974 (age 52); Glasgow, Scotland
- Occupations: Comedian; streamer; writer; web designer
- Years active: 2006–present
- Television: Limmy's Show, Limmy's Homemade Show, Limmy's Other Stuff, Charlie Brooker's Weekly Wipe
- Partner: Lynn McGowan (2000–2022; separated)
- Children: 1
- Awards: Two BAFTA Scotland Awards

Twitch information
- Channel: Limmy
- Followers: 494 thousand

YouTube information
- Channel: Limmy
- Years active: 2008–present
- Subscribers: 538 thousand
- Views: 116.9 million
- Last updated: 12 July 2026

Brian Limond (born 20 October 1974), known as Limmy, is a Scottish comedian, author, and online streamer.

While working as a website designer and Flash developer, Limmy began releasing comedy on his website and blog, Limmy.com, which contained various Flash-based projects. In late 2006, he released a daily podcast called Limmy's World of Glasgow, which received interest from the mainstream British media.

After continuing his comedy work for several years, Limmy was commissioned by BBC Scotland to create a sketch show, Limmy's Show. It ran for three series and a Christmas special between 2010 and 2013, and won two BAFTA Scotland awards. Limmy returned to BBC Scotland with another sketch comedy show, Limmy's Homemade Show, with a one-off episode in 2018 and a full series in 2020. Limmy has also engaged in various other pursuits, such as writing several books and performing live shows. He is a prolific user of online media platforms such as Twitter, YouTube, Twitch and formerly Vine.

== Early life ==
Brian Limond was born on 20 October 1974 to Jessie and Billy Limond in Glasgow, and grew up in the Carnwadric area of the city. He studied multimedia technology at Glasgow Caledonian University, graduating in 1996. He found success as a website designer and Flash developer after starting work at Glasgow-based new media company Black ID. In the summer of 2000, employees of Black ID created a rival company called Flammable Jam, where Limmy was a director. During his time there, he was asked to contribute to the book New Masters of Flash: The 2002 Annual, a resource for Macromedia Flash developers. In 2001, he co-founded the company Chunk Ideas, selling his stake in the company to co-founder Donnie Kerrigan in 2006, so he could concentrate on his comedy career. Due to similarities with features of his own Limmy.com website, it has been speculated that he also created or contributed to the Glasgow Survival site, which was popular in the early 2000s and satirised the city's ned culture with commentary and Flash games.

== Career ==
Scottish culture magazine The List listed Limmy at No. 14 on their "Hot 100" list in 2006, which celebrated the people who made the biggest impact on cultural life in Scotland over that year. In March 2007, Limmy took to the stage for two sold-out appearances at the Glasgow International Comedy Festival. In 2007, he played a character called Zack Eastwood in Consolevania and VideoGaiden. In June 2009, the BBC commissioned a six-episode series of Limmy's Show, a sketch show which premiered on BBC Scotland in January 2010. The BBC commissioned a second series of Limmy's Show, which premiered on BBC Scotland in February 2011. Limmy wrote a pilot for a sitcom based on Falconhoof, a recurring Limmy's Show character, but the show was turned down by BBC Scotland. He made a cameo appearance in The IT Crowd, playing a window cleaner with an unintelligible Glaswegian accent in the episode "The Final Countdown", which aired in July 2010.

In 2014, Limmy had a regular segment in the second series of the Charlie Brooker news satire show Weekly Wipe. He is also known for his live webcam chats, in which he interacts with fans and makes music. In 2015, Limmy wrote his first book titled Daft Wee Stories, published by Random House. To promote the book, Limmy embarked on a UK book reading tour. Three of the stories were also published in The Scotsman newspaper.

In January 2016, Limmy performed four nights at the Clyde Auditorium and one night at the Hammersmith Apollo, adapting material from this TV shows to become Limmy Live! On 1 May 2017, he released his second book of short stories, That's Your Lot, embarking on a similar UK book reading tour to his first.

Limmy appeared on Richard Herring's Leicester Square Theatre Podcast in 2015, 2017, and 2020. He also appeared on The Blindboy Podcast in 2020.

Limmy has been noted for the parody tributes he often tweets on the announcement of a celebrity's death; he invariably posts that he "had the pleasure of meeting [them] at a charity do once. [They were] surprisingly down to earth, and VERY funny". Following the death of nightclub owner Peter Stringfellow, his tweet was mistakenly reported as a genuine tribute by Sky News.

In 2017, the BBC commissioned what was then a one-off special of Limmy's Homemade Show, which was broadcast in April 2018. Originally intended to be a web series before being picked up by the BBC, the show is produced, performed, directed, filmed, and edited by Limmy alone, and takes place in or around his home. A follow-up series was commissioned by the BBC and began airing in April 2020. After the airing of his one-off commentary Limmy's Other Stuff in October 2020, Limmy announced his retirement from television, citing his mental health, as doing TV work made him "fucking suicidal". Since 2018, Limmy has been livestreaming almost daily on the website Twitch, where he plays video games, chats to fans and tells improvised comedy stories.

== Personal life ==
Limmy has struggled with depression, suicidal thoughts and alcoholism, and has discussed this on social media and in interviews. He gave up drinking alcohol in 2004. Limmy was in a relationship with Lynn McGowan from 2000; in January 2022, she announced they had separated. They have one son. Limmy is an atheist and supports Scottish independence.

== Filmography ==
| Year | Title | Role | Notes |
|---|---|---|---|
| 2007 | Consolevania | Zack Eastwood | |
| 2007 | VideoGaiden | Zack Eastwood | |
| 2010 | The IT Crowd | Window cleaner | Series 4, episode 2: "The Final Countdown" |
| 2010–2013 | Limmy's Show | Various characters | 20 episodes Creator, writer, director, animator |
| 2011 | Charlie Brooker's 2011 Wipe | Himself | |
| 2014 | Charlie Brooker's Weekly Wipe | Himself | Five episodes |
| 2015 | Pompidou | Handyman | |
| 2018–2020 | Limmy's Homemade Show | Various characters | Creator, writer, director, producer, editor |
| 2020 | Limmy's Other Stuff | Himself | Creator, writer, director, producer, editor |

== Bibliography ==
- Daft Wee Stories (2015) ISBN 978-1780893754
- That's Your Lot (2017) ISBN 978-0008172602
- Surprisingly Down to Earth, and Very Funny (2019) ISBN 978-0008294663

== Awards ==
- 2011 British Academy Scotland Award (Limmy's Show)
- 2013 British Academy Scotland Award for Best Comedy/Entertainment Programme (Limmy's Show)
