= VideoGaiden =

- Logo used for series 1 and 2
- Starring: Robert Florence; Richard Rankin; Ryan Macleod; Kenny Swanston; Louise Stewart
- Country of origin: Scotland
- No. of series: 4
- No. of episodes: 40 (list of episodes)

Production
- Running time: 10 mins (Series 1); 30 mins (Series 2); 11–13 mins (Series 3); 16–20 mins (Series 4)

Original release
- Network: BBC Two Scotland
- Release: December 2005 – April 2016

VideoGaiden is a Scottish computer games television show that was broadcast by BBC Two Scotland. Its creators and presenters, Robert Florence ("Rab") and Ryan Macleod, were responsible for the internet-distributed videogaming show Consolevania, upon which the show is based.

The show began as six ten-minute episodes on BBC Two Scotland, broadcast at around midnight on Fridays starting in December 2005. The episodes were also able to be viewed online from the BBC's web site. A second series, consisting of six half-hour episodes, was commissioned by popular demand and began broadcast on Sunday 5 November 2006 at 11:10pm, with episodes once again available on the BBC's website. A third series consisting of eighteen weekly 11-minute online episodes began in December 2007, with three half-hour TV specials episodes also being produced. A Christmas special aired on 23 December 2007.

A fourth series of the show was announced on 31 December 2015. Series 4 began in March 2016, and consists of six online episodes and one televised special.

Gaiden (外伝) is a Japanese word meaning 'side-story', a reference to the show's relationship to its predecessor Consolevania.

== Format ==
=== Series One (2005) ===
Each episode opened with a brief satirical mention of the show's status within the BBC and the feedback it has received. This was typically followed by the first of many discursive game reviews. These featured one of the two lead presenters walking around an indoor or outdoor setting discussing the game in question. Footage from the game was superimposed on background objects and occasionally cut to directly during the discussion.

Somewhat in keeping with the way in which Consolevania was shot on MiniDV, the majority of series was filmed on a Sony HVR-Z1U This small scale camera made in possible to shoot series in 16:9, but without an expensive DigiBeta kit and crew; something that the small production budget would not allow.

Recurring features unique to the first series were sketches about terrible video game pitches (like Black and White Minstrel Show 2006), Glasgow hard-man Barry Anoki reporting on video game news, and a spoof soap opera about video game development called DevCo. The "Gaiden Top 100" was ostensibly a series of talking-head interviews on the best games of all time, but in fact provided thinly veiled mockery or game-inspired jokes.

Each episode in this series ended with a brief sketch which ran over the end credits, featuring a fictional world-famous video gamer called Legend (a carry-over from Consolevania) discussing his childhood.

=== Series Two (2006) ===
The second series had less of a sketch basis. While the opening comments and the style of reviews were the same and the Top 100 returned, most of the comedy was changed. This series also included a wide range of special guests, such as journalist Charlie Brooker and actor Colin Baker appearing in character as the Sixth Doctor.

Non-game reviews were featured in the style of a new games journalism panel discussion called "Eternal Pixel" (compare to Newsnight Review). More episodes of Eternal Pixel were filmed than aired, with plans to release these additional episodes online; however, these did not come to fruition. In the first three episodes there was a "funeral" for a now-deceased console, followed by recommendations of notable games. Each episode included "A Warning From History", showcasing appalling old gaming action, followed by a game recommendation from Socrates, a "games criticism robot" made from cardboard. Of particular note was the "Gaiden Guide to..." series by Robert Florence, sternly calling for change in a particular aspect of gaming culture (for example standards of journalism). Each episode of the second series signed off with a song about the series' far-from-universal appeal.

The show also ran an (apparently BBC-sanctioned) campaign to have the Shenmue series either continued or permanently consigned to history. Rab and Ryan called on gamers to produce Shenmue tributes or outright mockery, respectively. Updates on the progress of the campaign including notable comments on the internet were included in each episode. Rab won overall, with the public favouring the return of Shenmue. However, an unofficial statement from Sega warned them not to expect a new installment for some time.

The series ended with "The VideoGaiden Awards 2006" in which Rab and Ryan chose the best game of 2006. The winner of this award was Hitman: Blood Money. It was also in this episode that Rab fell on Socrates, crushing him beyond repair in the process.

=== Series Three (2007–2008) ===
Series three was broadcast online on the BBC's VideoGaiden website, with each weekly episode lasting around 11 to 13 minutes. The series generally contained two regular reviews lasting a couple of minutes each, and one shorter review comprising only video game footage and voice overs. These would be interspersed with short comedy sketches. Each episode would also have a bookending pair of sketches that would only rarely be returned to during the course of the series as a whole.

An ongoing serial called Hunter and Rayorg featuring CGI versions of Rab and Ryan was one of only two recurring sketches. The other was VideoGaiden Worldwide News, which had Rab and Ryan interviewing a number of correspondents: a manager from a games store in Scotland (G-Force, Glasgow) who announced that week's top-selling titles; an English correspondent who is clearly Scottish; and a woman in Japan, who would always end up reviewing Japanese cuisine, despite claiming that she was talking about video games. Each week would also see Rab and Ryan trying to contact a representative in the US, before announcing that they couldn't get the satellite link-up working and giving up. This was changed briefly in episodes four and five, when US comedians Tim Heidecker and Eric Wareheim (both of Tom Goes to the Mayor fame) made guest appearances.

=== Series Four (2016) ===
On New Year's Eve 2015, Ryan Macleod and Robert Florence via Periscope announced a return of videoGaiden, after eight years. The first episode was released on YouTube on 3 March 2016. Series 4 features review segments, the videoGaiden top 100, Ryan's coverage of indie games, Rab's coverage of board games and segments of the two realising they are trapped in an existential prison.

== See also ==
- Legit
- Robert Florence
- Burnistoun
