= Robert Florence =

Scottish presenter and comedian

- Born: 29 July 1977 (age 49); Glasgow, Scotland
- Other names: Rab, The Pyramid
- Notable work: Consolevania; videoGaiden; Legit; Empty; Burnistoun; Frankie Boyle's Tramadol Nights

Robert Luke McBrian Florence (born 29 July 1977) is a Scottish television presenter, comedian and writer who starred in the BBC comedy sketch show Burnistoun.

== Early life ==
Robert Florence was born on 29 July 1977 and was raised in a working-class family in Balornock, Glasgow. His father and brothers are roofers.

He and future writing collaborator Iain Connell met as a pair of fifteen-year-olds at a Springburn amateur youth theatre project, Toonspeak. His sole stage appearance was at a stand-up comedy night in Petershill, Springburn, for which he dressed up as David Bowie. Florence spent a year on a film and television studies course at Cardonald College.

== Career ==
He was a core writer of the sketch show Chewin' the Fat and with Iain Connell wrote the sitcom series Legit and Empty. Connell and Florence have recently worked on the third series of Burnistoun, which is set in a fictional Scottish city. The first series was shown on BBC 2 Scotland in early 2010; the second was shown on BBC 1 Scotland in early 2011 and the third began in August 2012. Florence has also been a performer on Frankie Boyle's Tramadol Nights for Channel 4.

In a 2012 article for Eurogamer, Florence criticised the relationship between the video games press and publishers, characterising it as "almost indistinguishable from PR", and questioned the integrity of a games journalist, Lauren Wainwright. In the controversy that followed, dubbed "Doritogate" (after a video of Geoff Keighley emerged of him sitting in front of bottles of Mountain Dew, bags of Doritos and an ad banner for Halo 4), the threat of legal action—the result of broad libel laws in the UK—caused Eurogamer to self-censor. Eurogamer's editor-in-chief Tom Bramwell censored the article, and Florence consequently retired from video games journalism.

Florence also makes an online show about boardgames called DowntimeTown and is the writer/performer/editor/creator of a review show for Xbox Live called The Independent Charles Show (sometimes purposefully misspelled The Independint Charles Show). Cardboard Children was a regular feature on boardgames that Florence contributed to UK-based PC gaming blog Rock, Paper, Shotgun between 2010 and 2016.

== Personal life ==
Florence is a Celtic supporter. In June 2013, he lost to Greg Hemphill in a professional wrestling contest at the Kelvin Hall which served as the venue's final act before closing down. Florence’s niece, Courtney Stewart, is a professional wrestler.

== Credits ==
=== Television ===
- Chewin' the Fat (writer)
- Velvet Soup (writer)
- Live Floor Show (writer)
- videoGaiden (writer/actor/presenter)
- Legit (writer)
- Charlie Brooker's Screenwipe (guest appearance)
- The Karen Dunbar Show (writer)
- Watson's Wind Up (writer)
- Velvet Cabaret (writer)
- Empty (writer)
- Revolver (writer)
- Charlie Brooker's Gameswipe (guest appearance)
- Burnistoun (actor/writer)
- Mock the Week (writer)
- Frankie Boyle's Tramadol Nights (actor/writer)
- Enlighten Up! (writer/actor)
- The Sunny (writer/actor)
- The Scotts (actor/writer)
- GamesMaster (presenter/creative consultant)
- Queen of the New Year (actor/writer)

=== Films ===
- The House of Him (2014)

=== Online series ===
- consolevania (writer/actor/presenter)
- DowntimeTown (writer/actor/presenter)
- The Independint Charles Show (Xbox LIVE) (writer/actor/presenter)

=== Print and online writing ===
- GamesTM (guest writer)
- Disposable Media (guest columnist)
- Custom PC (columnist)
- Rock Paper Shotgun (columnist)
- Eurogamer.net (columnist)
