= Frankie Boyle's Tramadol Nights =

- Channel 4 promotional image
- Also known as: Tramadol Nights
- Genre: Sketch show
- Created by: Frankie Boyle
- Written by: Frankie Boyle; Jim Muir; Tom Stade; Robert Florence
- Starring: Frankie Boyle; Jim Muir; Tom Stade; Robert Florence; Thaila Zucchi; Funmbi Omotayo; Nathalie Sampson
- Opening theme: "Let Her Dance" performed by the Bobby Fuller Four
- Country of origin: United Kingdom
- Original language: English
- No. of series: 1
- No. of episodes: 6

Production
- Producer: Tom Thostrup
- Running time: 23–24 minutes
- Production company: The Comedy Unit

Original release
- Network: Channel 4
- Release: 30 November – 29 December 2010

Frankie Boyle's Tramadol Nights is a comedy sketch show created in 2010 by Frankie Boyle, starring Boyle himself alongside Jim Muir, Tom Stade, Robert Florence and Thaila Zucchi.

== History ==
In October 2009, Boyle announced online that he would be leaving BBC panel show Mock the Week after seven series to focus on his tour and "some other funny things I'm writing". Later that month, he told The Daily Mirror that his new material would include a comedy sketch show for Channel 4, without censoring any of the black humour he had become known for. An appearance on Friday Night with Jonathan Ross followed, when Boyle revealed that the show was originally called Deal with This, Retards, but had to be changed to avoid offence. The show was consequently renamed Frankie Boyle's Tramadol Nights (a reference to the opioid drug Tramadol and the J. G. Ballard novel Cocaine Nights), with a broadcast date of November–December 2010.

== Content ==
The show mixed pre-recorded comedy sketches with stand-up routines before a studio audience.

== Critical reception ==
The show received a mixed critical reception. The first episode, broadcast on 30 November 2010 after an advertising campaign on London buses, attracted a "modest" audience (1.54 million viewers including the time-shifted repeat the same evening). The free daily newspaper Metro applauded the first episode's blend of stand-up and sketches, that "cantered gleefully – but never gratuitously - past the boundaries of taste and decency" with "some fantastically acerbic rants about religious people and the mentally ill."

The Independent's Rhiannon Harries felt "the best of the sketches were those that satirised the bland inanity of TV culture" but was "less comfortable with the jokes about mental illness" that more or less "conflated religion and autism", concluding that there was "something very brittle about the laughter. The world seems a meaner place after listening to Boyle." The Liverpool Echo observed that "in a former life, not so long ago, Boyle was the best thing about Mock the Week" but thought the new series' uncompromising material "was, somehow, over the top and below the belt at the same time," culminating in a parody of Knight Rider that was "one of the most tedious and unfunny sketches in the history of tedious and unfunny sketches."

In The Guardian, John Crace, noting that the absence of previews was usually PR speak for "We don't think it's much good and we want to avoid it getting a kicking," implied that Boyle's standup sequences were re-hashed from his recent "least exciting" tour. The conclusion that Boyle – known for "heartless sensitivity-baiting and not much else" – has been given "enough rope to hang himself" is difficult to resist. But "there are flashes of the caustic wit that make him great" and "even to those who've heard his jokes before, there are laugh-out-loud moments." Writing in The Scotsman, Aidan Smith said he didn't find any of the jokes very funny and the filmed sketches "showed up Boyle's limitations as a comic actor." MSN's Stuart Bak wondered whether Frankie Boyle was still funny. In sketch form, his material is "neither particularly offensive nor particularly funny, but a bit run-of-the-mill and even, at times, embarrassingly awful" so Boyle should "stick to the stand-up." The British Comedy Guide branded the show "disappointing", citing "over-long sketches" and an "almost childish fixation on sex".

On 7 December the second episode (including the time-shifted repeat) reached 1.14 million viewers, down 26% on week one. Metro withdrew its support, claiming "laughs were thin on the ground" in the second week and that in the third episode "almost without exception, the sketches were wholly unfunny and the in-house audience seemed to be struggling to raise even the smallest of titters." The final episode was broadcast on 29 December and averaged an audience of 575,000.

== Controversy ==
=== Harvey Price ===
In December 2010, both Katie Price and Peter Andre were said to have been left "absolutely disgusted and sickened" by a joke in the 7 December 2010 broadcast about Price's disabled son, Harvey (then 8 years old). On the show, Boyle said: "Apparently Jordan [Katie Price] and Peter Andre are fighting each other over custody of Harvey - well eventually one of them'll lose and have to keep him. I have a theory that Jordan married a cage fighter cause she needed someone strong enough to stop Harvey from fucking her."

In a response, Katie Price said: "If Mr Boyle had a 10th of his courage and decency he would know that to suggest, let alone think funny, that Harvey may sexually attack me is vile and deeply unfair. To bully this unbelievably brave child is despicable, to broadcast it on television is to show a complete and utter lack of judgment." Peter Andre's representative also responded to the comments made by Boyle and said "We're all disgusted by these comments. Peter is angry and very upset at Harvey being mocked in this way. Children, especially a disabled youngster, should be off-limits." Both have confirmed that they are seeking legal action and have written a complaint to Channel 4 regarding Boyle's jokes with Katie saying "To bully this unbelievably brave child is despicable; to broadcast it is to show a complete and utter lack of judgement. I have asked my lawyers to write to Channel 4." The charity Mencap described Boyle's joke as a "disgusting" attack on a disabled child.

In April 2011, Ofcom upheld 500 complaints about the incident and censured Boyle and Channel 4 for broadcasting the jokes, which had been personally cleared by Channel 4's Chief Executive David Abraham, ruling that the material appeared to directly target and mock the mental and physical disabilities of a known eight-year-old child who had not himself chosen to be in the public eye. "As such, Ofcom found that the comments had considerable potential to be highly offensive to the audience."

=== Racism ===
In a later episode, Boyle was criticised by some media outlets for using racially offensive terms. A character played by Boyle used the term 'Pakis' during a joke criticising prioritisation of British and western war casualties over others in UK news media.

In July 2011, the Daily Mirror published an article which strongly criticised Boyle, describing him as a 'racist comedian'. In response, he sued the Mirror for libel, and was awarded £54,650 damages after a High Court jury found he had been libelled. Boyle said after the case that he intended to donate the money to charity.

== DVD release ==
The series was released on DVD on 21 November 2011. The Harvey Price joke from episode two has been cut from the DVD version.
