= Iain Connell =

Scottish comedian and actor

- Born: Iain Connell; 10 August 1976 (age 50); Glasgow, Scotland
- Other name: Mr Sharp Sand
- Notable work: Legit; Empty; Burnistoun; The Scotts

Comedy career
- Years active: 1997–present

Iain Connell (born 10 August 1976) is a Scottish comedian and actor known for his work alongside fellow comedian Robert Florence. His acting credits include Legit, Rab C. Nesbitt and most notably Burnistoun.

He has written for many successful Scottish comedies such as Legit, Empty and, along with Robert Florence, Burnistoun. He has released songs on Spotify under the name Iain Connell and regularly posts on his social media.

== TV work ==
- Burnistoun as Various (also wrote)
- Rab C. Nesbitt as Gordon Conway
- Empty as Husband (also wrote)
- Legit as Wendall (also wrote)
- The Scotts as Henry Scott (also wrote)

== Writing ==
- Chewin' The Fat (Hogmanay Special 2000)
- Revolver (TV Series)
- Legit (TV Series)
- Empty (TV Series)
- Burnistoun (co-wrote with Robert Florence)
- The Sunny (TV Pilot)
