= Consolevania =

- Starring: Robert Florence; Ryan Macleod; Gerry McLaughlin; Kenny Swanston
- Country of origin: Scotland
- No. of series: 9
- No. of episodes: 105 (list of episodes)

Production
- Running time: Approx. 30 - 60 minutes

Original release
- Release: 10 March 2004 – 16 January 2009
- Release: 18 February 2017 – present

Related
- videoGaiden

Consolevania is a video games TV show filmed in and around Glasgow, Scotland. It is notable as one of very few online TV shows to make the leap onto broadcast TV as the show videoGaiden, which has had four series shown on BBC Scotland.

The name Consolevania is a reference to Konami's long-running horror-adventure game series Castlevania and was chosen by RLLMUK forum members before the first episode was shot. Fittingly, the first game reviewed on the show was Castlevania: Lament of Innocence.

The first episode was filmed in early 2004 and initially distributed on CDs posted out by the team. Eventually all episodes became distributed online via the BitTorrent peer-to-peer network, although an archive of http first and second series downloads now exists and lower quality http downloads are released concurrently with the more recent BitTorrent releases.

On 23 January 2017, it was announced via Patreon that a new series of Consolevania was planned for production. The first episode of the new run was released on 18 February 2017, and the show is following a regular monthly release schedule.

== History ==
Consolevania was first released online in 2004, presented by Robert Florence, former writer for BBC comedy Chewin' the Fat, and Ryan Macleod. Primary coverage was of console games; however, since the donation of a PC by sponsor Alienware at the start of Series Two, PC games have also been reviewed. Much of the audience for the early episodes came from various online discussion forums, in particular RLLMUK (itself seen by many as the spiritual home of Consolevania) and NTSC-UK.

The show gradually gained a substantial internet following, largely by word of mouth, and began to attract the attention of both mainstream and video gaming media. Following the description of the show by Sky News as having "something that almost every other games show ever created has lacked: true passion for the subject matter," the BBC expressed interest in the show, reportedly since it garners "more viewers than some shows they produce already.". The show received widespread underground popularity and is now a global entity.

BBC Scotland commissioned a games review show from First Person Shooters in a similar vein to Consolevania, titled videoGaiden. This was broadcast on BBC Two Scotland from November to December 2005 for six weeks.

In April 2006, it was reported that Consolevania had acquired the movie rights to the Jeff Minter computer game Hover Bovver. Though they had claimed that the adaptation would be released at some point in 2007, there have been no further updates since. With no statements issued by Minter about the status of the arrangement, it is presumed that the movie did not get any further than pre-production, or even enter it.

New episodes of Consolevania were released online on an irregular basis, and, in response to much critical acclaim, a second run of videoGaiden, featuring lengthier episodes, was commissioned by BBC Scotland and aired in late 2006. The third series however, has hugely focused on internet-only episodes of which 18 were made and released over a six-month period. The only material that was made specifically for broadcast were just three "TV Specials". The decision to focus so heavily on internet output seems to be in line with a soapbox piece from the second series. In this segment, Robert Florence stated that television is a dying medium and that the BBC needed to accept this and embrace internet programming, an area they currently do not understand.

On 10 October 2008, Series 4 premiered on Consolevania.com, alongside a newly redesigned website. Series 4 was presented in a new way, with separate segments being uploaded frequently to YouTube. These segments were also used in new "high quality digest" episodes of compiled and exclusive content.

== Format and style ==
The show primarily consists of a mixture of video game-related comedy sketches, reviews of both newly released and older video games, and occasional preview features highlighting forthcoming titles, especially those that appear unusual or eccentric. The lighthearted comedic approach of the show is met with clear passion for video games and knowledge of the medium's history. The program has sometimes experimented with unusual visual effects, such as flash edits and periods of slow-motion. Much of the humour is referential, expressing knowledge of a variety of video games of both mainstream popularity and relative obscurity. This ability to mock the video game industry whilst remaining affectionate toward it is typical of Consolevania's style.

Where previous video game TV shows such as Bits and Thumb Bandits claimed irreverence with their use of swear words but still were forced to operate within the established systems of television production, Florence and Macleod are able to dictate the content of their own show without the need for censorship to avoid offence. Examples of content likely to be restricted on United Kingdom television are the inclusion of characters such as Adolf Hitler and John Wayne Gacy, although these characters are for the most part mocked in the show as opposed to praised in any way.

The fact that the show is self-produced by Florence and Macleod's own production company has presented some issues of budget. In the first series, the equipment was mostly rented, and as such the release of the shows were very irregular. An upshoot of this lack of budget was the microphone used by the team, an omnidirectional device attached to a bent wire coathanger covered in red duct tape. It was frequently thrown at whichever character or presenter was on camera at the start of each sketch or review. However, there was no sign of the microphone at the start of the second series and the show's creators claim it was buried after a night of drunken revelry. Eventually, during the show's 'Independents Day' episode, it was unearthed and so may find itself in service once again.

Some of the show's other recurring themes and sketches include:

- The team engaging in various physical activities whilst shouting "tap tap tap" (in reference to 'button bashing' athletics games such as Track and Field).
- The misadventures of Adolf Hitler and his bizarre cohort El Zomba (see below), the former apparently interested in taking over the show for his own nefarious purposes, the latter being his sometime assistant and possibly lover.
- John Gacy's "Kiddies' Corner", where the notorious serial killer reviews video games aimed at children.
- Impromptu interviews with members of the public about games, conducted by one of the show's most popular characters, an American known only as Legend (see below).
- Video game cosplay, with an emphasis on the ridiculous.
- Overblood, a video game the team display a passionate distaste for.

Perhaps also an issue of budget, there was some inconsistency in the lengths of early episodes, varying runtimes between 45 minutes to an hour. However, the show's creators claim they have now found a format they are happy with and consequently later episodes have been just over 30 minutes in length. At the start of the second series, a basic awards system has been introduced, where the team awarded gold, blue, or brown ribbons to video games that they consider exceptional (gold), very good (blue), or particularly poor (brown). However, as the next episode abandoned this system for one based on Jeff Minter using a torch, it is likely that the new ratings system was never intended to be taken seriously.

== Video game industry satire ==
Consolevania often satirizes major industry figures and companies, both with impersonating caricatures (such as Lionhead Studios developer Peter Molyneux) and the manipulation of press conference videos for humor (Reggie Fils-Aimé of Nintendo of America and Sony's Ken Kutaragi, among many others).

Microsoft's J Allard is also frequently satirized. In a QuizVania segment in Episode 2.3, Allard is listed 2nd in the list of "10 Things that are an Embarrassment to the Games Industry". During this suggestion, the message "Act your fucking age" is flashed on screen.

In Episode 2.1, Consolevania presented a video game proposal to Rockstar Games for a "next-generation" title, Manpuncher vs. Boxhead. This consisted of a video short resembling a '70s police drama starring a gruff anti-authority figure who punches children and fights villains who all conveniently use the same 3D model to cut production costs. Rockstar politely rejected the proposal.

In recent episodes, the Consolevania team have issued taunting challenges for a street fight to Codemasters and Rare.

On 13 September 2007, Consolevania made a major splash with an incisive satirical parody of a Halo 3 promotional advertisement. The parody addressed an under-discussed issue with Xbox Live online gaming—the bad behaviour of a large proportion of the subscribers.

== Cast ==
- Robert Florence - One of the show's two reviewers, using the pseudonym Mr. Robert, he also plays the parts of John Gacy, El Zomba, and Xbox Live World Champion, Legend.
- Michael S. Hoffs - Plays the role of Hitler and Peter Molyneux, though Michael has not been featured since the second episode of the second series.
- Ryan Macleod - The second main reviewer, as Mr. Ryan. He also plays Sammy Miller.
- Kenny Swanston - Introduced into the show in the third episode (though playing an unnamed, masked wrestler in the first), Kenny is seen repeatedly antagonising and bullying Mr. Robert and Mr. Ryan, both of whom are intimidated by his presence. He berates them for their incompetence and forever telling others that he will "show them how it's fucking done". Their fear seems justified, as Kenny's particularly violent lessons tend to involve a thorough beating or, at their very worst, liberal use of Force lightning. At the end of Series 2, Kenny left the Consolevania TEAM to become the leader of the Dreamcast Universe, however, he returned in the first episode of Series 3 for reasons as yet unknown.
- Joanne Daly is a series regular and also appeared in each episode of the BBC sister show videoGaiden. She is also responsible for Consolevania.com's current design.
- Louise Stewart has been featured in a variety of supporting roles, along with Louise's young sister Courtney Stewart, who vexes Gacy.
- Allan Miller joins the cast in series three as the paranoid 'Ziggy Springsteen', a representative of the sponsors.
- Limmy, first seen in series 3 as overconfident 'Zack Eastwood', he also was in many episodes of videoGaiden series 3.
- Richard Rankin, introduced in the reviews section of the Consolevania website, makes his debut in the show in the second episode of the third series—appearing in a starring role in "Ken Loach's Halo".

Many members of the cast work behind the camera as crew, either directing, filming or later editing the show.

== Recurring characters ==
- Legend - A brash American who claims to be the Xbox Live World Champion, having defeated Lisasimpson45 in both Mech Assault and Halo 2 deathmatch. The main street interviewer in the show, he hails from Milwaukee in Wisconsin, and wears a Russian ushanka. An interview with Rab and Ryan in GamesTM Magazine in February 2007 suggested that Legend is unlikely to return in Series Three due to the fact that the team are unkeen on 'comedy that takes the piss out of unwitting members of the public'.
- John Gacy - Based upon the serial killer John Wayne Gacy, this is one of the more controversial characters. A clown dressed in top hat and black coat, he presents the "children's" section of the show. Most of the humour in his segments consists of Freudian slips inadvertently revealing that he's a paedophilic serial killer, or reading out "fan" letters which contain pleas for help before quickly correcting himself.
- Hitler - Constantly frustrated and depressed following his defeat in World War II, Hitler's segments are vitriolic diatribes about his dissatisfaction and struggles with video games and the internet. He was about to commit suicide during the show's Christmas Special, but reconsidered after he was visited by a Guardian Angel claiming to be Patrick Moore. When Moore showed Hitler how fantastic the world would be if he had never existed (in reference to It's a Wonderful Life) he gained a new sense of purpose in life, and headed off to make the world miserable and make Consolevania his own.
- El Zomba - Hitler's cohort and life partner (Hitler once despairs that he/she is once again pregnant) and an ogre-like character (Mr. Robert, wearing only a professional wrestling mask and tape around the groin). He is incompetent in the extreme.
- Sammy Miller - Consolevania's safety advisor, commenting upon gaming safety and the potential side-effects of video games, many of which subsequently befall him.
- Shigsy - The presenter of "The Shigsy Show", he is a lecherous sock puppet. As his nickname may suggest, he is supposed to represent Nintendo's game designer and artist, Shigeru Miyamoto.

== See also ==
- VideoGaiden
- Charlie Brooker's Gameswipe
