= J Allard =

American businessman

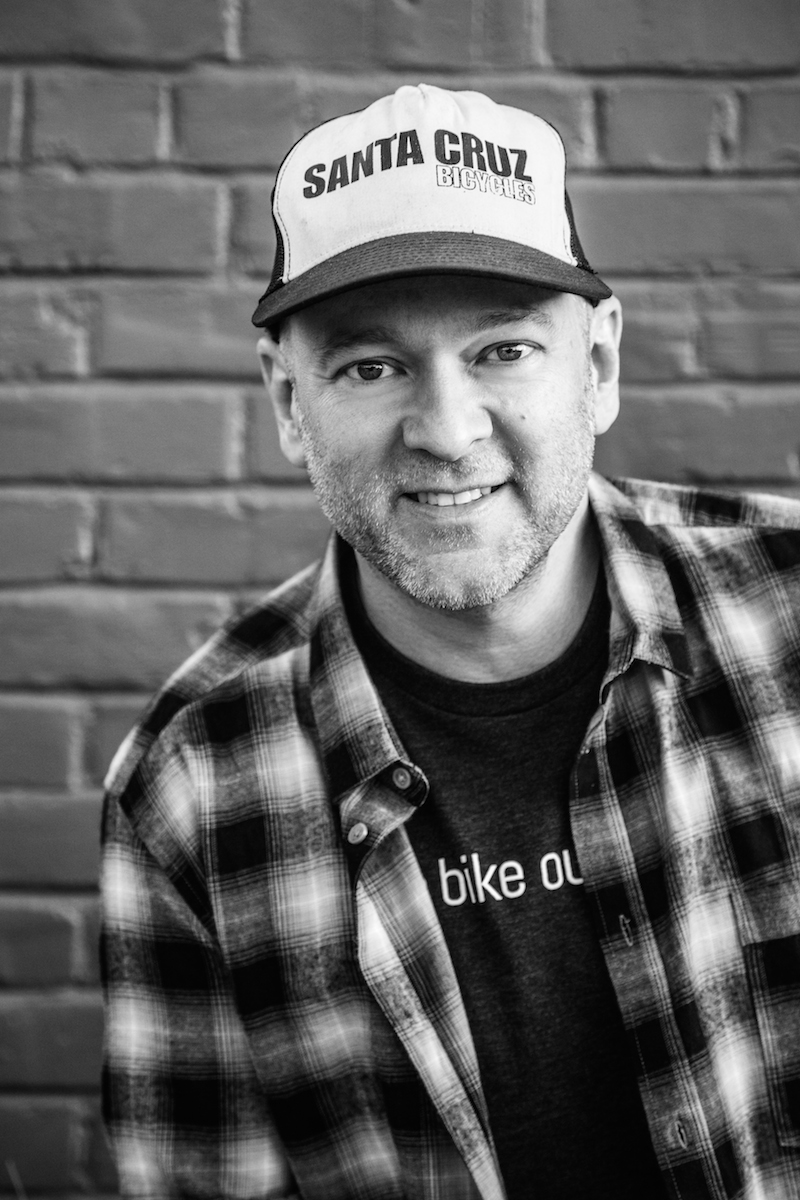
- Allard in 2014
- Born: James Allard; January 12, 1969 (age 57); Glens Falls, New York
- Occupation: Businessman
- Known for: Former Microsoft executive
- Website: www.project529.com

J Allard (born James Allard, on January 12, 1969 in Glens Falls, New York) is an American businessman. He is the chief executive officer of Project 529, a company that builds software for cyclists and law enforcement. Prior to starting Project 529, Allard was chief technology and experience officer for the Entertainment and Devices Division at Microsoft. He was instrumental in bringing Microsoft into the Internet age, leading the development of Internet technologies for Windows, and oversaw the company's first foray into the video game industry. Allard shipped over 30 products during his tenure at Microsoft and was a founding member of many Microsoft businesses, including Xbox, Xbox 360, Xbox Live, Windows NT and the TCP/IP product families.

== Education ==
Allard is a 1991 Boston University graduate with a bachelor's degree in computer science. In 2003, he received the Distinguished Alumni award and delivered the CS department commencement address. He later received an honorary degree (Doctor of Letters) from Boston University at the 2009 Boston University commencement ceremony alongside Larry Bird and Steven Spielberg. In 2019, Allard was awarded an Edmund Hillary Fellowship (EHF) to New Zealand, joining a community of entrepreneurs and investors to create global change.

== Project 529 ==
Allard started the 529 Garage bicycle registration service in 2014 in Portland, Oregon. Today Project 529 is the world's largest bike registration network, approaching two million registered bikes. The service is used by bicycle owners, cities, law enforcement, universities and bike shops as a registration, reporting and recovery program. Since launching the first official test city of Vancouver, Canada in 2015, bike theft has dropped over 35% and thousands of stolen bicycles have been reunited with their owners. The program is now rapidly expanding throughout North America and has captured the attention of the World Bank.

== Microsoft ==
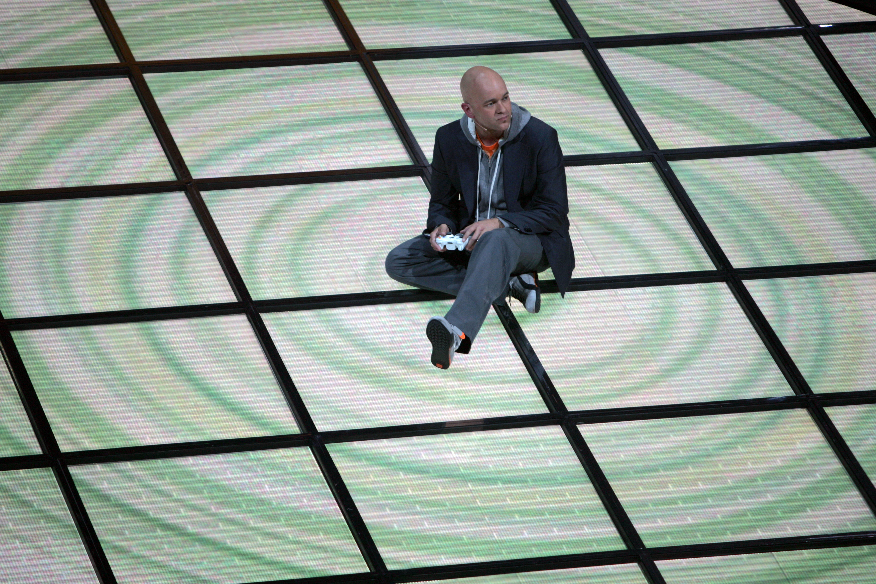
J. Allard presenting at the 2005 Xbox conference, Shrine Auditorium, Los Angeles.

Allard joined Microsoft in 1991, recruited from Boston University as a program manager on the LAN Manager team overseeing the network protocol efforts and NDIS program. The former chief experience officer is best known for developing the Xbox product family, as well as his 1994 memo, "Windows: The Next Killer Application on the Internet", encouraging the Microsoft team to embrace the Internet. The memo, distributed to Microsoft leaders, captured the attention of Bill Gates and is cited for reshaping the company's direction, earning Allard the reputation as "Microsoft's Father of the Internet." According to an internal email, Allard was a network engineer responsible for convincing Microsoft to ship TCP/IP in Windows 95.

Allard co-founded the Xbox project in 1999, primarily focused on the Xbox software platform, Xbox Live, and recruiting third-party developers and publishers to support the program. He was later promoted to the position of CTO and CXO of the Entertainment and Devices Division. This role had Allard building a unified design team, an incubation and prototyping team called Alchemie Ventures and new product development such as Zune, Kin and Courier. Throughout his career, Allard was an advocate for open standards serving on the Windows Sockets, IETF, IAB and W3C organizations. He often served as a media spokesperson for Microsoft as part of his product and standards work.

=== Products shipped ===
- LAN Manager (2.0, 2.1, 2.2, TCP/IP Utilities for LAN Manager, Remote Access for LAN Manager, Macintosh Services for LAN Manager, Windows Sockets 1.0, 2.0)
- Windows (Windows NT 3.1, 3.5, 3.51, 4.0, 5.0, TCP/IP for Windows for Workgroups, Windows 95, Windows 98, Windows NT Option Kit)
- Internet Information Server (1.0, 2.0, 3.0, 4.0, 5.0, Active Server Pages 1.0, 2.0, Active Data Objects 2.0, Microsoft Transaction Server, Microsoft XML)
- Xbox (Xbox 1.0, Xbox Live, Xbox 360, Xbox peripherals, XNA, Xbox Music)
- Entertainment & Devices (Zune 30, 4, 8, 80, HD, Zune Pass, Zune 1.0, 2.0, 3.0, 4.0, Kin, Courier)

=== Zune ===
The Zune program started following the launch of the Xbox 360 in 2007 . It was co-led by Allard (product) and Bryan Lee (business). When Lee stepped down in 2007 from his post as Zune Executive in charge of business development, Allard took over as the new executive. Allard oversaw development of the Microsoft Zune, a handheld portable media device, initially seen by some media as a potential iPod rival. The first generation Zune shipped in 2006 and sold more units than all non-iPod MP3 players sold in its first year.

=== Kin ===
The Microsoft Kin phone project, first known by the codename 'Project Pink', began under Allard in 2008. After an internal power struggle, control of the project was moved from Allard to Andy Lees, who headed the Windows Phone division. The project cost Microsoft US$1 billion and was discontinued on June 30, 2010 due to poor sales.

=== Courier ===
Allard led team at Microsoft that created the two-screen tablet prototype and business plan called Courier. The Courier project did not receive funding by Steve Ballmer, who insisted that the product run Windows and Office. Shortly after Ballmer's decision to cancel development of the Courier, Allard left Microsoft, though said his decision to leave was unrelated to the Courier cancellation.

=== Retirement from Microsoft ===
On May 25, 2010, Allard left Microsoft. Upon announcing his retirement, Allard wrote an internal email named "Decide. Change. Reinvent." to Microsoft employees discussing his career history at Microsoft and attempting to instill inspiration to a group of employees at Microsoft he refers to as "The Tribe". According to Allard, "The Tribe" is "a group of people diverse in perspective, similar in skills and completely, totally galvanized around one central purpose. Change."

Before leaving Microsoft, Allard became a director of The Clymb, a Flash sale site featuring outdoor products. In June 2011, The Clymb raised $2 million from a handful of angel investors, including Allard, and was sold to LeftLane Sports in 2016.

Allard joined Intellivision Entertainment on May 14, 2020, as the global managing director to help oversee the release of the Intellivision Amico. As of January 2021, all references to Intellivision Entertainment and J. Allard's time there have been removed from his LinkedIn page with no announcement or further information. As of March 2021, all references related to Allard's involvement with Intellivision have now been removed from Intellivision's website and related Intellivision Amico webpages. In an interview posted on GeekWire, Allard says that he left the company last summer, shortly after joining, stating that there was "No drama, just not a good fit". This statement from Allard seems to directly contradict Intellivision Entertainment chief executive officer Tommy Tallarico, who said as recently as March 2021 that J. Allard is still an advisor.

=== GoFundMe ===
In July 2022, it was announced that Allard would be joining GoFundMe as chief product and technology officer to lead the organization in technology infrastructure, product oversight, design and overseeing engineering teams.

=== Amazon.com ===
In October 2024 Amazon confirmed that Allard had joined its Devices and Services team. In 2025 he was Vice President of Amazon ZeroOne, a special projects team focused on producing new consumer product categories.
