= Legit (2006 TV series) =

Scottish television series

- Genre: Sitcom
- Directed by: Iain Davidson
- Starring: Steven McNicoll; Jordan Young
- Country of origin: Scotland
- Original language: English
- No. of series: 1
- No. of episodes: 6

Production
- Producer: The Comedy Unit
- Camera setup: Multi-camera
- Running time: 30 mins.

Original release
- Network: BBC One Scotland
- Release: 16 September 2006 – 12 October 2007

Legit is a Scottish sitcom produced by The Comedy Unit, written by Robert Florence and Iain Connell and broadcast on BBC One Scotland. The pilot episode aired on 16 September 2006 to much critical acclaim and positive reviews. The first series started on 7 September 2007 with the pilot episode being aired first and then the remaining episodes. The show was shown every Friday night at 9:30pm. In May 2008, the BBC made the decision not to renew the show for a second series. Instead Dear Green Place was renewed.

== Situation and plot ==
Legit is set in and around a fictitious street market, where main characters Sammy Fox and Danny work selling illegal DVDs and pirated computer software. Fox has recently split up with his girlfriend Kelly-Ann and is trying to win her and her children back off her new boyfriend John McCann. Danny is living with his mother and Fox is currently living in their backyard in a caravan until he "wins her back".

== Cast ==
- Sammy Fox (Steven McNicoll): Sammy Fox has recently split up with his girlfriend and wants her and her children back but John McCann—her new boyfriend—is standing in the way. He lives in Danny's back garden in a caravan until he can get her back. He works in the market alongside Danny.
- Danny (Jordan Young): Cocky and always on the lookout for a girl, Danny still lives with his mother. He works in the market alongside Fox selling illegal DVDs and knows how to get anything he needs from there. In contrast to Sammy who is very self-conscious about his body, Danny is something of an exhibitionist.
- May (Clare Grogan): Danny's mother, has a thing for Fox.
- John McCann (George Drennan): The subject of Fox's jealously, he enjoys the competition between him and Fox over Kelly-Ann who is his girlfriend. He is better than Fox at almost everything, much to Fox's constant dismay.
- Happy Boab (Raymond Mearns): A fellow market trader, Boab is always happy and optimistic and says "Happy days". As seen in the episode "Night of the Lobster", he is incapable even of pretending to possess any emotion other than constant happiness. He is not very bright and was abused in his childhood.

== Episodes ==
1. "Birthday": When Sammy's son says he wants a monkey for his birthday, Sammy goes to great lengths to obtain one, including posing for an artist and staging a fake robbery at a local zoo.
2. "Manitoba": Danny helps Sammy in an effort to make Kelly-Ann jealous by pairing him up with his cousin, Manitoba—a scheme which backfires spectacularly when her father and a bust of Lionel Richie become involved.
3. "Night of the Lobster": Danny fakes a legendary "lost" horror movie.
4. "The Old Team": Fo is jealous of his old friend making a successful career in comedy stand up and is angry that he has made money out of Fox's history. Danny has a rival at the market.
5. "Danny, Champion of the World": Danny is pleased with his mother's new boyfriend (played by James Fleet) and sets out to mould him into the perfect man. Meanwhile, Locatelli (played by Hugh Ross), the artist previously seen in "Birthday", hires Fox to install a security system at his house.
6. "Removals": Even the simple task of emptying a deceased woman's house is too much for the hapless Fox and Danny. What starts as loading boxes into a van ends up in kidnapping, cross-dressing and considering the meaning of life. Robert Florence, the writer for the show and star of Consolevania appears in this episode. This episode has a similar set-up to Florence and Connell's subsequent sitcom, Empty.
