= Live Floor Show =

Scottish TV comedy show (2002–2003)

- Genre: Stand-up comedy Sketch comedy
- Presented by: Greg Hemphill; Dara Ó Briain
- Country of origin: Scotland
- Original language: English
- No. of series: 3

Original release
- Network: BBC One Scotland; BBC Two
- Release: 2002 – 2003

Live Floor Show is a television comedy show produced by BBC Scotland for three series from 2002 to 2003. The first two series, hosted by Greg Hemphill, were broadcast on BBC One Scotland. The third series, hosted by Dara Ó Briain, was shown on BBC Two.

The programme featured a number of regular acts on one of the three stages at the Queen Margaret Drive studios in Glasgow: Frankie Boyle, Al Murray, Craig Hill, Paul Sneddon, Miles Jupp, and Jim Muir. The show also featured many other well-known guest acts: Bill Bailey, Doug Stanhope, Mackenzie Crook, Des McLean, Des Clarke, Craig Charles, Dan Antopolski, Jo Brand, and Matt Blaize.

At the end of each show there was a musical act. One notable appearance was by Robert Plant, on the same night as Bill Bailey.
