= The Comedy Unit =

Scottish entertainment company

The Comedy Unit Ltd.
- Type: Subsidiary
- Industry: Television
- Founded: 1983; 43 years ago
- Founder: Colin Gilbert
- Headquarters: Glasgow, Scotland
- Owner: BBC (1983–1996); RDF Media Group (2006–2010); Zodiak Media (2010–2016); Banijay Entertainment (2010–2026; 2026–present)
- Parent: Banijay UK (2020–present)
- Website: www.comedyunit.co.uk

The Comedy Unit Ltd., also known sometimes as just Comedy Unit, is a Scottish company that produces sitcoms, comedy sketches, live shows and other comedy productions. It began life as an in-house BBC department in 1983 under the auspices of Producer Colin Gilbert and became an independent production company in 1996 when Gilbert and business manager April Chamberlain left the BBC. By 2001 they had an annual turnover of £2 million a core staff of 12 employees. They have produced radio and television shows that were aired on BBC Scotland and BBC Radio Scotland.

It was bought by London-based RDF Media Group in 2006 which in turn was acquired by Paris-based Zodiak Entertainment Group in 2010. The creators of Still Game, Ford Kiernan and Greg Hemphill, terminated their connections with the expanded group although the show itself continued as a co-production. Zodiak was in turn acquired by the Banijay Group in 2016.

== Productions ==
- Laugh??? I Nearly Paid My Licence Fee (1984)
- City Lights (1984–1991)
- Naked Video (1986–1991)
- Rab C. Nesbitt (1988–1999, 2008–2014)
- Only an Excuse? (1993–2020)
- The Baldy Man (1995–1997)
- Atletico Partick (1996)
- Chewin' the Fat (1998–2002)
- Caledonian Macbrains (2001)
- Still Game (2002–2019)
- The Karen Dunbar Show (2003–2006)
- Offside (2004–2007)
- Legit (2006–2008)
- Having it All (2007)
- Fags, Mags and Bags (2007–2016)
- Empty (2008)
- Gary: Tank Commander (2009–2012)
- Limmy's Show (2009–2013)
- Frankie Boyle's Tramadol Nights (2010)
- Mordrin McDonald: 21st Century Wizard (2010–2012)
- Burnistoun (2009–2019)
- Badults (2013–2014)
- Scot Squad (2014–2023)
- Soft Border Patrol (2018–2020)
- Tourist Trap (2018–2019)
