= British Independent Film Award for Best Screenplay =

- Awarded for: Best Screenplay
- Country: United Kingdom
- Presented by: BIFA
- Currently held by: Santosh – Sandhya Suri (2024)
- Website: www.bifa.org.uk

The British Independent Film Award for Best Screenplay is an annual award given by the British Independent Film Awards (BIFA) to recognize the best screenplay in a British independent film. The award was first presented in the 1998 ceremony with Paul Laverty being the first recipient of this award for his work in Ken Loach's My Name is Joe.

Steven Knight, Armando Iannucci and Simon Blackwell are the only nominees who have received this award more than once with two wins each while Paul Laverty has received the most nominations for this category with six followed by Lynne Ramsay with four.

== Winners and nominees ==
=== 1990s ===
Year	Film	Recipient(s)
1998 (1st)	My Name is Joe	Paul Laverty
1998 (1st)	Lock, Stock and Two Smoking Barrels	Guy Ritchie
1998 (1st)	My Son the Fanatic	Hanif Kureishi
1998 (1st)	Nil by Mouth	Gary Oldman
1998 (1st)	Orphans	Peter Mullan
1999 (2nd)	East Is East	Ayub Khan-Din
1999 (2nd)	Beautiful People	Jasmin Dizdar
1999 (2nd)	Ratcatcher	Lynne Ramsay
1999 (2nd)	A Room for Romeo Brass	Paul Fraser and Shane Meadows
1999 (2nd)	This Year's Love	David Kane

=== 2000s ===
Year	Film	Recipient(s)
2000 (3rd)	Billy Elliot	Lee Hall
2000 (3rd)	Gangster No. 1	Johnny Ferguson
2000 (3rd)	Last Resort	Rowan Joffé and Paweł Pawlikowski
2000 (3rd)	Purely Belter	Mark Herman
2000 (3rd)	Saving Grace	Craig Ferguson and Mark Crowdey
2001 (4th)	Sexy Beast	Louis Mellis, David Scinto
2001 (4th)	Bread and Roses	Paul Laverty
2001 (4th)	The Claim	Frank Cottrell Boyce
2001 (4th)	Jump Tomorrow	Joel Hopkins
2002 (5th)	Lawless Heart	Tom Hunsinger and Neil Hunter
2002 (5th)	Bloody Sunday	Paul Greengrass
2002 (5th)	Morvern Callar	Lynne Ramsay and Liana Dognini
2002 (5th)	Sweet Sixteen	Paul Laverty
2003 (6th)	Dirty Pretty Things	Steven Knight
2003 (6th)	Buffalo Soldiers	Gregor Jordan, Eric Weiss and Nora Maccoby
2003 (6th)	Calendar Girls	Tim Firth and Juliette Towhidi
2003 (6th)	The Magdalene Sisters	Peter Mullan
2003 (6th)	Wilbur Wants to Kill Himself	Anders Thomas Jensen and Lone Scherfig
2004 (7th)	Shaun of the Dead	Edgar Wright and Simon Pegg
2004 (7th)	Ae Fond Kiss...	Paul Laverty
2004 (7th)	Dead Man's Shoes	Paddy Considine and Shane Meadows
2004 (7th)	The Life and Death of Peter Sellers	Christopher Markus and Stephen McFeely
2004 (7th)	Vera Drake	Mike Leigh
2005 (8th)	Millions	Frank Cottrell Boyce
2005 (8th)	A Cock and Bull Story	Martin Hardy
2005 (8th)	The Constant Gardener	Jeffrey Caine
2005 (8th)	Kinky Boots	Tim Firth and Geoff Deane
2005 (8th)	Mrs Henderson Presents	Martin Sherman
2006 (9th)	The Queen	Peter Morgan
2006 (9th)	The History Boys	Alan Bennet
2006 (9th)	The Last King of Scotland	Jeremy Brock and Peter Morgan
2006 (9th)	This Is England	Shane Meadows
2006 (9th)	Venus	Hanif Kureishi
2007 (10th)	Notes on a Scandal	Patrick Marber
2007 (10th)	And When Did You Last See Your Father?	David Nicholls
2007 (10th)	Control	Matt Greenhalgh
2007 (10th)	Eastern Promises	Steven Knight
2007 (10th)	Hallam Foe	David Mackenzie and Ed Whitmore
2008 (11th)	In Bruges	Martin McDonagh
2008 (11th)	Hunger	Enda Walsh and Steve McQueen
2008 (11th)	Slumdog Millionaire	Simon Beaufoy
2008 (11th)	Somers Town	Paul Fraser
2008 (11th)	Son of Rambow	Garth Jennings
2009 (12th)	In the Loop	Armando Iannucci, Jesse Armstrong, Simon Blackwell and Tony Roche
2009 (12th)	An Education	Nick Hornby
2009 (12th)	Fish Tank	Andrea Arnold
2009 (12th)	Moon	Nathan Parker
2009 (12th)	Nowhere Boy	Matt Greenhalgh

=== 2010s ===
Year	Film	Recipient(s)
2010 (13th)	The King's Speech	David Seidler
2010 (13th)	Four Lions	Jesse Armstrong
2010 (13th)	Kick-Ass	Jane Goldman
2010 (13th)	Made in Dagenham	William Ivory
2010 (13th)	Never Let Me Go	Alex Garland
2011 (14th)	Submarine	Richard Ayoade
2011 (14th)	The Guard	John Michael McDonagh
2011 (14th)	Kill List	Ben Wheatley
2011 (14th)	Shame	Steve McQueen and Abi Morgan
2011 (14th)	We Need to Talk About Kevin	Lynne Ramsay and Rory Stewart Kinnear
2012 (15th)	Sightseers	Alice Lowe, Steve Oram and Amy Jump
2012 (15th)	Berberian Sound Studio	Peter Strickland
2012 (15th)	Broken	Mark O'Rowe
2012 (15th)	The Iron Lady	Abi Morgan
2012 (15th)	Song for Marion	Paul Andrew Williams
2013 (16th)	Locke	Steven Knight
2013 (16th)	Le Week-End	Hanif Kureishi
2013 (16th)	Philomena	Jeff Pope and Steve Coogan
2013 (16th)	The Selfish Giant	Clio Barnard
2013 (16th)	Starred Up	Jonathan Asser
2014 (17th)	Frank	Jon Ronson, Peter Straughan
2014 (17th)	'71	Gregory Burke
2014 (17th)	Calvary	John Michael McDonagh
2014 (17th)	The Imitation Game	Graham Moore
2014 (17th)	Pride	Stephen Beresford
2015 (18th)	Ex Machina	Alex Garland
2015 (18th)	45 Years	Andrew Haigh
2015 (18th)	Brooklyn	Nick Hornby
2015 (18th)	High-Rise	Amy Jump
2015 (18th)	The Lobster	Yorgos Lanthimos and Efthimis Filippou
2016 (19th)	Under the Shadow	Babak Anvari
2016 (19th)	Adult Life Skills	Rachel Tunnard
2016 (19th)	American Honey	Andrea Arnold
2016 (19th)	I Am Not a Serial Killer	Christopher Hyde and Billy O'Brien
2016 (19th)	I, Daniel Blake	Paul Laverty
2017 (20th)	Lady Macbeth	Alice Birch
2017 (20th)	The Death of Stalin	Armando Iannucci, David Schneider and Ian Martin
2017 (20th)	God's Own Country	Francis Lee
2017 (20th)	I Am Not a Witch	Rungano Nyoni
2017 (20th)	Three Billboards Outside Ebbing, Missouri	Martin McDonagh
2018 (21st)	The Favourite	Deborah Davis and Tony McNamara
2018 (21st)	American Animals	Bart Layton
2018 (21st)	Beast	Michael Pearce
2018 (21st)	Disobedience	Sebastián Lelio and Rebecca Lenkiewicz
2018 (21st)	You Were Never Really Here	Lynne Ramsay
2019 (22nd)	The Personal History of David Copperfield	Armando Iannucci and Simon Blackwell
2019 (22nd)	In Fabric	Peter Strickland
2019 (22nd)	Sorry We Missed You	Paul Laverty
2019 (22nd)	The Souvenir	Joanna Hogg
2019 (22nd)	Wild Rose	Nicole Taylor

=== 2020s ===
Year	Film	Recipient(s)
2020 (23rd)	The Father	Florian Zeller and Christopher Hampton
2020 (23rd)	His House	Remi Weekes
2020 (23rd)	Mogul Mowgli	Bassam Tariq and Riz Ahmed
2020 (23rd)	Rocks	Theresa Ikoko and Claire Wilson
2020 (23rd)	Saint Maud	Rose Glass
2021 (24th)	After Love	Aleem Khan
2021 (24th)	Ali & Ava	Clio Barnard
2021 (24th)	Benediction	Terence Davis
2021 (24th)	The Nest	Sean Durkin
2021 (24th)	The Souvenir Part II	Joanna Hogg
2022 (25th)	Aftersun	Charlotte Wells
2022 (25th)	Blue Jean	Georgia Oakley
2022 (25th)	Good Luck to You, Leo Grande	Katy Brand
2022 (25th)	Living	Kazuo Ishiguro
2022 (25th)	The Wonder	Sebastián Lelio, Alice Birch and Emma Donoghue
2023 (26th)	All of Us Strangers	Andrew Haigh
2023 (26th)	Femme	Sam H. Freeman and Ng Choon Ping
2023 (26th)	How to Have Sex	Molly Manning Walker
2023 (26th)	Rye Lane	Nathan Bryon and Tom Melia
2023 (26th)	Scrapper	Charlotte Regan
2024 (27th)	Santosh	Sandhya Suri
2024 (27th)	Kneecap	Rich Peppiatt
2024 (27th)	Love Lies Bleeding	Rose Glass and Weronika Tofilska
2024 (27th)	On Becoming a Guinea Fowl	Rungano Nyoni
2024 (27th)	The Outrun	Nora Fingscheidt and Amy Liptrot
2025 (28th)	The Ballad of Wallis Island	Tom Basden, Tim Key
2025 (28th)	On Falling	Laura Carreira
2025 (28th)	My Father's Shadow	Wale Davies
2025 (28th)	I Swear	Kirk Jones
2025 (28th)	Pillion	Harry Lighton

== Multiple nominations ==
6 nominations

- Paul Laverty

4 nominations

- Lynne Ramsay

3 nominations

- Armando Iannucci
- Steven Knight
- Hanif Kureishi
- Shane Meadows

2 nominations

- Jesse Armstrong
- Andrea Arnold
- Clio Barnard
- Alice Birch
- Simon Blackwell
- Frank Cottrell Boyce
- Tim Firth
- Paul Fraser
- Alex Garland
- Rose Glass
- Matt Greenhalgh
- Andrew Haigh
- Joanna Hogg
- Nick Hornby
- Amy Jump
- Sebastián Lelio
- John Michael McDonagh
- Martin McDonagh
- Steve McQueen
- Abi Morgan
- Peter Morgan
- Peter Mullan
- Peter Strickland

== Multiple wins ==
2 wins

- Simon Blackwell
- Armando Iannucci
- Steven Knight
