= British Independent Film Awards 2002 =

British awards ceremony

5th British Independent Film Awards
- Awarded for: Best in British independent film
- Date: 30 October 2002
- Site: Pacha Nightclub, London
- Hosted by: Johnny Vaughan
- Official website: www.bifa.film

Highlights
- Best Film: Sweet Sixteen
- Most awards: Bloody Sunday, Morvern Callar and Sweet Sixteen (2 each)
- Most nominations: Morvern Callar (7)

The 5th British Independent Film Awards, held on 30 October 2002 at the Pacha Nightclub in Victoria, London honoured the best British independent films of 2002. The award ceremony was hosted by Johnny Vaughan.

As per previous years, only films intended for theatrical release, and those which had a public screening to a paying audience either on general release in the UK or at a British film festival between 1 October 2001 and 30 September 2002 were eligible for consideration. In addition, they needed to have been produced or majority co-produced by a British company, or in receipt of at least 51% of their budget from a British source. Lastly, they could not be solely funded by a single studio.

Shortlists were announced on 18 September 2002 with Lynne Ramsay's psychological drama, Morvern Callar, leading with seven nominations. Winners in eleven categories were selected from the shortlists and a further five were awarded entirely at the jury's discretion, whose make up included Kate Ashfield, Jenne Cassarotto (Agent), Stuart Craig, Richard Gladstein, Robert Jones (Head of the premiere fund/film council), Asif Kapadia, Hamish McAlpine (Metro Tartan Distributors) and Trudie Styler.

The category for Best Original Music was dropped this year as was the award for Producer of the Year. An Award for Outstanding Contribution by an Actor and was created in this year to commemorate the life and work of Richard Harris.

== Winners and nominees ==
Best British Independent Film	Best Director
Sweet Sixteen – Ken Loach; Bend It Like Beckham – Gurinder Chadha; Bloody Sunday – Paul Greengrass; Lawless Heart – Neil Hunter; Morvern Callar – Lynne Ramsay	Paul Greengrass – Bloody Sunday; Ken Loach – Sweet Sixteen; Lynne Ramsay – Morvern Callar; Neil Hunter and Tom Hunsinger – Lawless Heart
Best Actor	Best Actress
James Nesbitt – Bloody Sunday as Ivan Cooper; Bill Nighy – Lawless Heart as Dan; Richard Harris – My Kingdom as "Sandeman"; Timothy Spall – All or Nothing as Phil	Samantha Morton – Morvern Callar as Morvern Callar; Elaine Cassidy – Disco Pigs as Sinéad; Harriet Walter – Villa des Roses as Olive Burrell; Shirley Henderson – Villa des Roses as Ella
Best Screenplay	Most Promising Newcomer
Tom Hunsinger and Neil Hunter – Lawless Heart; Lynne Ramsay and Liana Dognini – Morvern Callar; Paul Greengrass – Bloody Sunday; Paul Laverty – Sweet Sixteen	Martin Compston – Sweet Sixteen as Liam; Kathleen McDermott – Morvern Callar as Lanna; Parminder Nagra – Bend It Like Beckham as Jesminder "Jess" Kaur Bhamra; William Ruane – Sweet Sixteen as Pinball
Best International Independent Film (English Language)	Best International Independent Film (Foreign Language)
Lantana – Ray Lawrence; Ghost World – Terry Zwigoff; Ivans Xtc – Bernard Rose; Lost in La Mancha – Keith Fulton and Louis Pepe	Monsoon Wedding – Mira Nair; Nine Queens – Fabián Bielinsky; Talk to Her – Pedro Almodóvar; Y Tu Mamá También – Alfonso Cuarón
Best Technical Achievement	Best Achievement in Production
Alwin H. Küchler – Morvern Callar (DOP / Cinematography); Ivan Strasburg – Bloody Sunday (Cinematography); Mark Tildesley – Twenty Four Hour Party People (Production Design); Scott Thomas – Lawless Heart (Editing)	24 Hour Party People – Andrew Eaton; Morvern Callar – Robyn Slovo, Charles Pattinson and George Faber; Revengers Tragedy – Margaret Matheson and Tod Davies; Villa des Roses – Dirk Impens and Rudy Verzyck
Douglas Hickox Award (Best Debut Director)	Outstanding Contribution by an Actor
Lindy Heymann and Christian Taylor – Showboy; Duncan Roy – AKA; Kirsten Sheridan – Disco Pigs; Paul Sarossy – Mr In-Between	Richard Harris (awarded posthumously)
The Variety Award	Jury 2002 Award – Most Effective Distribution Campaign
Ewan McGregor	Wendy Strike and Nick Moran for Christie Malry's Own Double-Entry
Special Jury Prize	Lifetime Achievement Award
Brian Tufano	George Harrison (awarded posthumously)

=== Films with multiple nominations ===
Nominations	Film
7	Morvern Callar
5	Bloody Sunday
5	Lawless Heart
5	Sweet Sixteen
3	Villa des Roses
2	Bend It Like Beckham
2	Disco Pigs
2	Twenty Four Hour Party People
