= William Ruane =

Scottish actor

- Born: 7 June 1985 (age 40); Glasgow, Scotland
- Occupation: Actor
- Years active: 2002–present

William Ruane (born 1985) is a Scottish actor. He is best known for his roles in the films Sweet Sixteen (2002) and The Angels' Share (2012), and in the soap opera River City.

== Career ==
Ruane was born in Glasgow and raised in the Castlemilk area of the city, where he attended St Margaret Mary's Secondary School. Whilst still at school and with no previous acting experience, he was selected by director Ken Loach to portray the pivotal character Pinball in the gritty drama Sweet Sixteen set in the Inverclyde area (which has a local dialect virtually identical to that of Glasgow). Pinball, a volatile boy, was the best friend of protagonist Liam, played by fellow newcomer Martin Compston. The film was well received at the 2002 Cannes Film Festival, and Ruane received a British Independent Film Awards 'Most promising newcomer' nomination for his performance. Compston was the winner of the same category and embarked on what would become a successful acting career.

Ruane (along with Sweet Sixteen co-star Annmarie Fulton) was soon able to secure a part in the new BBC Scotland soap opera River City; in early 2004 his character Brian—another troubled teen—was written out to "receive medical treatment" following a storyline involving the abduction of Fulton's character Hazel.

Ruane has worked fairly infrequently as an actor since his early success, and has had several jobs in other industries including a DJ, car salesman and travel agent. In hindsight he admitted that he did not fully appreciate his good fortune at such a young age, and without any drama school training to refer to, he did not prepare for some auditions as professionally as he could have. Loach remained keen, casting him (alongside Compston) in Tickets (2005) and in The Wind That Shakes the Barley (2006). He also appeared in minor roles on several television series.

In 2012 Ruane's career came full circle when he was cast as Rhino in The Angels' Share, another production directed by Ken Loach, written by Paul Laverty, produced by Rebecca O'Brien and set in the west of Scotland, in which he starred alongside a 'raw talent'—in this case Paul Brannigan—and which had positive feedback at Cannes (the 2012 festival). Another of the main cast members, Gary Maitland (also from Castlemilk), had featured in Sweet Sixteen and Tickets as well.

Despite the similar level of success to his breakthrough role a decade earlier, Ruane found that The Angels' Share did not bring an increase in job offers as he had anticipated.

Having already returned briefly in 2009, Ruane reprised his role as Brian on River City in 2016 (his on-screen mother having remained in the series throughout the period).

== Filmography ==
| Year | Title | Role | Notes |
|---|---|---|---|
| 2002 | Sweet Sixteen | Pinball | Loach / Laverty film |
| 2002 | River City | Brian Henderson | TV series |
| 2005 | Tickets | Frank | Loach / Laverty |
| 2006 | Rebus | David Costello | TV series |
| 2006 | The Wind That Shakes the Barley | Johnny Gogan | Loach / Laverty |
| 2006 | Sea of Souls | David | TV series |
| 2010 | Taggart | Fin | TV series |
| 2010 | Accused | Patrick | TV series |
| 2011 | The Field of Blood | DC Colin McGovern | TV series |
| 2011 | The Shadow Line | Stephen | TV series |
| 2011 | Fast Romance | Gordon Boyd | Dir: Carter Ferguson |
| 2012 | Kelly + Victor | Craig | |
| 2012 | The Angels' Share | Rhino | Loach / Laverty |
| 2013 | The Borgias | Papal physician | TV series |
| 2014 | Honour | Big Yin | |
| 2016 | River City | Brian Henderson | TV series |
