= London Film Critics Circle Awards 2002 =

British film awards ceremony

23rd London Film Critics Circle Awards

12 February 2003

Film of the Year:
About Schmidt

British Film of the Year:
All or Nothing

The 23rd London Film Critics Circle Awards, honouring the best in film for 2002, were announced by the London Film Critics Circle on 12 February 2003.

== Winners and nominees ==
=== Film of the Year ===
About Schmidt

- Bowling for Columbine
- Donnie Darko
- Lantana
- Road to Perdition

=== British Film of the Year ===
All or Nothing

- About a Boy
- Sweet Sixteen

=== Foreign Language Film of the Year ===
Y Tu Mamá También • Mexico

- The Son's Room • Italy
- Talk to Her • Spain

=== Director of the Year ===
Phillip Noyce - The Quiet American

- Pedro Almodóvar - Talk to Her
- Peter Jackson - The Lord of the Rings: The Two Towers

=== British Director of the Year ===
Christopher Nolan - Insomnia

- Mike Leigh - All or Nothing
- Sam Mendes - Road to Perdition

=== Screenwriter of the Year ===
Andrew Bovell - Lantana

- Nia Vardalos - My Big Fat Greek Wedding
- David Self - Road to Perdition

=== British Screenwriter of the Year ===
Steven Knight - Dirty Pretty Things

- Mike Leigh - All or Nothing
- Paul Laverty - Sweet Sixteen

=== Actor of the Year ===
Michael Caine - The Quiet American

- Jack Nicholson - About Schmidt
- Al Pacino - Insomnia

=== Actress of the Year ===
Stockard Channing - The Business of Strangers

- Kerry Armstrong - Lantana
- Halle Berry - Monster's Ball

=== British Actor of the Year ===
Hugh Grant - About a Boy

- Chiwetel Ejiofor - Dirty Pretty Things
- Ralph Fiennes - Spider

=== British Actress of the Year ===
Lesley Manville - All or Nothing

- Samantha Morton - Morvern Callar
- Miranda Richardson - Spider

=== British Supporting Actor of the Year ===
Kenneth Branagh - Harry Potter and the Chamber of Secrets

- Paul Bettany - A Beautiful Mind
- Jude Law - Road to Perdition

=== British Supporting Actress of the Year ===
Emily Watson - Red Dragon

- Shirley Henderson - 24 Hour Party People
- Ruth Sheen - All or Nothing

=== British Newcomer of the Year ===
Martin Compston - Sweet Sixteen
Keira Knightley - Bend It Like Beckham

- Asif Kapadia - The Warrior

=== Dilys Powell Award ===
- Lewis Gilbert
