= Stephen Purdon =

Scottish actor (born 1983)

- Born: May 1983 (age 43); Greenock, Inverclyde, Scotland
- Occupation: Actor
- Years active: 1999–present
- Television: River City
- Spouse: Nicola McLaughlin (m. 2011)
- Children: 2

Stephen Purdon (born May 1983) is a Scottish actor, known for his role as Bob O'Hara in the BBC Scotland soap opera River City. Having portrayed the role from its first episode, Purdon is the longest-serving Scottish soap opera actor.

== Life and career ==
Purdon was born in May 1983 in Greenock, Inverclyde. A teenage Purdon made his screen debut in 1999, as an extra in Ratcatcher. He then appeared in the 2002 film Sweet Sixteen. He was up against Martin Compston for the lead role, but as Compston was chosen, Purdon was given a minor role in the film.

Whilst studying at Langside College, he was contacted by a casting director who informed him of a new Scottish soap opera being made for the BBC, River City. He auditioned for the part of Shellsuit Bob, which he initially believed was a joke and was disappointed to hear nothing for a while. Then, whilst working in a clothing shop in his local area, he received a call to inform him he had gotten the part of Bob O'Hara. Purdon told his manager he was quitting, but asked him to reserve the job in case River City did not work out. He began filming for the show, aged 19. Since joining River City, Purdon has made annual appearances in pantomimes in Glasgow, notably at the Pavilion Theatre. In 2019, he portrayed Scottish boxer Benny Lynch in Rally Roon the Rangers at the Pavilion. Purdon has been married to wife Nicola McLaughlin since 2011, with whom he shares two children.

Stephen Purdon now presents The Breakfast Show on Go Radio with Zoe Kelly, taking over from his River City colleague Grado.

== Filmography ==
Year	Title	Role	Notes
1999	Ratcatcher	Boy on Bike	Film
2002	Sweet Sixteen	Mugger	Film
2002–2026	River City	Bob O'Hara	Regular role
2012	Staked	Mark	Television film
2014	I.Q You	Joe	Film
2018	Cops and Monsters	Private Colin Jack Bissitt	Episode: "Remembrance"
