= David Goodall =

David Goodall may refer to:

- David Goodall (botanist) (1914–2018), Australian botanist, ecologist, and advocate of legalized voluntary euthanasia
- David Goodall (diplomat) (1931–2016), British diplomat
- David Goodall (director) (1964–2023), Scottish film director, producer and actor
- David Goodall (chemist), British chemist, professor emeritus at University of York
