= John Henshaw =

English actor

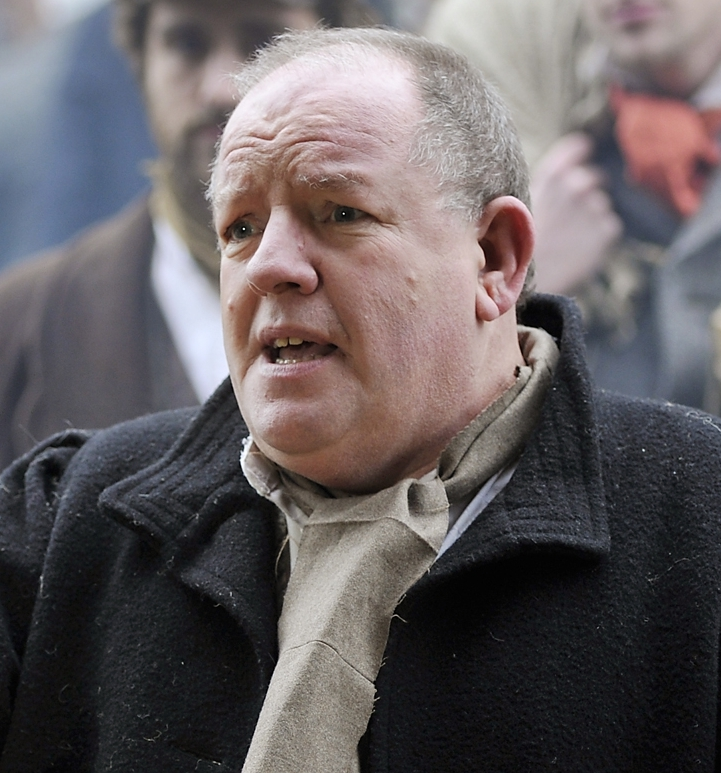
- Henshaw in 2011
- Born: John Joseph Henshaw; 1951 (age 74–75); Ancoats, Manchester, Lancashire, England
- Occupation: Actor

John Joseph Henshaw is an English actor, best known for his roles as Ken Dixon the landlord in Early Doors, Wilf Bradshaw in Born and Bred and PC Roy Bramwell in The Cops. Often associated with characters who are "hard men", he played John Prescott in the 2007 ITV drama Confessions of a Diary Secretary.

== Early life ==
One of 12 siblings, he grew up in Ancoats, Manchester's "Little Italy" community. He was a binman for ten years before deciding, at the age of 40, to become an actor.

== Acting career ==
His first big break in acting was as a minder to Robert Lindsay's character Michael Murray in the acclaimed Channel 4 series G.B.H.. He had roles in the Steve Coogan film The Parole Officer and in the BBC Three sitcom The Visit, first shown in July 2007. In 2002 he appeared in the Scottish Gaelic drama Anna Bheag (Wee Anna), although not as a Gaelic-speaking character.

Other credits include Nice Guy Eddie, When Saturday Comes plus appearances in The Royle Family, Last of the Summer Wine, Life on Mars and the comedy series Early Doors. In September 2007, at the Lowry in Salford, he starred in the world premier of the play King Cotton.

He played the role of Ken, the deputy manager in the Post Office adverts, in 2007 and 2008. March 2008 saw Henshaw return to the Manchester area playing the lead in Jim Cartwright's play Road at the Octagon Theatre in Bolton. Summer 2009 saw Henshaw play Meatballs in the film Looking for Eric, directed by Ken Loach and starring Eric Cantona. The character was a workmate and friend of the lead character Eric Bishop played by Steve Evets. In 2008, he played Albert Ross in "The Heart of a Man", the 12th episode of the 17th series of Heartbeat.

In 2010, he played Mr Pony in Terry Pratchett's Going Postal and in 2011 he portrayed the character of John Holt, one of the original founding fathers of the Co-operative movement, in a feature film The Rochdale Pioneers. In 2012, he appeared in Downton Abbey as shopkeeper Jos Tufton. In 2013, he played Arthur Potts in Series 15 Episode 5 ("The Sicilian Defence") of Midsomer Murders. He also played the role of Harry, a mentor and friend to the main character, in Ken Loach's 2012 Scottish comedy-drama The Angels' Share and Danny in Chris Shepherd's 2013 film The Ringer.

In 2013, he played Stan Bond in By Any Means and in 2014 played the judge in Closer to the Moon. In 2015, he played Murphy in "Charlie's Plan", directed by John McCormack.

In 2017, he appeared in the BBC series Father Brown as Barney Butterfield in episode 5.12, "The Theatre of the Invisible", and returned to playing Ken the landlord in the Early Doors stage show.

He had a small role in the 2018 film Stan & Ollie as Nobby Cook, a British comedian who briefly stands in for Oliver Hardy when Hardy is taken ill.

He also appeared as Disco Des in the 10,000th episode of Coronation Street.

== Personal life ==
Henshaw was director of the 24:7 Theatre Festival, an annual festival of new writing for theatre based in Manchester, which started in 2004.

Henshaw is also a patron of the Ancoats Dispensary Trust which campaigns to save and restore for community use the Grade II listed Ancoats Dispensary close to his birthplace.
