= St Gerard's Roman Catholic Secondary School, Govan =

St Gerard's RC Secondary School

Location
- 80 Vicarfield Street; Glasgow, G51 2DF; Scotland; 55.860137°N 4.306310°W

Information
- Religious affiliation: Roman Catholic
- Established: 1937
- Closed: 1998

St Gerard's RC Secondary was a secondary school in Govan, Glasgow, Scotland, formerly known as St Gerard's Senior Secondary School.

The school took pupils from a number of areas designated by Strathclyde Region as being a priority in terms of social deprivation. It was quoted in 1991 that almost 50 per cent of pupils were entitled to free school meals.

== History ==
In the 1960s, the school became a comprehensive. An attempt was made by Glasgow District Council to close the school in 1993, along with a number of other schools in the city. A joint action group representing the parents of the various schools was formed, and they put forward a request for the school to be opted-out of local authority control within the terms of the Self Governing Schools (Scotland) Act 1989 which was then in force.

The dispute surrounding the closure and the use of the opt-out legislation went to the House of Lords, where it was ruled that Strathclyde region had acted unlawfully when the councillors voted to close St. Gerards after a ballot for the opt-out had been called. The campaign by the joint action group was successful in keeping the school open for at least a few more years.

The school was finally closed in 1998 as part of a Glasgow City Council plan which included the closure of seven secondary schools in the city, including five denominational Catholic schools. Pupils moved to Lourdes Secondary School in Cardonald. This proposal was publicly criticised by Cardinal Thomas Winning as sacrificing the needs of the children in the Catholic community for the sake of short-term financial gain.

== Former pupils ==
- Billy Connolly
- Trish Godman
- Roderick Wright
- Joe McBride
- Jim Craig
- Johnny Quigley
- Harry Haddock
- Johnny Beattie
- Jimmy Dewar
