= Tickets (film) =

- Directed by: Ermanno Olmi, Abbas Kiarostami and Ken Loach
- Written by: Ermanno Olmi, Abbas Kiarostami and Paul Laverty
- Produced by: Carlo Cresto-Dina, Babak Karimi, Rebecca O'Brien, Domenico Procacci
- Starring: Carlo Delle Piane, Valeria Bruni Tedeschi, Silvana De Santis, Filippo Trojano, Gary Maitland, William Ruane
- Music by: George Fenton
- Release date: 2005
- Running time: 112 minutes
- Languages: Italian, English, Albanian, German

Tickets is a 2005 comedy-drama anthology film directed by Ermanno Olmi, Abbas Kiarostami and Ken Loach. It was written by Ermanno Olmi, Abbas Kiarostami, and Paul Laverty. Three interconnected stories unfold on a train journey from Innsbruck to Rome.

== Cast ==
- Carlo Delle Piane
- Valeria Bruni Tedeschi
- Silvana De Santis
- Filippo Trojano
- Gary Maitland
- William Ruane

== Home media ==
The film was released on DVD by Artificial Eye for region 2. The extras feature the original theatrical trailer, behind the scenes footage, director and cast interviews, production notes and filmographies.

== See also ==
- List of Iranian films
