= Jenni Keenan Green =

Scottish actress

Jenni Keenan Green is a British actress from Paisley, Scotland.

== Filmography ==
Film

Year	Work	Role	Notes
1999	My Life So Far	Caroline	
2002	Guys & Dolls	Sally	Short
2020	The Punishment	Claire	Short
2023	Tetris	Jo	
2023	Girl	Ms. Seample	

Television

Year	Work	Role	Notes
1996	Grange Hill	Eilidh	Series 19; 2 episodes
2002	Fran's People	Sandie Sommerville	
2003	Monarch of the Glen	Helen MacIntyre	Episode 5.3
2005	Sea of Souls	Caroline Gregory	Episode 2.3 "Omen, Part 1"; Episode 2.4 "Omen, Part 2"
2005	Holby City	Denise Brennan	Episode 7.49 "Family Planning"
2002-2008	River City	Heather Bellshaw	
2009	Doctors	Beverley Kitt	Episode 11.37 "Beating Around the Bush"
2010	Single Father	Michelle	Miniseries
2011	Doctors	Fiona Kellor	Episode 13.88 "The Grocer's Apostrophe"; Episode 13.90 "Dirty Linen"
2012	Casualty	Vonnie Jessup	Episode 26.20 "Hero Syndrome"
2013	Bob Servant Independent	TV producer	
2015	World's End	Moira Campbell	Regular role
2019	Trust Me	Grace	
2019	Shetland	Claire McGuire	
2021	Murder Island	Isobel	
2023	Doctors	Diana Gray	Episode: "Monstrous Regimen of Women"
