= Bloody Sunday (film) =

2002 film directed by Paul Greengrass

- Theatrical release poster
- Directed by: Paul Greengrass
- Screenplay by: Paul Greengrass
- Based on: Eyewitness Bloody Sunday by Don Mullan
- Produced by: Mark Redhead; Don Mullan (co-producer)
- Starring: James Nesbitt; Tim Pigott-Smith; Nicholas Farrell; Gerard McSorley; Kathy Kiera Clarke
- Cinematography: Ivan Strasburg
- Edited by: Clare Douglas
- Music by: Dominic Muldowney
- Production companies: Bórd Scannán na hÉireann; Granada Television; Hell's Kitchen Films; Irish Film Board (funding); Portman Entertainment Group
- Distributed by: Feature Film Company
- Release dates: 16 January 2002 (Sundance); 25 January 2002 (UK)
- Running time: 111 minutes
- Countries: United Kingdom; Ireland
- Language: English
- Budget: £2,000,000
- Box office: £482,117

Bloody Sunday is a 2002 docudrama film written and directed by Paul Greengrass based around the 1972 "Bloody Sunday" shootings in Derry, Northern Ireland. Although produced by Granada Television as a TV film, it premiered at the Sundance Film Festival on 16 January, a few days before its screening on ITV on 20 January, and then in selected London cinemas from 25 January.

Bloody Sunday is an international co-production of the United Kingdom and Ireland. Though set in Derry, the film was mostly shot in Ballymun in North Dublin. Some location scenes were shot in Derry, in Guildhall Square and in Creggan on the actual route of the march in 1972.

== Content ==
The film was inspired by Don Mullan's politically influential book Eyewitness Bloody Sunday (Wolfhound Press, 1997). The drama shows the events of the day through the eyes of Ivan Cooper, an SDLP Member of the Parliament of Northern Ireland who was a central organiser of the Northern Ireland Civil Rights Association march in Derry on 30 January 1972. The march ended when British Army paratroopers fired on the demonstrators, killing thirteen and wounding another who died four and a half months later. In addition to the deaths, fourteen other people were wounded.

A live version of "Sunday Bloody Sunday" by U2 plays over the closing credits, being this the only musical arrangement of the film.

== Casting and production ==
Cooper is played by James Nesbitt, himself a Protestant from Northern Ireland. In recognition of the role his book played in achieving the new Bloody Sunday Inquiry, his book's role as inspiration for the movie, and the fact that he was a schoolboy witness to the tragedy, Don Mullan was asked by director Paul Greengrass to appear in the film as a Bogside Priest. A number of the military characters were played by ex-members of the British Army, including Simon Mann. Gerry Donaghy was played by Declan Duddy, nephew of Jackie Duddy, one of those killed on Bloody Sunday. Big Brother 2007 housemate Seány O'Kane was also in the film.

== Notable actors ==
- James Nesbitt as Ivan Cooper
- Tim Pigott-Smith as Major General Robert Ford
- Nicholas Farrell as Brigadier Patrick Maclellan
- Gerard McSorley as Chief Supt. Lagan
- Kathy Kiera Clarke as Frances Cooper
- Allan Gildea as Kevin McCorry
- Gerard Crossan as Eamonn McCann
- Simon Mann as Col Derek Wilford
- Mary Moulds as Bernadette Devlin
- Carmel McCallion as Bridget Bond
- David Clayton Rogers as Dennis

== Reception ==
The film was critically acclaimed. It won the Audience Award at Sundance and the Golden Bear at the Berlin International Film Festival (tied with Spirited Away), in addition to the Hitchcock d'Or best film prize at the Dinard Festival of British Cinema.

Bloody Sunday appeared a week before Jimmy McGovern's TV film on the same subject, entitled Sunday (shown by Channel 4). McGovern subsequently criticised Greengrass's film for concentrating on the leadership of the march, and not the perspective of those who joined it.

It holds a 92% approval rating on aggregate review site Rotten Tomatoes, based on 102 collected reviews, with an average score of 7.9/10. The site's consensus reads: "Bloody Sunday powerfully recreates the events of that day with startling immediacy." Metacritic, which uses a weighted average, assigned the film a score of 90 out of 100 based on 31 critics, indicating "universal acclaim".

=== Accolades ===
Year	Award	Category	Nominee	Result	Ref.
2002	Berlin International Film Festival	Golden Bear	Paul Greengrass	Won	
2002	Berlin International Film Festival	Prize of the Ecumenical Jury	Paul Greengrass	Won	
2002	British Independent Film Awards	Best British Independent Film	Bloody Sunday	Nominated	
2002	British Independent Film Awards	Best Director	Paul Greengrass	Nominated	
2002	British Independent Film Awards	Best Actor	James Nesbitt	Won	
2002	British Independent Film Awards	Best Screenplay	Paul Greengrass	Nominated	
2002	British Independent Film Awards	Best Technical Achievement	Ivan Strasburg	Nominated	
2002	European Film Awards	Best Film	Bloody Sunday	Nominated	
2002	European Film Awards	EFA People's Choice Award - Best Director	Paul Greengrass	Nominated	
2002	European Film Awards	Best Screenwriter	Paul Greengrass	Nominated	
2002	European Film Awards	Best Cinematographer	Ivan Strasburg	Nominated	
2002	Independent Spirit Awards	Best International Film	Bloody Sunday	Nominated	
2002	IFTA Film & Drama Awards	Best Feature Film	Bloody Sunday	Won	
2002	IFTA Film & Drama Awards	Best Director – Film	Paul Greengrass	Won	
2002	IFTA Film & Drama Awards	Best Actor – Film	James Nesbitt	Nominated	
2002	IFTA Film & Drama Awards	Best Actress – Film	Kathy Kiera Clarke	Nominated	
2002	IFTA Film & Drama Awards	Best Script	Paul Greengrass	Won	
2002	IFTA Film & Drama Awards	Best Photography	Ivan Strasburg	Nominated	
2002	IFTA Film & Drama Awards	Best Editing	Clare Douglas	Nominated	
2002	IFTA Film & Drama Awards	Best Sound	Albert Bailey	Won	
2002	Sundance Film Festival	World Cinema Audience Award	Bloody Sunday	Won	
2003	British Academy Television Awards	Best Single Drama	Mark Redhead, Paul Greengrass	Nominated	
2003	British Academy Television Awards	Best Actor	James Nesbitt	Nominated	
2003	British Academy Television Craft Awards	Best Editing: Fiction/Entertainment	Clare Douglas	Nominated	
2003	British Academy Television Craft Awards	Best Photography and Lighting: Fiction	Ivan Strasburg	Won	
2003	British Academy Television Craft Awards	Best Sound: Entertainment	Sound Team	Nominated	
2003	Royal Television Society Programme Awards	Serials and Single Drama	Bloody Sunday	Nominated	
2003	Royal Television Society Programme Awards	Writing	Paul Greengrass	Nominated	
