= Looking for Eric =

2009 film by Ken Loach

- Theatrical release poster
- Directed by: Ken Loach
- Screenplay by: Paul Laverty
- Story by: Paul Laverty
- Produced by: Rebecca O'Brien
- Starring: Steve Evets; Eric Cantona; John Henshaw; Stephanie Bishop
- Cinematography: Barry Ackroyd
- Edited by: Jonathan Morris
- Music by: George Fenton
- Production companies: Sixteen Films; Canto Bros. Productions; Why Not Productions
- Distributed by: Diaphana Distribution (France); Icon Film Distribution (United Kingdom)
- Release dates: 18 May 2009 (Cannes); 27 May 2009 (France); 12 June 2009 (United Kingdom)
- Running time: 116 minutes
- Countries: United Kingdom; France; Italy; Belgium; Spain
- Languages: English; French
- Box office: $11.6 million

Looking for Eric is a 2009 sports comedy-drama film directed by Ken Loach and written by Paul Laverty. It is an international co-production between the United Kingdom, France, Italy, Belgium, and Spain. It stars Steve Evets, Eric Cantona, John Henshaw, and Stephanie Bishop. It follows a middle-aged postman who, working for the Manchester sorting office, is going through a dreadful crisis.

The film had its world premiere at the 62nd Cannes Film Festival on 18 May 2009, where it was awarded the Prize of the Ecumenical Jury. It was theatrically released in France on 27 May 2009, by Diaphana Distribution, and in the United Kingdom on 12 June 2009, by Icon Film Distribution. It received positive reviews from critics and grossed over $11.6 million worldwide. For their performances, Henshaw won Best Supporting Actor at the 12th British Independent Film Awards and Evets was nominated for Best Actor at the 22nd European Film Awards.

== Plot ==
Eric Bishop is a football fanatic postman whose life is descending into crisis. Looking after his granddaughter is bringing him into contact with his ex-wife, Lily, whom he abandoned after the birth of their daughter. At the same time, his stepson Ryan is hiding a gun under the floorboards of his bedroom for a violent drugs baron.

At his lowest moments, Bishop considers suicide. But after a short meditation session with fellow postmen in his living room, and smoking cannabis stolen from his stepson, hallucinations bring forth his footballing hero, the famously philosophical Eric Cantona, who gives him advice. His relationship with Lily improves dramatically. Bishop finds the gun and confronts his stepson.

Ryan admits to his involvement with the drugs gang, and Bishop attempts to return the gun to the gangster. He is forced to keep it himself, however, when a Rottweiler is set on him in his car. The gangster then posts footage on YouTube of Bishop's humiliation. The entire family is then arrested by the police on a tip-off but they fail to find the gun as it is hidden in the fridge, inside a frozen chicken.

Eric Cantona then advises Bishop to seek help from his friends and to 'surprise' himself. Bishop organises 'Operation Cantona', sneaking dozens of fellow Manchester United fans – wearing Cantona masks (including Cantona himself) – into the gangster's house and humiliating him and his family, threatening to put the video of their operation onto YouTube, in turn. The film ends at Bishop's daughter's graduation day, where the family reunites in peace.

== Cast ==
- Steve Evets as Eric Bishop
- Eric Cantona as himself
- Stephanie Bishop as Lily
- Gerard Kearns as Ryan
- Stefan Gumbs as Jess
- Lucy-Jo Hudson as Sam
- Cole and Dylan Williams as Daisy
- Matthew McNulty as Young Eric
- Laura Ainsworth as Young Lily
- Max Beesley as Eric's Father
- Kelly Bowland as Ryan's Girlfriend
- Julie Brown as Nurse
- John Henshaw as Meatballs
- Justin Moorhouse as Spleen
- Des Sharples as Jack
- Ian Littler (extra)
- Steven Cherry (extra)

== Production ==
The film was shot on location in Greater Manchester by Loach's company Sixteen Films.

== Release ==
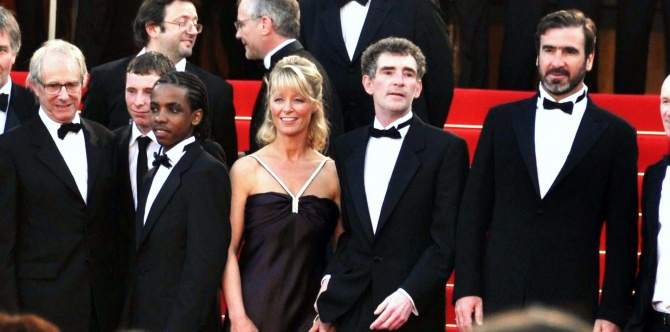
The film's cast and crew at the 2009 Cannes Film Festival.

The film competed in the main competition at the 62nd Cannes Film Festival. It had its UK premiere on 1 June in Lowry Outlet Mall in Salford Quays, attended by Eric Cantona, and was the gala presentation at the opening night of the Sydney Film Festival on 3 June.

The film was released in the United Kingdom and Ireland on 12 June. The film was scheduled to be shown at the Melbourne International Film Festival, but five days before opening night Loach withdrew it because the film festival was "in receipt of financial support from the State of Israel".

== Screenplay ==
The book for Looking For Eric is published by Route Publishing. It includes the full screenplay, extra scenes, colour photographs from the film and on set, and introductions from Paul Laverty, Ken Loach, Eric Cantona and production notes from the cast and crew.

== Reception ==
=== Box office ===
Looking for Eric grossed $55,804 in the United States and Canada, and $11,594,922 in other territories, for a worldwide total of $11,650,726.

=== Critical response ===
On the review aggregator website Rotten Tomatoes, 84% of 102 critics' reviews are positive, with an average rating of 7.1/10. The website's consensus reads: "Ken Loach's latest is an uplifting, entertaining and amusing socio-drama featuring a match-winning performance from Eric Cantona." Metacritic, which uses a weighted average, assigned the film a score of 66 out of 100, based on 23 critics, indicating "generally favorable" reviews.

Peter Bradshaw of The Guardian gave the film 3 out of 5 stars, and described it as "a wacky if erratic and self-conscious buddy movie." Bradshaw also commented, "Looking For Eric isn't a Loach masterpiece, but it's great fun and is set fair to be his first commercial smash since Kes. No one would begrudge him a well-earned box-office hit from such an amiable film."

Jason Solomons of The Observer opined that Looking For Eric "is a strange movie, a film of two halves, one where the bantering comedy of the male workplace mixes with the serious issues of inner-city gun crime. But it beats with a typically Loachian brand of social humanism, the director revelling in the collective might and will of the football crowd."

Fionnuala Halligan of Screen Daily stated, "Eric runs the gamut from whimsy, social commentary, high drama and violence before moving into a crowd-pleasing, literally rabble-rousing finale" and "Performances are as crisp and seemingly-genuine as in any Loach film – Evets and Henshaw are the main finds, while Cantona does look ill at ease at times and the aphorisms can wear a little thin."

Derek Elley of Variety felt that the film "is a curious hybrid", and wrote, "As in many of Laverty's scripts, problems of overall tone and character development aren't solved by Loach's easygoing direction, though when it works, Eric has many incidental pleasures."

Ray Bennett of The Hollywood Reporter noted, "Very funny and a bit sentimental, it's naturalistic comedy of the highest order, with Evets and Henshaw standouts among a terrific cast. Cantona too shows great comic timing and is both imposing and self-effacing."

A. O. Scott of The New York Times called Looking for Eric "gentle and sweet and often very funny." Scott also opined, "The film's riotous climax deftly turns grim social realism into action-slapstick revenge farce. Not something Mr. Loach has tried before, and something he turns out to do rather well."

Betsy Sharkey of the Los Angeles Times stated, "Loach and Laverty have packed so many storylines and social themes into the film that the point is sometimes lost in all the complications. The filmmakers play around so much with the Cantona mystique, it's not a deal breaker if you know nothing about him, but it's a better film if you do. The cast, though, is nearly pitch-perfect."

Roger Ebert of the Chicago Sun-Times gave the film 2 out of 4 stars, and noted, "Looking for Eric is inexplicable. It has elements of a Loach social drama, which might have been better used as the entire story. Cantona is nice enough, but so what? If there seem to be any comic possibilities in the story, Loach doesn't find them."

== See also ==
- List of association football films
