= Johnny Beattie =

Scottish actor and stand-up comedian (1926–2020)

Johnny Beattie MBE
- Johnny Beattie performing at a charity Ceilidh in Glasgow in 2009.
- Born: John Gerard Beattie; 9 November 1926; Govan, Glasgow, Scotland
- Died: 9 July 2020 (aged 93); Clydebank, West Dunbartonshire, Scotland
- Occupations: Actor, comedian
- Years active: 1956–2016
- Spouse: Kitty Lamont (m. 1950; sep. 1982)
- Children: 4 (including Maureen Beattie)

John Gerard Beattie, MBE (9 November 1926 – 9 July 2020) was a Scottish actor and stand-up comedian whose career spanned over six decades. He appeared on shows including the sketch show Scotch & Wry and the sitcom Rab C. Nesbitt, and later appeared in more dramatic roles including Malcolm Hamilton in the soap opera River City.

== Early life and career ==
Beattie was born in Govan, Glasgow, on 9 November 1926 into a working class family. He grew up there with an older brother, Frank, and two younger sisters, Mary and Cathie. He attended St Gerard's Roman Catholic Secondary School, but left school at sixteen to start an apprenticeship and became involved with amateur dramatics, and by the mid-1950s he had become a stand-up comedian.

Beattie starred in his own sketch show, Johnny Beattie's Saturday Night Show, which featured him playing many different colourful characters, including his alter ego "Glaikit O'Toole". The show ran on BBC One from January 1964 to February 1970. In 1974, Beattie took part in STV's four-part series A Grand Tour, along with Rikki Fulton, Jack Milroy, Billy Connolly, Mark McManus and Stanley Baxter, in which the six performers went on a grand tour of Scotland and took part in useless tasks. Beattie recalled his most renowned moment on the show as when he was made to "Take a long drop off a short pier", in which each of the participants had to compete.

Beattie went on to appear on Rikki Fulton's sketch show Scotch & Wry, at one point appearing as Glaikit O'Toole, who encounters Fulton's character Supercop in one of the sketches. While on the set of Scotch & Wry, he met actor Gregor Fisher, with whom he went on to appear in the 1990s sitcom Rab C. Nesbitt. In 1990, Beattie starred in The Big Man alongside Billy Connolly and Liam Neeson. He also appeared in popular Scottish television shows including Taggart, and he was also the original host of the Scottish Television game show Now You See It for three years between 1981 and 1984.

He had a couple of local hit records with "Scotch on the Rocks" and "The Glasgow Rap" and presented radio shows on BBC Radio Scotland and Clyde 2 before he was cast as Malcolm Hamilton in the Scottish soap opera River City, a role which he had retained since the show began in 2002. He filmed his last scenes for the show in April 2015 having announced his retirement after more than 60 years. He was the Honorary President of the Scottish Music Hall Society.

== Personal life and death ==
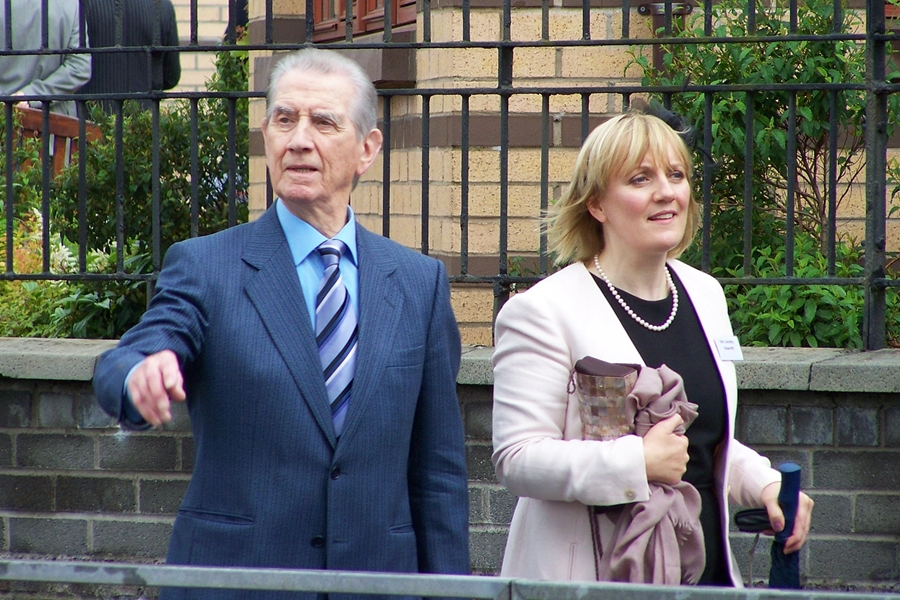
Johnny Beattie

Beattie married Kitty Lamont in 1950. They had two daughters (Maureen, an actress, and Louise, a solicitor and former actress) and two sons (Paul and Mark). Beattie and Lamont separated in 1982, and she died in 1994.

Beattie died on 9 July 2020 at the St. Margaret's Hospice in Clydebank, aged 93.

== Awards ==
Beattie was appointed a Member of the Order of the British Empire in the 2007 New Year Honours list. He received the 1981 Benno Schotz award as TV Personality of the Year. He received the Lord Provost's Performing Arts Award in 1993.
