= The Angels' Share =

- Theatrical release poster
- Directed by: Ken Loach
- Written by: Paul Laverty
- Produced by: Rebecca O'Brien
- Starring: Paul Brannigan; John Henshaw; William Ruane; Gary Maitland; Jasmin Riggins
- Cinematography: Robbie Ryan
- Edited by: Jonathan Morris
- Music by: George Fenton
- Production companies: Sixteen Films; Why Not Productions; Wild Bunch
- Distributed by: Entertainment One
- Release dates: May 2012 (Cannes); 1 June 2012 (United Kingdom)
- Running time: 106 minutes
- Countries: United Kingdom; France; Belgium; Italy
- Languages: English; Scots
- Box office: £4.3 million

The Angels' Share is a 2012 comedy-drama film directed by Ken Loach and starring Paul Brannigan, John Henshaw, and William Ruane. Set in Glasgow, Scotland, it tells the story of a young father who narrowly avoids a prison sentence. He is determined to turn over a new leaf and when he and his friends from the same community payback group visit a whisky distillery, a route to a new life becomes apparent. The title is from "the angels' share", a term for the portion (share) of a whisky's volume that is lost to evaporation during aging in oak barrels.

== Plot ==
In the opening scenes, the protagonists are sentenced to hours of community payback.During his first community payback session under the guidance of Harry, Robbie, is interrupted and taken to the hospital by Harry as his girlfriend, Leonie, has gone into labour. At the hospital, Robbie is assaulted by two of his girlfriend's uncles and her dad before he can see her.

Harry takes the group to a distillery as a reward for their good behaviour, where they learn what "the angels' share" is.

However, Robbie is still being pursued by an old enemy, Clancy. He is about to undergo a beating by Clancy and his followers when he is unexpectedly rescued by Leonie's father. The man tells him that the only way for him to escape the cycle of violence is to leave Glasgow.

At the next community service session, Harry asks Robbie if he'd like to come to a whisky tasting in Edinburgh. Mo overhears and invites herself, Albert and Rhino. Reluctantly, Harry agrees to take all four of them to Edinburgh, where they learn about a cask of priceless whisky, the Malt Mill, set to go on auction soon, and Robbie is passed a business card by a whisky collector, Thaddeus. After they leave, Mo reveals she spotted and stole documents detailing the warehouse in which the Malt Mill is stored.

Robbie and Leonie view a flat which they could rent for six months while the owner is away. It is then revealed they have been followed by one of Clancy's men. Robbie, realising that he can't continue living under threat of assault on himself and his family, begins planning to steal the Malt Mill with his community service partners. They secure an invitation to the tasting and auction, during which Robbie slopes off to the warehouse to siphon some of the whisky into empty Irn-Bru bottles.

Afterwards, Robbie approaches Thaddeus and negotiates a sale of three bottles for £200,000, and "a real job". They plan to make the exchange in Glasgow, and so begin the trek home, but inadvertently break two of their four bottles during an encounter with the police. Robbie negotiates a sale for £100,000 and a permanent job far away from Glasgow. Afterwards, Robbie reveals to his friends that he didn't sell two bottles, but one. The scene cuts to show Harry coming home to find a bottle of Irn Bru on his kitchen table, with a note thanking him for giving him a chance, presenting his "angels' share", next to a newspaper piece showing a photo of the group next to the cask.

In the final scene, Robbie and Leonie leave for Stirling in an immaculate old Volkswagen Type 2, having made temporary goodbyes to the rest of the group. After they leave, the rest of the group resolve to go get wasted. The film ends with The Proclaimers' "500 Miles" playing.

== Cast ==
- Paul Brannigan as Robbie
- John Henshaw as Harry
- Gary Maitland as Albert
- Jasmin Riggins as Mo
- William Ruane as Rhino
- Roger Allam as Thaddeus
- David Goodall as Dobie
- Siobhan Reilly as Leonie
- Roderick Cowie as Anthony
- Scott Kyle as Clancy
- Neil Leiper as Sniper
- Gilbert Martin as Matt
- Vincent Friell as Procurator Fiscal
- Joy McAvoy as Mairi

== Production ==
The film was produced by Sixteen Films, Why Not Productions and Wild Bunch. It was backed financially by the BFI, Les Films du Fleuve, Urania and France 2 Cinéma. Filming in Glasgow and Edinburgh started 25 April 2011.

== Release ==
The film competed for the Palme d'Or at the 2012 Cannes Film Festival, and Loach won the Jury Prize. It was Loach's 11th film in 31 years to compete at the French festival. Entertainment One acquired the distribution rights for the United Kingdom and Ireland, where the film went on general release on 1 June.

=== Critical reception ===
The Angels' Share was met with critical acclaim. Film review aggregator Rotten Tomatoes reports that 89% of critics gave the film a positive review, based on a sample of 101 reviews, with a rating average of 7.1 out of 10. On Metacritic, the film received a score of 66 based on 26 reviews, indicating "generally favorable reviews". The film was nominated for the Magritte Award for Best Foreign Film in Coproduction and at the 2012 Cannes Film Festival won the Jury Prize (the third-most prestigious prize at the film festival).

=== Home media ===
Entertainment One released The Angels' Share on Blu-ray Disc and DVD on 24 September 2012, in the United Kingdom.

== See also ==
- Cinema of Scotland
- Cinema of France
