= Stormy Monday (film) =

1988 crime thriller film by Mike Figgis

- UK film poster
- Directed by: Mike Figgis
- Written by: Mike Figgis
- Produced by: Nigel Stafford-Clark
- Starring: Melanie Griffith; Tommy Lee Jones; Sting; Sean Bean
- Cinematography: Roger Deakins
- Edited by: David Martin
- Music by: Mike Figgis
- Production company: British Screen; Film4; The Moving Picture Company; Atlantic Entertainment Group
- Distributed by: Atlantic Releasing
- Release dates: 22 April 1988 (New York City, premiere); 29 April 1988 (US); 20 January 1989 (UK)
- Running time: 93 minutes
- Countries: United Kingdom; United States
- Language: English
- Budget: US$4 million
- Box office: US$1.8 million

Stormy Monday is a 1988 neo-noir thriller film written, scored, and directed by Mike Figgis in his feature directorial debut, and starring Melanie Griffith, Sean Bean, Tommy Lee Jones, and Sting. The film follows an Irishman living in Newcastle upon Tyne, where he becomes embroiled in an American businessman's plot to acquire a prominent jazz club.

A co-production between the United Kingdom and the United States, Stormy Monday was filmed in Newcastle upon Tyne in the summer of 1987. The film's title refers to blues guitarist and singer T-Bone Walker's signature song "Call It Stormy Monday (But Tuesday Is Just As Bad)".

The film premiered in on 22 April 1988. It had a generally positive critical reception. A television spinoff, Finney, debuted on ITV in 1994.

== Plot ==
In Newcastle upon Tyne, Irishman Brendan finds an ad for a janitorial position at the Key Club owned by Mr. Finney. En route to his interview, Brendan stops at a local shopping centre, where he crosses paths with an American woman, Kate. When Brendan meets Finney, the club owner is uninterested in Brendan until they discover a shared love of jazz, after which Finney hires him immediately.

Brendan is sent by Finney to retrieve the Kraków Jazz Ensemble from the airport and bring them to the Royal Station Hotel. Kate also visits the hotel, where a corrupt New York City businessman, Francis Cosmo, is a guest of honour for the city's "America Week," intended to secure international development deals for Newcastle. Previously, Kate had worked for Cosmo, posing as a prostitute to help him in securing business deals. After his first work shift, Brendan orders dinner at a restaurant when he is surprised to see that his waitress is Kate. As he waits for his meal, he overhears two men talking about buying Finney out of his club. They make it clear that they are willing to kill Finney to get their way.

Kate accepts Brendan's invitation for a date, and the two visit a pub. However, Brendan interrupts the date to seek out Finney and warn him about what he overheard in the restaurant.

At the Key Club, Finney is ready for the gangsters. He overpowers them with his own men, and breaks the arm of the heavy with the implements that were intended to break his own arm. For Brendan's tip-off, Finney gifts him a brand new Jaguar. Back at the hotel, Cosmo is honoured for the "America Week" festival. The Polish band is enlisted at the last minute to sub in for the originally scheduled band. Meanwhile, Kate is at the event in the company of a corpulent executive who makes sexual advances on her.

When Kate subsequently asks for the night off at the restaurant, her boss fires her, and she responds by breaking several stacks of plates. Andrej Slominski, a member of the Kraków Jazz Ensemble, invites Brendan and Kate to a Polish social club, where they watch a live musical performance that moves Kate to tears. While leaving the club, Cosmo's associate, Bob, signals for Brendan to stop his car during a rainstorm. When he does, Bob and several henchmen attack them, but Brendan manages to retrieve a gun from his glove compartment, and kills one of them. An injured Brendan flees with Kate to the Royal Station Hotel, where they hide in Andrej's room.

The following morning, Finney meets with Cosmo and agrees to sell his club. Meanwhile, Kate confesses to Brendan that she knows Bob and worked for Cosmo. Worried that Cosmo will have them killed, Kate asks Brendan to return to the United States with her to her hometown in Minnesota, to which he agrees. Kate drives Brendan's Jaguar to her apartment to retrieve her things, but is surprised there by Cosmo, who claims there are two plane tickets to Minneapolis waiting for her at Heathrow Airport. Meanwhile, one of Cosmo's associates plants a bomb in the Jaguar which will detonate at midnight.

Kate returns to get Brendan, who is sceptical of the alleged airline tickets, as he had heard in a radio broadcast that the airline cancelled its flights. They go to the Key Club to speak with Finney, who is with Cosmo, about to sign over the club. There, Brendan allows Andrej and his girlfriend Christine to borrow his Jaguar. As Andrej and Christine drive away, the bomb detonates, killing them. Brendan aims his gun at Cosmo, but Finney convinces him not to pull the trigger. Finney tears up the contract, and a defeated Cosmo leaves the club.

== Cast ==
- Melanie Griffith as Kate
- Tommy Lee Jones as Francis Cosmo
- Sting as Mr. Finney
- Sean Bean as Brendan
- James Cosmo as Tony
- Alison Steadman as Mayor
- Mark Long as Patrick
- Heathcote Williams as Peter Reed
- Derek Hoxby as Bob
- Andrzej Borkowski as Andrzej Slominski
- Dorota Zienska as Christine
- John Johnson as Man on Stretcher

== Production ==
=== Development and casting ===
The production was initially a low-budget project titled The Side, funded by Channel 4 and British Screen. Mike Figgis, who had spent much of his formative years in Newcastle, wrote the film with specific locations throughout the city in mind. Sting had also grown up in the city, and utilised his native accent for his role.

When the project attracted financing from the U.S.-based Atlantic Releasing, it was suggested that the film be recast with American actors, after which Melanie Griffith and Tommy Lee Jones were cast in the roles of Kate and Cosmo, respectively.

=== Filming ===
Filming began in Newcastle upon Tyne on 6 July 1987.

== Release ==
Stormy Monday premiered in New York City on 22 April 1988, opening in two cinemas. Within four days, the film had grossed $49,343. It opened in Los Angeles the following week, on 29 April 1988. It was released in the UK on 20 January 1989.

=== Home media ===
MGM Home Entertainment released Stormy Monday on DVD in the United States on 17 September 2002. In 2018, Arrow Films released the film in two-disc DVD and Blu-ray combination set.

== Reception ==
=== Box office ===
The film had a worldwide gross of $1,791,328.

=== Reception ===
Stormy Monday received a generally positive reception from critics. It holds a rating of 78% on Rotten Tomatoes from 18 reviews, with an average rating of 6.9/10.

Janet Maslin of The New York Times wrote "Mr. Figgis, who is a musician as well as a film maker, brings the place, the plot and the film's haunting characters vibrantly to life. What's more, he makes them irresistibly interesting." Derek Adams for Time Out wrote "Mix American gangsters, molls and majorettes with Polish avant-garde jazz musicians against a Newcastle background - and what you've got is a curious homage to B movie Hollywood and the rain-washed neon of the pulps."

Joe Leydon wrote "Stormy Monday is a sleek, smoky romantic thriller, the sort of atmospheric neo-film noir that even very experienced directors seldom manage to pull off. Surprisingly enough, it is the work of a first-time feature filmmaker, Mike Figgis, a former pop musician who, despite some British TV credits, never made a movie before this one. He doubtless will be making many more."

== Television series ==
The film was followed by the ITV series Finney in 1994, starring David Morrissey as Finney in the years before Stormy Monday is set.
