= Barney Clark (actor) =

English actor

- Born: Barney Ivan S. Clark; 25 June 1993 (age 32); Hackney, London, England, United Kingdom
- Other name: Barney Clarke
- Occupation: Actor
- Years active: 2001–2010
- Known for: Oliver Twist

Barney Ivan S. Clark (born 25 June 1993) is an English former actor, best known for his role in the 2005 film Oliver Twist.

== Early life ==
Clark began acting in school plays and appeared in the 2001 film Lawless Heart when he was eight. He attended Central Foundation Boys' School in Islington, London, and was in the purple form.

== Career ==
He successfully auditioned for the title role in the 2005 version of Oliver Twist, directed by Roman Polanski; 800 children had auditioned for the role. The film opened in September 2005 and Clark received positive reviews for his performance although the film was mostly considered a financial and critical disappointment. When he was on the set of Oliver Twist he kept a diary every day.

His later projects included Savage Grace and short film Moog.

=== Legal issues ===
In December 2011, Clark was sentenced to 14 months in prison for violent disorder after a December 2010 rave he was attending was shut down by the police.

== Filmography ==
| Year | Title | Role | Notes |
|---|---|---|---|
| 2001 | Lawless Heart | James | |
| 2003 | Foyle's War | Tim Howard | Episode: War Games |
| 2004 | The Brief | Zak Farmer | Two episodes |
| 2005 | Oliver Twist | Oliver Twist | |
| 2007 | Moog | Sebastian Moog | short film |
| 2007 | Savage Grace | Tony at 12 | |
| 2008 | Doctors | Michael Morgan | Episode: Ready or Not? |
| 2010 | Child | Jacky | short film |
