= Finney (TV series) =

- DVD cover
- Genre: Crime drama
- Written by: David Kane
- Directed by: David Hayman
- Starring: David Morrissey; Christopher Fairbank; Lynn Farleigh; Melanie Hill; Pooky Quesnel; Clive Russell; Andy Serkis; John Woodvine
- Composer: John Lunn
- Country of origin: United Kingdom
- Original language: English
- No. of series: 1
- No. of episodes: 6

Production
- Executive producers: Scott Meek; Keith Richardson; Peter Moth
- Producer: Nigel Stafford-Clark
- Production locations: Glasgow, Scotland, Newcastle upon Tyne, Tyne and Wear, England, UK
- Cinematography: Kevin Rowley
- Editor: Martin Sharpe
- Running time: 50 minutes
- Production companies: Zenith Entertainment; Tyne Tees Television

Original release
- Network: ITV
- Release: 17 November – 22 December 1994

Finney is a six-part British television crime drama series, written and created by David Kane and directed by David Hayman, that first broadcast on ITV on 17 November 1994. A television spin-off from the 1988 film Stormy Monday, Finney stars David Morrissey in the title role, taking over from Sting. The series was produced by Zenith Entertainment in association with Tyne Tees Television. The series was produced by Nigel Stafford-Clark, who also acted as producer on Stormy Monday.

Finney co-starred Christopher Fairbank, Lynn Farleigh, Melanie Hill, Pooky Quesnel, Clive Russell, Andy Serkis and John Woodvine in supporting roles, and follows the struggle for power between two rival crime families - the Finneys and the Simpsons. The series received critical acclaim, including The Times, who commented: "It's the real thing. The acting is terrific." and the Daily Star, who called the series "addictive viewing" and commented that it was "nail-bitingly good." The complete series was released on Region 1 DVD in the United States on 28 August 2007; but remains unreleased on Region 2.

== Reception ==
Allison Pearson of The Independent reviewed the first episode of the series, writing: "Finney... is an everyday story of disorganised crime in which the Corleone family has quit Long Island for Whitley Bay, changed its name to Tucker and been issued with Geordie accents that deliver lines of untold menace... With its designer violence, Finney is just what the network director ordered. Its main problem is perennial and insoluble: British villains are just not up to speed."

== Cast ==
- David Morrissey as Stephen Finney
- Christopher Fairbank as Bobo Simpson Jr.
- Lynn Farleigh as Mary
- Melanie Hill as Lena Finney
- Pooky Quesnel as Carol Finney
- Clive Russell as Tucker Finney
- Andy Serkis as Tom Finney
- John Woodvine as Bobo Simpson Snr.
- Michael Yeaman as Jimmy Spears
- David Hayman as McDade
- Brian Lewis as PawPaw
- Angela Lonsdale as Suzie Finney
- Mark Benton as Billy
- Jonathan Magnanti as Iain
- John McArdle as Louis Souter
- Joyce Falconer as Lorna

== Episodes ==
No.	Title	Directed by	Written by	Original release date
1	"Episode 1"	David Hayman	David Kane	17 November 1994
Patrick "Tucker" Finney, the patriarch of a criminal family, is murdered. His son Tom, a compulsive gambler and drug addict, and Bobo Simpson, a local businessman and head of a rival crime family, are among the suspects. Tucker's eldest son, Steven, having escaped the powerful, violent world in which his family operate, returns home following the murder, but his siblings are astounded by his lack of empathy. As a sick joke, Tucker leaves Steven a derelict cinema in his will which sits slap bang in the middle of Simpson territory. Determined to open his own jazz club, Steven tries to turn his back on the family crime business, and finally pull his life together. Meanwhile, his older sister Lena, who has inherited both Tucker's shady empire and his hard personality, decides to find out who murdered her father.
2	"Episode 2"	David Hayman	David Kane	24 November 1994
Steven discovers that his father's legacy is more entrenched than he openly cares to admit. Lena's demand for vengeance leads Tom to mastermind a murderous hit on Simpson, which places Finney in the crosshairs of a revenge-fuelled gang war threatening to explode with deadly ferocity.
3	"Episode 3"	David Hayman	David Kane	1 December 1994
4	"Episode 4"	David Hayman	David Kane	8 December 1994
5	"Episode 5"	David Hayman	David Kane	15 December 1994
6	"Episode 6"	David Hayman	David Kane	22 December 1994
