= List of River City characters introduced in 2002–2003 =

River City was a long running BBC Scotland soap opera set in the fictional Glasgow suburb of Shieldinch in Scotland. This is a list of characters who first appeared on the programme during 2002 and 2003, listed in order of their first appearance.

== Moira Henderson ==
Moira Henderson
- River City character
- Portrayed by: Jo Cameron Brown
- Duration: 2002–2004
- First appearance: 24 September 2002
In-universe information
- Husband: George Henderson
- Daughters: Alice Henderson
- Grandsons: Brian Henderson
- Other relatives: Derek 'Deek' Henderson

Moira Henderson is a fictional character from the BBC Scotland soap opera River City played by Jo Cameron Brown.

Moira was the wife of George Henderson. She was killed in a car crash caused by her grandson Brian Henderson (William Ruane).

== George Henderson ==
George Henderson
- River City character
- Portrayed by: John Murtagh
- Duration: 2002–2007
- First appearance: 24 September 2002
In-universe information
- Wife: Moira Henderson (1st wife); Shirley Henderson (2nd wife)
- Daughters: Alice Henderson
- Grandsons: Brian Henderson
- Other relatives: Derek 'Deek' Henderson

George Henderson is a fictional character from the BBC Scotland soap opera River City played by John Murtagh. George was a taxi driver.

His wife killed in a car crash caused by his grandson Brian Henderson (William Ruane). He discovers that Alice Henderson (Lorraine McIntosh) is not his biological daughter.

His second wife was Shirley Henderson (Barbara Rafferty). In 2007, he died from a terminal brain tumour.

== Raymond Henderson ==
Raymond Henderson
- River City character
- Portrayed by: Paul Samson
- Duration: 2002–2014
- First appearance: 24 September 2002
In-universe information
- Father: George Henderson
- Mother: Moira Henderson
- Nephews: Derek 'Deek' Henderson
- Nieces: Alice Henderson

Raymond Henderson is a fictional character from the BBC Scotland soap opera River City played by Paul Samson. He appeared for 12 years.

By 2010, Raymond had to adjust to the fact of Iona moving out of the flat so that she could have her own life, but he did enjoy having someone with him after losing his late wife, who was Iona's sister. Raymond however gave his best wishes to Iona and she moved out - to across the street.

Raymond has recently began to think about fostering after realising he hasn't fulfilled his dream, and has now decided that he wants to help someone else and make a difference to there lives. His former wife Eileen Donachie also agreed to help him with fostering children, which Raymond was thrilled about. After Archie's funeral, when Eileen got very drunk, Raymond and Eileen slept together, after this they both agreed they enjoyed there comfortable relationship, and how they would make good foster parents, not making the mistakes that they did with there children.

In 2012, he set fire to The Tall Ship public house. In 2014, Raymond was murdered by corrupt councillor Frank Paton.

== Brian Henderson ==
Brian Henderson
- River City character
- Portrayed by: William Ruane
- Duration: 2002–2004
- First appearance: 24 September 2002
- Last appearance: 24 May 2016
In-universe information
- Grandfathers: George Henderson
- Grandmothers: Moira Henderson
- Other relatives: Alice Henderson; Derek 'Deek' Henderson

Brian Henderson is a fictional character from the BBC Scotland soap opera River City played by William Ruane.

On 2 January 2004, Brian caused a car crash which killed his grandmother Moira Henderson (Jo Cameron Brown).

Brian was written out to "receive medical treatment" following a storyline involving the abduction of Hazel Campbell (Annmarie Fulton).

== Robert Henderson ==
Robert Henderson
- River City character
- Portrayed by: Maurice Roeves
- Duration: 2002–2010s
- First appearance: 24 September 2002
In-universe information
- Other relatives: George Henderson; Moira Henderson; Alice Henderson; Derek 'Deek' Henderson

Robert Henderson is a fictional character from the BBC Scotland soap opera River City played by Maurice Roeves. Robert was a villainous character.

== Alice Henderson ==
Alice Henderson
- River City character
- Portrayed by: Lorraine McIntosh
- Duration: 2002–2010
- First appearance: 24 September 2002
In-universe information
- Other relatives: George Henderson; Moira Henderson; Robert Henderson; Derek 'Deek' Henderson

Alice Henderson is a fictional character from the BBC Scotland soap opera River City played by Lorraine McIntosh.

Alice struggled with alcoholism. In 2010, She was jailed after trying to frame a teacher for child pornography.

== Bob O'Hara ==
Bob O'Hara
- River City character
- Portrayed by: Stephen Purdon
- Duration: 2002–2026
In-universe information
- Mother: Theresa O'Hara
- Wife: Kim O'Hara
- Daughters: Mackenzie O'Hara
- Aunts: Scarlett O'Hara; Bernie O'Hara

Bob O'Hara (also Adams), known as Robert 'Shellsuit Bob' Adams, is a fictional character from the BBC Scotland soap opera River City, played by Stephen Purdon. His best friend is Angus Lindsay (Scott Fletcher).

== Stevie O'Hara ==
Stevie O'Hara
- River City character
- Portrayed by: Cas Harkins (2002–2005); Iain Robertson (2017–2024)
- Duration: 2002–2005, 2017–2024
In-universe information
- Mother: Scarlett O'Hara
- Aunts: Bernie O'Hara; Theresa O'Hara

Stevie O'Hara is a fictional character from the BBC Scotland soap opera River City.

== Hazel Campbell ==
Hazel Campbell
- River City character
- Portrayed by: Annmarie Fulton
- Duration: 2002–2005

Hazel Campbell (also Donachie) is a fictional character from the BBC Scotland soap opera River City portrayed by Annmarie Fulton.

== Roisin McIntyre ==
Roisin McIntyre
- River City character
- Portrayed by: Joyce Falconer
- Duration: 2002–2008, 2021–2026
In-universe information
- Sisters: Iona McIntyre; Shona McIntyre
- Daughters: Alanna McVey

Roisin McIntyre is a fictional character from the BBC Scotland soap opera River City, played by Joyce Falconer. She first appeared in 2002 and left in 2008. She returned in 2021. The character has been compared to Bet Lynch from Coronation Street.

== Malcolm Hamilton ==
Malcolm Hamilton
- River City character
- Portrayed by: Johnny Beattie
- Duration: 2002–2015
In-universe information
- Daughters: Eileen Donachie

Malcolm Hamilton is a fictional character from the BBC Scotland soap opera River City, played by Johnny Beattie. Malcolm is known for featuring in many of the shows biggest moments.

Malcolm is the wise old owl of Shieldinch. He's a family man and has a daughter Eileen and grandchildren. Beattie left the role in 2015 at the age of 88.

== Tommy Donachie ==
Tommy Donachie
- River City character
- Portrayed by: Eric Barlow
- Duration: 2002–2003
In-universe information
- Spouse: Eileen Donachie
- Other relatives: Ewan Donachie

Tommy Donachie is a fictional character in the BBC Scotland soap, River City played by Eric Barlow.

The debut episode in 2002 saw his wedding day where he married Eileen Donachie (Deirdre Davis) wedding day.

== Eileen Donachie ==
Eileen Donachie
- River City character
- Portrayed by: Deirdre Davis
- Duration: 2002–2016
In-universe information
- Father: Malcolm Hamilton

Eileen Donachie (née Hamilton, previously Henderson) is a fictional character from the BBC Scotland soap opera River City, played by Deirdre Davis.

Eileen has lived in Shieldinch her whole life. She was first married to Raymond Henderson, however it wasn't a happy marriage, but did produce two children, Brian and Kirsty. Eileen did eventually remarry, too Tommy Donachie following her divorce to Raymond. She was originally a pub landlady.

After her marriage to Raymond fell apart, Eileen decided to remarry to the man she thought was her real one true love. Eileen and Tommy did marry with her ex-husband Raymond turning up on there big day! Their new joined family seemed cursed from the beginning. When Lewis Cope turned up in Shieldinch, who was Eileen's first love, she began to get bored with Tommy, and had an affair with her old flame, with disastrous consequences. Eventually, Tommy found out about this, along with everyone else in the community - because of this Eileen and Tommy split up. However, after a long wait, Eileen and Tommy were going to get back together and whilst on the way to meet him, he was tragically hit on the head, therefore killed instantly by the 'Shieldinch Strangler'. After this, Eileen sold the Grill that she ran at the Tall Ship. Eileen never had a proper serious relationship after this, and enjoyed flings with younger men, which proved to make her happy, at least for the time being. However, soon Eileen was having an affair with her sisters husband, Archie Buchanan and when Gina found out, Archie manipulated her, and she chose to stay with him and cut all ties with her family, leaving them in turmoil. But, the worst was yet to come when Eileen was dragged into Gina's mad world, and Archie's supposed death, helping her sister dispose of his body after a confrontation which saw Archie's mother Liz, hit him over the head which left him supposedly 'dead'. Soon, Archie was back, claiming to have amnesia and living under the name of Douglas, but Eileen knew all along that Archie hadn't changed and what he was really like, Archie soon went back to his old trick, and Gina left him and went back to her family, much to there delight.

Eileen did however eventually find a new romance, in the form of young politician, Alex Judd, it did fail, but proved not to be such a total disaster like the others. Eileen emerged from this relationship with a new purpose, wanting to help others and have a political awareness, and so Eileen defeated Alex in the community council elections and won the right to represent Shieldinch and its residents political matters.

By 2010, Eileen was dating Murray from the community centre, but after a series of bad dates, and a Valentine's Day with her sister Gina involved, Eileen tried to make things special for the two of them. However, things weren't too last when Murray dumped her, saying they had nothing in common, although he didn't tell her that he really had feelings for his sister Gina, and with that Eileen told Murray that she didn't like him either and that being with him was like hell on earth. After going to the Tall Ship to drown her sorrows, she met Bob O'Hara, who she was fond of, and offered the Janitor job to, at the community centre. Eileen agreed to become a foster parent along with her ex-husband Raymond, and after the funeral of Archie, she got too drunk and slept with him, and they both agreed that they enjoyed there comfortable relationship they had, and that they would both be good foster parents and not make the same mistakes they made with there children. Eileen and Raymond had a meeting with a social worker, where Eileen broke down, remembering the complications she had with her own children, however she stayed strong and they both told the social worker why they would be excellent parents and how they wouldn't let anybody down, the social worker then left and later rang, confirming that they had passed there meeting and she thought they would be excellent foster parents. Eileen had a second chance at motherhood with Stuart – the product of a one-night stand with Raymond.

Davis left the role in 2016. She returned in 2022 for the shows 20th anniversary.

== Gina Hamilton ==
Regina 'Gina' Hamilton (née Hamilton; previously Rossi and Buchanan) is a fictional character from the BBC Scotland soap opera River City, played by Libby McArthur. Gina has lived in Shieldinch for most of her life. She is the younger sister of Eileen. She had her first child, Ruth in her early twenties when she was a singer on a cruise ship. Gina was then a single parent, until she met the Italian Franco Rossi, who was the love of her life. Franco took on both Gina and Ruth, and the couple had a child together Joanne, and they ran the Oyster Café together. They were both very happy, with a thriving family and business, until Gina was widowed when Franco died in his thirties. She then began bringing up her girls and running the café alone.

Gina has been very unlucky in love twice after Franco, first for Dr. Marcus McKenzie, who turned out to be a brutal rapist who raped her, and after he was killed by Heather, her daughter Joanne found herself in the frame and had to stand trial, but then she was stabbed by Marcus' daughter who wanted revenge. Joanne lived, but Gina became wary of men after the incident. Then there was Archie Buchanan, who was only after her money from her successful business, however Gina found out, and things took a turn for the worse when she found out he was going to run away with his lover and leave her and his mother, Liz destitute. After there was a showdown, and Archie tried to attack Gina, Liz struck him over the head, and thinking it was fatal, Liz worried she would be arrested for murder, and so Gina and Eileen disposed of the body. However, Archie returned, and had seemingly lost his memory, Gina fell for him all over again, but Gina realised what she had done and that Archie's memory had, in fact, returned. Gina began to sort herself out, and tried to move on with her life, but due to the fact that Shieldinch became the hunting ground for a serial sex attacker, Gina feared the attacker so much. Her worst fears eventually came true when she was attacked, but with all her strength and might, she fought him off and this was tough for Gina, but she knew she was strong.

By 2010, Gina has become more aware of her feelings for Murray, her sister's boyfriend and after she ended up staying with them on a camping trip on Valentine's Day, she noticed how much she and Murray had in common, where as Murray and Eileen didn't. Eventually, Murray admitted his feelings too, and told Gina he would split up with Eileen and be with her, however after some confusion from Gina, she thought that he and Eileen were getting on fine and he was not going to leave her. Murray did split up with Eileen, however he couldn't tell Gina, as she thought he was just going to tell her that himself and Eileen were staying together.

Eventually, Gina found out the truth from Eileen, and Eileen agreed that both her and Murray deserved to be together, and so they did, both declaring there love for one another. Gina also found relief when Archie's body was found and he was buried, knowing that he could never come back to hurt her again, which she always feared.

== Ruth Rossi ==
Ruth Rossi
- River City character
- Portrayed by: Morag Calder
- Duration: 2002–2015
In-universe information
- Mother: Gina Hamilton
- Sisters: Joanne Rossi
- Husband: Andy Carroll
- Daughters: Eilidh Green
- Grandfathers: Malcolm Hamilton
- Uncles: Tommy Donachie
- Aunts: Eileen Donachie

Ruth Rossi (née Mitchell; also Carroll; previously Green) is a fictional character from the BBC Scotland soap opera River City, played by Morag Calder.

Ruth has lived and worked in Shieldinch for her whole life, and is the daughter of Gina Hamilton after being conceived on the Ship that Gina was a singer on, because of this Ruth has never met her father. Ruth's paternal influences were her sister, Joanne's father, Franco and her granddad Malcolm Hamilton, who was Gina's father.

By 2010, Ruth admitted her feelings for Gordon Swan who owns the salon, and after many chats, Gordon also admitted this, and after Ruth had a terrible valentines date with someone she had met over the internet, Gordon and Ruth finally shared there first kiss and started going out together as a couple. Once again, Robbie Fraser from Gordon's salon, had developed feelings for Gordon, decided to try and break Ruth and him up, he did this by sending a text and a bunch of flowers, but after a conversation and some information from Scott, both Ruth and Gordon realised that Robbie was trying to break them up, and cause yet even more trouble. Soon, Gordon sacked Robbie, but after a heartfelt apology, Ruth told Gordon to reconsider, in which he did, and let Robbie have his job back.

Since the return of her friend Iona McIntyre, Ruth has seen that she seems that she wants to move out of the Tall Ship flat, where she has been living with Raymond Henderson. So, after feeling lonely in her own flat, Ruth offered Iona a place to live with her, and Iona decided that the time was right and she moved in with Ruth.

Ruth married her childhood sweetheart Andy Carroll (Jamie Michie).

Calder left the role in 2011, returning for a guest return in 2016 for her character's grandfather Malcolm's funeral.

== Joanne Rossi ==
Joanne "Jo" Rossi is a fictional character in the BBC Scotland soap, River City who was originally played by Allison McKenzie who left the role in 2007. Joanne was later portrayed by Lisa Gardner.

Joanne lived in Shieldinch for most of her life until she became older. She spent her childhood dreaming of being famous and rich, and that's why she didn't do well at school or pass her exams. She was encouraged by her mother Gina Hamilton, which was bad enough, as Joanne was never going to go that far, was she? Joanne lost her father Franco, when he was quite young, but Gina managed to bring her up, along with Joanne's sister Ruth Rossi whilst owning and running the Oyster Café.

In 2009, her son Franco dies in a car crash.

== Lewis Cope ==
Lewis Cope
- River City character
- Portrayed by: Duncan Duff
- Duration: 2002–2005
- First appearance: 24 September 2002
- Last appearance: 1 February 2005
In-universe information
- Occupation: Property developer

Lewis Cope is a fictional character in the BBC Scotland soap, River City, played by Duncan Duff. Lewis is a property developer.

== Lily Fraser ==
Lily Fraser
- River City character
- Portrayed by: Ida Schuster
- Duration: 2002
- First appearance: 24 September 2002
In-universe information
- Occupation: Pensioner

Lily Fraser is a fictional character in the BBC Scotland soap, River City, played by Ida Schuster. Lily Fraser was a sprightly Shieldinch resident. When Lily wasn't tending to the communal gardens in her close, she was flirting with fellow pensioner, Malcolm Hamilton. Lily leaves Shieldinch to join her son in Canada but returns briefly to sort out her affairs only to find the Adams family living in her flat. After initial anger, she takes pity on them and lets them stay.

== Marcus McKenzie ==
Marcus McKenzie
- River City character
- Portrayed by: Stefan Dennis
- Duration: 2002–2003
In-universe information
- Occupation: Doctor
- Daughters: Steph McKenzie

Marcus McKenzie is a fictional character from the BBC Scotland soap opera River City played by Stefan Dennis. He is murdered in 2003.

== Russ Minto ==
Russ Minto
- River City character
- Portrayed by: Grant Ibbs
- Duration: 2002–2003

Russ Minto is a fictional character from the BBC Scotland soap opera River City played by English actor Grant Ibbs.

== Robert Adams ==
Robert 'Bob' Adams is a fictional character in the BBC Scotland soap opera River City, played by Stephen Purdon.

Bob Adams has lived in Shieldinch for most of his life, having no desire to live anywhere else. Whilst growing up, Bob found things difficult, especially being born in the problem family, the Adams family, who never had a lot of cash and clashed with his father due to his manipulating nature. Bob eventually left the family because of this.

When River City first began, Bob was known as "Shellsuit Bob" and was constantly getting himself into trouble with his best friend Derek 'Deek' Henderson. During this time, he temporarily lost his memory, got very low grades in his Standard Grades and became engaged to local Indian girl, Zara Malik, much to the disapproval of her traditional family. When she moved away, their engagement came to an end. He later met Charlie Drummond, whom he became engaged to. They were almost married, however she got cold feet and the wedding was called off and the relationship subsequently came to an end. He later entered into a relationship with Nicki Cullen, his flatmate and work colleague. They initially kept their relationship a secret from Deek, as they did not want to upset him or their living arrangements.

Bob had decided to go on a stag weekend with Deek for one of there friends, yet after the stag weekend, Bob came back harbouring a massive secret - he had, in fact, cheated on his girlfriend Nicki Cullen, and after weeks of trying to keep it from her, she finally found out when Bob told her as he couldn't lie to her any longer. With that, Nicki decided to leave Shieldinch for Spain to be with Shirley, and after begging her to stay, Bob finally lost his girlfriend when she left.

Bob was devastated to discover his mother Scarlett was in fact his aunt.

== Derek Henderson ==
Derek 'Deek' Henderson is a fictional character from the BBC Scotland soap opera River City, played by Gordon McCorkell.

From being young, Deek didn't have a very happy life. Firstly, he was the product of an affair when his mother slept with her teacher whilst she was a teenager, which didn't exactly make his future promising. As well as this, his mother had a serious drinking problem, and eventually Deek was brought up by his grandparents when his grandfather secretly paid off his mother to leave him.

Derek or Deek as known to his friends, was first introduced to viewers as a ned who was constantly getting himself into trouble with his best friend Bob. He lived with his grandparents, George and Moira Henderson as his mother was at this stage absent. His mother Alice was an alcoholic and had given birth to him at the age of 16 and ran away, leaving George and Moira to bring up Deek. Alice later returned and Deek's relationship was explored with her. Other storylines have shown Deek change from a troublemaker to an entrepreneur - he briefly went to University to gain a Business Management qualification, he ran the tanning salon and now runs the garage with best friend, Bob. He is known for his lack of success with women. In 2010, he had taken in homeless girl Stella Walker to whom he has formed a close bond. Deek chucked Stella out of his home, when Molly spiked her drink, and he thought that she was drinking again. But, Stella came back to try and patch it up with Deek, and make sure he found out the truth, however after many failed attempts she walked away just as Deek found out the truth that Molly had in fact spiked her drink, and Stella was telling the truth, leaving him devastated. He then looked for Stella for weeks, until he finally found her living rough in a squat with other homeless people, begging her to return to Shieldinch with him, she objected, saying she would rather stay with in a dirty squat with terrible conditions than live with him, however she did return and moved back in with him, supporting him through his mothers death.

In 2012, Deek was killed by Sean Kennedy in a hit and run.

== Scott Wallace ==
Scott Wallace is a fictional character in the BBC Scotland soap, River City played by Tony Kearney from 2002 to 2012. He was the shows first gay character.

== Johnny Wu ==
Johnny Wu is a fictional character in the BBC Scotland soap, River City played by Richard Ng in 2002.

== Thomas McCabe ==
Thomas McCabe is a fictional character in the BBC Scotland soap, River City played by Tam Dean Burn in 2002. Thomas is a gangster.

== Cormac O'Sullivan ==
Cormac O'Sullivan
- River City character
- Portrayed by: Jason Pitt
- Duration: 2002–2005

Cormac O'Sullivan is a fictional character in the BBC Scotland soap, River City played by Jason Pitt. He appeared from 2002 to 2005.

== Heather Bellshaw ==
Heather Bellshaw
- River City character
- Portrayed by: Jenni Keenan Green
- Duration: 2002–2008

Heather Bellshaw is a fictional character in the BBC Scotland soap, River City played by Jenni Keenan Green from 2002 to 2008. Heather was an estate agent. She was described as a femme fatale.

In 2004, she was put on trial for the murder of Dr Marcus McKenzie (Stefan Dennis).

== Callum Stuart ==
Callum Stuart
- River City character
- Portrayed by: Donald Pirie
- Duration: 2002–2005

Callum Stuart is a fictional character in the BBC Scotland soap, River City played by Donald Pirie.

== Karim Malik ==
Karim Malik
- River City character
- Portrayed by: Kriss Dosanjh
- Duration: 2002–2003
In-universe information
- Occupation: Shopkeeper
- Wife: Hana Malik
- Sons: Nazir Malik
- Daughters: Jamilah Malik; Zara Malik

Karim Malik is a fictional character in the BBC Scotland soap River City played by Kriss Dosanjh. He is an original character.

Karim ran Malik Stores with his wife Hana. The Maliks have three children: Nazir, Jamilah and Zara.

In 2003, they divorce after Karim has an affair with Shazia.

== Hana Malik ==
Hana Malik
- River City character
- Portrayed by: Mamta Kaash
- Duration: 2002–2003
In-universe information
- Occupation: Shopkeeper; Driving instructor
- Husband: Karim Malik
- Sons: Nazir Malik
- Daughters: Jamilah Malik; Zara Malik

Hana Malik is a fictional character in the BBC Scotland soap River City played by Mamta Kaash. She is an original character.

Hana ran Malik Stores with her husband Karim. The Maliks have three children: Nazir, Jamilah and Zara.

== Nazir Malik ==
Nazir Malik
- River City character
- Portrayed by: Riz Abbasi
- Duration: 2002–2003
In-universe information
- Father: Karim Malik
- Mother: Hana Malik
- Sisters: Jamilah Malik; Zara Malik

Nazir Malik is a fictional character in the BBC Scotland soap River City played by Riz Abbasi.

== Jamilah Malik ==
Jamilah Malik
- River City character
- Portrayed by: Laxmi Kathuria
- Duration: 2002–2003
In-universe information
- Father: Karim Malik
- Mother: Hana Malik
- Brothers: Nazir Malik
- Sisters: Zara Malik

Jamilah Malik is a fictional character in the BBC Scotland soap River City played by Laxmi Kathuria.

== Zara Malik ==
Zara Malik
- River City character
- Portrayed by: Shabana Akhtar Bakhsh
- Duration: 2002–2003
In-universe information
- Father: Karim Malik
- Mother: Hana Malik
- Brothers: Nazir Malik
- Sisters: Jamilah Malik

Zara Malik is a fictional character in the BBC Scotland soap River City played by Shabana Akhtar Bakhsh.

== Kirsty Henderson ==
Kirsty Henderson is a fictional character in the BBC Scotland soap River City played by Kari Corbett. She was killed off in 2003.

== Scarlett Spiller ==
Scarlett Bernadette Spiller; previously Adams , Mullen and. O'Hara)is a fictional character in the BBC Scotland soap, River City played by Sally Howitt.

In 2010, Scarlett became embroiled in a battle with her mother Molly O'Hara, who she kept a secret from the rest of her family, this was because of Molly's devious and controlling ways, which led Scarlett's brother and her son Bob O'Hara to walk out of them family home to stand on his own two feet. Scarlett has now tried to stop Molly taking Bob back home to live with her.

Eventually, Scarlett made everyone see her mother's devious ways when CCTV footage surfaced of Molly trashing the community centre in order to get Bob sacked so that he would have to come home with her.

== Nicki Cullen ==
Nicki Cullen
- River City character
- Portrayed by: Jayd Johnson
- Duration: 2004–2010
In-universe information
- Sisters: Zoe Cullen

Nicki Cullen is a fictional character in the BBC Scotland soap, River City played by Jayd Johnson. She appeared from 2004 to 2010. The character left the programme when she moved to New York City.

== Archie Buchanan ==
Archie Buchanan
- River City character
- Portrayed by: Gilly Gilchrist
- Duration: 2003–2008
- First appearance: 26 August 2003
- Last appearance: 19 August 2008
In-universe information
- Other names: Douglas Buchanan
- Mother: Liz Buchanan
- Wife: Gina Buchanan

Archie Buchanan is a fictional character in the BBC Scotland soap, River City played by Gilly Gilchrist.

Archie was involved in drugs and diamonds heists. Archie was 'killed' off in 2007 for the shows fifth anniversary. His mother Liz (Eileen McCallum) bashed him over the head in self defence and his wife Gina (Libby McArthur). They dumped his body with the help of Gina's sister Eileen Donachie (Deirdre Davis). In 2008, he reappeared using the alias Douglas Buchanan.

== Kelly-Marie Adams ==
Kelly-Marie Adams
- River City character
- Portrayed by: Carmen Pieraccini
- Duration: 2003–2008, 2010–2016, 2019, 2024–2026
In-universe information
- Mother: Scarlett O'Hara
- Spouse: Andrew Murray

Kelly-Marie Adams is a fictional character in the BBC Scotland soap, River City played by Carmen Pieraccini. She married footballer Andrew Murray (Sam Heughan).

Kelly-Marie left Shieldinch in 2007 for a new life in Peru. She returned in 2010 and left in 2016. In 2013, she was involved in a child abduction storyline.

She returned in 2024.

== Billy Davis ==
Billy Davis
- River City character
- Portrayed by: Gray O'Brien
- Duration: 2003–2007
In-universe information
- Spouse: Della Davis

Billy Davis (also Davies) is a fictional character in the BBC Scotland soap, River City played by Gray O'Brien.

Billy is the manager of the Moda Vida hair salon.

== Della Davis ==
Della Davis
- River City character
- Portrayed by: Katie McEwan
- Duration: 2003–2007
In-universe information
- Mother: Shirley Henderson
- Spouse: Billy Davis

Della Davis (also Davies) is a fictional character in the BBC Scotland soap, River City played by Katie McEwan. She is the daughter of Shirley Henderson (Barbara Rafferty).

== Ewan Donachie ==
Ewan Donachie
- River City character
- Portrayed by: Alasdair Harvey
- Duration: 2002–2003
In-universe information
- Other relatives: Tommy Donachie

Ewan Donachie is a fictional character in the BBC Scotland soap, River City played by Alasdair Harvey.

Ewan left Shieldinch in 2003 after originally attending Tommy's funeral. He proved a great support for niece, Hazel, but he also loved flirting with the ladies of Shieldinch, especially Joanne Rossi. Just when it looked like he might be ready to take things further with Jo, his partner Helen turned up to dispel any thought he may have about being young, free and single. Ewan returned to Inverness with his partner Helen Gilmore (Gerda Stevenson) after she suffered so much trauma as a result of a miscarriage that she even ran off with Jo's baby, Franco.

== Helen Gilmore ==
Helen Gilmore
- River City character
- Portrayed by: Gerda Stevenson
- Duration: 2002–2003

Helen Gilmore is a fictional character in the BBC Scotland soap, River City played by Gerda Stevenson.

Helen was the partner of Ewan Donachie. She turned up in Shieldinch desperate for Ewan to marry her. She became pregnant, but miscarried. Distraught after the miscarriage, she became convinced that Jo and Ewan were having an affair. As revenge, she kidnapped Jo's baby, Franco, and tried to kill herself when she was caught. She returned to Inverness with Ewan in 2003.

== Greg McManus ==
Greg McManus is a fictional character in the BBC Scotland soap, River City played by George Anton.

== JP Walsh ==
John Paul (JP) Walsh is a fictional character in the BBC Scotland soap, River City played by Gary McCormack. He is a drug dealer known as The Pope.
