= Jim Craig (Scottish footballer) =

Scottish footballer and manager

Jim Craig OBE
Personal information
- Full name: James Philip Craig
- Date of birth: 30 April 1943 (age 83)
- Place of birth: Glasgow, Scotland
- Position: Right back

Senior career*
| Years | Team | Apps | (Gls) |
- Glasgow University
| 1965–1972 | Celtic | 148 | (1) |
| 1972 | Hellenic FC | 16 | (1) |
| 1972–1974 | Sheffield Wednesday | 6 | (0) |
| 1974–1975 | Waterford | 1 | (0) |
| Total | | 161 | (2) |

International career
| 1967 | Scotland | 1 | (0) |

Managerial career
- 1974: Waterford United
- * Club domestic league appearances and goals

James Philip Craig OBE (born 30 April 1943) is a Scottish former footballer, who played as a right back. Most closely associated with Celtic, he was a member of their Lisbon Lions side which won the 1967 European Cup.

== Playing career ==
A student at Glasgow's St Gerard's School, Craig was a Celtic supporter as a child, with the first game he attended being the Saint Mungo Cup final in 1951. He was a Scotland schoolboy international, while his first senior side was the University of Glasgow representative team which he played for while studying dentistry at the institution. He joined Celtic in 1963 on amateur terms so as to allow him to complete his studies, and having done so signed as a full professional in January 1965.

Craig's abilities and style of play matched manager Jock Stein's tactical philosophy and he soon displaced Willie O'Neill and Ian Young as Celtic's regular right back. Stein encouraged his fullbacks to overlap the side's midfield to provide additional support to the forwards, in the style of the modern wing-back role, and in Craig and left back Tommy Gemmell he found willing protagonists.

During his tenure at Parkhead, Craig collected 14 domestic honours (7 League titles, 4 Scottish Cups and 3 League Cups) as well as a European Cup medal in 1967. He made 239 appearances for Celtic scoring 6 goals with his final match being the victorious 1972 Scottish Cup Final. He won one cap for the Scotland national team.

Craig left Celtic to live in South Africa in May 1972, where he played for Hellenic FC, however after six months he returned to Britain. He joined Sheffield Wednesday, with the South Yorkshire side paying Celtic £10,000 compensation, as they had retained his registration. He retired from football in 1973, to concentrate his efforts upon his dentistry career.

== Later years ==
In July 1974 he succeeded Shay Brennan as player-manager of Waterford United. However, in December, after one substitute appearance, Craig informed the club that he was unable to commit to the role due to a "domestic problem".

In the 1980s Craig regularly appeared as a football pundit on the BBC Scotland programme Sportscene. In 2001, he was made Honorary President of the Belfast Shamrock Celtic Supporters Club, which subsequently changed its name to Jim Craig Celtic Supporters Club in 2011.

Craig is now actively part of the Celtic community; he has hosted Channel67, an online streaming service which provides video streams and audio streams of every Celtic match. He regularly updates the Jim Craig CSC blog site.

== Personal life ==
Originally from Leith, his father supported local team Hibernian and the family was later to settle in Craigton, Glasgow.

His son James Craig is a notable rugby player who was capped for the Scotland national rugby union team four times between 1997 and 2001.

== Honours ==
Celtic

- Scottish First Division (7): 1965–66, 1966–67, 1967–68, 1968–69, 1969–70, 1970–71, 1971–72
- Scottish Cup (4): 1966–67, 1968–69, 1970–71, 1971–72
- Scottish League Cup (3): 1967–68, 1968–69, 1969–70
- European Cup: 1966–67
  - Runner-up 1969–70
- Glasgow Cup: 1967–68, 1969–70

Orders

- Craig was appointed Officer of the Order of the British Empire (OBE) in the 2026 New Year Honours for services to Scottish Association Football and to Charity.
