= Route Irish (film) =

2010 drama-thriller film directed by Ken Loach

- French theatrical release poster
- Directed by: Ken Loach
- Written by: Paul Laverty
- Produced by: Rebecca O'Brien
- Starring: Mark Womack; Andrea Lowe; John Bishop
- Cinematography: Chris Menges
- Edited by: Jonathan Morris
- Music by: George Fenton
- Production companies: Sixteen Films; Why Not Productions; Wild Bunch
- Distributed by: Artificial Eye
- Release dates: 20 May 2010 (Cannes Film Festival); 18 March 2011 (United Kingdom)
- Running time: 109 minutes
- Countries: United Kingdom; France; Belgium
- Language: English

Route Irish is a 2010 drama-thriller film directed by Ken Loach and written by Paul Laverty. It is set in Liverpool and focuses on the consequences suffered by private security contractors after fighting in the Iraq War. The title comes from the Baghdad Airport Road, known as "Route Irish". The film was a British-French co-production. It was selected for the main competition at the 2010 Cannes Film Festival.

Philip French, in The Observer, wrote that the film reprises several themes in Loach's films, such as state-sanctioned crime, the brutality of war, the exploitation of the underclass and harsh treatment of native populations.

== Plot ==
The film opens on a ferry in Liverpool, as Fergus Molloy (Mark Womack) remembers the final messages sent to him by his lifelong friend Frankie (John Bishop), whose funeral he is to attend. The night before, Fergus unseals his friend's coffin to see his friend's badly injured corpse. At the funeral, Haynes (Jack Fortune) a director of the private military company that Fergus and Frankie worked for, gives a eulogy praising Frankie and describing military contractors as the "unsung heroes of our time". Afterwards, Haynes and Walker (Geoff Bell) explain to Frankie's family the circumstances of his death, though Fergus remains embittered and closely questions the two men. Later at the wake, Fergus attacks Haynes when he sees him distributing his business card to enlisted soldiers there.

Marisol (Najwa Nimri) bequeaths a package to Fergus, which Frankie had entrusted to a mutual friend with a note asking it be given to Fergus. With the help of Harim (Talib Rasool), an Iraqi musician, Fergus discovers a video on the phone which shows a member of Frankie's team killing an innocent Iraqi family a few weeks before his death. Fergus becomes suspicious, and has friends still working for the firm in Iraq investigate the incident, but it has not been recorded.

== Cast ==
- Mark Womack as Fergus Molloy
- Andrea Lowe as Rachel
- John Bishop as Frankie
- Geoff Bell as Alex Walker
- Jack Fortune as Andrew Haynes
- Talib Rasool as Harim
- Craig Lundberg as Craig
- Trevor Williams as Nelson
- Russel Anderson as Tommy
- Jamie Michie as Jamie
- Stephen Lord as Steve
- Najwa Nimri as Marisol
- Anthony Schumacher as Andy
- Tess as Tess the three legged dog

== Production ==
Ken Loach's company Sixteen Films co-produced the film with France's Why Not Productions and Wild Bunch. It received funding from France 2 and North West Vision Media. Principal shooting took place on location in Liverpool with one week of shooting in Jordan, standing in for Iraq. The film reunited Loach with cinematographer Chris Menges who had worked on several of the director's films in the past, including Kes. The character Craig was played by actual Iraq war veteran Craig Lundberg, whom the writer had encountered while doing research. The waterboarding scene was performed for real on actor Trevor Williams, after the results had not been satisfactory during earlier attempts at merely staging the act. Despite the knowledge that he was safe, the filming left the actor deeply disturbed and caused "weeks of panic attacks". For a Ken Loach film, Route Irish uses an unusually high amount of stunt scenes and pyrotechnics.

== Release ==
Route Irish was first shown on 20 May at the 2010 Cannes Film Festival, in competition as part of the official selection. According to festival general Thierry Fremaux, the film was not finished in time for the ordinary cut-off date. However, producer Rebecca O'Brien submitted it anyway as soon as it was ready, and it was accepted as a late addition only two days before the festival started. Ken Loach said in an interview that the team never considered having it ready for Cannes, but when it turned out that they were ahead of the schedule the French co-producers pushed for a submission. The film was released generally in France on 16 March 2011, and on the 18th in the United Kingdom. It was nominated for a Magritte Award in the category of Best Foreign Film in Coproduction in 2012, but lost to Romantics Anonymous.

== Reception ==
On the review aggregator website Rotten Tomatoes, 72% of 29 critics' reviews are positive.
