= Joyce Falconer =

Scottish actress

- Born: 1970 (age 55–56); Torry, Aberdeen, Scotland
- Occupation: actress
- Years active: 2002–present

Joyce Falconer (born 1970) is a Scottish actress. Falconer is best known for her portrayal of Roisin McIntyre in the BBC Scotland soap opera River City. An original cast member from 2002 to 2008, she reprised the role from 2021 onwards, as the shows longest serving female cast member.

== Early life and education ==
Falconer was born and raised in Torry, Aberdeen. She attended Tullos Primary School and Torry Academy.

== Career ==
Falconer trained as an actress at the Royal Conservatoire of Scotland in Glasgow.

Falconer joined the BBC soap opera River City in 2002 playing the character of Roisin McIntyre, becoming one of the show's most iconic characters until her departure in 2008. Her character was compared to Bet Lynch from Coronation Street. She re-joined the cast in 2021, reprising her role.

In 2009, she went on tour with the National Theatre of Scotland. She has played Elvis in the Edinburgh festival.

Her other television roles include Taggart, Crimefile, Cardiac Arrest and Finney. In 2021, she joined the cast of Beauty and the Beast at Aberdeen Performing Arts.

== Personal life ==
Falconer speaks the Doric dialect of Scots. She is married to fellow River City cast member David McGowan.
