= Rebecca O'Brien =

British film producer (born 1957)

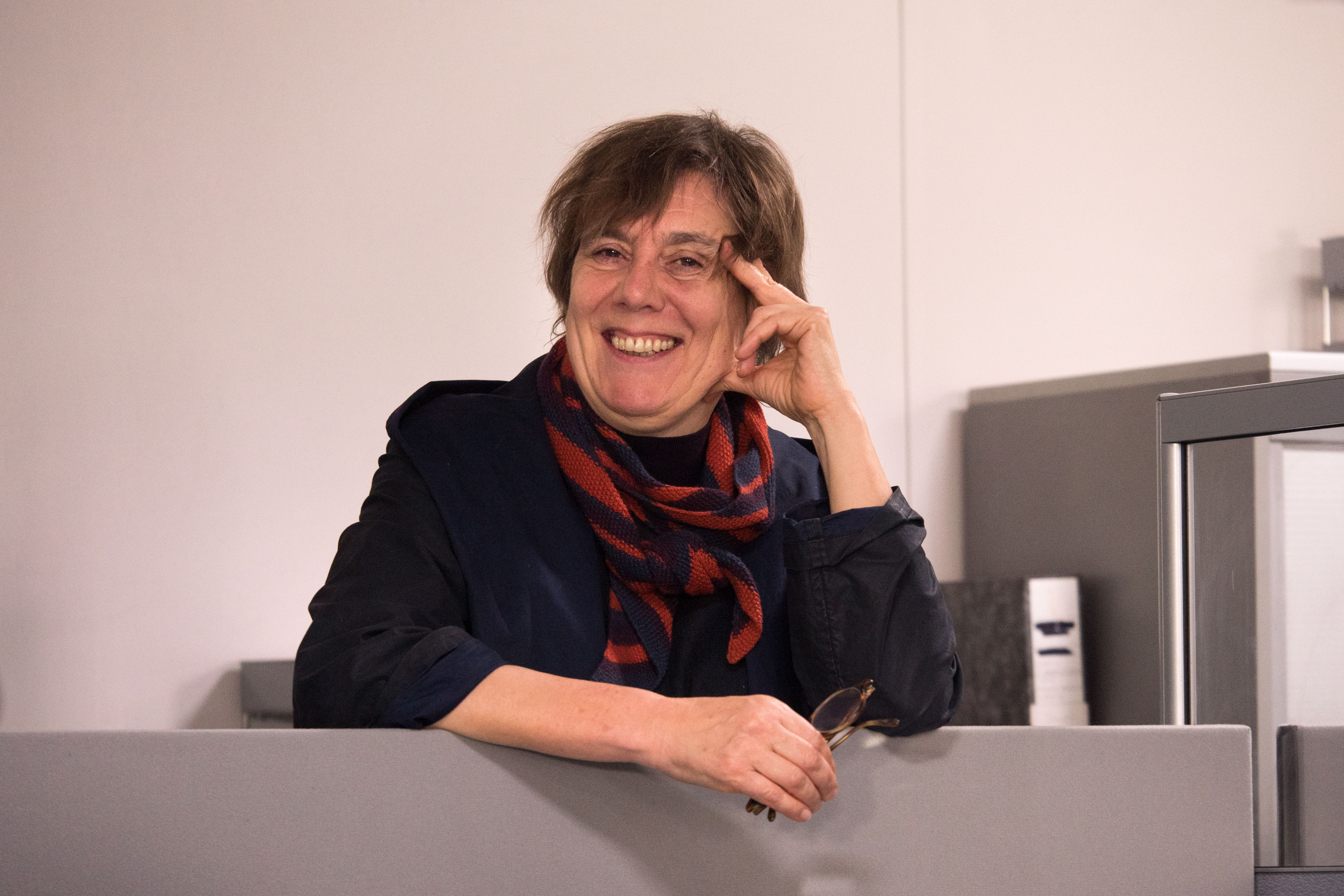
- O'Brien in 2015
- Born: 1957 (age 68–69); London, England
- Occupation: Film producer
- Website: www.sixteenfilms.co.uk

Rebecca O'Brien (born 25 October 1957) is a British film producer known for her work with co-producer Ken Loach and scriptwriter Paul Laverty. She has twice been the recipient of the Palme d'Or award at the Cannes Film Festival. She has also won a BAFTA Award for Outstanding British Film.

== Early life ==
O'Brien was born in London, England and raised in the town of Peebles in Scotland.

== Career ==
O'Brien's career began in theatre and children's television and her early cinema work includes My Beautiful Laundrette (1985), on which she was location manager, and Bean (1997), which she co-produced.

She was co-producer on Ken Loach's Hidden Agenda (1990) and sole producer on his Land and Freedom (1995) and on many of his subsequent films.

Together with Loach and scriptwriter Paul Laverty, she runs the production company Sixteen Films, formed in 2002.

Two of O'Brien and Loach's films, The Wind That Shakes the Barley (2006) and I, Daniel Blake (2016), received the Palme d'Or award at the Cannes Film Festival. Laverty, Loach and O'Brien received an "outstanding contribution" award from BAFTA Scotland in November 2016 and the trio won the 2017 BAFTA Award for Outstanding British Film, for I, Daniel Blake.

== Leadership roles ==
O'Brien served as a member of the board of the UK Film Council, until that body's dissolution in 2010, and of the UK Film Industry Training Board. She is a board member of PACT, the trade body for independent film production companies in the United Kingdom, and of the European Film Academy. She is also a member of The British Screen Advisory Council.

== Filmography ==
- 1987: Friendship's Death
- 1990: Hidden Agenda
- 1995: Land and Freedom
- 1997: Bean
- 1998: My Name is Joe
- 2000: Bread and Roses
- 2001: The Navigators
- 2002: Sweet Sixteen
- 2002: 11'09"01 September 11
- 2004: Ae Fond Kiss...
- 2005: Tickets
- 2006: The Wind That Shakes the Barley
- 2007: It's a Free World...
- 2009: Looking for Eric
- 2010: Route Irish
- 2012: The Angels' Share
- 2014: Jimmy's Hall
- 2016: I, Daniel Blake
- 2016: Versus: The Life and Films of Ken Loach
- 2019: Sorry We Missed You
- 2024: Harvest
