= Steve Evets =

English actor and musician (born 1959)

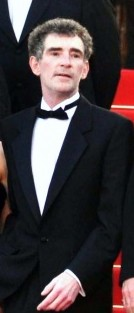
- Evets during the presentation of Looking for Eric at the Cannes film festival.
- Born: Steven Murphy; 26 July 1959 (age 67); Salford, Lancashire, England
- Occupations: Actor, musician

Steve Evets (born Steven Murphy; 26 July 1959) is an English actor and musician, who found fame for his leading role in the 2009 film Looking for Eric.

== Personal life ==
Born in Salford, Lancashire, Evets joined the Merchant Navy after leaving school, but was kicked out after three years, after jumping ship twice in Japan and spending his eighteenth birthday in a Bombay brothel.

In 1987, Evets was injured in a pub brawl and spent time on a life support machine. He was stabbed through the liver, lung and diaphragm, was glassed in the face and had his throat cut.

Evets briefly worked delivering pipes alongside his acting career, and as an electrician. As there was already a Steve Murphy on the books of Equity, he decided on the palindromic stage name Steve Evets, "The first thing that popped into my head was 'Steve' backwards ... so I put that on the form."

== Career ==
Evets's early acting work included a street theatre company formed with two friends. He moved into theatre work, and had small roles in several television series such as See No Evil: The Moors Murders, Casualty, Life on Mars, The Cops, Shameless, and Emmerdale.

In between acting roles, he worked under the name Adolph Chip-pan, performing political comedy poetry in Manchester. He also worked as a musician, and was introduced to Mark E. Smith of the Fall in the mid-1990s, leading to Evets performing his poetry at some Fall gigs. When Smith found that Evets could play bass guitar, he was drafted into the band in Turkey after previous bassist Jim Watts had been sacked. Evets played in The Fall between 2000 and 2002, before leaving to front his own band, Dr Freak's Padded Cell, which he described as "electronic dance music with sort of very political overtones", even getting Smith to provide guest vocals on one track; Evets made a video for the track and posted it on YouTube, much to the dislike of Smith, ending their friendship.

His first major film role came in 2008, playing a terminally-ill alcoholic who uses a wheelchair opposite Robert Carlyle, in Summer. He followed this with the lead role in Ken Loach's 2009 film, Looking for Eric.

In 2010 to 2014, he appeared as the homeless congregation member Colin in the acclaimed TV series Rev. He played Morty in Vertigo Films' 2012 low-budget horror film The Facility (originally titled Guinea Pigs) directed by Ian Clark. He starred in a music video for Salford-based band Emperor Zero's 2011 song "Man with Red Eyes".

Steve Evets appeared in the first three episodes of the first series of BBC Three zombie drama In the Flesh, but did not return for series 2 due to his character's death.

In 2015, Evets appeared as Jim Smith in the BBC TV series Death in Paradise episode 4.5 and he also appeared as Bertrand in the BBC TV series The Musketeers episode 2.5 "The Return". In February 2016, he appeared in the BBC One drama series Moving On. From 2019 Steve joined the cast of the popular series Brassic (Sky TV) as a foul-mouthed Farmer called Jim. There are currently 6 seasons of Brassic with the seventh being filmed in 2024.

== Filmography ==
Year	Title	Role	Notes
2005	Shameless	Paddy	
2007	Life on Mars	Dicky Fingers	
2008	Summer	Daz	
2009	Looking for Eric	Eric Bishop	
2009	A Boy Called Dad	Mr. Whippy	
2010–2014	Rev	Colin Lambert	
2010	Robin Hood	Ragged Messenger	
2010	Brighton Rock	Mr. Wilson	
2011	Pirates of the Caribbean: On Stranger Tides	Purser	
2011	Wuthering Heights	Joseph	
2012	The Facility	Morty	
2012	Anna Karenina	Theodore	
2012	Spike Island	Eric Titchfield	
2012	Shameless	Brooksy	
2013	The Selfish Giant	'Price Drop' Swift	
2013	In the Flesh	Bill Macy	
2015	North v South	Alf	
2017	The Man with the Iron Heart	Jan Zelenka	
2017	Apostasy	Brother Terry	
2017	The Wrong Side of Town	Mark Jessop	
2019	A Very British Christmas	Ben Ritchie	
2019	White Gold	Barry / Derek	
2019–2025	Brassic	Farmer Jim	
2026	Coronation Street	Doug Ramsey	
