= My Name Is Joe =

- DVD cover
- Directed by: Ken Loach
- Written by: Paul Laverty
- Produced by: Ulrich Felsberg; Rebecca O'Brien
- Starring: Peter Mullan; Louise Goodall; Gary Lewis; Lorraine McIntosh; David McKay; Anne-Marie Kennedy; David Hayman
- Cinematography: Barry Ackroyd
- Edited by: Jonathan Morris
- Music by: George Fenton
- Distributed by: Film Four
- Release dates: 15 May 1998 (Cannes Film Festival); 6 November 1998 (United Kingdom)
- Running time: 105 minutes
- Country: United Kingdom
- Languages: English, Scots
- Box office: $778,347

My Name Is Joe is a 1998 British romantic drama film directed by Ken Loach. The film stars Peter Mullan as Joe Kavanagh, an unemployed recovering alcoholic in Glasgow, Scotland, who meets and falls in love with a health visitor, played by Louise Goodall. David McKay plays his troubled friend Liam. The film's title is a reference to the ritualised greeting performed in Alcoholics Anonymous meetings, as portrayed in the film's opening scene.

The movie was mainly filmed in the council estates of Glasgow and filling small roles with local residents, many of whom had drug and criminal pasts.

The film won awards in many film festivals, including Best Actor for Mullan at the 1998 Cannes Film Festival. The British Film Institute ranked the film 91st in its 1999 BFI Top 100 British films list.

== Plot ==
The film begins with Joe Kavanagh at an Alcoholics Anonymous meeting, relaying an experience from his past. On the way to pick up Liam, a former junkie whom Joe is fond of, for a football match, they are cut off by Sarah, a health visitor serving Liam, his girlfriend Sabine and their son Scott. Dropping off Liam after the match, Joe watches as Liam and Sabine have a confrontation outside their home with several thugs. He later spots Sarah outside a health centre and flirts with her, offering to help her with her wallpaper. While at Sarah's, Joe spots a social worker taking photographs of him working, which violates his welfare policy. Joe grows enraged and threatens the social worker, attacking the car with his painting supplies. Later while eating dinner, Joe tells Sarah that he is a recovering alcoholic.

Joe is called before social services to explain his alleged violation of welfare policy, where he learns that Sarah intervened on his behalf, saying he was working as a favour and not for money. Joe visits the health centre to thank Sarah for intervening and asks her on a date. She is apprehensive about going on a date with Joe based on his strange behavior. After the date, Sarah locks her keys out of the flat and Joe suggests that she stay with him, stressing that he is not trying to sleep with her. Joe shares stories of his past with Sarah, and she presses him about why he stopped drinking. Joe is hesitant at first, but explains that he stopped drinking because he brutally beat a previous romantic partner while drunk.

The next day at a football match, the same thugs who hassled Liam at home arrive at the pitch and assault him. Liam claims it was in retaliation for a bar fight, but Joe worries that he has relapsed on drugs. At the health centre, Sabine causes a scene by refusing to put out her cigarette, and later captures Sarah's attention when she is caught stealing a prescription pad. At home, Liam confronts Sabine, who lied about where she has been, and accuses her of sleeping with other men after finding condoms in her purse. Later, Joe arrives to find Sabine preparing to inject heroin. He reluctantly helps her inject, and she says the thugs have taken Liam to drug dealer and crook McGowan, whom Joe knows from his youth. Liam tells Joe that he stopped dealing heroin when he went to prison, but that Sabine dealt drugs in his place and has begun using her own product, leading them to be in debt to McGowan. Liam tells Joe that McGowan's thugs have threatened to cripple him if he cannot repay the money. Joe threatens McGowan over this, but McGowan proposes that Joe deal drugs to repay Liam's debt. Joe and Liam return home, and he lies to Sarah that the matter has been sorted.

After an intimate night with Sarah, Joe goes to Kintyre to pick up a car that is implied to contain drugs. In a later scene, Joe gives Sarah a pair of earrings and a ring, telling her that he loves her. Sarah responds that she does not want the ring and Joe cannot understand what he has done wrong, throwing the ring into the river in a fit of rage. Later, she arrives at his door and apologizes. Later, Sarah tells her co-worker Maggie that she is pregnant. Sarah meets with Sabine and Liam in a park, where Sabine inadvertently exposes Joe's lie about paying off McGowan. Liam complicates things further by telling Sarah that Joe simply got an extension on their payments, and Sarah accuses him of lying. She goes to Joe's flat and presses him for more information about his dealings with McGowan, expressing her concerns. Joe seems to have placated her, but Liam arrives abruptly and warns Joe about Sarah's questions. She is enraged that Joe is dealing drugs, but he insists that he lacks the same resources as her and had no other way to help Liam. Sarah leaves the apartment in tears after discovering her presents were bought with an advance from McGowan.

Joe goes to Liam's flat and gives him money to leave town, saying he will not complete the second job for McGowan. After this, he goes to Sarah's but fails to reconcile with her. At McGowan's snooker hall, Joe says he will not complete the job. McGowan brushes him off and tries to get Joe thrown out. After one of McGowan's thugs makes lewd comments about Sarah, Joe flies into a rage and brutally beats up all of McGowan's men. Knowing he has marked himself for death, he buys liquor and returns home. Later, Liam arrives and finds Joe in a drunken stupor. He tells Joe that McGowan's men are after both of them, but Joe drunkenly insults Liam for not following his instructions and refuses to move. Backed into a corner, Liam ties a rope around his neck and jumps out of the window. Joe awakes and tries to pull him back up, but is too inebriated to lift Liam, who dies. Joe spots Sarah at Liam's burial and the two walk off together.

== Cast ==
- Peter Mullan – Joe Kavanagh
- Louise Goodall – Sarah Downie
- David McKay – Liam
- Annemarie Kennedy – Sabine
- David Hayman – McGowan
- Gary Lewis – Shanks
- Lorraine McIntosh – Maggie
- Scott Hannah – Scott
- David Peacock – Hooligan
- Gordon McMurray – Scrag
- James McHendry – Perfume
- Paul Clark – Zulu
- Stephen McCole – Mojo
- Simon Macallum – Robbo

== Reception ==
The film grossed £253,530 ($423,395) in the United Kingdom. It grossed $354,952 in the United States and Canada, for a worldwide total in excess of $778,347.

On the review aggregator website Rotten Tomatoes, 89% of 27 critics' reviews are positive, with an average rating of 7.4/10. Roger Ebert gave the film 3 and a half stars out of 4, describing Loach's screenplay as "ingenious in bringing together the romance, the crime elements, and the challenge of being sober in a community where drink and drugs provide the primary pastime (and employment)."

== See also ==
- BFI Top 100 British films
