= David Goodall (director) =

- Born: 19 November 1964; Edinburgh, Scotland
- Died: 27 September 2023 (aged 58)
- Occupations: Actor, composer, filmmaker
- Years active: 1980–2023

David Goodall (19 November 1964 – 27 September 2023) was a Scottish director, producer, composer, fight director and actor.

== Life and career ==
Goodall was born in Edinburgh, Scotland on 19 November 1964.

His music can be heard on Nick Nairn's Wild Harvest, "Zig Zag" and "Saorsa" (BBC) as well as Artery and Eikon (ITV). Film credits include Fallen Angels, To Have And To Hold and In The Dark. His recent film scores include Crush. and Changed Days.

As an actor, he has played many roles in console games including Haven, Defender and Dreamfall. He has voiced advertisements in English and Italian, and acted as forensics officer Eliot Bothwell in the long-running BBC Radio 4 police series P Division, as well as Lady MacBeth of Mtsensk (BBC Radio 3), and the narrator for the documentary Last of the Scottish Wildcats. He played Angus Dobie in The Angel's Share by Ken Loach.

Goodall directed fights with Tony Curran on Red Road, with Kevin McKidd on That Old One and with Peter Mullan and Paddy Considine on Dog Altogether. He is also credited on Rebus and Taggart. He worked as assistant stunt co-ordinator on the BBC show, Phoo Action with Dave Forman.

From 1996, Goodall worked as a producer and director at Soundsmove Facilities in Scotland.

Goodall directed Crush, a film highlighting abuse in teenage relationships, and Changed Days, a film about a man suffering from dementia.

David Goodall died on 27 September 2023, at the age of 58.

== Awards ==
- Best UK Film Under 60min at the Swansea Bay Film Festival - May 2011
- Best International Short Film in Los Angeles International Film Festival - July 2011
- Best Director at the Los Angeles International Film Festival - July 2011
- Best Director at the New York International Film Festival - April 2011
- Best UK Film over 20min at the International Film Festival of Ireland
