= Neil Hunter =

South African cricketer (born 1936)

Personal information
- Born: 10 May 1936 (age 90); East London, South Africa
- Source: Cricinfo, 6 December 2020

Neil Hunter (born 10 May 1936) is a South African cricketer. He played in ten first-class matches for Border from 1961/62 to 1968/69.

== See also ==
- List of Border representative cricketers
