= Bread and Roses (2000 film) =

2000 film by Ken Loach

- British theatrical release poster
- Directed by: Ken Loach
- Written by: Paul Laverty
- Produced by: Rebecca O'Brien
- Starring: Pilar Padilla; Adrien Brody; Elpidia Carrillo
- Cinematography: Barry Ackroyd
- Edited by: Jonathan Morris
- Music by: George Fenton
- Production companies: British Screen; BSkyB; Cineart; Filmcooperative Zürich; Parallax Pictures; BiM Distribution; Alta Films; BAC Films; Road Movies Filmproduktion; Tornasol Films
- Distributed by: FilmFour Distributors (United Kingdom); Alta Films (Spain)
- Release dates: 10 May 2000 (CFF); 11 May 2001 (UK)
- Running time: 110 minutes
- Countries: United Kingdom; Germany; Spain
- Languages: English; Spanish
- Box office: $706,876

Bread and Roses is a 2000 drama film directed by Ken Loach, starring Pilar Padilla, Adrien Brody and Elpidia Carrillo. The plot deals with the struggle of poorly paid janitorial workers in Los Angeles and their fight for better working conditions and the right to unionize. It is based on the "Justice for Janitors" campaign of the Service Employees International Union (SEIU), and the lead union organizer, Sam Shapiro, is based on SEIU organizer Jono Shaffer.

The film is critical of inequalities in the United States. Health insurance in particular is highlighted and it is also stated in the film that the pay of cleaners and other low paying jobs has declined in recent years.

The film's name, "Bread and Roses", derives from the 1912 textile strike in Lawrence, Massachusetts. Though the phrase comes from a 1911 poem by James Oppenheim (which was, in turn, based on a speech given by Rose Schneiderman), it is commonly associated with the Lawrence strike, which united dozens of immigrant communities, led to a large extent by women, under the leadership of the Industrial Workers of the World.

== Plot ==
Maya, a recently arrived undocumented immigrant in Los Angeles, is eager to build a new life away from her old one, where she briefly worked in a bar. She desires to work in a high-rise building as a janitor alongside her sister Rosa. Once employed, Maya discovers the stark disparity in wages and working conditions that the janitors, many of them immigrants, face daily.

Soon after starting her job, Maya encounters Sam, a janitor's union organizer. Sam's mission is to sign up workers in the building for the union, hoping to address their grievances. Maya is receptive to Sam's cause, seeing an opportunity for better wages and conditions. However, her sister Rosa is skeptical, fearful of losing their jobs amidst the push for unionization. They stage a protest at a house-warming party for a prominent Hollywood agency located in the building they clean. The janitors' plight becomes a point of contention within the building and draws attention to the exploitation many of them face.

== Cast ==
- Pilar Padilla as Maya
- Adrien Brody as Sam Shapiro
- Elpidia Carrillo as Rosa
- Jack McGee as Bert
- Monica Rivas as Simona
- Frank Davila as Luis
- Lillian Hurst as Anna
- Mayron Payes as Ben
- Maria Orellana as Berta
- Elena Antonenko as Maria
- Olga Gorelik as Olga
- George Lopez as Perez
- Blake Clark as Mr. Griffin
- Pepe Serna as Restauranteur
- Tom Gilroy as Director of Campaigns
- Neal Baer as Doctor

Uncredited party guests

- Tim Roth
- Ron Perlman
- William Atherton
- Vanessa Angel
- Benicio del Toro
- Oded Fehr
- Chris Penn
- Robin Tunney
- Samuel West
- Lara Belmont
- Stuart Gordon
- Stephanie Zimbalist

== Reception ==
=== Critical response ===
On the review aggregator website Rotten Tomatoes, 67% of 63 critics' reviews are positive. The website's consensus reads: "Bread and Roses has powerful moments, but it also sometimes descends into preachiness." Metacritic, which uses a weighted average, assigned the film a score of 57 out of 100, based on 19 critics, indicating "mixed or average" reviews.

=== Awards and nominations ===
The film was nominated for the Palme d'Or (Golden Palm) at the 2000 Cannes Film Festival and won the Jury Award at the Temecula Valley International Film Festival in 2000.

In 2001, it was nominated for the Artios award of the Casting Society of America, for the British Independent Film Awards for Best British Independent Film, Best Director and Best Screenplay, and won the Phoenix Prize at the Santa Barbara International Film Festival.

In 2002, it was nominated for four ALMA Awards, of which it won the Outstanding Supporting Actress in a Motion Picture (Elpidia Carrillo) and also won the Imagen Award for Best Theatrical Feature Film of the Imagen Foundation Awards.
