= Lawless Heart =

2001 film by Tom Hunsinger and Neil Hunter

- Theatrical release poster
- Directed by: Tom Hunsinger; Neil Hunter
- Written by: Tom Hunsinger; Neil Hunter
- Produced by: Martin Pope
- Starring: Bill Nighy; Tom Hollander; Clémentine Célarié; Douglas Henshall; Ellie Haddington; Sukie Smith
- Cinematography: Sean Bobbitt
- Release date: 5 August 2001 (Locarno)
- Running time: 99 minutes
- Country: United Kingdom
- Language: English

Lawless Heart is a 2001 British film directed by Tom Hunsinger and Neil Hunter. It had its world premiere at the Locarno Film Festival, where it won the Prix CICAE / Arte. It also won Best Screenplay at the British Independent Film Awards in 2002, where it was additionally nominated for Best British Independent Film, Best Director, Best Actor (Bill Nighy) and Best Technical Achievement (editor Scott Thomas). At the Evening Standard British Film Awards the next year, it was awarded Best Screenplay.

The film is set amidst the coastal marshes around Maldon, Essex. The film's structure was inspired by Eric Rohmer's Les Rendez-vous de Paris.

== Plot ==
A group of friends, lovers and relatives assemble for the funeral of Stuart. Devastated by Stuart's death, his brother-in-law, lover and best friend decide to take their lives in hand. Dan is a faithful and loving father and husband, until the day he meets Corinne. This buxom and sublime Frenchwoman seduces Dan with her honesty and hedonism, so much so that he wonders if he hasn't missed out on life. Nick, a gay restaurant owner, begins a relationship with a high-spirited young woman right after losing his lover, Stuart. When their apparently innocent relationship takes a more intimate turn, Nick is troubled by his feelings for his female comrade. Tim, carefree and charismatic, comes home after eight years abroad. Still looking for that "elusive something" that has been missing in his life, Tim finds it in a woman who works in a fashion boutique. But confronted with his future for the first time, the only thing that stands in the way is this unknown woman's past.

== Cast ==
- Bill Nighy as Dan
- Tom Hollander as Nick
- Douglas Henshall as Tim
- Clémentine Célarié as Corrine
- Ellie Haddington as Judy
- Sukie Smith as Charlie
- Josephine Butler as Leah
- Stuart Laing as David
- Sally Hurst as Michelle
- David Coffey as Stuart
- Barney Clark as James

== Reception ==
As of August 2020, 87% of the 53 reviews compiled by Rotten Tomatoes are positive, with an average score of 7.2/10. The website's critics consensus reads: "Unconventional and refreshing, this strikingly un-Hollywood film takes a quiet and heartbreaking look at the warmth and inspiration of friendships lost." Metacritic, which uses a weighted average, assigned the film a score of 75 out of 100, based on 25 critics, indicating "generally favorable" reviews.
