= Paul Laverty =

Scottish and Irish screenwriter (born 1957)

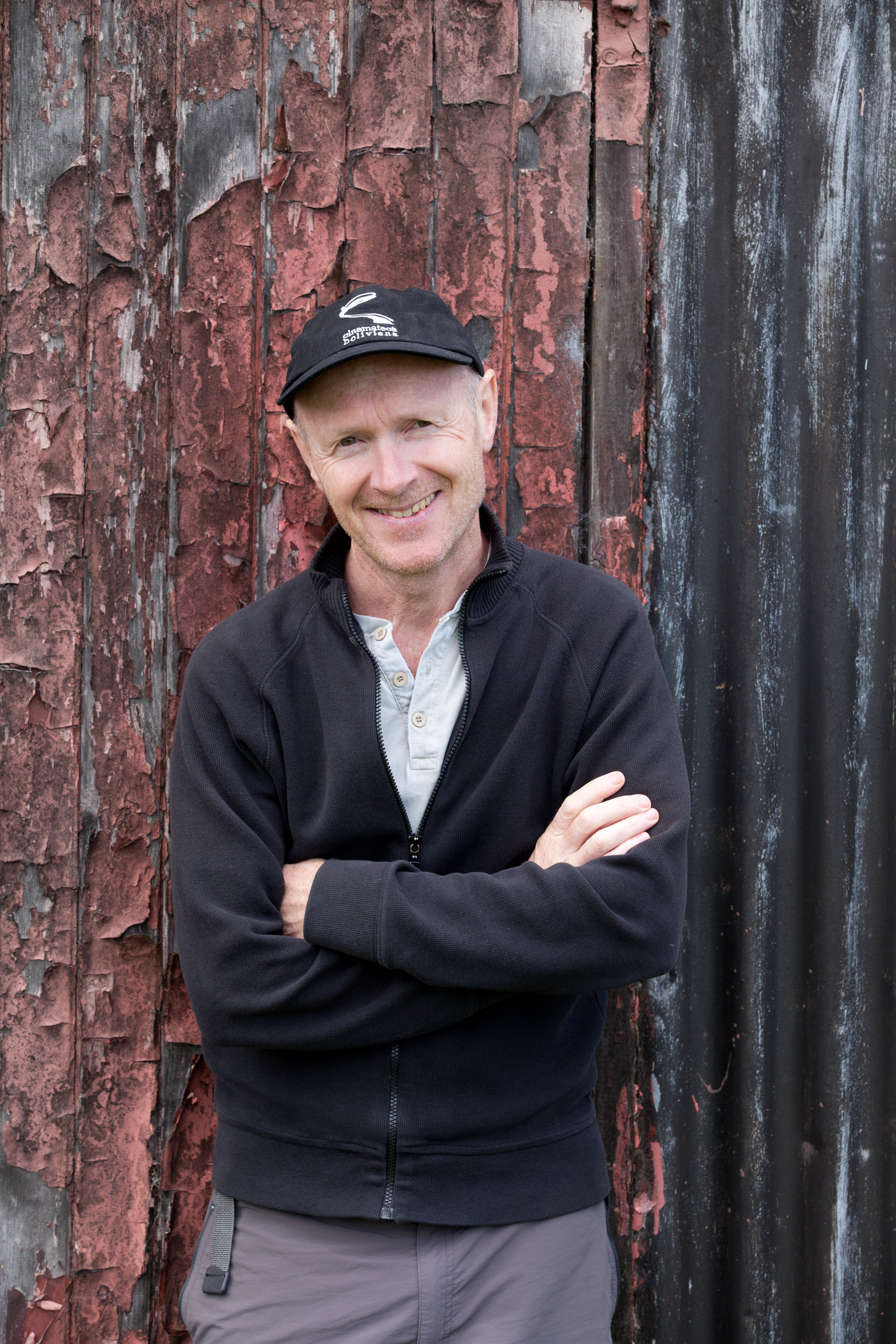
- Paul Laverty on the set of The Angels' Share in 2011
- Born: 1957 (age 68–69); Calcutta, India
- Occupations: Screenwriter, lawyer

Paul Laverty (born 1957) is an Irish and Scottish screenwriter and lawyer. He is best known for his collaborations with Ken Loach, including the screenplays for the Palme d'Or winning films The Wind That Shakes the Barley (2006) and I, Daniel Blake (2016).

For Sweet Sixteen (2002), he won the Cannes Film Festival Award for Best Screenplay. For It's a Free World... (2007), he won Golden Osella for Best Screenplay. For I, Daniel Blake he won the BAFTA Award for Outstanding British Film and was nominated for the BAFTA Award for Best Original Screenplay.

== Early life ==
Paul Laverty was born in Calcutta, West Bengal, to an Irish mother and Scottish father. He was educated at All Souls' School in Wigtown where he grew up. He obtained a philosophy degree at the Gregorian University in Rome while studying for the priesthood at the Pontifical Scots College. Thereafter he obtained a law degree at Strathclyde Law School, in Glasgow.

During the mid-1980s, he travelled to Nicaragua and lived there for almost three years. He worked for a Nicaraguan domestic human rights organization which provided hard evidence of human rights abuses during the war between the elected Nicaraguan Government (The Sandinistas) and the United States backed "Contras" in which the subject of human rights became highly contested. Every major human rights organization, including Amnesty and Americas Watch, accused the U.S.-backed contras of systematic abuse against Nicaraguan civilians.

He travelled to the war zones and obtained corroborated eyewitness accounts which were passed on to international human rights organizations. He also travelled widely in El Salvador, during its civil war, and Guatemala, too. His interests in Latin American affairs continued much later with long research trips to Chiapas in Mexico, and along the US-Mexican border concentrating on the city of Juárez.

== Career ==
After his time in Central America Laverty made contact with director Ken Loach for whom he wrote Carla's Song (1996), his first screenplay, which starred Robert Carlyle. For his acting in My Name is Joe (1998), Peter Mullan won the Best Actor award at the 2000 Cannes Film Festival. Bread and Roses (2000), detailing the experiences of migrant labour, was shot in Los Angeles, and featured Adrien Brody in a leading role. Laverty's next script, Sweet Sixteen (2002) won best screenplay award in the 2002 Cannes Film Festival. He won the Golden Osella for It's a Free World... (2007).

They both collaborated on The Wind That Shakes the Barley (2006) which concerns Irish War of Independence in early 1920s. The film won the Palme d'Or at the 2006 Cannes Film Festival. Laverty has written eight full-length feature scripts and one short directed by Ken Loach. Both work closely with producer Rebecca O'Brien. Loach's comedy featuring the French footballer Eric Cantona, Looking for Eric (2009), is a collaborative effort with Laverty, as is his film about mercenaries in Iraq, Route Irish (2010).

== Personal life ==
Laverty has been in a relationship with Spanish filmmaker and actress Icíar Bollaín since 1995, after meeting on the set of Ken Loach's Land and Freedom (1995). The couple live in Edinburgh with their three children.

On August 25, 2025, Laverty was arrested under the Terrorism Act for "showing support for a proscribed organization" during a Free Palestine protest in Edinburgh. According to reports, the reason for the arrest was wearing a T-shirt that said "Genocide in Palestine, time to take Action" that allegedly supported the banned organization Palestine Action.

== Filmography ==
Year	Title	Director(s)	Notes
1996	Carla's Song	Ken Loach	
1998	My Name is Joe	Ken Loach	
2000	Bread and Roses	Ken Loach	
2002	Sweet Sixteen	Ken Loach	
2002	11′09″01 September 11	Ken Loach	UK Segment only
2004	Ae Fond Kiss ...	Ken Loach	
2005	Tickets	Ken Loach	UK Segment only
2006	Cargo	Clive Gordon	
2006	The Wind That Shakes the Barley	Ken Loach	
2007	It's a Free World...	Ken Loach	
2009	Looking for Eric	Ken Loach	
2010	Route Irish	Ken Loach	
2010	Even the Rain	Icíar Bollaín	
2012	The Angels' Share	Ken Loach	
2014	Jimmy's Hall	Ken Loach	
2016	I, Daniel Blake	Ken Loach	
2016	The Olive Tree	Icíar Bollaín	
2018	Yuli: The Carlos Acosta Story	Icíar Bollaín	
2019	Sorry We Missed You	Ken Loach	
2023	The Old Oak	Ken Loach	

== Accolades ==
In 2002, Laverty won the Cannes Film Festival Award for Best Screenplay for the film Sweet Sixteen. In 2016, he was nominated for the British Independent Film Award for Best Screenplay.
