= Sweet Sixteen (2002 film) =

2002 film by Ken Loach

- Theatrical release poster
- Directed by: Ken Loach
- Screenplay by: Paul Laverty
- Produced by: Rebecca O'Brien
- Starring: Martin Compston; Annmarie Fulton; William Ruane
- Cinematography: Barry Ackroyd
- Edited by: Jonathan Morris
- Music by: George Fenton
- Production companies: Sixteen Films; Road Movies Filmproduktion; Tornasol Films; Alta Films; Scottish Screen; BBC Films
- Distributed by: Icon Film Distribution (United Kingdom); Ottfilm (Germany); Alta Films (Spain)
- Release dates: 21 May 2002 (Cannes); 4 October 2002 (United Kingdom); 10 January 2003 (Spain); 26 June 2003 (Germany)
- Running time: 106 minutes
- Countries: United Kingdom; Germany; Spain
- Languages: English; Scots
- Box office: $3.9 million

Sweet Sixteen is a 2002 coming-of-age crime drama film directed by Ken Loach. Set in Scotland, the film tells the story of Liam, a teenage boy from a troubled background who dreams of starting afresh with his mother as soon as she has completed her prison term. Liam's attempts to raise money for the two of them are set against the backdrop of the Inverclyde towns of Greenock, Port Glasgow and the coast at Gourock.

The film is an international co-production of the United Kingdom, Germany and Spain. It is often shown with subtitles because, as with many of Loach's films, the dialogue is extensively in a local dialect, in this case the Inverclyde variant of Scottish English and Scots, a similar dialect and accent to Glaswegian.

== Plot ==
In the Scottish town of Greenock, teenager Liam and his friends exemplify the violent ned subculture: they no longer attend school, and instead wander aimlessly all day long. They earn money by illegally selling untaxed cigarettes in a pub. Liam's mother, Jean, is currently in prison for a crime actually committed by her boyfriend Stan, who works as a drug dealer with Liam's grandfather, Rab. Jean is due to be released in a few weeks, in time for Liam's 16th birthday.

Stan and Rab attempt to force Liam to smuggle drugs to Jean during a prison visit. Refusing to cooperate, Liam is beaten up by Stan and eventually thrown out of Rab's flat. Liam then moves in with his older sister Chantelle in nearby Port Glasgow. She urges Liam to do something constructive with his life.

When Liam takes Chantelle's young son Calum for a walk along the Greenock Esplanade, his friend Pinball arrives in a stolen car and insists on taking them joyriding along the coast. They drive up through the Cloch caravan park where Liam sees a caravan for sale. Liam dreams of starting afresh by purchasing a caravan to live in with his mother and sister, away from Stan and Rab. To afford it, he and Pinball steal a delivery of drugs from Stan's house and sell them. They soon raise several thousand pounds, which they pay as a deposit towards the caravan in Liam's mother's name.

Liam's efforts attract the attention of the local drug "godfather", Tony Douglas. Liam agrees to work with them after Tony tells him to "stay away from our shops". Pinball, meanwhile, is thrown into the health club showers due to his disrespectful behaviour towards the dealer, and vows revenge. Liam and Pinball continue selling drugs locally, with the help of Liam's other friends who deliver pizzas. Liam and Pinball meet again with members of Tony's gang, and Liam joins them in their car. Pinball is kicked out, angering him further; the gang members advise Liam to "dump" Pinball for good. They take Liam to a Glasgow nightclub and inform him that he has to kill someone to join the gang. Liam attempts to do so, but is stopped by the gang, who inform him it was a test—which he has passed.

Liam, Chantelle, Calum and Suzanne (Chantelle's friend) drive to the caravan for a picnic, only to discover that it has been burned down. Liam believes Stan did it. That evening, Pinball turns up in Tony's stolen car, telling Liam that he wants revenge. He proceeds to crash the car into the health club. Liam speaks to Tony in the morning and is ordered to kill Pinball. The next morning, Pinball—aware of Liam's intentions—tries to stab Liam, before proudly revealing that he burnt down the caravan. He then cuts his own face in rage. Liam reassures his injured friend after phoning for an ambulance, but he then notifies Tony that the deed has "been done", implying that he has indeed murdered Pinball.

Tony promises to buy Liam an upscale apartment, and on the day before his birthday, Liam's mother is released from prison and taken to this new house on the coast of Gourock where she is welcomed with a party. She appears uneasy, and the next morning is found to have escaped to Stan's house. Liam blames this on Chantelle, who is now fully aware that Liam is dealing drugs. She attempts to warn him about their mother probably not being so thankful for Liam's efforts because she is too devoted to Stan, but this only provokes Liam further. An enraged Liam goes to Stan's house, trying to convince his mother to return to their new home, only to be insulted by Stan. In a struggle, Liam stabs Stan.

Liam walks alone on the beach. He is phoned by Chantelle, who reminds him that it is his 16th birthday on that day, meaning he can be tried in court as an adult. She also tells him that the police have been looking for him, and that despite everything that he has done, Chantelle still loves him. He walks towards the sea.

== Cast ==
- Martin Compston as Liam
- Annmarie Fulton as Chantelle
- William Ruane as Pinball
- Junior Walker as Nighttime
- Gary McCormack as Stan
- Jon Morrison as Douglas

== Soundtrack ==
- "The Arrival of the Night Queen from The Magic Flute" by Wolfgang Amadeus Mozart – Performed by Failoni Kamerazenekar and Helen Kwon
- "I'll Stand by You" – Written by Tom Kelly, Billy Steinberg and Chrissie Hynde – Performed by the Pretenders
- "Burn in Hell" – Written by Otten/Skog/Tell/Torstensen – Performed by Clawfinger
- "Dogman" – Written by Tristan Hervo – Performed by Wide Open Cage
- "Bushes" – Written by Markus Nikolai, Theo Krieger, Clair Dietrich – Performed by Markus Nikolai
- "Ain't No Love (Ain't No Use)" – Written by Melanie Williams, Jimi Goodwin, Jez Williams, Andy Williams – Performed by Sub Sub featuring Melanie Williams
- "Let Me Entertain You" – Written by Robbie Williams and Guy Chambers – Performed by Robbie Williams
- "You Stole the Sun from My Heart" – Written by James Dean Bradfield, Nicky Wire, Sean Moore – Performed by Manic Street Preachers
- "I Go to Sleep" – Written and composed by Ray Davies – Performed by the Pretenders

== Reception ==
Sweet Sixteen premiered at the UGC in central Glasgow on 1 October 2002. On the review aggregator website Rotten Tomatoes, the film holds an approval rating of 97% based on 88 reviews, with an average rating of 7.9/10. The website's critics consensus reads, "A bleak, but heartbreaking coming-of-age tale that resonates with truth." Metacritic, which uses a weighted average, assigned the film a score of 86 out of 100, based on 25 critics, indicating "universal acclaim". Sweet Sixteen was nominated for the Palme d'Or and won the Best Screenplay Award at the 2002 Cannes Film Festival. Sweet Sixteen inspired Italian singer-songwriter Lucio Dalla for the 2007 song "Liam".

=== Criticism of BBFC classification ===
Use of the words fuck (313 times) and cunt (about 20 times) led the British Board of Film Classification (BBFC) to forbid the film to viewers under the age of 18. Spain followed this decision, but other countries, like France and Germany (not under 12) had a different rating system. Loach and Paul Laverty protested against the British procedure in The Guardian.

Laverty asserted that this was "censorship" and "class prejudice" because he obtained plenty of information to write his screenplay from people around Scotland, many of whom were not 18, and were therefore denied the opportunity to see the film. The BBFC acknowledged that there is some variation across the United Kingdom in how offensive some words are perceived, but stood by the 18 certificate and argued that most of the publicity around the film was "mostly generated by the disgruntled film-maker".

Screenings in Inverclyde, Martin Compston's birthplace, where the film was shot, were shown under a 15 certificate.
