= List of River City characters =

The following is a list of characters in River City, a Scottish soap opera that was broadcast on BBC Scotland from 24 September 2002 to 31 August 2026. When more than one actor has played a character, the most recent actor is listed last.

Character	Actor	Duration
Callum Adams	Robbie Neilson	2010–2016
Callum Adams	Ty McPhee	2017–2026
Kelly-Marie Adams	Carmen Pieraccini	2003–2008, 2010–2016, 2019, 2024–2026
Patrick Adams	Gerard Miller	2014–2017
Sammi Amira	Samia Rida	2009
Paul Ames	James Allenby-Kirk	2020–2021
Armand Ashraf	Ahd Tamimi	2023–2024
Jodie Banks	Kirsty Mitchell	2006
Heather Bellshaw	Jenni Keenan Green	2002–2007
Jules Belmont	Aisha Toussaint	2017–2018
Shelley Belmont	Adiza Shardow	2017–2018
Chris Black	Graeme Dalling	2025–2026
Harry Black	Carter Ferguson	2004–2008
Charlie Bowie	Ryan Smith	2009–2010
Jennifer Bowie	Lorna Craig	2009–2010
Adeeb Brodie	Taryam Boyd	2010–2013
Chloe Brodie	Shonagh Price	2013
Conor Brodie	Rian Gordon	2010–2013, 2024–2026
Gabriel Brodie	Garry Sweeney	2010–2019, 2021–2022
Leyla Brodie	Maryam Hamidi	2010–2014
Leo Brodie	Nick Rhys	2010–2011
Michael Brodie	Andy Clark	2010–2012
Nicole Brodie	Holly Jack	2010–2015, 2018–2024, 2026
Archie Buchanan	Gilly Gilchrist	2003–2008
Douglas Buchanan	Gilly Gilchrist	2008
Stevie Burns	Paul-James Corrigan	2011–2016
Jodie Calvano	Chloe Hodgson	2026
Andrew Campbell-Baxter	Greg Powrie	2022–2024
Duncan Campbell-Baxter	John Bett	2021–2022
Victoria Campbell-Baxter	Emma Currie	2023–2024
Colin Campbell	Sean Kane	2006–2012
Hazel Campbell	Annmarie Fulton	2002–2005
Logan Caplan	Kevin Mains	2018–2019
Lou Caplan	Lesley Hart	2018–2023
Sonny Caplan	Jimmy Chisholm	2018–2025
Andy Carroll	Jamie Michie	2010
Tommy Chalmers	David McGowan	2022–2026
Cameron Christie	Michael Wallace	2020–2021
Dylan Christie	Sean Connor	2019–2021
Eve Christie	Victoria Liddelle	2019–2021, 2023
Karen Connolly	Claire Dargo	2021–2026
Will Cooper	Scott Vickers	2012–2015
Lewis Cope	Duncan Duff	2002–2005
Eddie Corrigan	Rob Jarvis	2024–2026
Andy Cousins	Simon Webbe	2016–2017
Charlotte Crozier	Daisy Veldhoven	2017–2019
Fraser Crozier	Neil McNulty	2008–2011
Murray Crozier	Brian Cowan	2010–2014
Nicki Cullen	Jayd Johnson	2003–2009
Patricia Cullen	Caroline Paterson	2004
Zoe Cullen	Laura McMonagle	2005–2008
Billy Davis	Gray O'Brien	2003–2007
Della Davis	Katie McEwen	2003–2007
Angel Delaney	Hanna Stanbridge	2015–2016
Sandra Devlin	Caroline Paterson	2014–2015
Eileen Donachie	Deirdre Davis	2002–2016
Ewan Donachie	Alasdair Harvey	2002–2003
Tommy Donachie	Eric Barlow	2002–2003
DCI Craig Donald	Robin Laing	2012–2017, 2022
DCI James Douglas	Paul McCole	2024–2026
Brian 'Buster' Doyle	Graeme Stevely	2014, 2026
Charlie Drummond	June Brogan	2006–2008
Jean Drummond	Kate Donnelly	2006–2008
Michael 'Mikey' Duffy	Darren Brownlie	2022–2026
Lochlan Dunbar	Paul Luebke	2018
Jac Dunn	Charlene Boyd	2020–2021
Joe Dunn	Douglas Rankine	2019–2020
Joy Easdale	Elysia Welch	2024
Rebecca Fleming	Jamie Marie Leary	2020–2023
Darren Foulkes	Sammy Hayman	2021–2022
Harry Foulkes	Jim Sturgeon	2024–2026
Tyler Foulkes	Cameron Fulton	2020–2026
Vivienne Foulkes	Simone Lahbib	2025–2026
Ben Franklin	John P. Arnold	2008
Carly Fraser	Michelle O'Brien	2005–2008
Lily Fraser	Ida Schuster	2002
Lola Fraser	Suzanne Bonnar	2005
Robbie Fraser	Gary Lamont	2009–2017
Suzie Fraser	Bridget McCann	2012–2013
Suzie Fraser	Juliet Cadzow	2016–2024
Pete Galloway	Andy Gray	2016–2018
Dominic Gibson	Richard Conlon	2022
Emma Gibson	Rachel Dick	2025–2026
Gillian Gibson	Gail Watson	2022–2026
Helen Gilmore	Gerda Stevenson	2002–2003
DCI Rachel Grant	Therese Bradley	2011–2013, 2015–2022
Marty Green	Daniel Schutzmann	2005–2008
Erin Gunn	Emma Hartley-Miller	2015
Gina Hamilton	Libby McArthur	2002–2013, 2016, 2022
Liz Hamilton	Eileen McCallum	2006–2018
Malcolm Hamilton	Johnny Beattie	2002–2016
Dean Hardy	Michael McCardie	2023–2026
Rick Harper	Alex Ferns	2017–2018
Zinnie Hassoun	Nalini Chetty	2010–2015
Alice Henderson	Lorraine McIntosh	2002–2007
Brian Henderson	William Ruane	2002–2004, 2009, 2016
Deek Henderson	Gordon McCorkell	2002–2012
George Henderson	John Murtagh	2002–2007
Moira Henderson	Jo Cameron Brown	2002–2004
Raymond Henderson	Paul Samson	2002–2014, 2023
Robert Henderson	Maurice Roëves	2002–2014
Shirley Henderson	Barbara Rafferty	2004–2009, 2012
Shona Henderson	Julie Duncanson	2006–2009
Kirsty Henderson	Kari Corbett	2002–2003
Lee Hope	James Palmer	2009–2010
Dan Hunter	Adam Robertson	2011–2015
DCI Eddie Hunter	Derek Munn	2003–2007
Jamie Hunter	Anthony Martin	2006–2008
Paul Hunter	Sean Brown	2006–2008
Tina Hunter	Jenny Ryan	2006–2008
Amandeep 'AJ' Jandhu	Sanjeev Kohli	2015–2022, 2025
Harry Jandhu	Manpreet Bachu	2015–2016
Harry Jandhu	Ryaan Ali	2022
Alice Linder	Jasmine Main	2025–2026
Leanne Johnstone	Christina Mackinnon	2010
Terri Johnstone	Julie Coombe	2010
Sean Kennedy	James Cunningham	2012
Billy Kennedy	Alexander Morton	2012–2013, 2015, 2022
Billy Kennedy	Jon Morrison	2015–2016
Mandy Kennedy	Julie Austin	2012–2014
Martina Kennedy	Ann-Louise Ross	2015–2016, 2022
Barry Khatri	Parmy Singh	2021–2023
Farah Khurana	Shobna Gulati	2017–2018
Ash King	Brian James Leys	2021–2024
Lena Krausky	Anna Kerth	2006–2007
Fi Kydd	Monica Gibb	2006–2008
Mai Lau	Jaclyn Tse	2006–2007
Michael Learmonth	Seamus Gubbins	2009–2012
Alan Lindsay	Stephen McCole	2014–2015
Angus Lindsay	Scott Fletcher	2014–2026
Cassie Lindsay	Sophia Kolinas	2016–2017
Kirsty Lindsay	Bobby Rainsbury	2014
Rhona Lindsay	Jo Freer	2014
Simon Mack	James Young	2025–2026
Innes Maitland	Sam Robertson	2009
Graeme 'Mac' Macdonald	Gordon Kennedy	2005
Finlay Mackay	Sonny Green	2014
Isobel MacKenzie	Alison Peebles	2018–2019
Hana Malik	Mamta Kaash	2002–2003
Jamilah Malik	Laxmi Kathuria	2002–2003
Karim Malik	Kriss Dosanjh	2002–2003
Nazir Malik	Riz Abbasi	2002–2003
Zara Malik	Shabana Akhtar Bakhsh	2002–2003
Glenn McAllister	John Macauley	2005
Jamie McAllister	Mark Rowley	2013–2014
Jessie McAllister	Kirsty Pickering	2020–2023
Agnes McCabe	Kay Gallie	2005
Donna McCabe	Paula Sage	2005
Frances McCabe	Andrea Hart	2012
Thomas McCabe	Tam Dean Burn	2002–2006, 2008, 2011
Hayley McCrone	Pamela Byrne	2009–2012
Gerry McGrade	John Paul McGilvray	2005–2007
Daniel McKee	Ewan Stewart	2008–2009
Marianne McKee	Frances Grey	2008
Caitlin McLean	Gayle Telfer-Stevens	2015–2026
Drew McLean	Benjamin Nugent	2015–2017
Drew McLean	Martin Bell	2024–2026
Ellie McLean	Leah MacRae	2014–2022
Jenny McLean	Christine Steel	2015–2016
John McLean	Frank Gilhooly	2017–2018, 2021
Maggie McLean	Kathryn Howden	2017–2026
Ruby McLean	Toniann Christie	2015–2018
Ruby McLean	Zindzi Hudson	2018–2022
Carly McLeish	Abbie Purvis	2024–2025
Iona McIntyre	Claire Knight	2006–2012
Roisin McIntyre	Joyce Falconer	2002–2008, 2021–2026
Sandy McKinnon	Robert Cavanah	2012
Steph McKenzie	Emma Campbell Webster	2004
Dr Marcus McKenzie	Stefan Dennis	2002–2003
Frank McKenna	Jon Morrison	2004
Greg McManus	George Anton	2013
Liam McNulty	Patrick Mulvey	2006
Alanna McVey	Jade Lezar	2004–2007
Russ Minto	Grant Ibbs	2002–2003
Nick Morrison	Colin McCredie	2010–2011
Jimmy Mullen	Billy McElhaney	2005–2016
Madonna Mullen	Sienna Glackin	2006–2020
Madonna Mullen	Lauren Grace	2022–2025
Michael 'Mick' Mulvaney	Laurie Ventry	2010, 2015, 2018, 2021–2026
Jake Munro	Russell Barr	2007−2008
Sonny Munro	Angus MacInnes	2007–2008
Alex Murdoch	Jordan Young	2013–2026
Amber Murdoch	Lorna Anderson	2007–2011
Amber Murdoch	Jenny Hulse	2016–2026
Annie Murdoch	Dawn Steele	2015−2018
Ewan Murdoch	Chris Brazier	2008–2010, 2022
Lenny Murdoch	Frank Gallagher	2005–2026
Lydia Murdoch	Jacqueline Leonard	2007–2012, 2017–2019, 2022–2026
Mary Murdoch	Judith Sweeney	2008
Rory Murdoch	David Paisley	2007–2009, 2019–2021
Andrew Murray	Sam Heughan	2005–2007
Gareth O'Connor	Paul Brannigan	2012–2013
Bernadette 'Bernie' O'Hara	Barbara Rafferty	2018–2024
Robert 'Big Bob' O'Hara	Tom Urie	2009–2015, 2018
Bob O'Hara	Stephen Purdon	2002–2026
Christina O'Hara	Caitlin Gillespie	2011–2015
Kim O'Hara	Frances Thorburn	2016–2024
Mackenzie O'Hara	Connor McPhelim	2017–2026
Molly O'Hara	Una McLean	2009–2019
Scarlett O'Hara	Sally Howitt	2003–2026
Stevie O'Hara	Cas Harkins	2003–2005
Stevie O'Hara	Iain Robertson	2017–2023
Tatiana O'Hara	Magdalena Kaleta	2011–2015
Theresa O'Hara	Maureen Carr	2010, 2018
Cormac O'Sullivan	Jason Pitt	2002–2005
Frank Paton	Paul Thomas Hickey	2014
Dougie Patterson	Stewart Porter	2017–2019
Jack Patterson	John Comerford	2009–2010
Poppy Patterson	Lindsey Campbell	2018–2022
Poppy Patterson	Kari Corbett	2023
Chloe Qi-Lewis	Frances Mayli McCann	2023–2025
Alasdair Quinn	Michael Mackenzie	2017
Michelle Rafferty	Laura O'Donnell	2005–2007
Alice Reynolds	Sophie Mercer	2012–2013
Viv Roberts	Louise Jameson	2008
Duncan Robertson	Kieron Elliott	2006
Freya Robertson	Natasha Watson	2006
Eilidh Rossi	Lily Walker	2008–2011
Franco Rossi, Jr.	Adam Khan	2008
Luca Rossi	Juan Pablo Di Pace	2005–2006
Joanne Rossi	Allison McKenzie	2002–2007
Joanne Rossi	Lisa Gardner	2008–2010
Ruth Rossi	Morag Calder	2002–2011, 2016
Frankie Roth	Louise McMenemy	2016–2018
Greig Roth	Glen Wallace	2016–2018
Katie Roth	Libby Dye	2016–2020
Lorna Roth	Alana Hood	2016–2017
Michael Royston	David Murray	2006
Dilip Shah	Aron Sidhu	2005
Alisha Shah	Meneka Das	2005
Arun Shah	Ricky Dhillon	2005
Brooke Shaw	Lisa Livingstone	2022–2025
Annie Sobacz	Reanne Farley	2010–2012
Sam Spiller	Grant Stott	2021–2026
Seb Spiller	George Drennan	2024–2025
Callum Stuart	Donald Pirie	2002–2005
Miriam Stubbs	Kate Rutter	2012–2013
Gordon Swan	Sandy Welch	2009–2010
Gary Trenton	James Mackenzie	2015–2017
Danny Turner	Neil Pendleton	2017–2018
Scott Wallace	Tony Kearney	2003–2011
JP Walsh	Gary McCormack	2003
Mark Walker	Finlay MacMillan	2013
Stella Walker	Keira Lucchesi	2009–2016, 2022
Angie Warren	Kirsty Strain	2012
Richard Whiteside	Michael Nardone	2007–2008
Jonathon Whitlock	Edward Corrie	2023–2026
Johnny Wu	Richard Ng	2002
Susie Wu	Teo-Wa Vuong	2006–2007

== Lists of characters by year of introduction ==
- List of River City characters introduced in 2002–2003
- List of River City characters introduced in 2004–2005
- List of River City characters introduced in 2006–2007
- List of River City characters introduced in 2008–2009
- List of River City characters introduced in 2010–2011
- List of River City characters introduced in 2012–2013
- List of River City characters introduced in 2014–2015
- List of River City characters introduced in 2016–2017
- List of River City characters introduced in 2018–2019
- List of River City characters introduced in 2020–2021
- List of River City characters introduced in 2022–2023
- List of River City characters introduced in 2024–2026
