= List of River City characters introduced in 2024–2026 =

River City was a BBC Scotland soap opera from Scotland. This is a list of characters who first appeared on the programme during 2024, 2025 and 2026.In March 2025, it was announced that River City would cease production after 2026. Any new characters introduced in 2026 will be listed here.

== James Douglas ==
James Douglas
- River City character
- Portrayed by: Paul McCole
- Duration: 2024–present
- First appearance: 17 June 2024
In-universe information
- Occupation: Police officer

DCI James Douglas is a fictional character from the BBC Scotland soap opera River City portrayed by Paul McCole. He is a police officer.

== Eddie Corrigan ==
Eddie Corrigan
- River City character
- Portrayed by: Rob Jarvis
- Duration: 2024–present
- First appearance: 1 April 2024

Eddie Corrigan is a fictional character from the BBC Scotland soap opera River City portrayed by Rob Jarvis.

== Harry Foulkes ==
Harry Foulkes
- River City character
- Portrayed by: Jim Sturgeon
- Duration: 2024–present
- First appearance: 21 October 2024
In-universe information
- Wife: Vivienne Barton (backstory)
- Sons: Tyler Foulkes; Darren Foulkes

Harry Foulkes is a fictional character from the BBC Scotland soap opera River City portrayed by Jim Sturgeon. Harry is the nemesis of gangster Lenny Murdoch (Frank Gallagher). Harry is the father of Tyler Foulkes (Cameron Fulton).

== Carly McLeish ==
Carly McLeish
- River City character
- Portrayed by: Abbie Purvis
- Duration: 2024–present
In-universe information
- Father: Tommy Chalmers

Carly McLeish is a fictional character from the BBC Scotland soap opera River City portrayed by Abbie Purvis. She has dwarfism.

She is the daughter of Tommy Chalmers.

== Simon Mack ==
Simon Mack
- River City character
- Portrayed by: James Young
- Duration: 2025–present
- First appearance: 2025

Simon Mack is a fictional character from the BBC Scotland soap opera River City portrayed by James Young.

== Emma Gibson ==
Emma Gibson
- River City character
- Portrayed by: Rachel Dick
- Duration: 2025–present
- First appearance: 9 April 2025

Emma Gibson is a fictional character from the BBC Scotland soap opera River City portrayed by Rachel Dick.

== Vivienne Barton ==
Vivienne Barton
- River City character
- Portrayed by: Simone Lahbib
- Duration: 2025–present
- First appearance: 23 July 2025
In-universe information
- Occupation: Business owner
- Husband: Harry Foulkes (backstory)
- Sons: Tyler Foulkes

Vivienne (Viv) Barton is a fictional character from the BBC Scotland soap opera River City portrayed by Simone Lahbib. Viv is a business owner who arrives in Shieldinch in the hope of reconciling with her son Tyler Foulkes (Cameron Fulton) after walking out on her marriage to Harry Foulkes (Jim Sturgeon) and her family over two decades ago.

== Chris Black ==
Chris Black
- River City character
- Portrayed by: Graeme Dalling
- Duration: 2025–2026

Chris Black is a fictional character from the BBC Scotland soap opera River City portrayed by Graeme Dalling.

== Alice Linder ==
Alice Linder
- River City character
- Portrayed by: Jasmine Main
- Duration: 2025–2026

Alice Linder is a fictional character from the BBC Scotland soap opera River City portrayed by Jasmine Main.

== Jodie Calvano ==
Jodie Calvano
- River City character
- Portrayed by: Chloe Hodgson
- Duration: 2026

Jodie Calvano is a fictional character from the BBC Scotland soap opera River City portrayed by Chloe Hodgson.
