= List of River City characters introduced in 2022–2023 =

River City was a BBC Scotland soap opera from Scotland. This is a list of characters who first appeared on the programme during 2022 and 2023.

== Andrew Campbell-Baxter ==
Andrew Campbell-Baxter
- River City character
- Portrayed by: Emma Currie
- Duration: 2022–2024
- First appearance: 31 January 2022
- Last appearance: 3 January 2024
In-universe information
- Occupation: Lawyer
- Father: Duncan Campbell-Baxter
- Sisters: Victoria Campbell-Baxter

Andrew Campbell-Baxter is a fictional character from the BBC Scotland soap opera River City portrayed by Emma Currie.

He was killed off after sexually assaulting Lydia Murdoch (Jacqueline Leonard). The scenes were part of a storyline where a destructive storm hit Shieldinch in January 2023.

== Gillian Gibson ==
Gillian Gibson
- River City character
- Portrayed by: Gail Watson
- Duration: 2022–present
- First appearance: 17 January 2022
In-universe information
- Occupation: Doctor
- Husband: Dominic Gibson

Gillian Gibson is a fictional character from the BBC Scotland soap opera River City portrayed by Gail Watson.

She is the new doctor and arrives with her assistant Mikey Duffy (Darren Brownlie).

== Dominic Gibson ==
Dominic Gibson
- River City character
- Portrayed by: Richard Conlon
- Duration: 2022
- First appearance: 12 September 2022
- Last appearance: 28 December 2022
In-universe information
- Wife: Gillian Gibson

Dominic Gibson is a fictional character from the BBC Scotland soap opera River City portrayed by Richard Conlon.

== Mikey Duffy ==
Mikey Duffy
- River City character
- Portrayed by: Darren Brownlie
- Duration: 2022–present
- First appearance: 17 January 2022
In-universe information
- Occupation: Doctor

Michael 'Mikey' Duffy is a fictional character from the BBC Scotland soap opera River City portrayed by Darren Brownlie.

He is the assistant to new doctor Gillian Gibson (Gail Watson).

== Tommy Chalmers ==
Tommy Chalmers
- River City character
- Portrayed by: David McGowan
- Duration: 2022–Present
- First appearance: 1 June 2022
In-universe information
- Daughters: Carly McLeish

Tommy Chalmers is a fictional character from the BBC Scotland soap opera River City portrayed by David McGowan.

He has a relationship with Roisin McIntyre (Joyce Falconer). The two actors are married in real life.

== Brooke Shaw ==
Brooke Shaw
- River City character
- Portrayed by: Lisa Livingstone
- Duration: 2022–2025
- First appearance: 15 August 2022

DCI Brooke Shaw is a fictional character from the BBC Scotland soap opera River City portrayed by Lisa Livingstone. She is a police officer.

She returned from the dead in 2025.

== Dean Hardy ==
Dean Hardy
- River City character
- Portrayed by: Michael McCardie
- Duration: 2023–Present
- First appearance: 24 May 2023
In-universe information
- Half-brothers: Angus Lindsay

Dean Hardy is a fictional character from the BBC Scotland soap opera River City portrayed by Michael McCardie. His mother Maureen Carr played Theresa O'Hara.

Dean is the half-brother of Angus Lindsay (Scott Fletcher).

== Seb Spiller ==
Seb Spiller
- River City character
- Portrayed by: George Drennan
- Duration: 2023–2025
In-universe information
- Brothers: Sam Spiller

Seb Spiller is a fictional character from the BBC Scotland soap opera River City portrayed by George Drennan.

Seb is the brother of Sam Spiller (Grant Stott).

== Chloe Qi-Lewis ==
Chloe Qi-Lewis
- River City character
- Portrayed by: Frances Mayli McCann
- Duration: 2023–2025
In-universe information
- Stepfather: Sam Spiller

Chloe Qi-Lewis is a fictional character from the BBC Scotland soap opera River City portrayed by Frances Mayli McCann.

She is the stepdaughter of Sam Spiller (Grant Stott).

== Victoria Campbell-Baxter ==
Victoria Campbell-Baxter
- River City character
- Portrayed by: Emma Currie
- Duration: 2023–2024
In-universe information
- Occupation: Lawyer
- Father: Duncan Campbell-Baxter
- Brothers: Andrew Campbell-Baxter

Victoria Campbell-Baxter is a fictional character from the BBC Scotland soap opera River City portrayed by Emma Currie.

She is a lawyer and is the sister of Andrew Campbell-Baxter (Greg Powrie).

== Jonathon Whitlock ==
Jonathon Whitlock
- River City character
- Portrayed by: Edward Corrie
- Duration: 2023–2025
- First appearance: 30 October 2023
- Last appearance: 27 August 2025

Jonathon Whitlock is a fictional character from the BBC Scotland soap opera River City portrayed by Edward Corrie.

He is the boyfriend of Mikey Duffy (Darren Brownlie).

== Armand Ashraf ==
Armand Ashraf
- River City character
- Portrayed by: Ahd Tamimi
- Duration: 2023–2024
In-universe information
- Occupation: Barber

Armand Ashraf is a fictional character from the BBC Scotland soap opera River City portrayed by Ahd Tamimi. He is a barber and friends with Ash King (Brian James Leys).
