= List of River City characters introduced in 2016–2017 =

River City is a BBC Scotland soap opera from Scotland. This is a list of characters who first appeared on the programme during 2016 and 2017.

== Cassie Lindsay ==
Cassie Lindsay
- River City character
- Portrayed by: Sophia Kolinas
- Duration: 2016–2017
In-universe information
- Husband: Angus Lindsay (ex-husband)

Cassie Lindsay (nee Evans) is a fictional character from the BBC Scotland soap opera River City portrayed by Canadian actress Sophia Kolinas. She is introduced as a love interest for Angus Lindsay (Scott Fletcher). The couple marry but the marriage breaks down.

== Maggie McLean ==
Maggie McLean
- River City character
- Portrayed by: Kathryn Howden
- Duration: 2017–present
In-universe information
- Brothers: John McLean
- Daughters: Ellie McLean

Maggie McLean is a fictional character from the BBC Scotland soap opera River City portrayed by Kathryn Howden.

Maggie has an abusive brother John. She killed Joe Dunn. In 2018, Maggie reveals she is a victim of rape and incest.

== Kim O'Hara ==
Kim O'Hara
- River City character
- Portrayed by: Frances Thorburn
- Duration: 2016–2024
In-universe information
- Mother: Isobel MacKenzie
- Spouse: Simon Monroe (previously); Bob O'Hara
- Sons: Mackenzie O'Hara

Kim O'Hara (also Monroe) is a fictional character from the BBC Scotland soap opera River City portrayed by Frances Thorburn. Her storylines, from a broken down marriage with Bob O'Hara and health complications that saw her undergo a heart transplant.

In 2024, she appears to survive a car crash that takes the life of Bernie O'Hara, but succumbs to her injuries while waiting for Bob to return with ice cream after chatting on a bench in Montego Street .

== Ellie McLean ==
Ellie McLean
- River City character
- Portrayed by: Leah MacRae
- Duration: 2016–2022
In-universe information
- Mother: Maggie McLean

Ellie McLean is a fictional character from the BBC Scotland soap opera River City portrayed by Leah MacRae.

Ellie joins as a care worker who looks after dementia sufferer Malcolm Hamilton (Johnny Beattie).

In early 2022, Ellie had a storyline on infertility. She then turns to surrogacy.

== Pete Galloway ==
Pete Galloway
- River City character
- Portrayed by: Andy Gray
- Duration: 2016–2018
In-universe information
- Wife: Caitlin McLean
- Sons: Drew McLean

Pete Galloway (also Griffiths and McLean) is a fictional character from the BBC Scotland soap opera River City played by Andy Gray. Andy is the husband of Caitlin McLean and the father of Drew McLean. Gray died in 2021. The character died off-screen in January 2022.

== Martina Kennedy ==
Martina Kennedy
- River City character
- Portrayed by: Ann-Louise Ross
- Duration: 2016–2022
In-universe information
- Brothers: Billy Kennedy
- Sons: Alex McAllister

Martina Kennedy (also McAllister) is a fictional character from the BBC Scotland soap opera River City played by Ann-Louise Ross. She described as an evil matriarch. She is the mother of Alex McAllister (Jordan Young).

== Greig Roth ==
Greig Roth
- River City character
- Portrayed by: Glen Wallace
- Duration: 2016–2018
In-universe information
- Wife: Lorna Roth
- Daughters: Frankie Roth; Katie Roth

Greig Roth is a fictional character from the BBC Scotland soap opera River City played by Glen Wallace. He was introduced in 2016 alongside his wife Lorna (Alana Hood) and daughters Frankie (Lorna McMenemy) and Katie (Libby Dye).

== Lorna Roth ==
Lorna Roth
- River City character
- Portrayed by: Alana Hood
- Duration: 2016–2017
- Appears in: 11 October 2016
In-universe information
- Sisters: Annie Murdoch
- Husband: Greig Roth
- Daughters: Frankie Roth; Katie Roth

Lorna Roth is a fictional character from the BBC Scotland soap opera River City played by Alana Hood. She was introduced in 2016 alongside her husband Greig (Glen Wallace) and daughters Frankie (Lorna McMenemy) and Katie (Libby Dye). She is the younger sister of local GP Annie Murdoch (Dawn Steele).

== Frankie Roth ==
Frankie Roth
- River City character
- Portrayed by: Lorna McMenemy
- Duration: 2016–2018
In-universe information
- Father: Greig Roth
- Mother: Lorna Roth
- Sisters: Katie Roth

Frankie Roth is a fictional character from the BBC Scotland soap opera River City played by Lorna McMenemy. She was introduced in 2016 alongside her parents Greig (Glen Wallace) and Lorna (Alana Hood) and sister Katie (Libby Dye).

She dated Angus Lindsay and dealt with bulimia. She killed villain Rick Harper (Alex Ferns).

== Katie Roth ==
Katie Roth
- River City character
- Portrayed by: Libby Dye
- Duration: 2016–2018
In-universe information
- Father: Greig Roth
- Mother: Lorna Roth
- Sisters: Frankie Roth

Katie Roth is a fictional character from the BBC Scotland soap opera River City played by Libby Dye. She was introduced in 2016 alongside her parents Greig (Glen Wallace) and Lorna (Alana Hood) and sister Frankie (Lorna McMenemy).

== Andy Cousins ==
Andy Cousins
- River City character
- Portrayed by: Simon Webbe
- Duration: 2016–2017
In-universe information
- Occupation: Soldier

Andy Cousins is a fictional character from the BBC Scotland soap opera River City played by Blue singer Simon Webbe in his television debut. Andy first appeared in November 2016. Webbe did not use a Scottish accent for the role. Andy is a former army soldier and a close friend of the Roth family.

== Mackenzie O'Hara ==
Mackenzie O'Hara
- River City character
- Portrayed by: Connor McPhelim
- Duration: 2017–present

Mackenzie O'Hara is a fictional character from the BBC Scotland soap opera River City played by Connor McPhelim. He is the son of Kim O'Hara (Frances Thorburn).

== Rick Harper ==
Rick Harper
- River City character
- Portrayed by: Alex Ferns
- Duration: 2017–2018

Rick Harper is a fictional character from the BBC Scotland soap opera River City played by Alex Ferns.

The villain was killed off in a whodunit storyline when he was hit on the head with a candle stick, later revealed to be Frankie Roth (Lorna McMenemy).

== Dougie Patterson ==
Dougie Patterson
- River City character
- Portrayed by: Stewart Porter
- Duration: 2017–2019
In-universe information
- Daughters: Poppy Patterson

Dougie Patterson is a fictional character from the BBC Scotland soap opera River City played by Stewart Porter.

== Charlotte Crozier ==
Charlotte Crozier
- River City character
- Portrayed by: Daisy Veldhoven
- Duration: 2017–2020
In-universe information
- Grandfathers: Lenny Murdoch

Charlotte Crozier (also Murdoch) is a fictional character from the BBC Scotland soap opera River City played by Daisy Veldhoven.

== Jules Belmont ==
Jules Belmont
- River City character
- Portrayed by: Aisha Toussaint
- Duration: 2017–2018
- First appearance: 31 January 2017
In-universe information
- Sisters: Shelley Belmont

Jules Belmont is a fictional character from the BBC Scotland soap opera River City played by Aisha Toussaint.

== Shelley Belmont ==
Shelley Belmont
- River City character
- Portrayed by: Adiza Shardow
- Duration: 2017–2018
In-universe information
- Sisters: Jules Belmont

Shelley Belmont is a fictional character from the BBC Scotland soap opera River City played by Adiza Shardow.

== Farah Khurana ==
Farah Khurana
- River City character
- Portrayed by: Shobna Gulati
- Duration: 2017–2018

Farah Khurana is a fictional character from the BBC Scotland soap opera River City played by Shobna Gulati. Gulati is famous from playing Sunita Alahan in Coronation Street. Farah is a university friend of artisan baker AJ Jandhu. The character is described as "fun loving".

== John McLean ==
John McLean
- River City character
- Portrayed by: Frank Gilhooley
- Duration: 2017–2021
In-universe information
- Sisters: Maggie McLean

John McLean is a fictional character from the BBC Scotland soap opera River City played by Frank Gilhooley.

John is involved in an incest and sex abuse storyline.

== Danny Turner ==
Danny Turner
- River City character
- Portrayed by: Neil Pendleton
- Duration: 2017–2018
In-universe information
- Father: Pete Galloway

Danny Turner is a fictional character from the BBC Scotland soap opera River City played by Neil Pendleton from 2017 to 2018.
