= Zinnie =

Zinnie may refer to:

- Zinnie Harris, British playwright, screenwriter and director
- Zinnie Hassoun, fictional character from the soap opera River City

== See also ==
- Zinnie tan
