= List of River City characters introduced in 2010–2011 =

River City is a BBC Scotland soap opera from Scotland. This is a list of characters who first appeared on the programme during 2010 and 2011.

== Annie Sobacz ==
Annie Sobacz
- River City character
- Portrayed by: Reanne Farley
- Duration: 2010–2012
In-universe information
- Occupation: Barmaid
- Family: McIntyre

Annie Sobacz is a fictional character from the BBC Scotland soap opera River City portrayed by Reanne Farley. She is a distant cousin of the McIntyre family.

== Nick Morrison ==
Nick Morrison is a fictional character from the BBC Scotland soap opera River City portrayed by Colin McCredie.

== Zinnie Hassoun ==
Zinnie Hassoun is a fictional character from the BBC Scotland soap opera River City portrayed by Nalini Chetty.

Zinnie is the fiancé of Angus Lindsay (Scott Fletcher). She was raped by Jamie McAllister (Mark Rowley).

She was killed off in 2015 as a result of a car bomb intended for Lenny Murdoch (Frank Gallagher).

== Leanne Johnstone ==
Leanne Johnstone is a fictional character from the BBC Scotland soap opera River City portrayed by Christina Mackinnon.

She is the daughter of Terri Johnstone (Julie Coombe).

== Terri Johnstone ==
Terri Johnstone is a fictional character from the BBC Scotland soap opera River City portrayed by Julie Coombe.

She is the mother of Leanne Johnstone (Christina Mackinnon). She was a girlfriend of Jimmy Mullen.

== Callum Adams ==
Callum Adams
- River City character
- Portrayed by: Robbie Neilson (2010–2016); Ty McPhee (2017–2026)
- Duration: 2010–2016, 2017–2026
In-universe information
- Mother: Kelly-Marie Adams

Callum Adams is a fictional character from the BBC Scotland soap opera River City. Ty McPhee took on the role in 2017. In 2019 Callum is sent to a young juvenile detention centre.

== Andy Carroll ==
Andy Carroll
- River City character
- Portrayed by: Jamie Michie
- Duration: 2010
- First appearance: 21 December 2010
- Last appearance: 28 December 2010
In-universe information
- Wife: Ruth Rossi
- Stepdaughters: Eilidh Green

Andy Carroll is a fictional character from the BBC Scotland soap opera River City portrayed by Jamie Michie.

Andy married his childhood sweetheart Ruth Rossi (Morag Calder).

== Tatiana O'Hara ==
Tatiana O'Hara
- River City character
- Portrayed by: Magdalena Kaleta
- Duration: 2011–2015
In-universe information
- Husband: Big Bob O'Hara
- Daughters: Christina O'Hara

Tatiana 'Tattie' O'Hara is a fictional character from the BBC Scotland soap opera River City portrayed by Polish actress Magdalena Kaleta. She is a nurse.

She was involved in a stillbirth storyline.

== Theresa O'Hara ==
Theresa O'Hara
- River City character
- Portrayed by: Maureen Carr
- Duration: 2010–2018
In-universe information
- Mother: Molly O'Hara
- Sisters: Scarlett O'Hara; Bernie O'Hara
- Nephews: Bob O'Hara

Theresa O'Hara is a fictional character from the BBC Scotland soap opera River City portrayed by Maureen Carr. She was known as a "granny drug dealer".

In 2010, she was released from prison. Theresa caused the death of Liz Buchanan (Eileen McCallum). She was killed off in 2018.

== Christina O'Hara ==
Christina O'Hara
- River City character
- Portrayed by: Caitlin Gillespie
- Duration: 2011–2013
In-universe information
- Mother: Tatiana O'Hara
- Stepfather: Bob O'Hara

Christina O'Hara (also Michalka) is a fictional character from the BBC Scotland soap opera River City portrayed by Caitlin Gillespie. She left the show in 2013 to play Lisa Brown in Waterloo Road.

== Stevie Burns ==
Stevie Burns
- River City character
- Portrayed by: Paul-James Corrigan
- Duration: 2011–2016

Stevie Burns is a fictional character from the BBC Scotland soap opera River City portrayed by Paul-James Corrigan. Described as a loveable rogue, Stevie left the show in 2016.

== Will Cooper ==
Will Cooper
- River City character
- Portrayed by: Scott Vickers
- Duration: 2011–2015
In-universe information
- Occupation: Police officer
- Husband: Robbie Fraser

DC Will Cooper is a fictional character from the lBBC Scotland soap opera River City, played by Scott Vickers.

Will Cooper and Robbie Fraser (Gary Lamont) had the shows first civil partnership. However the relationship suffered from domestic violence.

Will left in 2015.

== Craig Donald ==
Craig Donald
- River City character
- Portrayed by: Robin Laing
- Duration: 2011–2023
In-universe information
- Occupation: Police officer

DCI Craig Donald is a fictional character from the BBC Scotland soap opera River City, played by Robin Laing.

== Rachel Grant ==
Rachel Grant
- River City character
- Portrayed by: Therese Bradley
- Duration: 2011–2023
In-universe information
- Occupation: Police officer

DCI Rachel Grant is a fictional character from the BBC Scotland soap opera River City, played by Therese Bradley. She is a nemesis of Lenny Murdoch (Frank Gallagher).
