= Jean Drummond =

Jean Drummond may refer to:

- Jean Drummond (River City), a character from the BBC soap River City
- Jean Drummond, 16th Baroness Strange (1928–2005), British writer and peer
