= List of River City characters introduced in 2006–2007 =

River City is a BBC Scotland soap opera from Scotland. This is a list of characters who first appeared on the programme during 2006 and 2007, listed in order of their first appearance.

== Rory Murdoch ==
Rory Murdoch
- River City character
- Portrayed by: David Paisley
- Duration: 2006–2009, 2019–2021
In-universe information
- Occupation: Police officer
- Father: Lenny Murdoch
- Mother: Mary Murdoch
- Stepmother: Lydia Murdoch
- Brothers: Ewan Murdoch
- Half-brothers: Alex Murdoch
- Half-sisters: Amber Murdoch

Rory Murdoch is a fictional character from the BBC Scotland soap opera River City, played by David Paisley. Rory left in 2021.

== Eddie Hunter ==
Eddie Hunter
- River City character
- Portrayed by: Derek Munn
- Duration: 2006–2007
In-universe information
- Occupation: Police officer
- Wife: Tina Hunter
- Sons: Jamie Hunter; Paul Hunter

DCI Eddie Hunter is a fictional character from the BBC Scotland soap opera River City, played by Derek Munn. Eddie is a police officer. He is gay.

In March 2007, he was murdered after answering his door to a mystery gunman. It was later discovered to be Lenny Murdoch.

== Jodie Banks ==
Jodie Banks
- River City character
- Portrayed by: Kirsty Mitchell
- Duration: 2006
- First appearance: 24 January 2006
- Last appearance: 7 July 2006
In-universe information
- Occupation: Interior designer Undercover police officer

Jodie Banks is a fictional character from the BBC Scotland soap opera River City, played by Kirsty Mitchell.

Interior designer Jodie was an undercover police officer working to track down the suspected killer of Eddie Hunter (Derek Munn).

== Shirley Henderson ==
Shirley Henderson is a fictional character from the BBC Scotland soap opera River City, played by Barbara Rafferty between 2006 and 2008. In 2018 she re-joined the cast to portray Bernie O'Hara.

== Susie Wu ==
Susie Wu is a fictional character from the BBC Scotland soap opera River City, played by Teo-Wa Vuong between 2006 and 2007.

== Mai Lau ==
Mai Lau is a fictional character from the BBC Scotland soap opera River City, played by Jaclyn Tse between 2006 and 2007. She was a medic.

== Michael Royston ==
Michael Royston is a fictional character from the BBC Scotland soap opera River City, played by David Murray. Father Michael is a priest.

== Michelle Rafferty ==
Michelle Rafferty is a fictional character from the BBC Scotland soap opera River City, played by Laura O'Donnell. She was the first girlfriend of "Shellsuit" Bob O'Hara.

== Duncan Robertson ==
Duncan Robertson is a fictional character from the BBC Scotland soap opera River City, played by Kieron Elliott. He is described as a "hardman".

== Freya Robertson ==
Freya Robertson is a fictional character from the BBC Scotland soap opera River City, played by Natasha Watson. She left River City and moved to Australia.

== Colin Campbell ==
Doctor Colin Campbell is a fictional character from the BBC Scotland soap opera River City, played by Sean Kane between 2006 and 2012.

== Liam McNulty ==
Liam McNulty is a fictional character from the BBC Scotland soap opera River City, played by American actor Sean Kane in 2006. He is described as a "fiery chef and womaniser".

== Lena Krausky ==
Lena Krausky
- River City character
- Portrayed by: Anna Kerth
- Duration: 2006–2007

Lena Krausky is a fictional character from the BBC Scotland soap opera River City played by Anna Kerth.

== Liz Buchanan ==
Liz Buchanan
- River City character
- Portrayed by: Eileen McCallum
- Duration: 2006–2018
In-universe information
- Husband: Malcolm Hamilton
- Sons: Archie Buchanan

Liz Buchanan (also Hamilton) is a fictional character from the BBC Scotland soap opera River City, played by Eileen McCallum.

In 2010, she had to come to terms with the death of her son, Archie, whose body had been found buried in the boatyard, found out to be done by one of Lenny Murdoch's henchmen. In 2012 she married Malcolm Hamilton (Johnny Beattie). She is an old friend of Mary Murdoch (Judith Sweeney).

== Iona McIntyre ==
Iona McIntyre
- River City character
- Portrayed by: Claire Knight
- Duration: 2006–2012
In-universe information
- Sisters: Roisin McIntyre; Shona McIntyre

Iona McIntyre is a fictional character from the BBC Scotland soap opera River City, played by Claire Knight. She is the younger sister of Roisin McIntyre and Shona McIntyre.

In 2010, she returned to Shieldinch, but at first she couldn't cope with the idea of being back, however eventually she settled in again, and began running the Montego Deli. More recently, Iona has noticed how much Raymond has been missing her sister Shona, and so after thinking about her own life and after having a chat with Ruth Rossi (Morag Calder) her old friend, she decided to move in with her and get her own life back on track. After some worrying about Raymond, he told her to do what she had to do, and they agreed that it would be good for the both of them, so Iona moved out - but only across the street. Iona was a bigamist.

Claire Knight left the role in 2012.

== Madonna Mullen ==
Madonna Mullen is a fictional character from the BBC Scotland soap opera River City, played by Lauren Grace. She was created and introduced to River City in 2006. Madonna is the daughter of Scarlett Mullen and Jimmy Mullen. She is also, the half sister of Robert 'Shellsuit Bob' Adams, the niece of Bob O'Hara and the granddaughter of Molly O'Hara.

== Romeo Rossi ==
Romeo Rossi is a fictional character from the BBC Scotland soap opera River City. He was the young son of Joanne Rossi and Luca Rossi.

== Amber Murdoch ==
Amber Murdoch
- River City character
In-universe information
- Father: Lenny Murdoch
- Mother: Lydia Murdoch
- Half-brothers: Ewan Murdoch; Alex Murdoch

Amber Murdoch is a fictional character from the BBC Scotland soap opera River City, played by Jenny Hulse. In 2016, she took the role over from Lorna Anderson.

Amber is the daughter of Lenny Murdoch and his second wife Lydia Murdoch.

In 2010, Amber Murdoch developed feelings for her 'supposed' long lost brother, Lee, not realising that he wasn't her brother and just an actor who was hired by her father to make her mother happy. Amber was devastated when Lee left Shieldinch, however soon, she found out about Ewan's plans to get there father arrested, and after finding out about what her father had done over the years, she agreed to keep quiet and help Ewan.

== Lydia Murdoch ==
Lydia Murdoch
- River City character
- Portrayed by: Jacqueline Leonard
- Duration: 2007–2012, 2017–2019, 2022–2026
In-universe information
- Husband: Lenny Murdoch
- Daughters: Amber Murdoch
- Stepsons: Ewan Murdoch; Rory Murdoch; Alex Murdoch

Lydia Murdoch is a fictional character from the BBC Scotland soap opera River City, played by Jacqueline Leonard. She is the mother of Amber Murdoch and the wife of Lenny Murdoch. In 2022 she "returned from the dead". In January 2023, she was victim of sexual assault by Andrew Campbell-Baxter (Greg Powrie). The scenes were part of a storyline where a destructive storm hit Shieldinch.

== Richard Whiteside ==
Richard Whiteside
- River City character
- Portrayed by: Michael Nardone
- Duration: 2007–2008
In-universe information
- Occupation: police officer

DCI Richard Whiteside is a fictional character from the BBC Scotland soap opera River City played by Michael Nardone. Richard is a "crooked copper complicit in a murder case". He was written out in 2008 alongside Marty Green (Daniel Schutzmann). He was seduced into a honeytrap by undercover officer Jodie Banks (Kirsty Mitchell).

== Gerry McGrade ==
Gerry McGrade is a fictional character from the BBC Scotland soap opera River City, played by John Paul McGilvray.

Gerry was paralysed down one side after too much cocaine abuse caused him to have a stroke.
