= List of River City characters introduced in 2018–2019 =

River City is a BBC Scotland soap opera from Scotland. This is a list of characters who first appeared on the programme during 2018 and 2019.

== Bernie O'Hara ==
Bernie O’Hara
- River City character
- Portrayed by: Barbara Rafferty
- Duration: 2018–2024
In-universe information
- Mother: Molly O'Hara
- Sisters: Scarlett O'Hara; Theresa O'Hara
- Nephews: Bob O'Hara

Bernadette (Bernie) O'Hara is a fictional character from the BBC Scotland soap opera River City portrayed by Barbara Rafferty. Rafferty previously played Shirley Henderson between 2006 and 2008 before taking on the new role of Bernie in 2018.

Bernie is the eldest daughter of Molly O'Hara (Una McLean), sister of Scarlett O'Hara (Sally Howitt) and Theresa O'Hara (Maureen Carr) and auntie to Bob O’Hara (Stephen Purdon). She arrives in Shieldinch for the funeral of her sister Theresa.

In 2024, she is killed in a car crash.

== Lou Caplan ==
Lou Caplan
- River City character
- Portrayed by: Leslie Hart
- Duration: 2018–2023
In-universe information
- Father: Sonny Caplan
- Brothers: Logan Caplan

Louise 'Lou' Caplan is a fictional character from the BBC Scotland soap opera River City portrayed by Lesley Hart. The character appeared from 2018 to 2023.

She was a quick-tongued policewoman. Lou was killed off in 2023.

== Logan Caplan ==
Logan Caplan
- River City character
- Portrayed by: Kevin Main
- Duration: 2018–2019
In-universe information
- Father: Sonny Caplan
- Sisters: Lou Caplan

Logan Caplan is a fictional character from the BBC Scotland soap opera River City portrayed by Kevin Main. He is a chef.

== Sonny Caplan ==
Sonny Caplan
- River City character
- Portrayed by: Jimmy Chisholm
- Duration: 2018–2025
In-universe information
- Sons: Logan Caplan
- Daughters: Lou Caplan

Sonny Caplan is a fictional character from the BBC Scotland soap opera River City portrayed by Jimmy Chisholm. Sonny is the father of Lou Caplan (Leslie Hart) and Logan Caplan (Kevin Mains) and uncle of Angus Lindsay (Scott Fletcher).

== Isobel MacKenzie ==
Isobel MacKenzie
- River City character
- Portrayed by: Alison Peebles
- Duration: 2018–2019
In-universe information
- Daughters: Kim O'Hara

Isobel MacKenzie is a fictional character from the BBC Scotland soap opera River City portrayed by Alison Peebles.

She is the mother of Kim O'Hara (Frances Thorburn) and was introduced in a dementia storyline.

== Poppy Patterson ==
Poppy Patterson
- River City character
- Portrayed by: Lindsey Campbell (2018–2019); Kari Corbett (2023)
- Duration: 2018–2019, 2023
In-universe information
- Father: Dougie Patterson

Poppy Patterson is a fictional character from the BBC Scotland soap opera River City portrayed by Lindsey Campbell. During 2023, she was played by Kari Corbett.

Lawyer Poppy had a stalking storyline involving Cameron Christie (Michael Wallace).

== Lochlan Dunbar ==
Lochlan Dunbar
- River City character
- Portrayed by: Paul Luebke
- Duration: 2018

Doctor Lochlan Dunbar is a fictional character from the BBC Scotland soap opera River City portrayed by Paul Luebke, introduced in 2018.

== Joe Dunn ==
Joe Dunn
- River City character
- Portrayed by: Douglas Rankine
- Duration: 2019–2020
In-universe information
- Sisters: Jac Dunn

Joe Dunn is a fictional character from the BBC Scotland soap opera River City portrayed by Douglas Rankine, introduced in 2019.

Joe is a policeman who groomed Ruby McLean (Zindzi Hudson). He killed off by Maggie McLean (Kathryn Howden).

== Eve Christie ==
Eve Christie
- River City character
- Portrayed by: Victoria Liddelle
- Duration: 2019–2023
In-universe information
- Occupation: General practitioner
- Sons: Cameron Christie; Dylan Christie

Eve Christie is a fictional character from the BBC Scotland soap opera River City portrayed by Victoria Liddelle, introduced in 2019.

Eve is the general practitioner.

== Dylan Christie ==
Dylan Christie
- River City character
- Portrayed by: Sean Connor
- Duration: 2019–2021
In-universe information
- Mother: Eve Christie
- Brothers: Cameron Christie

Dylan Christie is a fictional character from the BBC Scotland soap opera River City portrayed by Sean Connor, introduced in 2019. He left in 2021.

His mother is the local GP Eve Christie.
