= List of River City characters introduced in 2008–2009 =

River City is a BBC Scotland soap opera from Scotland. This is a list of characters who first appeared on the programme during 2008 and 2009, listed in order of their first appearance.

== Ewan Murdoch ==
Ewan Murdoch
- River City character
- Portrayed by: Chris Brazier
- Duration: 2008–2010, 2022
In-universe information
- Father: Lenny Murdoch
- Mother: Mary Murdoch
- Stepmother: Lydia Murdoch
- Brothers: Rory Murdoch
- Half-brothers: Alex Murdoch
- Half-sisters: Amber Murdoch

Ewan Murdoch is a fictional character from the BBC Scotland soap opera River City played by Chris Brazier.

Ewan killed Ben, the fiancé of GP Sammi Amira, in a hit-and-run accident before covering up the crime and started a relationship with her.

In 2010, he plunged to his death from scaffolding. He returned for the 20th anniversary episode.

== Sonny Munro ==
Sonny Munro is a fictional character from the BBC Scotland soap opera River City played by Canadian actor Angus MacInnes.

== Viv Roberts ==
Viv Roberts
- River City character
- Portrayed by: Louise Jameson
- Duration: 2008
- First appearance: 19 June 2008
- Last appearance: 19 August 2008
In-universe information
- Occupation: Hairdresser

Viv Roberts is a fictional character from the BBC Scotland soap opera River City played by Louise Jameson. She is described as a "vivacious hairdresser". Viv arrives in 2008 intending to buy the hairdressing salon owned by Shirley Henderson.

== Tina Hunter ==
Tina Hunter
- River City character
- Portrayed by: Jenny Ryan
- Duration: 2008
In-universe information
- Husband: Eddie Hunter
- Sons: Jamie Hunter; Paul Hunter

Tina Hunter is a fictional character from the BBC Scotland soap opera River City played by Jenny Ryan.

Tina arrived in Shieldinch with her sons Paul and Jamie when there was a fire at their home. They lived temporarily with her ex-husband, DCI Eddie Hunter, in his flat, though since his murder they continued to live there. She is good friends with Scott Wallace, despite Scott being the man her husband came out as gay for. She was romantically linked to Billy Davies (Gray O'Brien) but believed her sons needed her attention more at a difficult time since their father's murder.

== Jamie Hunter ==
Jamie Hunter
- River City character
- Portrayed by: Anthony Martin
- Duration: 2008
In-universe information
- Father: Eddie Hunter
- Mother: Tina Hunter
- Brothers: Paul Hunter

Jamie Hunter is a fictional character from the BBC Scotland soap opera River City played by Anthony Martin. He is the son of Eddie Hunter (Derek Munn) and Tina Hunter (Jenny Ryan) and big brother to Paul Hunter (Sean Brown).

== Paul Hunter ==
Paul Hunter
- River City character
- Portrayed by: Anthony Martin
- Duration: 2008
In-universe information
- Father: Eddie Hunter
- Mother: Tina Hunter
- Brothers: Paul Hunter

Paul Hunter is a fictional character from the BBC Scotland soap opera River City played by Sean Brown. He is the son of Eddie Hunter (Derek Munn) and Tina Hunter (Jenny Ryan) and younger brother to Jamie Hunter (Anthony Martin).

== Charlie Drummond ==
Charlie Drummond
- River City character
- Portrayed by: June Brogan
- Duration: 2006–2008
In-universe information
- Mother: Jean Drummond

Charlie Drummond is a fictional character from the BBC Scotland soap opera River City, played by June Brogan. Charlie ditched Bob O'Hara (Stephen Purdon) at the altar. They planned to get married in a double wedding with Scarlett O'Hara (Sally Howitt) and Jimmy Mullen (Billy McElhaney).

== Jean Drummond ==
Jean Drummond
- River City character
- Portrayed by: Kate Donnelly
- Duration: 2008
In-universe information
- Daughters: Charlie Drummond

Jean Drummond is a fictional character from the BBC Scotland soap opera River City, played by Kate Donnelly.

== Mary Murdoch ==
Mary Murdoch
- River City character
- Portrayed by: Judith Sweeney
- Duration: 2008
- Appears in: 16 December 2008
In-universe information
- Husband: Lenny Murdoch (backstory)
- Sons: Ewan Murdoch; Rory Murdoch
- Stepsons: Alex Murdoch

Mary Murdoch is a fictional character from the BBC Scotland soap opera River City, played by Judith Sweeney. She is the ex-wife of Lenny Murdoch (Frank Gallagher).

Mary is an old friend of Liz Buchanan (Eileen McCallum).

== Shona Henderson ==
Shona Henderson
- River City character
- Portrayed by: Julie Duncanson
- Duration: 2006–2009
In-universe information
- Husband: Raymond Henderson

Shona Henderson (also McIntyre) is a fictional character from the BBC Scotland soap opera River City, played by Julie Duncanson. She died of a brain tumour.

== Eilidh Green ==
Eilidh Green is a fictional character from the BBC Scotland soap opera River City, played by Lily Walker.

Eilidh is the daughter of Ruth Rossi and Marty Green. She is the granddaughter of Gina Hamilton, the great-granddaughter of Malcolm Hamilton and the niece of Joanne Rossi.

== Father Mulvaney ==
Father Mulvaney, known as Michael 'Mick' Mulvaney, is a fictional character from the BBC Scotland soap opera River City, played by Laurie Ventry. He took over Father Dominic's duties when he left Shieldinch.

In 2024, he married Bernadette 'Bernie' O'Hara (Barbara Rafferty).

== Daniel McKee ==
Daniel McKee is a fictional character from the BBC Scotland soap opera River City, played by Ewan Stewart.

In 2010, he was given the chance to visit his estranged family in Ireland, and was thrilled at the prospect of meeting them. He was also happy to know that his wife Marianne would be meeting them, however after falling out, Marianne told him she was going with him, as she became increasingly interested in helping Lenny Murdoch whilst he was arrested. However, they made up, and Daniel and Marianne left for Ireland together to visit his family.

== Marianne McKee ==
Marianne McKee is a fictional character from the BBC Scotland soap opera River City, played by Frances Grey. She is a psychologist.

In 2010, she has been happy for her husband Daniel after wanting to meet his family. Marianne had become increasingly interested with Lenny Murdoch once again, and this annoyed Daniel, as he thought Marianne would run off with Lenny and help him with his personal problems, like Daniel once had. After an argument, Marianne told him that she would not visit his family with him Ireland, however they soon made up and she left for Ireland with him.

== Joe ==
Joe works at the 'Base' in the community centre which is a boxing club, where he is also a coach. In 2010, he coached Innes Maitland, until he was told by Marianne McKee during a match, that Innes had epilepsy and could not continue with his match. Joe has also been trying to help Daniel see that Marianne is only interested in people's minds and health and she does not mean anything by it.

== Ben Franklin ==
Ben Franklin
- River City character
- Portrayed by: John P. Arnold
- Duration: 2008

Ben Franklin is a fictional character from the BBC Scotland soap opera River City, played by John P. Arnold. He is the fiancé of Sammi Amira (Samia Rida).

Ben is run over and killed by Ewan Murdoch (Chris Brazier) on New Year's Eve.

== Sammi Amira ==
Sammi Amira
- River City character
- Portrayed by: Samia Rida
- Duration: 2009
- First appearance: 14 January 2009
- Last appearance: 20 January 2009
In-universe information
- Occupation: Doctor

Sammi Amira is a fictional character from the BBC Scotland soap opera River City, played by Samia Rida. Doctor Amira works in the surgery with her best friend Marianne McKee (Frances Grey).

== Charlie Bowie ==
Charlie Bowie is a fictional character from the BBC Scotland soap opera River City, played by Ryan Smith. He is introduced in June 2009 alongside his sister Jennifer Bowie (Lorna Craig) and their flatmate Innes Maitland (Sam Robertson).

Charlie Bowie has developed feelings for Amber Murdoch, but has not yet admitted them.

== Jennifer Bowie ==
Jennifer Bowie is a fictional character from the BBC Scotland soap opera River City, played by Lorna Craig. He is introduced in June 2009 alongside her brother Charlie Bowie (Ryan Smith) and their flatmate Innes Maitland (Sam Robertson).

Jennifer Bowie came to terms with her sexuality, after stupidly kissing Amber Murdoch (Jenny Hulse), and admitted to herself and her parents that she is in fact a lesbian.

== Innes Maitland ==
Innes Maitland is a fictional character from the BBC Scotland soap opera River City, played by Sam Robertson. Robertson is well known for playing Adam Barlow in Coronation Street. Innes is introduced in June 2009 alongside his flatmates, brother and sister Charlie Bowie (Ryan Smith) and Jennifer Bowie (Lorna Craig). Innes is an art history student.

Innes had to cope with the fact that he had epilepsy, and after ignoring his problems at first, he began to fully understand the seriousness of his condition if he continued to do boxing.

== Gordon Swan ==
Gordon Swan
- River City character
- Portrayed by: Sandy Welch
- Duration: 2009–2010
In-universe information
- Occupation: Hairdresser
- Daughters: Hayley McCrone

Gordon Swan is a fictional character from the BBC Scotland soap opera River City, played by Sandy Welch. He is the owner of a chain of salons.

In 2010, Swan finally admitted his feelings for Ruth Rossi (Morag Calder), and after Ruth had a bad valentines date with someone from the internet, Gordon stepped in and they shared a kiss, and from then on starting a relationship with her. Once again, Robbie Fraser from Gordon's salon, had developed feelings for Gordon, decided to try and break Ruth and him up, he did this by sending a text and a bunch of flowers, but after a conversation and some information from Scott, both Ruth and Gordon realised that Robbie was trying to break them up, and cause yet even more trouble. Soon, Gordon sacked Robbie, but after a heartfelt apology, Ruth told Gordon to reconsider, in which he did, and let Robbie have his job back.

== Hayley McCrone ==
Hayley McCrone
- River City character
- Portrayed by: Pamela Byrne
- Duration: 2009–2012
In-universe information
- Occupation: Hairdresser
- Father: Gordon Swan

Hayley McCrone is a fictional character from the BBC Scotland soap opera River City, played by Pamela Byrne. Hayley is a hairdresser.

Hayley appeared from 2009 to 2012.

== Robbie Fraser ==
Robbie Fraser is a fictional character from the BBC Scotland soap opera River City, played by Gary Lamont.

In 2010, after working at the salon for quite a bit of time, Robbie Fraser developed feelings for his boss Gordon, who was in fact his best friends father, who was in fact straight! However, after being devious and trying to break up Gordon and his partner Ruth Rossi for the second time, everybody found out and Robbie was ousted from the salon, however after admitting to what he had done and apologising for his actions, Gordon agreed to give him another chance.

Later, after a bet went wrong and both Robbie and Hayley got drunk at a party they were hosting, they slept together and didn't realise until the next morning, they agreed no one should know. However, Innes eventually told Jack, which led to Gordon finding out.

In 2012, he suffered domestic violence in a homosexual relationship. In 2014, he was involved in a homophobia storyline.

== Jack Paterson ==
Jack Paterson is a fictional character from the BBC Scotland soap opera River City, played by John Comerford.

== Murray Crozier ==
Murray Crozier is a fictional character from the BBC Scotland soap opera River City, played by Brian Cowan. Murray was a schoolteacher.

Murray dated Eileen Donachie (Deirdre Davis), but they broke up when Murray admitted they had nothing in common, but he didn't tell her that he had feelings for her sister Gina Hamilton who he shared more interests with.

== Stella Walker ==
Keira Lucchesi
- River City character
- Portrayed by: Keira Lucchesi
- Duration: 2009–16, 2022
In-universe information
- Brothers: Mark Walker

Stella Walker is a fictional character from the BBC Scotland soap opera River City, played by Keira Lucchesi. She left the role in 2016.

Stella was found on the streets, begging in 2009 by Derek 'Deek' Henderson (Gordon McCorkell) and he decided to take her in because she reminded him of his Mum. In 2010, Stella became friends with Deek, Robert 'Shellsuit Bob' Adams and the departed Nicki Cullen. She was very angry when she found out Bob had cheated on Nicki on a stag weekend he attended.

Stella has since been chucked out of Deek's home, after Molly, who is now living with them, spiked her drink with vodka, therefore Stella being able to control herself, this prompted Deek to tell her to leave. Stella came back, trying to prove her innocence to Deek, however after many failed attempts, she gave up, and walked away, even though Deek had found out that truth, and that, in fact, it was not Stella's fault at all.

== Bob O'Hara ==
Bob O'Hara
- River City character
- Portrayed by: Tom Urie
- Duration: 2009–14, 2016
In-universe information
- Mother: Molly O'Hara
- Sisters: Scarlett O’Hara

Bob O'Hara, known as Big Bob, is a fictional character from the BBC Scotland soap opera River City, played by Tom Urie.

After arriving in Shieldinch, Bob O'Hara was determined to stand on his own two feet, without his mother Molly O'Hara whose devious and controlling ways lead him to ask for help from his sister Scarlett Mullen, and with that Scarlett did all she could to help him, and he eventually gained the Janitor job at the community centre after making a good impression on Eileen Donachie. However, things took a turn for the worse when Bob's mother, Molly arrived and claimed to be ill and have hurt herself after being pushed out of her mobility scooter, which Scarlett suspects is a lie, therefore she wanted Bob back home as she knew she couldn't control him any longer.

Bob left River City in 2014.

== Molly O'Hara ==
Molly O'Hara
- River City character
- Portrayed by: Una McLean
- Duration: 2009–2019
In-universe information
- Sons: Big Bob O'Hara
- Daughters: Scarlett O’Hara

Molly O'Hara is a fictional character from the BBC Scotland soap opera River City, played by Una McLean. Molly was introduced in 2009.

Molly O'Hara recently came back to Shieldinch after finding out her son had left her to stand on his own two feet, but she eventually manipulated him and took him back home. However, Scarlett vowed never to give up, and so a few weeks later she decided to find him a job, which failed, yet he managed to get a job as a janitor at the community centre. Molly was furious after finding out Bob would be moving to Shieldinch, and so she came to the town herself, telling everyone she had been pushed out of her scooter and she was hurt, needing someone to look after her. Eventually, Bob saw what she was really like when himself and Scarlett found footage of her trashing the community centre, first seen by Eileen Donachie, and Molly was arrested. But, it was decided by the police that Molly would have to stay with Scarlett and her family. Molly also began causing more trouble when moving in with Bob and Deek, when she spiked Stella's juice after knowing she had a drink problem, but Deek thought Stella had done it herself, so he chucked her out, not realising until Bob found the vodka bottles under Molly's bed, after Stella had been trying to prove her innocence.

Molly left River City in 2019.

== Lee Hope ==
Lee Hope
- River City character
- Portrayed by: James Palmer
- Duration: 2009–2010
- First appearance: 24 November 2009
- Last appearance: 18 May 2010

Lee Hope is a fictional character from the BBC Scotland soap opera River City, played by James Palmer. Lee posed as the fake long lost son of Lydia Murdoch (Jacqueline Leonard). He dated Amber Murdoch (Lorna Anderson). However he was up to no good. He met his long-lost father.

== Michael Learmonth ==
Michael Learmonth
- River City character
- Portrayed by: Seamus Gubbins
- Duration: 2009–2012
In-universe information
- Occupation: Professor

Michael Learmonth is a fictional character from the BBC Scotland soap opera River City, played by Seamus Gubbins. Michael is a university lecturer.
