= List of River City characters introduced in 2014–2015 =

River City is a Scottish soap opera produced by BBC Scotland. This is a list of characters who first appeared on the programme during 2014 and 2015.

== Frank Paton ==
Frank Paton
- River City character
- Portrayed by: Paul Thomas Hickey
- Duration: 2014
In-universe information
- Occupation: Councillor

Frank Paton is a fictional character from the BBC Scotland soap opera River City played by Paul Thomas Hickey. Frank is a corrupt local councillor.

Frank Paton murders Raymond Henderson (Paul Samson).

== Patrick Adams ==
Patrick Adams
- River City character
- Portrayed by: Gerard Miller
- Duration: 2014–2017
- First appearance: 30 September 2014
In-universe information
- Father: Paddy Adams
- Stepmother: Scarlett O'Hara

Patrick Adams is a fictional character from the BBC Scotland soap opera River City played by Gerard Miller.

Patrick is the step-son of Scarlett O'Hara (Sally Howitt) from her first marriage to abusive ex-husband Paddy. He had a storyline about child sexual abuse. Patrick also dealt with confusion regarding his sexuality.

== Buster Doyle ==
Buster Doyle
- River City character
- Portrayed by: Grado
- Duration: 2015

Brian 'Buster' Doyle is a fictional character from the BBC Scotland soap opera River City played by Grado. He made his first appearance on 4 January 2015.

Like his actor, Buster is also a wrestler.

== Sandra Devlin ==
Sandra Devlin
- River City character
- Portrayed by: Caroline Paterson
- Duration: 2014–2015
In-universe information
- Occupation: Social worker

Sandra Devlin is a fictional character from the BBC Scotland soap opera River City portrayed by Caroline Paterson. In 2004, she played the role of Patricia Cullen. Sandra is described as a "no-nonsense social worker". She deals with the case of Finn Mackay (Sonny Green) and his foster parents Will Cooper (Scott Vickers) and Robbie Fraser (Gary Lamont).

== Finn Mackay ==
Finn Mackay
- River City character
- Portrayed by: Sonny Green
- Duration: 2014
- First appearance: 8 July 2014
- Last appearance: 19 August 2014
In-universe information
- Occupation: Schoolboy
- Half-sisters: Catriona

Finlay (Finn) Mackay is a fictional character from the BBC Scotland soap opera River City portrayed by Sonny Green. He has a conflict with his foster parents Will Cooper (Scott Vickers) and Robbie Fraser (Gary Lamont). Finn trashes Robbie's salon and self-inflicts injuries falsely accusing Will of attacking him.

== Alan Lindsay ==
Alan Lindsay is a fictional character from the BBC Scotland soap opera River City played by Stephen McCole.

In 2014 he joined alongside his son Angus Lindsay (Scott Fletcher) and daughter Kirsty Lindsay (Bobby Rainsbury).

== Angus Lindsay ==
Angus Lindsay is a fictional character from the BBC Scotland soap opera River City played by Scott Fletcher. He is the best friend of Bob O'Hara (Stephen Purdon).

In 2014 he joined alongside his father Alan Lindsay (Stephen McCole) and sister Kirsty Lindsay (Bobby Rainsbury).

== Kirsty Lindsay ==
Kirsty Lindsay is a fictional character from the BBC Scotland soap opera River City played by Bobby Rainsbury.

In 2014 she joined alongside her father Alan Lindsay (Stephen McCole) and brother Angus Lindsay (Scott Fletcher).

== Rhona Lindsay ==
Rhona Lindsay is a fictional character from the BBC Scotland soap opera River City played by Jo Freer. She is the estranged wife of Alan Lindsay (Stephen McCole) and mother to Angus Lindsay (Scott Fletcher) and Kirsty Lindsay (Bobby Rainsbury). Rhona left her family to move to Dubai.

== Caitlin McLean ==
Caitlin McLean
- River City character
- Portrayed by: Gayle Telfer-Stevens
- Duration: 2015–2026
In-universe information
- Children: Jenny, Drew and Ruby

Caitlin McLean is a fictional character from the BBC Scotland soap opera River City played by Gayle Telfer Stevens. Her character is described as fiery.

== Jenny McLean ==
Jenny McLean is a fictional character from the BBC Scotland soap opera River City played by Christine Steel. She is the daughter of single mother Caitlin.

== Drew McLean ==
Drew McLean
- River City character
- Portrayed by: Benjamin Nugent (2015–2017); Martin Bell (2024–2026)
- Duration: 2015–2017, 2024–2026
In-universe information
- Mother: Caitlin McLean
- Sisters: Jenny and Ruby

Drew McLean is a fictional character from the BBC Scotland soap opera River City. He was originally played by Benjamin Nugent before Martin Bell took the role in 2024.

In 2016, Drew was used in a storyline around self-harm. For the portrayal, River City won best soap award at the Mind Media Awards 2016.

== Ruby McLean ==
Ruby McLean
- River City character
- Portrayed by: Toniann Christie (2015–2018); Zindzi Hudson (2018–2022)
- Duration: 2015–2022
In-universe information
- Mother: Caitlin McLean
- Brothers: Drew McLean
- Sisters: Jenny McLean

Ruby McLean is a fictional character from the BBC Scotland soap opera River City. She was originally played by Toniann Christie before Zindzi Hudson took over the role in 2018. Ruby was groomed by police officer Joe Dunn (Douglas Rankine).

== Angel Delaney ==
Angel Delaney
- River City character
- Portrayed by: Hanna Stanbridge
- Duration: 2015–2016

Angel Delaney is a fictional character from the BBC Scotland soap opera River City played by Hanna Stanbridge.

== Erin Gunn ==
Erin Gunn
- River City character
- Portrayed by: Emma Hartley-Miller
- Duration: 2015
- First appearance: 7 April 2015
- Last appearance: 15 September 2015
In-universe information
- Occupation: Lawyer

Erin Gunn is a fictional character from the BBC Scotland soap opera River City played by Emma Hartley-Miller.

== AJ Jandhu ==
AJ Jandhu
- River City character
- Portrayed by: Sanjeev Kohli
- Duration: 2015–2022
In-universe information
- Occupation: Banker
- Wife: Annie Jandhu
- Sons: Harry Jandhu

Amandeep 'AJ' Jandhu is a fictional character from the BBC Scotland soap opera River City played by Sanjeev Kohli.

He is the husband of Annie Jandhu (Dawn Steele) and father of Harry Jandhu.

== Annie Murdoch ==
Annie Murdoch
- River City character
- Portrayed by: Dawn Steele
- Duration: 2015−2018
In-universe information
- Occupation: Doctor
- Husband: AJ Jandhu
- Sons: Harry Jandhu

Annie Murdoch (also Jandhu) is a fictional character from the BBC Scotland soap opera River City played by Dawn Steele.

She is the wife of AJ Jandhu (Sanjeev Kohli) and mother of Harry Jandhu. She had an affair with Alex McAllister (Jordan Young).

Annie left in 2018.

== Harry Jandhu ==
Harry Jandhu
- River City character
- Portrayed by: Manpreet Bachu (2015–2016); Ryaan Ali (2022)
- Duration: 2015–2016, 2022
In-universe information
- Father: AJ Jandhu
- Mother: Annie Jandhu

Harry Jandhu is a fictional character from the BBC Scotland soap opera River City played by Manpreet Bachu.

He is the husband of Annie Murdoch (Dawn Steele) and AJ Jandhu (Sanjeev Kohli).

== Alasdair Quinn ==
Alasdair Quinn is a fictional character from the BBC Scotland soap opera River City played by Michael Mackenzie. Alasdair is a charity shop owner.

== Gary Trenton ==
Gary Trenton
- River City character
- Portrayed by: James Mackenzie
- Duration: 2015–2017
In-universe information
- Daughters: Jenny McLean

Gary Trenton is a fictional character from the BBC Scotland soap opera River City played by James Mackenzie. He is the father of Jenny McLean.
