= Rob Jarvis =

English television and film actor

Robert S Jarvis (born 1965) is an English television and film actor. He is best known for his roles as Eddie in Hustle the long-running BBC series, Graham Shand in Luther and as Russell Posner in Emmerdale. He currently plays the part of Eddie Corrigan in the BBC Scotland production, River City. From the Wirral, he is frequently cast as a scouser.

== Partial filmography ==
- Casualty (1988–2008, TV series) as Philip / Vic Cheadle
- Call Red (1996, TV series) as DC Greer
- The Brittas Empire (1996, TV series) as Marine Park Man
- Jonathan Creek (1997–1998, TV series) as Tex / Wino
- The Bill (1997–2005, TV series) as John Orme
- Among Giants (1998) as Weasel
- The Broker's Man (1998, TV series) as Phillips
- Ultraviolet (1998, TV mini-series) as Maria's Contact
- The End (1998, short)
- Harbour Lights (1999, TV series) as Egbert
- The Darkest Light (1999) as Dick
- Elephant Juice (1999) as Boorish man
- People Like Us (1999, TV series) as The Police Officer
- Dalziel and Pascoe (2001, TV series) as Nigel Clifford
- Heartlands (2002) as Bob Derby
- The Bone Trade (2003, TV short) as Communist Leaders Collector
- Charles II: The Power and the Passion (2003, TV mini-series) as Kirkby
- Two Pints of Lager and a Packet of Crisps (2003–2004, TV Series) as Pete Smith
- Holby City (2003–2018, TV Series) as Sebastian Dublin / Eric Singleton / Callum Dewhurst
- Hustle (2004–2012, TV series) as Eddie
- Tripping Over (2006, TV series) as Bob
- Grownups (2006, TV series) as Tramp
- Waking the Dead (2008, TV series) as Michael Hurst,
- Waterloo Road (2009, TV series) as Environmental Health Inspector Neil Birmingham
- Luther (2010, TV Series) as Graham Shand
- Law & Order: UK (2012, TV series) as Frank Donovan
- Good Cop (2012, TV mini-series) as DCI Stoddart
- Death in Paradise (2013, TV series) as Colin Smith
- Silent Witness (2013, TV series) as Roly Henderson
- Doctor Who (2013, episode: "The Time of the Doctor") as Abramal
- Call the Midwife (2015 Christmas Special) as Walter Willens
- Father Brown (2016, episode 4.3: "The Hangman's Demise") as Henry Lee
- David Brent: Life on the Road (2016) as Client
- A Street Cat Named Bob (2016) as Peter Gruner
- Transformers: The Last Knight (2017) as Downing Street policeman
- Collateral (2018, TV mini-series) as DC Euan Johnson
- Emmerdale (2021, TV series) as Russell Posner
- A Gentleman in Moscow (2024, TV mini-series) as Halecki.
- River City (2024-present, TV series) as Eddie Corrigan
- The Gathering (2024, TV series) as Louis

== Other work (voiceovers) ==
Rob Jarvis is also one of the two main continuity and promo voices for the National Geographic Channel, in the UK. Rob is currently the voice of the Hyundai i20, and the RNLI adverts. In 2011, he narrated series 5 of ITV's Britain's Best Dish. In September 2016, Jarvis began narrating ITV's brand new Police Documentary 'Car Wars', following Northumbria Police's Traffic and newly established Dragoon Units. He also voices Emergency Helicopter Medics for Channel 4.
