= Kirsty Mitchell =

Scottish actress (born 1974)

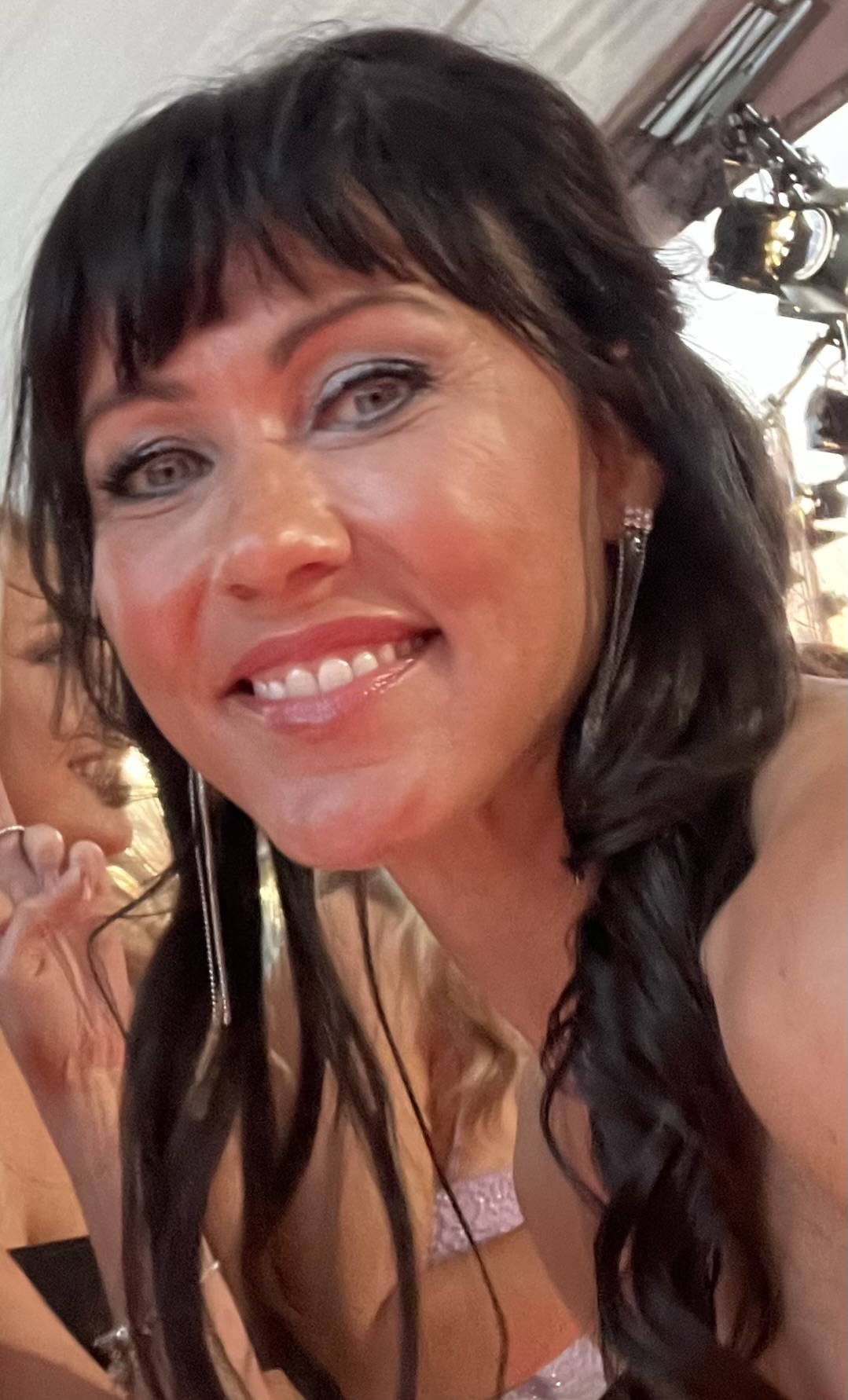
- Mitchell in 2024
- Born: Kirsty Loretta Mitchell; 28 June 1974 (age 51); Glasgow, Scotland
- Occupation: Actress
- Years active: 1996–present
- Television: Monarch of the Glen; River City; The Royal Today; Casualty

Kirsty Loretta Mitchell (born 28 June 1974) is a Scottish actress.

She is the voice of Mòrag Ladair in Xenoblade Chronicles 2. In 2019, she began appearing in the BBC medical drama series Casualty as Faith Cadogan.

== Early life ==
Mitchell was born in Glasgow and was a pupil at Park Mains High School in Erskine. She trained as a ballet dancer before turning to acting and won the Miss Scotland title at 17 years old.

== Filmography ==
Film and television roles
Year	Title	Role	Notes
1996	Small Faces	Maggie	
1998	The Acid House	Julie	
2000	A Shot at Glory	Kate McQuillan	
2001	The Pilot's Wife	Muire Boland	
2001	Attila	Honoria	
2001	Capone's Boys	Edith	
2003	I'll Be There	Nessie	
2003	Holby City	Anita Forbes	
2003	In Deep	Gina Delaney	
2004	Lighthouse Hill	Grace Angelini	
2004	Murphy's Law	DC Mel Kovacs	
2005	Dalziel and Pascoe	Nurse Shannon Hayes	Episode: "Heads You Lose"
2005	Monarch of the Glen	Iona	
2005	The Brief	Rachel Browning	
2006	River City	Jodie Banks	
2007	The Bill	Stacey Jackson	
2008	The Royal Today	Sarah Chatwin	
2008	New Tricks	Katie Briers	
2009	The Bill	Josie Hibbert	
2010	Lake Placid 3	Susan Bickerman	
2010	Triassic Attack	Emma Neil-Roundtree	
2011	Mercenaries	Beatrice	
2011	Silent Witness	Charlotte Jenkins	Episode: "First Casualty"
2014	Firequake	Slater Cappilla	
2015	Casualty	Gina Wilson	
2015	Hollyoaks	Sadie Bradley	
2016	Barbarians Rising	Boudica	
2016	New Blood	Caroline	
2017	The Hitman's Bodyguard	Harr	
2017	The Leisure Seeker	Jennifer Ward	
2018	Down a Dark Hall	Ginny Gordy-Dabrowski	
2019	Creation Stories	Susan McGee	
2019–present	Casualty	Faith Dean	
2020	Find Me in Paris	Quinn	

Video games
Year	Title	Role
2010	GoldenEye 007	Natalya Simonova (voice and likeness)
2011	El Shaddai: Ascension of the Metatron	Gabriel
2017	Xenoblade Chronicles 2	Mòrag Ladair
