= Paul Brannigan =

Scottish actor

- Born: 14 September 1986 (age 39); Glasgow, Scotland
- Occupation: Actor

Paul Brannigan (born 14 September 1986) is a Scottish actor best known for his roles as Gareth O'Connor in Scottish soap opera River City and as Robbie in the film The Angels' Share (2012). Brannigan also appeared in the 2013 movie Under the Skin.

== Early life ==
Brannigan was born in Glasgow, Scotland. He was brought up in the rough working-class East End Barrowfield area of Glasgow. Both of his parents were long-term drug addicts and much of his youth was spent amidst gang violence and petty crime. He was a gang member in Glasgow and served time in a young offenders institution.

== Career ==
Brannigan began his film career as Robbie in the 2012 Ken Loach dark comedy film, The Angels' Share, which is set largely in Glasgow and the Scottish Highlands. He was nominated for a BAFTA Scotland award for Best Actor for this role. Brannigan was originally cast in a one-off appearance in the BBC Scotland soap opera River City, but in spring 2013 returned for a recurring role as Gareth O'Connor. He left the programme in September 2013.

Brannigan had parts in the movies Under the Skin and Sunshine on Leith, and in 2014 appeared as Scotty in the fifth series of Irish crime drama Love/Hate and as Michael in the UK thriller Beyond.

== Personal life ==
Brannigan has one son. His cousin Kevin Brannigan, who also grew up in Barrowfield, is a drag artist.

Brannigan was arrested by officers from Police Scotland on New Year's Day 2020 following an assault on David Brannigan, thought to be Paul's brother. He appeared at Glasgow Sheriff Court where he was charged with assault to severe injury and permanent disfigurement. At court he made no plea and was released on bail pending a further hearing.

== Filmography ==
=== Film ===
Year	Title	Role	Notes
2012	The Angels' Share	Robbie	BAFTA Scotland Awards for Best Actor; Creative Scotland Award for Rising Star
2013	Sunshine on Leith	Ronnie	
2013	Under the Skin	Andrew	
2014	Beyond	Michael	
2015	Scottish Mussel	Fraser	
2017	Edie	McLaughlin	
2019	Roads	Alan	

=== Television ===
Year	Title	Role	Notes
2012–2013	River City	Gareth O'Connor	
2014	Love/Hate	Scotty	Series 5
2020	The Nest	Doddy	
