= Sam Robertson =

Scottish actor & model (born 1985)

Samuel J Robertson
- Born: 11 October 1985 (age 40); Dundee, Scotland, United Kingdom
- Occupations: Actor; model
- Years active: 2003-present
- Known for: Coronation Street (2004–2007, 2016–); Beaver Falls (2011–2012); Celebrity Big Brother 11 (2013)

Samuel Robertson (born 11 October 1985) is a Scottish actor and model from Dundee, Scotland. He is best known for portraying Adam Barlow in the ITV soap opera Coronation Street, and Flynn in the E4 comedy-drama series Beaver Falls.

== Background ==
Robertson was born in Dundee. He studied Drama and English at the University of Manchester, but dropped out at 18 to focus on his role as Adam Barlow in Coronation Street. He is a fan of Dundee FC.

== Career ==
In 2004, he joined the cast of Coronation Street as Adam Barlow and left in 2007.

In 2005 and 2006, he took part in the second and third series of Sky One's The Match.

In 2009, Robertson joined the BBC Scotland soap opera River City as new character Innes Maitland.

Robertson played Flynn in the E4 series Beaver Falls, which aired in July 2011 in the UK.

In January 2013, Robertson was a housemate in the eleventh series of Celebrity Big Brother on Channel 5 in the UK. He was the second evictee of the series.

In 2016, Robertson reprised his role as Adam Barlow in Coronation Street.

== Filmography ==
=== Film ===
Year	Title	Role
2011	Hot Hot Hot	Tiger
2013	Dementamania	Edward Arkham
2015	The Legend of Barney Thomson	Detective Sergeant Sam Jobson
2016	London Town	Tommy Gun

=== Television ===
Year	Title	Role
2003	Hollyoaks	HCC Student (extra; uncredited)
2004–2007, 2016–present	Coronation Street	Adam Barlow (570+ episodes)
2005–2006	The Match	Himself
2009	River City	Innes Maitland
2010	Push	Jake
2010	Being Victor	Danny Burton
2011–2012	Beaver Falls	Flynn/Andrew Spencer
2012	Bedlam	Dominic
2013	Celebrity Big Brother	Himself
2013	Celebrity Big Brother's Bit on the Side	Himself
2015	Stonemouth	Callum Murston

== Awards and nominations ==
Year	Award	Category	Result	Ref.
2017	Inside Soap Awards	Sexiest Male	Shortlisted	
