= Barbara Rafferty =

Scottish actress (born 1950)

- Born: Barbara Ann Brown; 15 January 1950 (age 76); Clydebank, Scotland
- Years active: 1973–present
- Spouse(s): Peter Rafferty (divorced); Sean Scanlan (widow)
- Children: Amy Rafferty, Bob Rafferty, Nick Rafferty
- Parent(s): David Brown, Betty Brown

Barbara Rafferty (born 15 January 1950 in Clydebank), is a Scottish actress. She was credited as Barbara Ann Brown in her early acting career. She portrayed Ella Cotter in the BBC Two sitcom Rab C Nesbitt, and both Shirley Henderson and Bernie O'Hara in the BBC Scotland soap opera River City. She played Agnes Meldon in mystery series Hamish MacBeth and Grandma Mainland in the CBeebies comedy Katie Morag.

== Career ==
Rafferty played Ella Cotter in Rab C Nesbitt between 1990 and 1999, and then again from 2008 and 2011 when the show made a comeback (and again in 2014). Other notable television roles include playing pub landlady Agnes Meldrum in Hamish Macbeth and Alice MacAllister in The Young Person's Guide To Becoming A Rock Star. She took over the role of Alice Taylor from Muriel Romanes in Take The High Road in 1988. Also, in the 2006 film The Last King of Scotland, Barbara Rafferty starred as Mrs. Garrigan. Until 2009 she was appearing in the BBC Scotland soap River City as Shirley Henderson and 2018 as Bernie O'Hara from 2018 to 2024 when she was killed in a car crash.

Barbara's daughter, Amy Rafferty (born 1972), is a singer, songwriter, and musician with the Glasgow music collective The Recovery Club.

Her son, Bob Rafferty, fronts the Glasgow alternative rock band El Dog.

In 2013 it was announced that Rafferty would join the cast of His Majesty's Theatre in Aberdeen Pantomime Cinderella with her friend Elaine C. Smith.

She portrayed Grandma Mainland in the CBeebies TV series, Katie Morag. It started airing on 3 November 2013.

== Theatre ==
Year	Title	Role	Company	Theatre	Director	Notes
1986	The Lass wi' the Muckle Mou	Grizel	Theatre Alba	Assembly Rooms, Edinburgh	Charles Nowosielski	play by Alexander Reid

== Filmography ==
Film
Title	Year	Role	Notes
The Wicker Man	1973	Woman with baby	Credited as Barbara Ann Brown
The Slab Boys	1997	Mrs. McCann	
The Acid House	1998	Dr. Callaghan	Segment: "The Acid House"
Women Talking Dirty	1999	Janine	
The Last King of Scotland	2006	Mrs. Garrigan	
Sir Billi the Vet	2006	Barbara the Jag	Voice
Perfect Sense	2011	Woman in car park	
Fast Romance	2011	Mrs. Livingston	
Sir Billi	2012	Barbara the Jag	Voice
The Legend of Barney Thomson	2015	Jean Monkrieff	
Television
Title	Year	Role	Notes
Tutti Frutti	1987	Woman in infirmary	Mini-series; Episode 3: "Gin a Body, Dig a Body"
Taggart	1988	Agnes Sweeney	Episode: "Double Jeopardy"
Take the High Road	1988–89	Alice Taylor	11 episodes
Your Cheatin' Heart	1990	Shirley	Series 1 - 5 episodes
Rab C. Nesbitt	1990–2014	Ella Cotter	Lead role; 10 series - 51 episodes
Doctor Finlay	1994	Flora	Series 2, Episode 6 - "In Arcadia"
Go Now	1995	Madge Cameron	Television film
The Tales of Para Handy	1995	Madam Isis	Series 2, Episode 1 - "The Fortune Teller"
Hamish Macbeth	1995–97	Agnes Meldrum	Lead role; 3 series - 20 episodes
The Young Person's Guide to Becoming a Rock Star	1998	Alice MacAllister	Series 1
Life Support	1999	Margaret McGovern	Series 1 - 2 episodes
Tinsel Town	2000	Jacqueline Donnelly	Series 1, Episode 1
Murder Rooms: The Dark Beginnings of Sherlock Holmes	2001	Mrs. Kitson	Episode: "The White Knight Stratagem"
Rockface	2002–03	Alice Urquhart	Series 1 & 2 - 5 episodes
Captain Abercromby	2002–03	Bobweb, various (voice)	Lead role; 26 episodes
Heartbeat	2003	Pam Astbury	Series 13, Episode 6 - "The Holiday's Over"
Sea of Souls	2004	Rena	Series 1 - 3 episodes
River City	2006–08	Shirley Henderson	
No Holds Bard	2009	Granny Braid	Television film
Garrow's Law	2009	Katherine Stanton	Series 1, Episode 3
Doctors	2009	Margaret Adams	Episode: "Once Upon a Time"
Doctors	2013	Beth Harris	Episode: "Saving Irene"
The Sunny	2014	Mrs. Dolan	Television pilot
Katie Morag	2013–15	Grandma Mainland	
Still Game	2016	Winnie Cranston	Episode: "Job"
River City	2018–2024	Bernadette 'Bernie' O'Hara	
The Scotts	2021–2024	Moira Scott	

Other appearances

- California Sunshine as Jessica (2014; short film)
- Missing as Rachel (2007; short film)
- Autumn Leaves as Mrs. McBride (1997; short film)
