= Kari Corbett =

Scottish actress, artist and filmmaker (born 1984)

- Born: 16 February 1984 (age 42); Paisley, Renfrewshire, Scotland
- Occupations: Actress, artist, filmmaker
- Years active: 2002–present

Kari Corbett (born 16 February 1984) is a Scottish actress, artist and filmmaker. Corbett is perhaps best known for portraying Ruby Hepburn in the Channel 4 comedy drama Shameless, Nurse Marian McKaig in ITV's The Royal, Sarah in the BAFTA award-winning Jeopardy, Kirsty in David Mackenzie's film, You Instead, Jean McGrory in CBC's comedy Mr. D and Evie Watt in the award-winning BBC drama Shetland. Kari has also appeared opposite fellow Scottish actor Brian Cox in Bob Servant.

In 2023 Kari will appear in The Swarm, produced by Frank Doelger (producer: Game of Thrones; Rome, on HBO/Hulu/SKY and Irvine Welsh's newest TV series, Crime, acting alongside Dougray Scott on ITVX/Apple TV+.

Kari was nominated for The Johnny Walker Great Scot Award for Outstanding Contribution to Entertainment in 2011, and selected as one of the 12 Rising Stars of 2012 by the Radio Times. Kari has produced two award-nominated short-films, screened at The Chicago Underground Film Festival, and The Glasgow Film Festival.

== Career ==
Corbett began acting at age 17, playing Sarah in Australian/UK co-production Jeopardy. She has recently completed The Swarm, produced by Frank Doelger (producer: Game of Thrones; Rome) and Irvine Welsh's Crime acting alongside Dougray Scott. Her other work Includes playing Ruby Maguire in Shameless; the Canadian comedy series Mr. D; Evie Watt in Shetland; Rubenesque; Case Histories; Nurse Marian McKaig in The Royal; You Instead; Monarch of the Glen; River City; The Inspector Lynley Mysteries; Katie Morag and Sea of Souls.

Radio Times named Corbett one of the 12 Rising Stars of 2012. Kari was nominated for The Johnny Walker Blue Label Great Scot award in 2011, for Outstanding Contribution to the Entertainment. Her first experimental video, Uncontrollable Joy For Life (2010), has been screened in various film festivals such as the 2011 Chicago Underground Film Festival. She produced, directed, and starred in the experimental short film If Only I Was Simone De Beauvoir (2011), which was nominated for Best International Short Film at the Glasgow Film Festival.

In 2023, Kari will appear in The Swarm, produced by Frank Doelger (producer: Game of Thrones; Rome, on HBO/Hulu/SKY and Irvine Welsh's newest TV series, Crime, acting alongside Dougray Scott on ITVX/Apple TV+.

== Personal life ==
Corbett studied at the Glasgow School of Art and the School of the Art Institute of Chicago, focusing on performance art and filmmaking. She graduated in 2011.

== Awards ==
Award	Year
Radio Times: 12 Rising Stars of 2012	2012
Nomination: The Johnny Walker Great Scot Award	2011
Nomination: GSSF Best International Short Film	2011
Jury Nominations: Chicago Underground Film Festival	2011

== Filmography ==
=== Film ===
Year	Title	Role	Notes
2010	Uncontrollable Joy For Life	Interviewer	Short film Co-director
2011	If Only I Was Simone De Beauvoir	Kari / Simone	Short film Director
2012	You Instead	Kirsty	

=== Television ===
Year	Title	Role
2002–2003	River City	Kirsty Henderson
2002–2005	Jeopardy	Sarah Fitzwilliam
2004	Doctors	Kerry McLeish
2004	The Inspector Lynley Mysteries	Vi Nevin
2004–2005	Monarch of the Glen	Zoe
2006	Sea of Souls	Kelly Tudor
2007	The Whistleblowers	Laura Johnson
2007–2009	The Royal	Nurse Marian McKaig
2011–2012	Shameless	Ruby Hepburn
2013	Case Histories	DI Zoe Chalmers
2013	Mr. D	Jean McGrory
2013	Bob Servant Independent	Vote Counter
2014	Shetland	Evie Watt
2014	Rubenesque	Hazel
2015	Katie Morag	Candice Kennedy
2023	The Swarm	Iona
2023	Crime	Penny Acton
2023–2024	River City	Poppy Patterson
