= Jimmy Chisholm =

Scottish actor (born 1965)

- Born: 16 September 1956 (age 70); Inverness, Scotland
- Occupation: Actor
- Years active: 1977–

Jimmy Chisholm (born 16 September 1956 in Inverness) is a Scottish actor in film, theatre, television and radio. He trained as an actor at Queen Margaret University’s School of Drama in Edinburgh. He played the part of Sonny Caplan from 2018 to 2025 in the BBC Scotland production, River City. He played Jimmy Blair from 1980 to 1986 in Scottish Television's long-running soap opera Take the High Road. In film, his credits include Braveheart (1995), as Faudron, and Mrs Brown (1997), as Mr Grant. On the stage, Chisholm is mostly associated with the Royal Lyceum Theatre which he calls his "acting home".

Chisholm was Assistant Director for the Fifth Estate Theatre Company's production of Allan Sharpe's play The Burgher's Tale at the Netherbow Theatre in 1994.

== Theatre ==
Year	Title	Role	Theatre	Director	Notes
1987	The Pied Piper	Goggle	Lyttelton Theatre	Alan Cohen	
1988–1989	Ladybird		Theatre Royal, Bath	Ann Pennington	
1991	Hamlet		Brunton Theatre, Musselburgh	Charles Nowosielski	play by William Shakespeare
1991	The Massacre of Tranent	Nicol Outerside	Brunton Theatre, Musselburgh	Charles Nowosielski	play by Raymond Ross
1995	Amadeus	Mozart	Dundee Repertory Theatre	Richard Baron	play by Peter Shaffer
1997	Roberto Zucco	Detective	Stratford-upon-Avon Theatre	James Macdonald	play by Bernard-Marie Koltès
1997–1998	Measure for Measure	Pompey	Stratford-upon-Avon Theatre	Michael Boyd	play by William Shakespeare
1997–1998	The Merchant of Venice		Stratford-upon-Avon Theatre	Gregory Doran	play by William Shakespeare
1998	Measure for Measure	Pompey	Stratford-upon-Avon Theatre	Michael Boyd	
1998	The Merchant of Venice	Launcelot Gobbo	Theatre Royal, Plymouth	Gregory Doran	
1998	Measure for Measure	Pompey	Theatre Royal, Plymouth	Michael Boyd	
8 December 1998	The Merchant of Venice	Launcelot Gobbo	Barbican Theatre, London	Gregory Doran	
20 January 1999	Measure for Measure	Pompey	Barbican Theatre, London	Michael Boyd	
7 April 1999	Roberto Zucco	Detective / Girl's Father	Pit, London	James Macdonald	
26 October – 16 November 2002	The Taming of the Shrew	Petruchio	Lyceum Theatre, Edinburgh	Tony Cownie	play by William Shakespeare
20 August – 11 September 2004	Oliver! the Musical	Fagin	Perth Theatre	Ken Alexander	stage musical by Lionel Bart
9 December 2005 – 7 January 2006	Sleeping Beauty	Nurse Mcuddles /Fairy Nuff	Perth Theatre	Ian Grieve	
8 December 2006 – 6 January 2007	Cinderella	Written /Senga	Perth Theatre	Ian Grieve	
7 December 2007 – 5 January 2008	Sinbad and the Last Princess	Written / Sally Doolally	Perth Theatre	Ian Grieve	written by Jimmy Chisholm and Ian Grieve
31 January – 16 February 2008	Of Mice and Men	George	Perth Theatre	Ian Grieve	
2009	The Silver Darlings		His Majesty's Theatre, Aberdeen	Kenny Ireland	Peter Arnott's adaptation of the novel by Neil M. Gunn
2014	3000 Trees	Willie MacKay	Grey Coast Productions	Libby McArthur	play by George Gunn
5–26 April 2016	Neither God Nor Angel	James VI	Òran Mór & Traverse Theatre	Ryan Alexander Dewar	play by Tim Barrow
May – 11 June 2016	Thon Man Molière	Molière	Lyceum Theatre, Edinburgh	Tony Cownie	play by Liz Lochhead
10 February – 4 March 2017	The Winter's Tale	Autolycus	Lyceum Theatre, Edinburgh	Max Webster	play by William Shakespeare
16 – 31 December 2022	Aladdin	Widow Twankey	Beacon Arts Centre		

== Radio ==
Year	Title	Role	Director	Station	Notes
14 December 1997	The Secret Commonwealth	Andrew Lammie / fairy voice	Patrick Rayner	BBC Radio 4	play by John Purser

== Filmography ==
=== Film ===
Year	Title	Role	Notes
1995	Braveheart	Faudron	
1997	Mrs Brown	Mr Grant	
2001	Strictly Sinatra	Kenny	
2004	One Last Chance	Harry	
2005	Festival	Radio Producer	
2012	The Angels' Share	Volunteer Taster	
2014	I.Q YOU	Joe's Step Dad	

=== Television ===
Year	Title	Role	Notes
1977	The Mackinnons	Andrew Muir	1 episode
1980–1986	Take the High Road	Jimmy Blair	Series regular
1983	The Gaffer	Hagerty	1 episode
1987	Dramarama	TV Director	1 episode
1987, 1993, 1999, 2005	Taggart	Malcolm McWhinnie/Derek Kennedy/McNab/Dr. Thomas Finn	
1988	Chelmsford 123	Scot	1 episode
1988	The Campbells	Donald Fraser	1 episode
1991, 1993	Screen Two	'Playtime' Presenter/Colin	
1992	The Advocates	Disk Jockey	1 episode
1993	The Bill	Eric Honeywell	1 episode
1994, 1997	Rab C. Nesbitt	Nick/Leslie	
1995, 1996	Hamish Macbeth	Tartan Salesman/Christie McMurray	
1996	Dangerfield	Chilton	1 episode
1997	Ivanhoe	Wamba	Main role
1997	The Broker's Man	Lofty	1 episode
2000	The Cops	Doug Fulman	2 episodes
2014	Holby City	Richie Miles	1 episode
2018, 2021	Shetland	Alec MacBay	3 episodes
2018–2025	River City	Sonny Caplan	Series regular
2021	Scot Squad	Jim	1 episode

== Bibliography ==
- Elder, Michael (1990). Ten Years of Take the High Road. London: Boxtree. ISBN 978-1-85283-109-7.
