= Caroline Paterson =

Scottish actress

- Born: Kirkcaldy, Scotland,
- Occupations: Actress, director
- Years active: 1985–present

Caroline Paterson is a Scottish actress and director who has appeared in many Scottish television shows such as one-off STV drama, The Steamie and the BBC's Rab C. Nesbitt. Also Laura in an episode of Hamish Macbeth. However, she is most recognised for her role in EastEnders as Ruth Fowler. She also appeared as Patricia Cullen in BBC Scotland soap River City. In 2005 she had a one episode appearance in the BAFTA award-winning BBC series Spooks as Jessica Mortimer. In 2008, Paterson appeared in Coronation Street as police detective DC Weller after David Platt pushed his mother, Gail down the stairs of their home, and again in December 2008 to investigate allegations against Tony Gordon. She had a cameo role in the sixth season of Skins as the mother of Franky. She also appeared in River City, as Sandra Devlin.

== Theatre ==
Year	Title	Role	Company	Director	Notes
1987	The Gorbals Story	Nora Reilly	7:84	David Hayman	play by Robert McLeish
