= James Allenby-Kirk =

Scottish actor, comedian and writer

- Born: 1988 (age 37–38); Paisley, Renfrewshire, Scotland
- Other name: James Kirk
- Occupations: Actor, comedian, writer

James Allenby-Kirk or simply James Kirk (born 1988) is a Scottish actor, comedian and writer. He is best known for his roles as Jeff the Chef in the comedy Gary: Tank Commander and as Stosh in the drama series 24: Live Another Day.

== Career ==
Born in Paisley, Renfrewshire, he was educated at Williamsburgh Primary and Paisley Grammar School. He later attended Langside College, studying acting and performance.

Kirk made his breakthrough into the comedy circuit by winning the "So You Think You're Funny?" competition in 2010. His first television appearance came in 2010, when he played Malky in Rab C. Nesbitt. He also appeared in Channel 4's "Comedy Blaps" series, in which he wrote and starred in the short online sketches "Kronicles of Kirk." However, it was in Greg McHugh's BAFTA award-winning sitcom Gary: Tank Commander, in which he played Jeff the Chef, that he was brought to the attention of a wider audience.

Following appearances in television shows such as Bob Servant Independent and the TV film "Two Doors Down", he starred in two comedies for BBC Scotland. The first, entitled "Scot Squad" came as a result of a successful pilot episode in late 2012. The first series of the show aired in late 2014. Kirk also worked on the comedy "How Do I Get Up There?" alongside his co-stars Chris Forbes and Kevin Mains, which was shown in Scotland during November 2014.

== Television ==
- River City - Paul Ames (2020–2021)
- Outlander (2017–2018) - Hayes - Season 4–5, 9 episodes
- How Do I Get up There? (2014)
- Scot Squad (2014–2023)
- Don't Drop the Baton (2014)
- Bob Servant (2013)
- Gary Tank Commander (2011–12)
- Pramface (2012)
- Rab C. Nesbitt (2010)
- Chewin' The Fat(1999–2005)
- Still Game (2002–2019)

== Radio Work ==
- Only an Excuse
- The Ellis and Clarke Show
- All the Milkman's Children

== Awards ==
- Winner: So You Think You're Funny? (2010)
- Nominated: Best Scottish Comedian, Scottish Variety Awards (2011, 2012)
