= The Match (TV series) =

British reality television series

The Match is a reality TV show on Sky One in which a group of celebrities form a football team to compete against a team of former professional footballers (The Legends). The show begins with a large squad of celebrities who train and live together, all aiming to be selected for "The Match" against the team of legends. The show has also been published in Switzerland in 2006 and 2008 on SF 2.

In Great Britain, three editions of the programme have been made, one in early 2004, one in late 2005 and one in October 2006. The programme is hosted by Mark Durden-Smith, Ulrika Jonsson (2004) and Zoë Ball (2005 & 2006). The matches are played at St James' Park, Newcastle. In the Swiss version, the matches were held at Espenmoos in St. Gallen (2006) and at Allmend Stadion in Lucerne (2008).

== Participants ==
The show features one of English football's best known managers, Graham Taylor, who manages the celebrity team. Players on the legends team have included Ally McCoist, Matt Le Tissier and John Barnes, among others. Notable members of the celebrities team have included Jonathan Wilkes, Ralf Little, Andy Scott-Lee, Philip Olivier, MC Harvey, Terry Alderton and Darren Campbell. The Match has never been won by the celebrities - losing 2-1 in 2004 and 2-0 in 2005 and 2006. The only goal the celebrities have ever scored was one that many believe to be a fluke by Jonathan Wilkes when his apparent cross looped over the head of 63-year-old goalkeeper Peter Bonetti.

In Switzerland, the Celebrities ("Die Promis") lost 1-6 against the Legends ("Die Legenden") in 2006 and 1-2 in 2008.

== The Match: Series 3 (2006) ==
Series 3 of The Match was shown during September and October 2006.

=== Participants ===
- Martin Offiah
- Chris Hollins
- Rocky Marshall (dropped in public vote on 6 October)
- Leo Ihenacho (dropped in public vote on 2 October)
- Blair McDonough
- Craig Kelly
- James Hooton (dropped due to injury on 3 October)
- Brian McFadden (dropped in public vote on 4 October)
- Ralf Little
- Jeff Brazier
- Anthony Hutton
- Tommy Craig
- MC Harvey
- Michael Greco (dropped in public vote on 5 October)
- Glenn Lamont
- Darren Campbell
- Danny Young
- Mark Bosnich
- Alex Lawler
- Sam Robertson
- Alec Stewart (Captain)

=== Final match ===
==== Celebrities starting XI ====
Name	Position	Fame
Mark Bosnich	Goalkeeper	Ex- Manchester United F.C. and Chelsea F.C. goalkeeper
Danny Young	Fullback (Right)	Coronation Street
Alec Stewart	Defender (Centre) (Captain)	Former England Cricketer
Thomas Craig	Defender (Centre)	Coronation Street
Ralf Little	Fullback (Left)	Actor
Anthony Hutton	Winger (Right)	Big Brother Series 6 winner
Chris Hollins	Midfielder (Centre)	Sports journalist
Jeff Brazier	Midfielder (Centre)	Television presenter
MC Harvey	Winger (Left)	Musician
Sam Robertson	Striker	Coronation Street
Darren Campbell	Striker	Athlete

==== Legends starting XI ====
Name	Position	Notable Clubs
Andy Goram	Goalkeeper	Rangers, Manchester United
Denis Irwin	Fullback (Right)	Manchester United, Oldham Athletic, Wolverhampton Wanderers
Colin Hendry	Defender (Centre)	Blackburn Rovers, Manchester City, Rangers
Des Walker	Defender (centre)	Nottingham Forest, Sheffield Wednesday, Sampdoria
Nigel Winterburn	Fullback (Left)	Arsenal, Wimbledon, West Ham United
Chris Waddle	Winger (Right) (Captain)	Newcastle United, Sheffield Wednesday, Olympique Marseille, Tottenham Hotspur
David Batty	Midfielder (centre)	Leeds United, Blackburn Rovers, Newcastle United
Gary McAllister	Midfielder (centre)	Leeds United, Liverpool, Leicester City, Coventry City
Paul Merson	Winger (Left)	Arsenal, Middlesbrough, Aston Villa, Portsmouth, Walsall
Ian Rush	Striker	Chester City, Liverpool, Juventus, Leeds United, Newcastle United
Peter Beardsley	Striker	Liverpool, Newcastle United, Everton, Bolton Wanderers, Fulham

8 October 2006
20:25

Celebrities	0–2	Legends
		Rush 17"; Waddle 57"

St James' Park
Attendance: 52,000

==== Match report ====
The Celebrities started the match on top and, for the first 15 minutes, had the vast majority of possession and goal chances. However, when Ian Rush scored for the Legends (a goal typical of his predatory style during his playing career) on 17 minutes, the game turned in the favour of the ex-professionals. For the remainder of the match the Legends used their superior passing ability and vision to keep hold of the ball and keep the Celebrities chances to a bare minimum. The commentary team even mentioned that it had become the most one-sided match in the short history of this fixture.

Celebrity winger MC Harvey was sent off late in the game for a second bookable offence. Upon leaving the field he had a row with goalkeeping coach Tony Coton which sparked aggression between many players and staff of both teams. This explosive reaction from Harvey seemed to amuse some of the Legends players, such as Paul Gascoigne who was seen laughing and making hand gestures.

== Match history ==
Year	Winner	Scorers	Runner-up	Scorers	Score	Venue	Attendance
2004	Legends	Gary Pallister (45'); Ally McCoist (90' + 4')	Celebrities	Jonathan Wilkes (85')	2–1	St James' Park	52,000
2005	Legends	Nigel Winterburn (5'); Ally McCoist (67')	Celebrities	—N/a	2–0	St James' Park	52,000
2006	Legends	Ian Rush (17'); Chris Waddle (57')	Celebrities	—N/a	2–0	St James' Park	52,000

== See also ==
- FC Nerds
- The Club (Australian reality show)
