= Glen Wallace =

TV actor from Northern Ireland

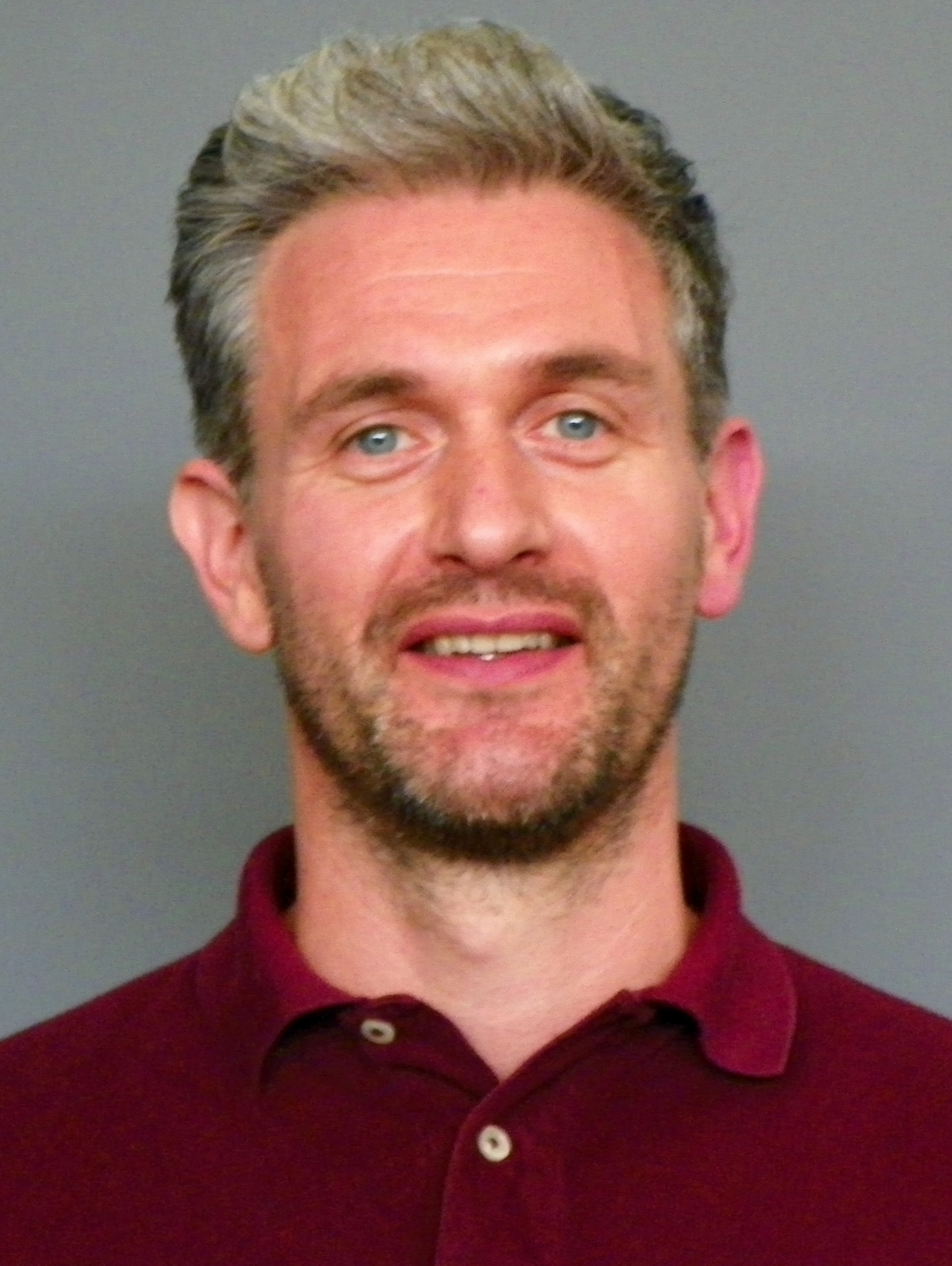
- Wallace in 2016
- Born: Ballymena, Northern Ireland
- Occupation: Actor
- Years active: 2003–present
- Television: Hollyoaks; EastEnders; River City; Coronation Street; Jamie Johnson

Glen Wallace is an actor from Northern Ireland. He is known for playing Malachy Fisher on the Channel 4 soap opera Hollyoaks.

== Career ==
In 2007, Wallace made his debut appearance in the Channel 4 soap opera Hollyoaks as Malachy Fisher. After a three-episode appearance, he was contracted as a series regular. In 2010, Wallace was nominated for Best Actor and Best Dramatic Performance at the British Soap Awards. Wallace quit Hollyoaks later in 2010, and made his final appearance on 18 November 2010, where his character Malachy died from serious injuries after an explosion from the local restaurant. Wallace appeared in two episodes of Holby City as Andy Bryan in August 2011. From 2014 to 2016, he appeared in the BBC soap opera EastEnders as DS Cameron Bryant. In December 2016, Wallace joined the Scottish soap opera River City as series regular Greig Roth, a role he played until 2018. In 2021, he joined the cast of the ITV soap opera Coronation Street as Lucas. He has also been in Jamie Johnson since the show moved production to Wales in series 4 when he first joined playing as Duncan Jones, the owner of the football club called Phoenix FC.

== Awards and nominations ==
Year	Award	Category	Work	Result	Ref.
2010	The British Soap Awards	Best Actor	Hollyoaks	Nominated	
2010	The British Soap Awards	Best Dramatic Performance	Hollyoaks	Nominated	
2010	TV Quick and Choice Awards	Best Soap Actor	Hollyoaks	Nominated	
