= Orphans (1998 film) =

- Film poster
- Directed by: Peter Mullan
- Written by: Peter Mullan
- Produced by: Paddy Higson
- Starring: Douglas Henshall; Gary Lewis; Rosemarie Stevenson
- Cinematography: Grant Scott Cameron
- Music by: Craig Armstrong
- Production company: Ardmore
- Release dates: 3 September 1998 (Venice); 7 May 1999 (United Kingdom); 10 March 2000 (limited)
- Running time: 102 minutes
- Country: United Kingdom
- Language: English

Orphans is a 1998 Scottish black comedy film written and directed by Peter Mullan and starring Douglas Henshall, Gary Lewis and Rosemarie Stevenson.

This was the first full-length film directed by Mullan, who later won a Best Actor award at Cannes for My Name is Joe, and who went on to direct The Magdalene Sisters and Neds. He has said that the film is not autobiographical, but that he wrote the film shortly after the death of his mother, and that each of the four main characters represent an element of what he was feeling at the time.

The film was funded by Channel 4 Films, the Scottish Arts Council National Lottery Fund, and the Glasgow Film Fund. The soundtrack includes music by Craig Armstrong, and Billy Connolly singing Mairi's Wedding and two songs he wrote for the film.

== Plot ==
On a grey day in Glasgow, Scotland, three brothers and their disabled sister meet to arrange their mother, Mrs Flynn's, funeral. Afterwards, they go to a public house and an incident occurs which separates the four and causes one to go on the search for a gun and one to pass off their stab wound as a work injury. The eldest brother stays overnight at the church to prepare for the funeral as their sister's wheelchair breaks down in a dark alleyway, causing her to be stranded and alone, desperate for help. What occurs is a journey of virtue and sin for each of them that will prove to them how much they truly miss their mother.

== Cast ==
- Douglas Henshall as Michael Flynn
- Gary Lewis as Thomas Flynn
- Rosemarie Stevenson as Sheila Flynn
- Stephen McCole as John Flynn
- Frank Gallagher as Tanga

== Release ==
The film was first shown at the 1998 Venice Film Festival in the International Film Critics' Week section. Having funded production, Channel Four Films decided not to distribute the film as they did not think it would attract a large commercial audience.

In interviews, Mullan has said that once Orphans started winning awards, Channel Four apologised and asked if they could distribute it, an offer he refused.

== Reception ==
On review aggregator website Rotten Tomatoes, Orphans has an approval rating of 47% based on 19 reviews.

In a review that awarded the film two-and-a-half stars out of four, Roger Ebert commented that the film has an uneven tone. He wrote, "On one hand it tells the gritty story of three brothers and their handicapped sister in Glasgow, Scotland, in the 24 hours after their mother dies. On the other hand, it involves events that would be at home in a comedy of the absurd. When the sister's wheelchair topples a statue of the Virgin Mary and the damage is blamed on high winds that lifted the roof off a church, we have left the land of realism." In contrast, Mick LaSalle of the San Francisco Chronicle reviewed the film positively, saying it "deals with grief and family in sensitive ways, while consistently coming up with moments of absurd comedy that somehow fit".

== Accolades ==
The won four awards for Mullan: the Cult Network Italia Prize, the Isvema Award, the Kodak Award and the Prix Pierrot. In 1998, it also won prizes at the Gijón International Film Festival, and the British Independent Film Awards. It won the Grand Prix at the 1999 Festival du Film de Paris and won Mullan the Best Newcomer Award at the 2000 Evening Standard British Film Awards.

== Musical adaptation ==
In 2021, it was announced that the film had been adapted into a musical with the National Theatre of Scotland. It was adapted by Douglas Maxwell with original music written and composed by Roddy Hart and Tommy Reilly. The show starred Robert Florence, Reuben Joseph, Dylan Wood and Amy Conachan amongst others. The show opened at the SEC Armadillo in Glasgow in April 2022 to a very positive reception.
