= List of River City characters introduced in 2012–2013 =

River City is a BBC Scotland soap opera from Scotland. This is a list of characters who first appeared on the programme during 2012 and 2013.

== Miriam Stubbs ==
Miriam Stubbs
- River City character
- Portrayed by: Kate Rutter
- Duration: 2012–2013
- First appearance: 3 April 2012
- Last appearance: 20 August 2013
In-universe information
- Occupation: Doctor

Dr. Miriam Stubbs is a fictional character from the BBC Scotland soap opera River City portrayed by Kate Rutter.

== Alice Reynolds ==
Alice Reynolds
- River City character
- Portrayed by: Sophie Mercer
- Duration: 2012

Alice Reynolds is a fictional character from the BBC Scotland soap opera River City portrayed by Sophie Mercer. She is the girlfriend of Christina O'Hara.

== Jake Munro ==
Jake Munro
- River City character
- Portrayed by: Russell Barr
- Duration: 2012

Jake Munro is a fictional character from the BBC Scotland soap opera River City portrayed by Russell Barr.

== Frances McCabe ==
Frances McCabe
- River City character
- Portrayed by: Andrea Hart
- Duration: 2012

Frances McCabe is a fictional character from the BBC Scotland soap opera River City portrayed by Andrea Hart.

== Sandy McKinnon ==
Sandy McKinnon
- River City character
- Portrayed by: Robert Cavanah
- Duration: 2012
In-universe information
- Wife: Annie Sobacz

Sandy McKinnon is a fictional character from the BBC Scotland soap opera River City portrayed by Robert Cavanah. He is the violent husband of Annie Sobacz.

== Dan Hunter ==
Dan Hunter
- River City character
- Portrayed by: Adam Robertson
- Duration: 2012–2015
In-universe information
- Occupation: Doctor

Dr Dan Hunter is a fictional character from the BBC Scotland soap opera River City played by Adam Robertson. Dan is a doctor in Shieldinch. Doctor Hunter left in May 2015.

== Suzie Fraser ==
Suzie Fraser
- River City character
- Portrayed by: Bridget McCann (2012–2013); Juliet Cadzow (2016–2024)
- Duration: 2012–2013, 2016–2024
In-universe information
- Sons: Robbie Fraser

Suzie Fraser is a fictional character from the BBC Scotland soap opera River City. Suzie was played by Juliet Cadzow from 2016 to 2024.

She is the mother of Robbie Fraser.

== Sean Kennedy ==
Sean Kennedy
- River City character
- Portrayed by: James Cunningham
- Duration: 2012

Sean Kennedy is a fictional character from the BBC Scotland soap opera River City portrayed by James Cunningham.

Sean runs over and kills Derek Henderson. As part of River City’s 10th anniversary celebrations, a dramatic episode saw landlord Raymond Henderson (Paul Samson) blow up the Tall Ship pub in order to cover up his murder of criminal Sean.

== Jamie McAllister ==
Jamie McAllister
- River City character
- Portrayed by: Mark Rowley
- Duration: 2012
In-universe information
- Uncles: Billy Kennedy
- Aunts: Mandy Kennedy

Jamie McAllister is a fictional character from the BBC Scotland soap opera River City played by Mark Rowley. He was involved in a rape accusation storyline. He was accused by barmaid Zinnie Hassoun (Nalini Chetty). The case went to trial in February 2014.

== Billy Kennedy ==
Billy Kennedy
- River City character
- Portrayed by: Alexander Morton
- Duration: 2012
In-universe information
- Wife: Mandy Kennedy
- Nephews: Jamie McAllister

Billy Kennedy is a fictional character from the BBC Scotland soap opera River City played by Alexander Morton.

Billy is the husband of Mandy Kennedy and uncle of Jamie McAllister (Mark Rowley).

== Mandy Kennedy ==
Mandy Kennedy
- River City character
- Portrayed by: Julie Austin
- Duration: 2012–2014
In-universe information
- Husband: Billy Kennedy

Mandy Kennedy is a fictional character from the BBC Scotland soap opera River City played by Julie Austin from 2012 to 2014.

She is the wife of gangster Billy Kennedy.

== Alex Murdoch ==
Alex Murdoch
- River City character
- Portrayed by: Jordan Young
- Duration: 2013
In-universe information
- Other names: Alex Mcallister
- Father: Lenny Murdoch
- Mother: Martina Kennedy
- Stepmother: Lydia Murdoch
- Half-brothers: Ewan Murdoch; Rory Murdoch
- Half-sisters: Amber Murdoch
- Uncles: Billy Kennedy

Alex Murdoch (also McAllister) is a fictional character from the BBC Scotland soap opera River City played by Jordan Young. Alex joined in 2013.

He is the son of Lenny Murdoch.

== Gareth O'Connor ==
Gareth O'Connor
- River City character
- Portrayed by: Paul Brannigan
- Duration: 2012

Gareth O'Connor is a fictional character from the BBC Scotland soap opera River City played by Paul Brannigan.

== Mark Walker ==
Mark Walker
- River City character
- Portrayed by: Fin MacMillan
- Duration: 2012
In-universe information
- Sisters: Stella Walker

Mark Walker is a fictional character from the BBC Scotland soap opera River City played by Fin MacMillan. He is the brother of Stella Walker.
