= Michael Nardone =

Scottish actor (born 1967)

- Born: 20 January 1967 (age 59); Ballingry, Fife, Scotland
- Occupation: Actor

Michael Nardone (born 20 January 1967) is a Scottish actor. He was raised in Ballingry, Fife, and trained in Drama at Queen Margaret College in Edinburgh.

Nardone starred as Mascius in the BBC/HBO/RAI TV series Rome and appeared as DCI Richard Whiteside in BBC Scotland drama River City.

His many stage credits include Macbeth and King Lear for the Royal National Theatre and Stitchers by Esther Freud at the Jermyn Street Theatre alongside Sinéad Cusack.

== Theatre ==
Year	Title	Role	Company	Director |	Notes
1996	Cyrano de Bergerac	Ligniere	Communicado, with Lyceum Theatre, Edinburgh	Gerry Mulgrew and Andy Farrell	translation by Edwin Morgan

== Selected filmography ==
- Soft Top Hard Shoulder (1992) – Stevie
- Being Human (1994) – Raider
- Wycliffe (1998, TV Series) – PC Joe Duggan
- The Bill (1998–2008, TV Series) – Gordon McCardle / Everett / Jeremy Dyson
- The Match (1999) – Dingus
- The Miracle Maker (2000) – (voice)
- Silent Witness (2002, TV Series) – PC Shaun Nicholson
- Dot the I (2003) – Detective 2
- Steel River Blues (2004, TV Series) – Dave Tanner
- Rome (2005–2007, TV Series) – Mascius
- Skins (2008, TV Series) – Sandy Jenkins
- Merlin (2009, TV Series) – Kendrick
- Jinx (2009, TV Series) – Mike / Mr Peckgrind
- Durham County (2010, TV Series) – Ivan Sujic
- Ben Hur (2010, TV Mini-Series) – Hortator
- Combat Kids (2010, TV Series) – Steve
- Mercenaries (2011) – Radovic
- Intruders (2011) – Frank
- The Somnambulists (2011) – Man 3
- The Field of Blood (2013, TV Series) – DI Michael Gallagher
- Wayland's Song (2013) – Wayland
- Line of Duty (2014, TV Series) – O'Neill
- Shetland (2014, TV series) – Donnie Tulloch
- National Theatre Live: King Lear (2014) – The Duke of Cornwall
- Child 44 (2015) – Semyon Okun
- The Night Manager (2016, 2026, TV Mini-Series) – Frisky
- Whisky Galore! (2016) – Brown
- Rogue One (2016) – Shield Gate Officer
- Clique (2018, TV Series) – Alec McStay
- Care (2018, TV Movie) - Nick
- Traces (2019, TV Series) – DI Neil McKinven
