= List of River City characters introduced in 2004–2005 =

River City was a BBC Scotland soap opera from Scotland. This is a list of characters who first appeared on the programme during 2004 and 2005, listed in order of their first appearance.

== Harry Black ==
Harry Black
- River City character
- Portrayed by: Carter Ferguson
- Duration: 2004–2008
In-universe information
- Occupation: Police officer

Harry Black is a fictional character in the BBC Scotland soap, River City played by Carter Ferguson from 2004 to 2008. PC Black is a police officer.

== Jimmy Mullen ==
Jimmy Mullen (played by Billy McElhaney) made his first appearance in 2004.

In 2010, Jimmy has been battling with his wife Scarlett O'Hara (Sally Howitt) for her to take more of an interest in her mother, as Jimmy cannot see her controlling and devious ways. In 2011, Jimmy got involved with drugs.

== Patricia Cullen ==
Patricia Cullen (played by Caroline Paterson) made her first appearance in 2004. In 2014, she re-joined the cast playing social worker Sandra Devlin.

Patricia is the mother of Nicki Cullen and Zoe Cullen.

== Frank McKenna ==
Frank McKenna is a fictional character from the BBC Scotland soap opera River City, played by Jon Morrison.

He was the solicitor of Heather Bellshaw (Jenni Keenan Green) who was on trial for the murder of Dr Marcus McKenzie.

== Lenny Murdoch ==
Lenny Murdoch
- River City character
In-universe information
- Wife: Mary Murdoch; Lydia Murdoch
- Sons: Ewan Murdoch; Rory Murdoch; Alex Murdoch
- Daughters: Amber Murdoch

Lenny Murdoch (played by Frank Gallagher) made his first appearance in 2005. He is married to Lydia Murdoch (Jacqueline Leonard).

In 2022, he appeared in a special two-part episode focusing on his past.

== Andrew Murray ==
Andrew Murray (played by Sam Heughan) made his first appearance in 2005. Andrew was an aspiring footballer.

== Zoe Cullen ==
Zoe Cullen
- River City character
- Portrayed by: Laura McMonagle
- Duration: 2005–2008
In-universe information
- Sisters: Nicki Cullen

Zoe Cullen (played by Laura McMonagle) made her first appearance in 2005.

== Carly Fraser ==
Carly Fraser
- River City character
- Portrayed by: Michelle O'Brien
- Duration: 2005–2008
In-universe information
- Mother: Lola Fraser

Carly Fraser is a fictional character from the BBC Scotland soap opera River City, played by Michelle O'Brien.

== Lola Fraser ==
Lola Fraser
- River City character
- Portrayed by: Suzanne Bonnar
- Duration: 2005
In-universe information
- Daughters: Carly Fraser

Lola Fraser is a fictional character from the BBC Scotland soap opera River City, played by Suzanne Bonnar. She is a single mother to her daughter Carly and has been a single mum since Carly's dad died.

== Glenn McAllister ==
Glenn McAllister
- River City character
- Portrayed by: John Macaulay
- Duration: 2005
In-universe information
- Occupation: The Grill emplyoee

Glenn McAllister is a fictional character from the BBC Scotland soap opera River City, played by John Macaulay. Glenn was Lola's boyfriend.

== Marty Green ==
Marty Green
- River City character
- Portrayed by: Daniel Schutzmann
- Duration: 2005–2008
In-universe information
- Occupation: Businessman
- Wife: Ruth Rossi

Marty Green is a fictional character from the BBC Scotland soap opera River City played by Daniel Schutzmann. Marty is married to Ruth Rossi (Morag Calder).

He was written out in 2008 alongside Richard Whiteside (Michael Nardone).

== Graeme Macdonald ==
Graeme Macdonald
- River City character
- Portrayed by: Gordon Kennedy
- Duration: 2005
- First appearance: 6 December 2005
- Last appearance: 6 December 2005

Graeme 'Mac' Macdonald is a fictional character from the BBC Scotland soap opera River City played by Gordon Kennedy.

His wife Alice was sent to jail after she tried to frame the schoolteacher for child pornography.

== Donna McCabe ==
Donna McCabe
- River City character
- Portrayed by: Paula Sage
- Duration: 2005
In-universe information
- Family: McCabe

Donna McCabe is a fictional character from the BBC Scotland soap opera River City played by Paula Sage. Like her character Sage has Down syndrome.

== Agnes McCabe ==
Agnes McCabe is a fictional character from the BBC Scotland soap opera River City played by Kay Gallie. She is described as a gangster matriarch. She planned the murder of Lenny Murdoch (Frank Gallagher).

== Steph McKenzie ==
Steph McKenzie is a fictional character from the BBC Scotland soap opera River City played by Emma Campbell Webster. She is the daughter of murdered Dr Marcus McKenzie (Stefan Dennis).

== Alanna McVey ==
Alanna McVey is a fictional character from the BBC Scotland soap opera River City played by Jade Lezar. She is the daughter of Raymond and Roisin.

Alanna is involved in a child sexual abuse storyline. She is a member of the girl gang of Zoe Cullen (Laura McMonagle).

== Luca Rossi ==
Luca Rossi is a fictional character from the BBC Scotland soap opera River City played by Argentine actor Juan Pablo Di Pace. He is a "runaway love cheat".

== Ajay ==
Ajay is a fictional character from the BBC Scotland soap opera River City played by Roshan Rohatgi. He is the brother of Zak.

== Zak ==
Zak is a fictional character from the BBC Scotland soap opera River City played by Zak Hanif. He is the brother of Ajay. He is the fiance of Alisha Shah.

== Alisha Shah ==
Alisha Shah
- River City character
- Portrayed by: Meneka Das
- Duration: 2005
In-universe information
- Family: Shah
- Brothers: Arun Shah; Dilip Shah

Alisha Shah is a fictional character from the BBC Scotland soap opera River City played by Meneka Das.

== Arun Shah ==
Arun Shah
- River City character
- Portrayed by: Ricky Dhillon
- Duration: 2005
In-universe information
- Family: Shah
- Brothers: Dilip Shah
- Sisters: Alisha Shah

Arun Shah is a fictional character from the BBC Scotland soap opera River City played by Ricky Dhillon.

== Dilip Shah ==
Dilip Shah
- River City character
- Portrayed by: Aron Sidhu
- Duration: 2005
In-universe information
- Family: Shah
- Brothers: Arun Shah
- Sisters: Alisha Shah

Dilip Shah is a fictional character from the BBC Scotland soap opera River City played by Aron Sidhu.
