= Eileen McCallum =

Scottish actress

Eileen McCallum MBE
- Born: Eileen McCallum; 2 December 1936 (age 89); Glasgow, Scotland
- Spouse: Tom Fidelo (m. 1960; div. 1997)
- Children: 4

Eileen McCallum, MBE (born 2 December 1936) is a Scottish retired actress who is best known for playing the part of shopkeeper Isabel Blair through the complete run of soap opera Take the High Road from 1980 to 2003, and as Liz Hamilton from 2005 to 2018 in the BBC Scotland soap River City.

== Career ==
McCallum appeared in Glasgow drama Just Another Saturday in 1975. She then gained her first major soap role in Garnock Way playing Jean Ross from 1976 to 1979.

Garnock Way was axed to be replaced by Take the High Road, which was first aired on 19 February 1980 with McCallum taking one of the lead roles as village storekeeper Isabel Blair through the programme's full run from 1980 to 2003. Series creator Don Houghton praised McCallum and her co-star Marjorie Thomson for their clarity as speakers of the Scots dialect, an essential attribute of their respective roles in the programme. McCallum was appointed an MBE for her services to drama in the 1992 New Year Honours.

Other notable roles include playing Dolly in the television version of Tony Roper's The Steamie and guest appearances in programmes such as Rebus, Still Game and New Tricks. She has also worked on radio. In 2006, she joined the cast of the BBC Scotland soap opera River City as Liz Buchanan, then later Hamilton. In 2015, she appeared as Mrs Gaffney in The Legend of Barney Thomson.

After 12 years in River City, McCallum retired from the role in May 2018. She lives in Edinburgh and runs a trust about Duchenne muscular dystrophy, due to having two grandsons with the disease.

== Theatre ==
Year	Title	Role	Company	Director	Notes
1972	Willie Rough	Kate	Lyceum Theatre, Edinburgh	Bill Bryden	
1972	Kidnapped	Mrs. Stewart	Lyceum Theatre, Edinburgh	Bill Bryden	adaptation by Keith Dewhurst

== Bibliography ==
- Elder, Michael (1990). Ten Years of Take the High Road. London: Boxtree. ISBN 978-1-85283-109-7.
- Houghton, Don (1982). Take the High Road. Edinburgh: Mainstream. ISBN 978-0-906391-34-1.
