= List of River City characters introduced in 2020–2021 =

River City is a BBC Scotland soap opera from Scotland. This is a list of characters who first appeared on the programme during 2020 and 2021.

== Paul Ames ==
Paul Ames
- River City character
- Portrayed by: James Allenby-Kirk
- Duration: 2020–2021

Paul Ames is a fictional character from the BBC Scotland soap opera River City portrayed by James Allenby-Kirk.

== Cameron Christie ==
Cameron Christie
- River City character
- Portrayed by: Michael Wallace
- Duration: 2020–2021
In-universe information
- Mother: Eve Christie
- Brothers: Dylan Christie

Cameron Christie is a fictional character from the BBC Scotland soap opera River City portrayed by Michael Wallace.

Cameron stalked Poppy Patterson.

== Jac Dunn ==
Jac Dunn
- River City character
- Portrayed by: Charlene Boyd
- Duration: 2020–2021
In-universe information
- Brothers: Joe Dunn

Jac Dunn is a fictional character from the BBC Scotland soap opera River City portrayed by Charlene Boyd. She is a police officer.

== Rebecca Fleming ==
Rebecca Fleming
- River City character
- Portrayed by: Jamie Marie Leary
- Duration: 2020–2023

Rebecca Fleming is a fictional character from the BBC Scotland soap opera River City portrayed by Jamie Marie Leary.

== Jessie McAllister ==
Jessie McAllister
- River City character
- Portrayed by: Kirsty Pickering
- Duration: 2020–2023
- Appears on: 30 March 2020
In-universe information
- Father: Alex Murdoch
- Grandfathers: Lenny Murdoch

Jessie McAllister is a fictional character from the BBC Scotland soap opera River City portrayed by Kirsty Pickering. Jessie is held hostage by Tyler Foulkes.

== Tyler Foulkes ==
Tyler Foulkes
- River City character
- Portrayed by: Cameron Fulton
- Duration: 2020–present
In-universe information
- Father: Harry Foulkes
- Mother: Vivienne Barton
- Brothers: Darren Foulkes

Tyler Foulkes is a fictional character from the BBC Scotland soap opera River City portrayed by Cameron Fulton.

== Darren Foulkes ==
Darren Foulkes
- River City character
- Portrayed by: Sammy Hayman
- Duration: 2021–2022
- First appearance: 6 September 2021
- Last appearance: 8 June 2022
In-universe information
- Father: Harry Foulkes
- Mother: Vivienne Barton
- Brothers: Tyler Foulkes

Darren Foulkes is a fictional character from the BBC Scotland soap opera River City portrayed by Sammy Hayman.

== Karen Connolly ==
Karen Connolly
- River City character
- Portrayed by: Claire Dargo
- Duration: 2021–2026

Karen Connolly is a fictional character from the BBC Scotland soap opera River City portrayed by Claire Dargo.

Her storylines include having a non-binary child and discovering her pregnancy was actually ovarian cancer.

== Sam Spiller ==
Sam Spiller
- River City character
- Portrayed by: Grant Stott
- Duration: 2021–present

Sam Spiller is a fictional character from the BBC Scotland soap opera River City portrayed by Grant Stott.

He is the long-lost father of Stevie O'Hara (Iain Robertson).

== Ash King ==
Ash King
- River City character
- Portrayed by: Brian James Leys
- Duration: 2021–2024

Ash King is a fictional character from the BBC Scotland soap opera River City portrayed by Brian James Leys.

== Barry Khatri ==
Barry Khatri
- River City character
- Portrayed by: Parmy Singh
- Duration: 2021–2023

Barry Khatri is a fictional character from the BBC Scotland soap opera River City portrayed by Parmy Singh.

== Duncan Campbell-Baxter ==
Duncan Campbell-Baxter
- River City character
- Portrayed by: John Bett
- Duration: 2021–2022

Duncan Campbell-Baxter is a fictional character from the BBC Scotland soap opera River City portrayed by John Bett.
