= Jacqueline Leonard =

Scottish actress

- Education: London Academy of Music and Dramatic Art
- Occupation: Actress
- Television: Peak Practice; EastEnders; Doctors; River City; Coronation Street
- Spouse: Alex Mansfield

Jacqueline Leonard is a British actress. She is known for her various roles in British soap operas, including Lorraine Wicks in the BBC soap EastEnders, Caroline Powers in the BBC medical soap Doctors, Lydia Murdoch in the Scottish soap River City and Linda Hancock in the ITV soap Coronation Street. She also appeared in the ITV medical drama Peak Practice.

== Early life ==
She grew up near Bathgate and Falkirk. Leonard trained at the London Academy of Music and Dramatic Art and was the winner of the Michael Warre Award for Best Actress in 1988.

== Career ==
Leonard has been appearing on British television since the early 1990s. She has had roles in May to December in 1992, A Time to Dance in 1992, Inspector Morse in 1993 and Peak Practice 1993 to 1996, where she played Sarah Preston for four series. Following this, she was cast as Lorraine Wicks in the BBC soap opera EastEnders, a role she played from 1996 to 1997. She took a year off work when she left EastEnders to move from London to Lancashire and care for her sick mother.

Leonard was then cast in the BBC medical soap opera Doctors, where she played one of the original characters, Caroline Powers, from 2000 to 2001. She then appeared in various other series including Nice Guy Eddie (2002), Holby City (2003), The Bill (2004), The Courtroom (2004), Goldplated (2006) Hollyoaks (2007) and Holby City (2010). In 2007, Leonard joined the cast of the BBC Scotland soap opera River City playing Lydia Murdoch. She quit the role in 2010, before reprising it in 2017. Producers killed off her character in 2019, but in 2022, she reprised the role, with her return being explained as Lydia having faked her death.

In 2011, Leonard auditioned and was shortlisted for the role of Stella Price in Coronation Street but lost out to former EastEnders actress Michelle Collins. In 2014, it was announced that she was joining Coronation Street as Linda Hancock, the ex-wife of established character Owen Armstrong and mother of Katie Armstrong and Izzy Armstrong. She appeared in 2015, but reprised the role from 2022 to 2023. Her film credits include Chaplin (1992), ID (1995), There's Only One Jimmy Grimble (1999) and The Wicker Tree (2011). On stage she has appeared in Look Back in Anger, The Taming of the Shrew, A Midsummer Night's Dream, A Clockwork Orange, Wuthering Heights and Behind the Green Curtain.

== Filmography ==
Year	Title	Role	Notes
1992	May to December	Mrs Colding	Episode: "I'm Old Fashioned"
1992	A Time to Dance	Theresa Kennedy	3 episodes
1992	Chaplin	Yankee Doodle Dancer	Film
1992	Screen Two	Gwen	Episode: "Memento Mori"
1993	Full Stretch	Lisa Nelkin	Episode: "Ivory Tower"
1993	Inspector Morse	Miss Sarah Spillers	Episode: "The Day of the Devil"
1993–1996	Peak Practice	Sarah Preston	Main role
1995	Ghosts	Sara	Episode: "Three Miles Up"
1995	ID	Jaq	Film
1996	In Suspicious Circumstances	Kathleen Smith	Episode: "The Silent Witness"
1996–1997	EastEnders	Lorraine Wicks	Regular role
1999	Maisie Raine	Sally Murphy	Episode: "Old Scores"
2000	There's Only One Jimmy Grimble	Kath	Film
2000–2001	Doctors	Dr. Caroline Powers	Regular role
2002	Nice Guy Eddie	Norma	1 episode
2003	Holby City	Gwen Baker	Episode: "Mum's the World"
2004	The Bill	Tina Taylor	1 episode
2006	Goldplated	Faye Blonde	Main role
2007	Hollyoaks	Valerie Holden	1 episode
2007–2012, 2017–2019, 2022–2026	River City	Lydia Murdoch	Regular role
2010	Holby City	Jackie Eddon	Guest role
2011	Waterloo Road	Pamela Dunbar	1 episode
2011	The Wicker Tree	Lady Delia Morrison	Film
2012	Stepping Up	Miss Pearce	Episode: "Home Games"
2014	Casualty	Judith Miles	Episode: "Born Lucky"
2015, 2022–2024	Coronation Street	Linda Hancock	Recurring role
