= Frank Gallagher (actor) =

Scottish actor

- Born: Francis Gallagher; 8 July 1962 (age 64); Coatbridge, Scotland
- Occupation: Actor
- Years active: 1989–present
- Known for: River City (2005 - 2026); Silent Scream (1990); Taggart (1990–2010)

Francis Gallagher (born 8 July 1962) is a Scottish actor who has played many roles since 1989 on stage, film, and television. Primarily active on the theatre stage for the first twenty years of his career, he is most recently and popularly known for portraying the gangster, Leonard "Lenny" Murdoch, in BBC Scotland's award winning drama River City.

== Personal life ==
Frank Gallagher was born 1962 in Coatbridge, Scotland, where he also grew up, one of five children. His father died at age 35, leaving Frank and his siblings—aged 5, 4, 3, 2, and 10 months—in the sole care of their mother. Frank attended St. Monicas Primary School "as all the family did," but he also spent a great deal of his childhood in hospitals, due to "very bad asthma." He reports his first "abiding" memory as being in the hospital: "I was singing the Beatles, for some reason."

According to Gallagher, he performed well enough in his first and second years after primary school, but illness kept him out of school in his third year, and when he returned, "it wasn't really a revision...it was just like catch-up, so I caught up, right over the fence; just didn't bother going much. I got caught at that a few times, and then by the time I got intae 4th year, they just thought, "look if ya don't like comin', don't come," so I didn't." Gallagher's love of history, English and modern studies didn't seem to provide the kind of knowledge that would help with finding a career, which led to his dismissal of education at the time.

Coming of age in Coatbridge in the late 1970s was difficult from a socio-economic perspective, as the town had relied heavily on steel mills, which were all closing, leaving career options and futures uncertain. Gallagher had started drinking around age 13, and by his late-teens had got into some trouble requiring a court appearance, which ultimately directed him to working on-stage: it was Gallagher's self-admitted flippant response to his probation officer--who had asked Gallagher what he thought he'd like to do with his life--that he fancied becoming a performer of some sort, "actin' or singin' or whatever." This led to involvement in youth theatre groups, which eventually developed into a career path, via a successful audition at the Royal Scottish Academy of Music and Drama.

Gallagher finished drama school in 1987; his first part on stage came in 1988 with John Cairney’s musical about Robert Burns, Scot Free. He cites his "lucky break" as the part he landed with Peter Mullan's Orphans in 1997.

Frank Gallagher married and had a son in the early 1990s.

Frank is a fan of Celtic F.C. & Greenock Morton F.C. and lists his hobbies as reading, watching movies, going to the gym, and swimming; he also won a karaoke competition in Saville performing Elvis Presley's "Burning Love." Frank has described Billy Joel's "Goodnight Saigon" as a song of interest because "it explains things [the situations of the Vietnam War] so well...from both sides."

== Notable Appearances ==
Prior to Gallagher's current television success with River City, he had recurring roles in Taggart, first as "Bruce McKenzie" (1990), then as "DI Malcolm" (1995), and later playing other characters throughout the run of the programme, lastly credited in 2010 appearing as "Charlie Muir."

He appeared as "Tanga" in the motion picture film, Orphans, a 1998 Scottish black comedy. Frank Gallagher also starred in The Fall of Shug McCracken, which won the Best Comedy award at the 2003 Santa Monica Film Festival.

As part of the 7:84 Theatre Company, Gallagher played "Bobby" in the 2004 stage production of Reasons To Be Cheerful, a Martin McCardie play, adapted from Mark Steel's book of the same name, directed by Stuart Davids.

== TV ==
Title	Character	Production	Notes
Taggart	Bruce McKenzie/DI Malcolm/Charlie Muir	STV	1990 - 2010; various roles and characters
Sea of Souls	DS Crowther	BBC One	2004; "Seeing Double" parts 1 & 2
River City	Lenny Murdoch	BBC Scotland	2005–Present
Cracked	Frank	STV	2008; episodes 1-6
How Not To Live Your Life	Mr. Bitchman	BBC Three	2008; series 1, episodes 1-4
