= River City (TV series) =

Glasgow-based soap opera (since 2002)

- Genre: Soap opera
- Created by: Stephen Greenhorn
- Starring: Present and former cast
- Opening theme: River City theme (2020)
- Ending theme: River City theme (2020)
- Country of origin: United Kingdom (Scotland)
- Original languages: English; Scots
- No. of episodes: 1,500+

Production
- Producer: Martin McCardie
- Production locations: Dumbarton, Scotland
- Camera setup: Multiple camera setup
- Running time: 30–60 minutes
- Production companies: BBC Studios Continuing Drama Productions; BBC Scotland

Original release
- Network: BBC One Scotland; BBC Two Scotland; BBC Scotland
- Release: 24 September 2002 – 31 August 2026

River City is a Scottish television soap opera created by Stephen Greenhorn which had been broadcast on BBC One Scotland for 24 years from 24 September 2002 until 31 August 2026.

From 2019 onwards, River City aired episodes a day earlier on the new BBC Scotland channel.

The soap was set in the fictional district of Shieldinch in the West End of Glasgow, the programme centred around the stories of local residents and their families as they went about their daily lives.

From its inception in 2002, the soap struggled to grasp viewers' approval, but would gradually see a rise in popularity. In 2023, the soap won 'Best Drama' at the Royal Television Society Scotland awards.

== History ==
In 2000, BBC Scotland were in talks of launching its own serial drama for Scotland. With the success of the BBC's other soap operas EastEnders and Holby City, which was launched the year before, the corporation opened to independent producers but later decided to open an in-house bid.

The BBC invited Stephen Greenhorn, who had finished working on the Glasgow Kiss for the BBC that year, to help develop the soap.

When deciding where to set the new soap, the BBC thought Glasgow was the "obvious option" but were worried it was too overexposed and they were looking at other locations. Greenhorn suggested Edinburgh, but the BBC raised concerns that setting it in Edinburgh "wouldn't connect emotionally". The only other large cities left were Dundee and Aberdeen, but these were ruled out. He thought setting it in the likes of Stirling "simply wouldn't work". Greenhorn had spent a lot of time in Leith writing a story about the opening of the Scottish Parliament so he suggested the port district as the setting as he believed it shared similarities to Glasgow.

The BBC loved the idea and asked for Greenhorn to begin work on writing a new drama. It took six months for Greenhorn to write a 50 to 60-page 'document' about the new soap. The soap was to be set in Leith and titled The Shore, and although the BBC were impressed, they thought the right setting for the show was to be in the west of Scotland, essentially in Glasgow. This set Greenhorn back as he had already begun developing characters and producing storylines, but they didn't fit into the social classes and lifestyle of the city. Before he could rewrite his proposals, Greenhorn had to decide where in Glasgow the soap would be set. In the end, he settled for Whiteinch, on the north banks of the River Clyde.

His original commission for the soap only covered the first three episodes, however, Greenhorn planned to stick around to help contribute to what he hoped would become a Scottish household soap opera.

He also wanted to stick around to help the soap become a "drama factory" to open doors to actors, writers and crews to get into the television industry. BBC Scotland began building a purpose-built backlot, studio facility and office accommodation on an old whisky and vodka bottling plant in Dumbarton. This would be the setting for the show and helped for the BBC to build Shieldinch from scratch.

The soap's title, The Shore, was dropped by the BBC and Greenhorn suggested simply calling it Shieldinch, but this was rejected. In a brainstorming session, the final decision was "River City People", although this was later shortened to "River City". The BBC kept the name of the new soap opera a secret until its inception, simply referring it to as "The Scottish soap". The first episode aired on Tuesday 24 September 2002 on BBC One Scotland, and over 700,000 viewers tuned into the first episode of River City. However, the show was branded "River Shitty" in its early days.

In November 2017, a short crossover episode of the show was made for Children in Need and featured several of the show's characters meeting characters from Scottish sitcom Scot Squad.

In March 2020, production of River City was halted due to the COVID-19 pandemic, and filming recommenced in August 2020.

In place of new episodes, a select number of "classic" episodes were aired which BBC Scotland called "River City Rewind".

From October 2023, River City began a multi-series format. The soap aired as three distinct series a year with breaks of six weeks in between. Each series ran for 11 weeks, twice-weekly.

In March 2025, BBC Scotland announced that the series would broadcast its final episodes in September 2026. The press release cited the reason for the decision as "a significant change in audience behaviour away from long-running series", although there had been prior reports of it being host to a toxic work environment. Filming ended on 24 April 2026 with the final episode being broadcast on 31 August 2026.

== Setting ==
River City was set in Shieldinch, a fictional district in the west end of Glasgow, the largest city in Scotland. Shieldinch was founded in 1860 and was known for its shipyard (the local pub is named "The Tall Ship", which was a tribute to the area's shipbuilding heritage). The name was derived from the real districts of Whiteinch and Shieldhall, located on opposite banks of the River Clyde. Filming took place on a set built specifically for the soap opera in the nearby town of Dumbarton. The permanent set was based at the former Dumbarton Studios property, and was demolished and cleared in July 2026.

== Awards and nominations ==
Year	Award	Category	Nominee	Result	Ref
2006	BAFTA Scotland Award	Best Drama Programme	River City	Nominated	
2006	BAFTA Scotland Award	Audience Award	River City	Nominated	
2006	Great Scot Award	Entertainment Award	River City	Won	
2009	BAFTA Scotland Award	Television Drama	River City	Nominated	
2009	Scotland Variety Award	Best New Scottish Actor or Actress	Lisa Gardner (Jo Rossi)	Nominated	
2010	Scotland Variety Award	Best New Scottish Actor or Actress	Lorna Craig (Jennifer Bowie)	Won	
2010	New Talent Award	Acting Performance	Keira Lucchesi (Stella Walker)	Nominated	
2011	New Talent Award	Producer: Fiction/Factual	Lizzie Gray	Nominated	
2012	Scotland Variety Award	Best New Scottish Actor or Actress	Kiera Lucchesi (Stella Walker)	Nominated	
2020	BAFTA Scotland Award	Audience Award (Note: The Audience Award was specifically for Most Popular Television Programme)	River City	Nominated	
2023	RTS Scotland Award	Drama	River City	Won	
