= Arts University Bournemouth =

English art and media university

- Former names: Arts University College at Bournemouth (AUCB), Arts Institute at Bournemouth (AIB), Bournemouth and Poole College of Art and Design
- Type: Public
- Established: 1880; 146 years ago
- Budget: £4,159,000 (2013–2014)
- Chairman: Dorothy MacKenzie
- Vice-Chancellor: Lisa Mann
- Academic staff: 380 (2013–2014)
- Administrative staff: 165 (2013–2014)
- Students: 3,740 (2024/25)
- Undergraduates: 3,395 (2024/25)
- Postgraduates: 345 (2024/25)
- Location: Poole, England, UK; 50°44′29.2″N 1°53′52.1″W
- Campus: Wallisdown Campus
- Website: aub.ac.uk

Arts University Bournemouth (abbreviated AUB) is a public university in Poole, England, specialising in art, architecture, film, performance, and design. Established in 1880, the university has been ranked Silver and Gold by the Teaching Excellence Framework in 2017, and was rated Outstanding by Ofsted, having retained this highest ranking since 2018. The Bournemouth Film School, a division of the university, was established in 1963 and is a full member of CILECT.

AUB alumni include BAFTA and Academy Award winning filmmakers, and a Turner Prize recipient.

== History ==
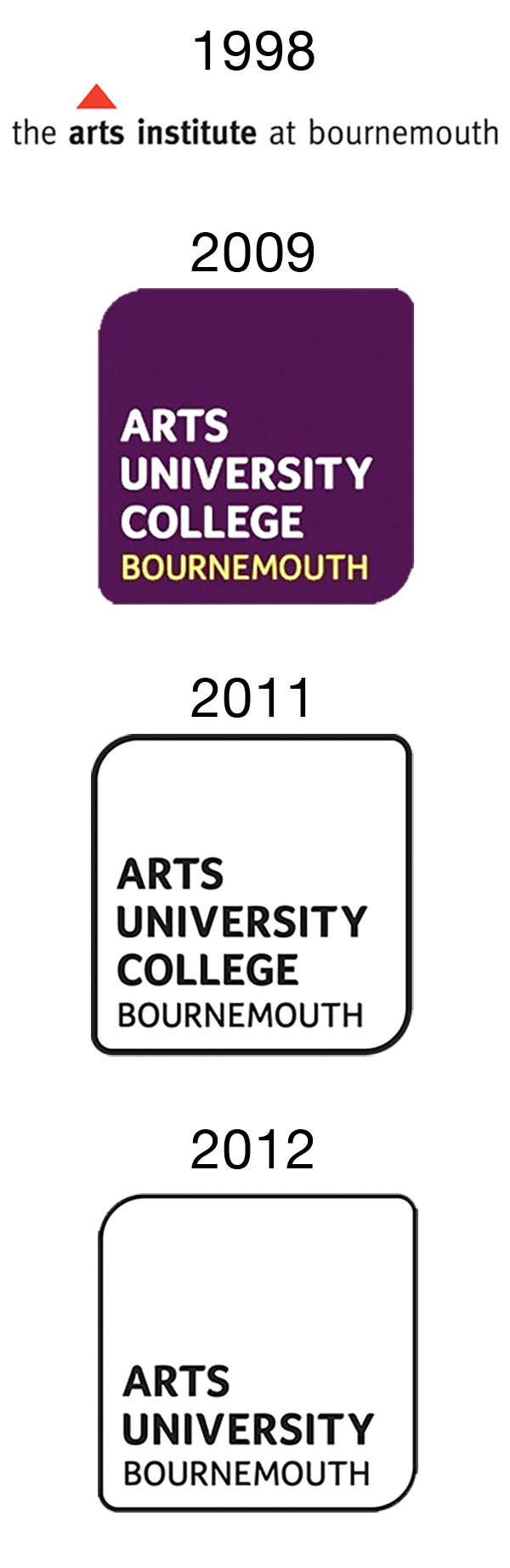

The first art school in Bournemouth was the Bournemouth Government School of Art, established in 1880. There was a considerable demand in Bournemouth at that time for instruction in Art and the numbers in the art school soon rose to 180. In 1884, the school became a Science and Art school. In 1885, the Bournemouth School of Science and Art moved to 1 Regent's Terrace, in Old Christchurch Road, where it remained until 1890.

When the Bournemouth School of Science and Art was forced to close due to a decrease in numbers and loss of grant in 1890–91, the majority of its students were transferred to the Bournemouth West School of Science and Art.

In 1913, the two Science and Art Schools at Bournemouth East and Bournemouth West were incorporated into the Bournemouth and Poole College of Art and Design along with the Technical and Commercial Schools. All art subjects then came under the umbrella of the School of Art within the Bournemouth Municipal College.

In 1964, Bournemouth and Poole College of Art was formed through the merger of Bournemouth Municipal College of Art and Poole College of Art. The name was changed to Bournemouth and Poole College of Art and Design in 1979. The first new building on the present campus was opened in 1984 and built at a cost of £2.3 million.

In 1998, the name was changed to The Arts Institute at Bournemouth (AIB) and won a Queen's Anniversary Prize for "Education in the film industry". In 2001, the AIB became a higher education institution.

In 2009, the Arts Institute Bournemouth changed its name to the Arts University College at Bournemouth following the acquisition of taught degree awarding powers in 2008.

In June 2012, Arts University College at Bournemouth satisfied the government's criteria for full university title and officially became Arts University Bournemouth (AUB) following approval from the Privy Council on 13 December 2012.

== Bournemouth Film School ==
Bournemouth Film School (BFS) has 1,500 students. The School was established in 1963 as part of a Cine pathway within the Bournemouth and Poole College of Art and Design by Reginald Johnson. The Bournemouth Film School is a registered trademark owned by the Arts University Bournemouth.

In 2016 Bournemouth Film School (BFS) celebrated over 50 years of excellence. and is a full member of CILECT. In 2017 BFS won a second Queen's Anniversary Prize for 'distinguished degree-level education in costume design for the UK's leading creative industries.'

In 2021 AUB purchased the Palace Court Theatre, a 1930s art deco theatre with 550 seats in the centre of Bournemouth town. Regular productions, events and screenings of work by BFS students are held along with community and professional events.

In 2022, BFS unveiled 'Funding Futures', a platform of rolling funding schemes and training opportunities for filmmakers, creatives, artists and innovators. Central to Funding Futures is the Alumni Film Fund, which creates live, professional projects, with AUB students taking on roles working with Alumni and industry professionals.

In 2023, BFS Funding Futures began a collaboration with BFI Network Southwest that led in 2024 to a partnership on a first-of-its-kind Director Talent Hub and micro short film commission. The films, produced by BFS staff and students at its AUB Elliott Road Film Studios, are attached to regional Directors selected by BFI Talent Executives.

In 2026, AUB received £1.25 million of capital funding from the Office for Students (OfS) to help the delivery of courses that will increase opportunities for students and support national growth, the regional economy and local employers. AUB was one of 60 universities across England to receive funding from OfS.

BFS is made up of:

- BA (Hons) Acting
- BA (Hons) Acting for Screen
- BA (Hons) Animation Production
- BA (Hons) Costume
- BA (Hons) Costume for Film
- BA (Hons) Creative Writing
- BA (Hons) Creative Writing for Film
- BA (Hons) Dance (Screen and Performance)
- BA (Hons) Film Production
- BA (Hons) Games Art and Design
- BA (Hons) Makeup, Hair and Prosthetics
- BA (Hons) Makeup, Hair and Prosthetics for Film

== Campus ==
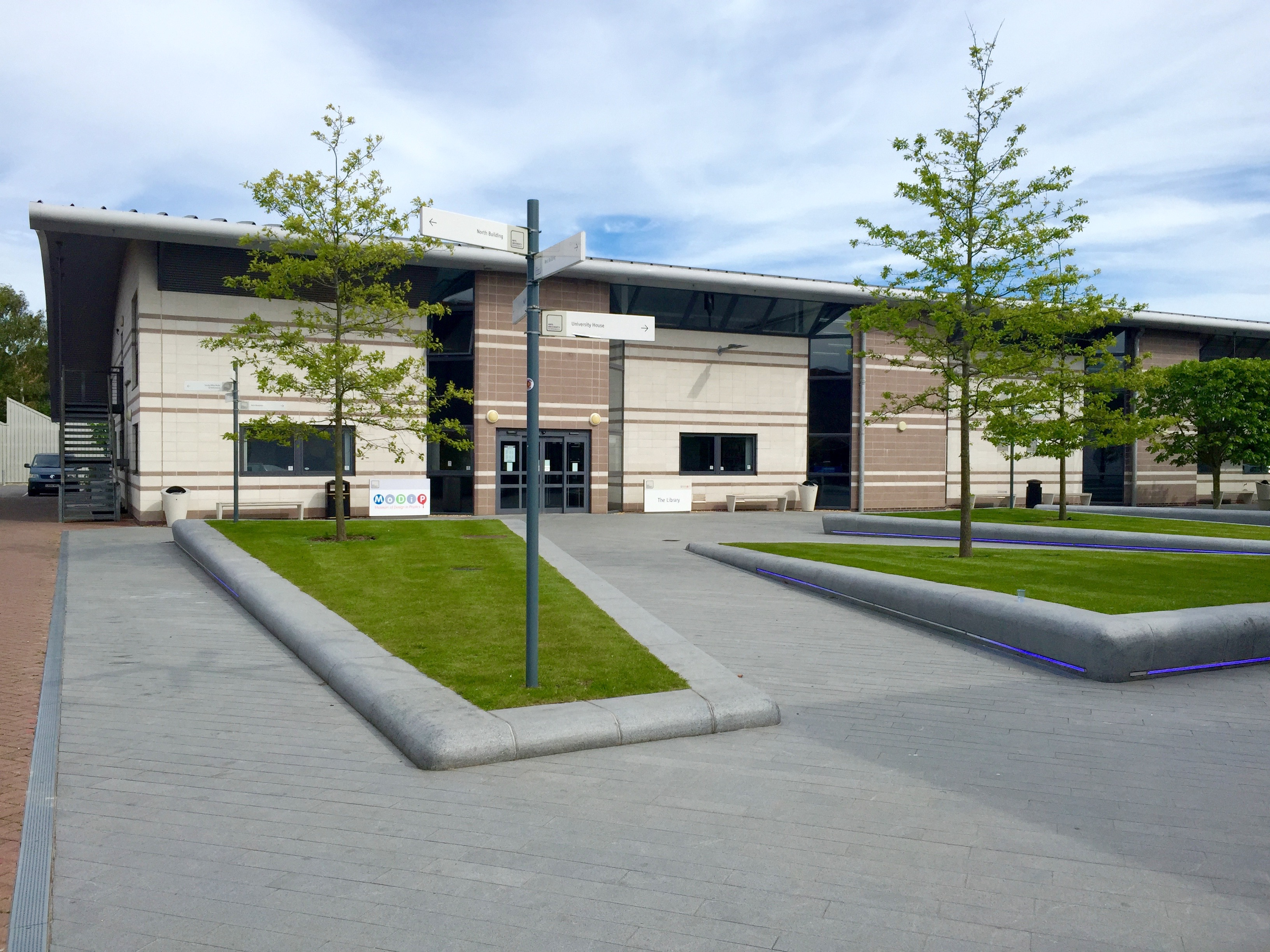
Centre of campus, the library & MoDiP

The Campus at Wallisdown in Poole covers roughly 5 hectares and houses 14 buildings with specialist workshops and workspaces, many of which are shared across similar courses. The campus sits within an area designated by the Talbot Village Trust as an innovation quarter.

In addition to the campus, students have access to Pavilion Dance South West, Palace Court Theatre and Elliot Road Film Studios. In 2023 the university opened AUBMakers, a pop-up shop in Poole Town centre as a student-led outlet for sales of work.

Notable facilities include:

- The CRAB Drawing Studio, a building designed by the Cook-Robotham Architectural Bureau led by Sir Peter Cook, which was shortlisted for the 2016 RIBA South West Awards. Opened by Zaha Hadid, it is the first purpose-built drawing studio to be designed and built in the UK for 100 years, emphasising natural light and featuring a large circular north-light and a rear clerestory, which provides softer light.
- The Innovation Studio is a building designed by the Cook-Robotham Architectural Bureau as a base for small business start-ups, R&D activities, and a home for the university enterprise activities. Resident businesses are assisted by leading experts who work at the university and from a network of ambassadors and supporters in the wider industry. The Studio was opened by Odile Decq in October 2021 as part of an architectural jamboree featuring AUB alumni and internationally recognised architects, and shared as a two-day livestream event.
- The Library – Over 50,000 books available covering a range of art, design, media, and performance subjects.
- Museum of Design in Plastics (MoDiP) – The only accredited museum in the UK with a focus on plastics, MoDiP is located inside the AUB library. As of 2021, the collection catalog listed over 10,000 objects.
- TheGallery – A gallery open to the public displaying both national and international touring exhibitions and work from alumni, staff, and students. The Gallery holds offsite exhibitions, pop-up events and other activities linked to the taught courses, and works closely with the AUB Student's Union in harnessing and displaying student creativity.
- North Building Extension – A building mainly for photography courses offering flexible teaching spaces, IT suites, and a lecture theatre, which was shortlisted for the 2016 RIBA South West Awards. It was designed by Design Engine Architects Ltd.
- The Student Services Building, which also houses the Students' Union, and facilities management. This building was also shortlisted for the 2016 RIBA South West Awards.
- The Refectory – Was a semi-finalist in the Bournemouth and Poole Tourism Awards 2018 "Breakfast of the Year" category

== Sustainability and environment ==
AUB has pledged to be net zero by 2030 and is a signatory of the EAUC Race to Zero. The Sustainability and Net Zero (SNZ) programme of works (2021) is designed to meet the university signatory to the net zero pledge.

In 2024 the university installed air source heat pumps (ASHPs) replacing gas boilers that serve North Building and the library and future-proofed the North Light Studios development. The ASHPs (for North Building project) are designed to provide approximately over a third of the universities' heat energy and reduce its reliance on fossil fuels.

In 2019, the university was awarded EcoCampus Platinum.

In 2024 AUB ranked in the top 50 of all UK higher education institutions in the People and Planet university league table. The university has consistently ranked highly in other environment and sustainability tables, such as The People & Planet Green League table.

AUB explores ways to be connected to nature and increase biodiversity on campus through ecological surveys; wildlife camera's; bat, birds, and insect homes; no mow May; and the planting of trees and other flora.

== Academic organisation and governance ==
The vice-chancellor and Chief Executive Officer, with the Senior Leadership Team (SLT), is responsible for the executive management of the university, supported by a number of executive committees. The academic board is the university's principal academic authority. AUB is governed by its board of governors. Subject to the responsibilities of the board of governors and the vice-chancellor and chief executive officer, the academic board has oversight of academic activities. In 2025 Lisa Mann was appointed as Vice Chancellor and Chief Executive Officer. Before that in 2019, Paul Gough was appointed principal and vice chancellor of the university, following the retirement of Stuart Bartholomew, who had served as principal and vice chancellor at the institution since 1997.

Arts University Bournemouth is currently divided into the following schools:

- School of Art, Design and Architecture
- Bournemouth Film School
- Fashion and Creative Industries Management

Under the auspices of AUB Academy, the university has a large pre-degree course Foundation in Art and Design (Ofsted rated 'Outstanding') and an expansive portfolio of short courses, evening classes, and summer schools. Seven postgraduate courses are delivered entirely online; the first degree apprenticeship course in Model Making with an internationally-recognised architectural practice has been validated for commencement in early 2025.

The university also validates courses in various art-related subjects for Bournemouth and Poole College and The Northern School of Art.

During 2024 validation agreements have also been established with City and Guild London Art School London and ThinkSpace education. In 2024 AUB also founded a validated, transnational education agreement with British University Vietnam. In 2026 AUB became a franchised partner and awarding body for two courses at JCA London Fashion Academy, founded by luxury shoe designer, Jimmy Choo. AUB also became the awarding body for two courses at the Manchester-based UK Management College (UKMC).

Arts University Bournemouth is a member of GuildHE, one of the two recognised representative bodies for Higher Education in the UK. In 2020 Paul Gough was elected chair of UKADIA one of the sector representative groups under the umbrella of GuildHE.

== Research and Knowledge Exchange ==
AUB has four research groupings: Drawing: Transformative Matter, Material Trace; CRUX photography research; Animation and Moving Image; Creative Technologies.

In the Research Excellence Framework (REF) 2021, 16% of outputs in UOA 32 Art and Design: History, Theory and Practice and 25% of outputs in UOA 33: Music, Drama, Dance, Performing Arts, Film and Screen Studies were ranked 'world leading'. The university's impact case studies scored 83% in UOA 32 and 50% in UOA 33 as internationally excellent. AUB saw a 200% increase in its QR funding as result of REF 2021.

In March 2024 AUB was awarded a £1.6 million E3 grant from Research England to create a new Research Centre: Plastics Innovation and Curation, which will explore how plastics degrade over time or behave in different environments, resulting in research that will have international relevance to both museum collections and modern manufacturing.

== Rankings ==
Rankings
National rankings
- Complete (2027): 93=
- Guardian (2027): 66
- Times / Sunday Times (2027): 110=

Arts University Bournemouth has a distinct record of recognition as a higher education institution, since being ranked as a No.1 Creative University in the Which? University 2012 survey. It was listed again in the top five and has since been recognised in other education league tables In 2023 AUB provision in Foundation in Art and Design was rated Outstanding by Ofsted, having retained this highest ranking since 2018. Since the inception of the 2017 Teaching Excellence Framework, a government assessment of the quality of undergraduate teaching in universities in England, the university has been ranked Silver and Gold in both national frameworks.

In 2016 Arts University Bournemouth was the first university or college of art to receive The Sir Misha Black Award, created in 1999 to honour the exceptional work of a teacher, team, department, or course within or between educational establishments in the UK.

In September 2024 AUB was awarded the Inclusive Employers Standard (IES) Silver award. The IES is an evidence-based inclusion accreditation run to help understand how inclusive the UK workforce is. AUB is the only UK university to be awarded at this level.

In September 2024, the Nonsensical Agency, which designs social media campaigns for companies such as M&S, Interflora, and Uber Eats, ranked Arts University Bournemouth (AUB) 29th out of UK universities for its TikTok channel. Features on the channel include videos of an on-campus petting zoo and content such as a video with 1 million views showing the Vice-Chancellor reacting to a theory that he is the artist Banksy.

== Student life ==
=== Students' Union ===
All students of the Arts University Bournemouth are automatically a member of the Arts University Bournemouth Students' Union (AUBSU), a registered charity affiliated with the National Union of Students. AUBSU runs over 30 clubs and societies, organises Freshers' Weeks, volunteering and fundraising events, trains course representatives, and hosts annual general meetings for all students. Each year, elections are held for both sabbatical (president, vice-president) and all volunteer (e.g. Events Officer, Communications Officer and Equality and Diversity Officer) posts.

AUBSU publishes a free, student-led magazine called BUMF. It is published termly and includes content from university course programmes, music, poetry, and writing.

=== Student housing ===
The university maintains four off-campus student halls throughout the town. Places are allocated with a priority to students living further away from Bournemouth and to students with disabilities/medical conditions. The university hosts two accommodation days before the beginning of each academic year, so prospective students can independently form house-sharing groups and view private rented accommodation.

The three main halls of residence are:

- Madeira Road – Built in 2014 with 378 beds, located in the town centre of Bournemouth
- Home Park – Located in the Lansdowne area of Bournemouth, the Home Park offers ensuite rooms and studios to first year students.
- Campus Halls – Three on-campus block are being built to house 300 students.

In their second and third years, many students live in nearby suburbs of Bournemouth: typically Winton, Charminster or Boscombe, where they can live in independently owned residences.

== Notable alumni ==
- Simon Beaufoy, screenwriter of Slumdog Millionnaire, 127 Hours and The Full Monty (Bournemouth Film School)
- Paul Campion, visual effects on Clash of the Titans and X-Men: The Last Stand
- Joe Cornish, writer/director of Attack the Block, and writer of The Adventures of Tintin: The Secret of the Unicorn
- Chris Dickens, editor of Slumdog Millionaire, Paul and Submarine
- Bille Eltringham, director of This Is Not a Love Song and Ashes to Ashes (Bournemouth Film School)
- Jonathan English, producer of Shoot 'Em Up, writer/director of Ironclad, and director of Minotaur
- Evelyn Hoskins, actress, Lucy in E4 comedy drama Misfits and Dawn in Waitress (UK & Ireland Tour and West End)
- Oliver Irving, writer/director of How to Be (Bournemouth Film School)
- Chris Jones, director of White Angel and Gone Fishing, and writer of The Guerilla Filmmakers Handbook
- Yvonne Grundy, actress, the voice of Nia in Thomas & Friends
- Nick Knight, fashion photographer (Photography, Bournemouth & Poole College of Art and Design, 1982)
- Suri Krishnamma, director of A Man of No Importance (Arts Institute at Bournemouth)
- Nick Love, writer/director/producer of The Football Factory, Outlaw and The Business
- Duncan Roy, director of AKA and Method (Film, Bournemouth and Poole College)
- Sam Smith, toy-maker
- Sara Sugarman, director of Confessions of a Teenage Drama Queen and Waking the Dead (Film & Television, Bournemouth Film School)
- Katrina Tang, photographer and videographer, Nominated by PDN as 30 most notable photographers to watch in 2015
- Wolfgang Tillmans, photographer, Turner Prize winner (Bournemouth and Poole College of Art and Design, 1990–92)
- Tony Weare, comics artist best known for the Matt Marriott western strip in The Evening News and Illustration for V for Vendetta (Bournemouth School of Art)
- Edgar Wright, director of Scott Pilgrim vs. the World, Shaun of the Dead, and Hot Fuzz (Audio-Visual Design, Bournemouth and Poole College of Art, 1992–94)

=== Honorary Fellows ===
- Jenny Beavan
- Darcey Bussell
- Margaret Calvert
- Peter Cook (architect)
- Mike Davies (architect)
- Roger Dean (artist)
- Nick Dudman
- Caryn Franklin
- Darren Henley
- Suri Krishnamma
- Peter Lord
- Martin Roth (museum director)
- Helen Storey
- Wolfgang Tillmans
- Dame Vivienne Westwood
- Edgar Wright

== See also ==
- Armorial of UK universities
- List of art universities and colleges in Europe
- List of universities in the UK
- Visual arts education
