= Alan C. McLaughlin =

Scottish cinematographer

- Born: Aberdeen, Scotland
- Occupation: Cinematographer
- Years active: 2011–present
- Notable work: Ink; Difret; Lost Serenity; Outpost 2: Black Sun; Isolani
- Website: www.acmdop.com

Alan C McLaughlin (also known as Alan McLaughlin) is a Scottish Director of Photography. He is perhaps best known for his work on the film Lost Serenity which earned him the Best Director of Photography accolade at the 2013 British Academy Scotland New Talent Awards.

== Filmography ==
Year	Film	Role	Director	Notes
2017	Cotton Wool	Director of Photography	Nicholas Connor	Starring Leanne Best | Max Vento | Crissy Rock
2011	Outpost 2: Black Sun	Director of Photography (Additional Photography)	Steve Barker	Successful Multimillion-dollar feature by Black Camel Pictures
2011	Closure (Short)	Director of Photography	Ben Sharrock	Nominated for Best Cinematography at the 2012; British Student Film Festival
2012	Lost Serenity (Short)	Director of Photography	Ben Sharrock	Winner of two British Academy Scotland New Talent Awards (Director of Photography and Sound Design)
2012	Outpost 3: Rise of the Spetsnaz	Director of Photography - 2nd Unit	Kieran Parker	Multimillion-dollar feature by Black Camel Pictures
2012	Difret	A-Camera Operator and B-Unit	Zeresenay Mehari	Executive Producer Angelina Jolie presents multi-award winning Ethiopian feature.
2013	La Chasse (Short)	Director of Photography	Gordon Napier	Starring James Anthony Pearson and Gary Lewis
2013	Hole (Short)	Director of Photography	Mike Callaghan	Starring James Cosmo, Daniela Nardini, and Stephen McCole
2013	My Silent World	Director of Photography	Luke Aherne	Choreographed by Mark Smith.
2014	Tide (Short)	Director of Photography	Gordon Napier	Starring Gary Lewis
2014	Ink (Short)	Director of Photography	Andy Stewart	Starring Sammy Hayman
2014	All The Ordinary Angels	Director of Photography	Simon Lovell	Shot on location in Liverpool for the BYFA
2015	Dracula	Director of Photography	James Black	Pre-production

== Awards and nominations ==
Year	Nominated Work	Awards	Category	Result
2013	Lost Serenity	British Academy Scotland New Talent Awards	Best Director of Photography	Won
