= Nicholas Connor =

English filmmaker

- Born: Oldham, England
- Occupation(s): Film director, writer
- Years active: 2012–present
- Notable work: Cotton Wool; Northern Lights; Think of Me

Nicholas Connor is an English filmmaker. Best known for his work on the film Cotton Wool. In 2017 he was awarded the 'Ones to Watch' Award by Into Film at the Odeon Leicester Square. Presented by actor Charles Dance, sponsored by EON Productions. Connor presently lives in Oldham, England.

== Career ==
Nicholas Connor started his career as a script supervisor and then attended the BFI Film Academy at HOME in Manchester.

In 2016 he directed Northern Lights, which received a mixed critical response. Chris Olson from UK Film Review gave the film 4 stars calling it "a beautiful piece of filmmaking". Jennie Kermode for 'Eye for Film' gave the film 3 stars, stating "Northern Lights may sometimes by lacking in energy but it doesn't outstay its welcome and overall it's an impressive debut."

In 2017, aged 17, he directed Cotton Wool with a cast including Leanne Best and Crissy Rock. The film was shot by BAFTA winning cinematographer Alan C. McLaughlin. The film was supported in its research by the British Stroke Association and received a 12A by the British Board of Film Classification. The film received a 5 star review from ScreenCritix, which stated "he is really coming into his own and certainly cementing his status as one of the UK’s hottest prospects." The film's red carpet premiere took place in Oldham, England.

In December 2017 he featured on BBC News to talk about his career. He won the UK Inspirational Children and Young Peoples Award for Arts and Culture in 2018.

In 2024, it was announced that he would be directing an adaption of the play "Maurice's Jubilee", starring Julian Glover, Susan Hampshire and Nichola McAuliffe.

== Filmography ==
Year	Film	Role	Director	Notes
2024	Eventual	Director	Nicholas Connor	
2018	The Narrator	Director	Nicholas Connor	
2017	Cotton Wool	Writer/Director	Nicholas Connor	Starring Leanne Best | Max Vento | Kate Rutter | Katie Quinn | Crissy Rock
2016	Northern Lights	Writer/Director/Producer	Nicholas Connor	Starring Rhys Cadman | Katie Quinn | Megan Grady |
2015	Think of Me	Writer/Director	Nicholas Connor	
2015	Going out	Writer/Director	Nicholas Connor	

== Awards and nominations ==
Year	Nominated Work	Awards	Category	Result
2018	Himself	UK Inspirational Children and Young Peoples Award	Contribution to Arts and Culture	Won
2018	Cotton Wool	London Film Awards	Special Jury Award	Won
2019	Cotton Wool	Los Angeles Film Awards	Best Picture	Won
2019	Cotton Wool	Los Angeles Film Awards	Best Drama	Won
2019	Cotton Wool	Los Angeles Film Awards	Best of the Festival 2019	Nominated
2018	Cotton Wool	British Independent Film Festival	Best Short Film	Nominated
2018	Cotton Wool	UK Film Review - Annual Awards	Best Short Film of the Year	Won
2018	Cotton Wool	UK Film Review - Annual Awards	Best Director	Nominated
2018	Cotton Wool	European Independent Film Awards	Best Director	Won
2018	Cotton Wool	European Independent Film Awards	Best Drama	Won
2018	Cotton Wool	Global Independent Film Awards	Best Drama	Won
2018	Cotton Wool	Global Independent Film Awards	Best Featurette	Won
2020	Cotton Wool	Indie Shorts Mag - Short of the Year Awards	Best Short of the Year	Won
2019	Cotton Wool	Lift-Off Season Awards 2019	Best Director	Nominated
2019	Cotton Wool	New York Film Awards	Best Picture	Won
2019	Cotton Wool	New York Film Awards	Best Young Filmmaker	Won
2019	Cotton Wool	New York Film Awards	Best Editing	Won
2019	Cotton Wool	New York Film Awards	Best Director	Won
2019	Cotton Wool	New York Film Awards	Jury President Award	Won
2019	Cotton Wool	New York Film Awards	Best Narrative Feature	Won
2019	Cotton Wool	New York Film Awards	Best of the Festival 2019	Nominated
2019	Cotton Wool	New York Film Awards	Best Editing of 2019	Won
2018	Cotton Wool	Birmingham Film Festival	Best Young Director	Nominated
2018	Cotton Wool	Manchester Lift-Off Film Festival	Special Mention	Won
2018	Cotton Wool	Southampton International Film Festival	Best British Short Film	Nominated
2018	Cotton Wool	Southampton International Film Festival	Best Director	Nominated
2018	Cotton Wool	New Renaissance Film Festival	Humanity Award	Won
2018	Cotton Wool	New Renaissance Film Festival	Best Young Talent Short Narrative	Nominated
2018	Cotton Wool	Gold Movie Awards	Best Film of the Year	Nominated
2018	Cotton Wool	Gold Movie Awards	Best Featurette - Annual Award	Won
2018	Cotton Wool	Gold Movie Awards	Film of the Month	Won
2018	Cotton Wool	Gold Movie Awards	Best Featurette - Monthly Award	Won
2019	Cotton Wool	The Monthly Film Festival	Best Short Film	Won
2019	Cotton Wool	The Monthly Film Festival	Best Director	Nominated
2019	Cotton Wool	The Monthly Film Festival	Best Screenplay	Nominated
2019	Cotton Wool	The Monthly Film Festival	Best Editing	Nominated
2019	Cotton Wool	Madrid Independent Film Festival	Best Featurette	Nominated
2018	Cotton Wool	Out of the Can Film Festival	Best Drama	Won
2018	Cotton Wool	Out of the Can Film Festival	Judge's Choice Award	Won
2018	Cotton Wool	Out of the Can Film Festival	Best Screenplay	Nominated
2018	Cotton Wool	Out of the Can Film Festival	Best Lifestyle Project, Sponsored by Hellblazerbiz	Nominated
2018	Cotton Wool	IndieFlicks Short Film Festival	Director's Choice Award	Won
2018	Cotton Wool	Little Wing Film Festival	Best UK Short	Nominated
2018	Cotton Wool	Little Wing Film Festival	Best Director	Won
2018	Cotton Wool	Little Wing Film Festival	Best Screenplay	Nominated
2018	Cotton Wool	Unrestricted View Film Festival	Best Director	Nominated
2018	Cotton Wool	Unrestricted View Film Festival	Best Screenplay	Nominated
2018	Cotton Wool	Unrestricted View Film Festival	Best Short Film	Nominated
2018	The Narrator	Carmarthen Bay Film Festival (BAFTA Cyrmru Qualifying)	Rising Star Award	Won
2018	The Narrator	St Albans Film Festival	Best Short Film	Nominated
2018	The Narrator	Bolton Film Festival	Best UK Student Film	Won
2018	The Narrator	Out of the Can Film Festival	Ento Live Young Filmmaker Award 2018	Won
2017	Himself	Into Film Awards	Ones to Watch Award (Presented by Charles Dance and Barbara Broccoli)	Won
2017	Northern Lights	UK Monthly Film Festival	Film of the Year	Won
2016	Northern Lights	UK Monthly Film Festival	Best Feature Film	Won
2016	Northern Lights	TMC London Film Festival	Best Young Filmmaker	Won
2016	Northern Lights	Ouchy Film Awards	Best Director	Nominated
2016	Northern Lights	The Monkey Bread Tree Awards	Best Feature Film	Won
2016	Northern Lights	The Monkey Bread Tree Awards	Best Director	Nominated
2016	Think of Me	Into Film Awards	Film of the Month	Won
2016	Think of Me	Leeds Young Film Festival	Independent Directions Award	Nominated
2016	Think of Me	Selby International Film Festival	Best Short Film	Nominated
2016	Think of Me	HOME (Manchester) Filmed up Festival	Audience Award (Best Short Film)	Won

== Festivals Accolations ==
Film Festival	Film	Notes
Manchester Film Festival	Eventual	Official Selection
Carmarthen Bay Film Festival	Eventual	Official Selection
St Albans Film Festival	The Narrator	Official Selection
Liverpool Short Film Festival	The Narrator	Official Selection
Carmarthen Bay Film Festival	The Narrator	Official Selection
Bucharest ShortCut Cinefest	The Narrator	Official Selection
Earl's Court Film Festival	The Narrator	Official Selection
Out Of The Can Film Festival	The Narrator	Official Selection
Sheffield Showroom Shorts	The Narrator	Official Selection
Bolton International Film Festival	The Narrator	Official Selection
Portobello Film Festival	The Narrator	Official Selection
Harrogate Film Festival	The Narrator	Official Selection
UK CineFest	The Narrator	Official Selection
BFI Future Film Presents Scene Film Festival	The Narrator	Official Selection
Leigh Short Film Festival	The Narrator	Official Selection
London International Motion Picture Awards (L.I.M.P.A)	The Narrator	Official Selection
Manchester Lift-Off Film Festival	The Narrator	Official Selection
London-Worldwide Comedy Short Film Festival	The Narrator	Honourable Mention
Cleveland International Film Festival	Cotton Wool	Hot List
British Independent Film Festival	Cotton Wool	Official Selection
Los Angeles Lift-Off Film Festival	Cotton Wool	Official Selection
New Renaissance Film Festival (London)	Cotton Wool	Official Selection
Newark International Film Festival	Cotton Wool	Official Selection
European Independent Film Awards	Cotton Wool	Official Selection
Los Angeles Film Awards	Cotton Wool	Official Selection
Derby Film Festival	Cotton Wool	Official Selection
Southampton International Film Festival	Cotton Wool	Official Selection
Unrestricted View Film Festival	Cotton Wool	Official Selection
New York Film Awards	Cotton Wool	Official Selection
Indie Shorts Mag - Short of the Year Awards	Cotton Wool	Official Selection
Little Wing Film Festival	Cotton Wool	Official Selection
London International Motion Picture Awards (L.I.M.P.A)	Cotton Wool	Official Selection
Birmingham Film Festival	Cotton Wool	Official Selection
Newcastle International Film Festival	Cotton Wool	Official Selection
Bristol Independent Film Festival	Cotton Wool	Official Selection
Global Independent Film Awards	Cotton Wool	Official Selection
Scottish Mental Health Film Festival	Cotton Wool	Official Selection
Madrid Independent Film Festival	Cotton Wool	Official Selection
Manchester Lift-Off Film Festival	Cotton Wool	Official Selection
Manchester Screenplays and Shorts Film Festival	Cotton Wool	Official Selection
London Film Awards	Cotton Wool	Official Selection
Gold Movie Awards	Cotton Wool	Official Selection
IndieFlicks International Film Festival	Cotton Wool	Official Selection
MancMade 53Two Film Festival	Cotton Wool	Official Selection
The Monthly Film Festival (Glasgow)	Cotton Wool	Official Selection
UK Film Review - Annual Awards	Cotton Wool	Official Selection
Out Of The Can Film Festival	Cotton Wool	Official Selection
Scottish Mental Health Film Festival	Northern Lights	Official Selection
UK Monthly Film Festival	Northern Lights	Official Selection
TMC London Film Festival	Northern Lights	Official Selection
Manchester Lift-Off Film Festival	Northern Lights	Official Selection
The Monkey Bread Tree Awards	Northern Lights	Official Selection
Ouchy Film Awards	Northern Lights	Official Selection
UK Screen One International Film Festival	Northern Lights	Official Selection
Unrestricted View Film Festival	Northern Lights	Official Selection
London Film Awards	Northern Lights	Official Selection
Leeds Young Film Festival	Think of Me	Official Selection
Pennine Film Festival	Think of Me	Official Selection
Nightpiece Film Festival	Think of Me	Official Selection
HOME (Manchester) Filmed up Festival	Think of Me	Official Selection
Into Film of the Month	Think of Me	Official Selection
Selby International Film Festival	Think of Me	Official Selection

== Personal life ==
Connor grew up in his hometown of Oldham. His sister is LPGA golf professional 'Rachel Connor'.
