= Urban Ghost Story =

- Directed by: Geneviève Jolliffe
- Written by: Geneviève Jolliffe; Chris Jones
- Produced by: Chris Jones; Jagjit Singh Banwait; David Hardwick; Ian Hierons
- Starring: Jason Connery; Stephanie Buttle; Heather Ann Foster; Nicola Stapleton; Billy Boyd; James Cosmo; Elizabeth Berrington
- Cinematography: Jon Walker
- Edited by: Eddie Hamilton
- Music by: Rupert Gregson-Williams
- Production company: Living Spirit Pictures
- Release date: 1998
- Running time: 90 minutes
- Country: United Kingdom
- Language: English

Urban Ghost Story is a 1998 British horror film directed by Geneviève Jolliffe, written by Geneviève Jolliffe and Chris Jones, and starring Jason Connery, Nicola Stapleton, Billy Boyd, Stephanie Buttle, and Heather Ann Foster.

Praised for its mixture of creepy fabulism and kitchen sink realism, the film is set in a high-rise housing estate in Glasgow, Scotland.

== Plot ==
The plot follows 12-year-old Lizzie (Heather Ann Foster) who, after being involved in a road traffic accident and suffering a near-death experience, feels that she is haunted by a malicious spirit that she brought back with her from the afterlife. Although surrounded by people who disbelieve her claims, Lizzie and her mother eventually encounter a journalist who, although initially skeptical, comes to eventually believe the claims and with the assistance of a university parapsychologist the family start to deal with the events.

== Cast ==
- Jason Connery as John Fox
- Stephanie Buttle as Kate Fisher
- Heather Ann Foster as Lizzie Fisher
- Nicola Stapleton as Kerrie
- James Cosmo as Minister
- Elizabeth Berrington as Mrs. Ash
- Siri Neal as Social Worker (credited as Siri O'Neal)
- Andreas Wisniewski as Quinn
- Billy Boyd as Loan Shark
- Kenneth Bryans as Mr. Ash
- Carolyn Bonnyman as Mrs. Miller
- Alan Owen as Alex Fisher
- Stephen MacDonald as Coroner
- Julie Austin as Teacher
- Nicola Greene as WPC Tomkins

== Production ==
Following production of their previous film, White Angel, Geneviève Jolliffe and Chris Jones researched poltergeist activity including the Enfield poltergeist occurrences. They wrote their script throughout 1996.

The Living Spirit Pictures team moved into Ealing Film Studios in January of 1997 and officially moved into pre-production. Executive Producer David Hardwick came onboard. By August set building began on Stage 4 at Ealing, where most filming took place, with location shots done in Glasgow. Shooting began August 18th, 1997, and wrapped five weeks later. The music was composed by Rupert Gregson-Williams.

=== Casting ===
Living Spirit saw "many high profile actresses" for the role of Lizzie's mother Kate Fisher, and they knew Stephanie Buttle typified Kate in both appearance and performance. Buttle said that she loved the screenplay: "What appealed to me most was the fact that the characters seemed very real, enduring problems with which I could identify. It was also good to see a strong female presence in the film without it deteriorating into the clichés usually associated with strong female characters." John Fox, the tabloid journalist, was critical but hard to cast. After many interviews, Jason Connery (who had been suggested early on) was called. Geneviève Jolliffe said, "He was in LA with his new born son and we were in Ealing, we didn't think he would want to come back to the UK for a part that wasn't even the lead." Co-writer Chris Jones said, "When he walked through the door, we knew we had found our John Fox; he simply oozed the sex appeal and star qualities the character required."

James Cosmo, Nicola Stapleton, Andreas Wisniewski, and Elizabeth Berrington took other major roles; it also makes a film debut for Billy Boyd.

== Reception ==
The film was nominated for two British Independent Film Awards — the Douglas Hickox Award for Best Debut Director and the Best British Independent Film. It premiered at The Edinburgh Film Festival, won two Fantafestival awards for Best Actress and Best Film, Best Film at WorldFest Houston Film Festival and was selected to play at the Karlovy Vary International Film Festival and The Busan International Film Festival. Jolliffe was selected as one of the Ten to Watch series from Critics Choice - Europe Now by Variety.

Fangoria called it "one of the most authentically rendered '90s horror films about the poor, lower-class world which its cast of central characters inhabit. [...] Urban Ghost Story is an inescapably raw, gritty, low-budget affair, but to miss how consciously it draws a line between the unseen forces of the netherworld and the invisible hand of the bureaucracies and institutions who seem equally intent on destroying Lizzie's family denies the real power that indie filmmaking can have. Comparisons to Ken Loach and Mike Leigh might seem hyperbolic, but Joliffe and Urban Ghost Story ultimately don't need to be tethered to big name fancy pants male filmmakers to justify how good it is; this movie stands on its own, and is an extraordinary snapshot of how poverty, shame, guilt and isolation work together, all through the enduring supernatural metaphor of the ghost".

The Guardian described the film as "a ghost story told with conviction, some creepy atmospherics in the desolate tower block, and an interesting riff on the poltergeist as a manifestation of poverty and alienation". Michael Thomson from BBC Film Reviews gave a mixed, 3-out-of-5 stars review to the film: "Despite creating credible scares, a sense of poor folk being pounded by their circumstances, and an environment of fully-detailed grubbiness, the director relies on too much editing within scenes, so the film often moves too quickly from one face to another instead of moving fluently with unbroken shots. In this way, we are unhooked from a film which should really have grabbed and gripped".

Writing, "Ken Loach meets The Exorcist in the Glasgow-set Urban Ghost Story, a dank, often creepy and decidedly gritty spin on a familiar genre that packs several shocks of its own," Variety saw it as "a clever, often potent blend of British kitchen-sink drama with fantasy elements that gains added resonance by being set in gruff, rugged Glasgow."

What intrigued Richard Scheib, of Moria: Science Fiction, Horror, and Fantasy Film Review, is that "the film falls into a small sub-genre of supernatural films whose paranormal content hovers in a twilight zone of uncertainty between whether the manifestations can passed off with a rational/psychological explanation or are genuinely supernatural." Noting briefly the classics of this sort (Henry James's The Turn of the Screw and The Innocents, Val Lewton's Cat People, and The X-Files), Scheib writes, "Urban Ghost Story is notable among this genre of reason-vs-supernatural ghost stories of offering not just a single dichotomy between the paranormal and more mundane explanations but vying between an entire handful of potential explanations. Is the haunting caused by the spirit of the boy that was killed in an accident that daughter Lizzie was responsible in part for? Is it, as the exorcists believe, a demon that was brought back from beyond in the three minutes that Lizzie spent dead following the accident? Is it, as the parapsychologists believe, caused by leakage from an electrical conduit under the bedroom floor? Is it, as the tabloid reporter accuses, the manipulations of an attention-seeking daughter? Or is it, as child welfare accuses, hysteria drummed up by the tabloid reporter’s sensationalistic articles?" Schieb concludes that while each possibility is dealt with fairly, the movie's emotional resolution comes when Lizzie releases her guilt by confessing she drove the car in which the boy was killed, after which a better life is implied.
