= When I Grow Up =

When I Grow Up may refer to:

== Film and television ==
- "When I Grow Up...", an episode of Barney & Friends
- When I Grow Up (film), a 1951 film starring Bobby Driscoll
- When I Grow Up, a 2008 film by Michael Ferns

== Literature ==
- When I Grow Up (webcomic), a webcomic by Jeffrey Rowland
- When I Grow up: A Memoir, a 2008 book by Juliana Hatfield
- When I Grow Up, a 2011 children's book by "Weird Al" Yankovic

== Songs ==
- "When I Grow Up" (Fever Ray song), 2009
- "When I Grow Up" (Garbage song), 1999
- "When I Grow Up" (Matilda song), from Matilda the Musical, 2011
- "When I Grow Up" (NF song), 2019
- "When I Grow Up" (The Pussycat Dolls song), 2008
- "When I Grow Up (To Be a Man)", by the Beach Boys, 1964
- "When I Grow Up", by Clint Daniels, 1998
- "When I Grow Up", by Michelle Shocked from Short Sharp Shocked, 1988
