= Simone Smith =

Simone Smith may refer to:

- Simone Smith (British film editor), Scottish film director and film editor
- Simone Smith (Canadian film editor), Canadian film and television editor
- Simone Smith (rugby league) (born 1993), Australian rugby league player
