= Keira Lucchesi =

Scottish actress

- Born: Glasgow, Scotland
- Occupation: Actress
- Years active: 2009–present
- Notable work: River City; One Night in Sutherland Hill

Keira Lucchesi is a Scottish actress.

== Life and career ==
Lucchesi's first professional role began in 2009, playing the role of Stella Walker in the BBC soap opera River City. Some of the storylines relating to her character related to homelessness, a miscarriage and a recurring battle with alcoholism. In 2010, in recognition of her outstanding performance as Stella Walker, Lucchesi was nominated for Best Acting Performance at the 2010 British Academy Scotland New Talent Awards, and won a Young Scot Award in the Entertainment category in 2015.

In 2015, she starred in a revival of John Byrne's classic play The Slab Boys which was co directed by her boyfriend David Hayman Jr.

== Filmography ==
Year	Title	Director	Role	Notes
2023	Casualty	Christopher McGill	Kerry Morgan	TV series
2020	The Nest	Simen Alsvik	NICU Nurse Naomi	TV series
2017	Outlander	Norma Bailey	Dorcas	TV series
2009–16, 2022	River City	Various	Stella Walker	TV series
2012	One Night in Sutherland Hill	Michael Callaghan	Charlene	Short Film

== Awards and nominations ==
Year	Nominated Work	Awards	Category	Result
2010	River City	British Academy Scotland New Talent Awards	Best Acting Performance	Nominated
2015	River City	10th Young Scot Awards	Entertainment	Won
