= Cotton Wool =

2017 film directed by Nicholas Connor

- Directed by: Nicholas Connor
- Written by: Nicholas Connor
- Starring: Leanne Best; Max Vento; Katie Quinn; Kate Rutter; Crissy Rock; Gemma North
- Cinematography: Alan C. McLaughlin
- Production company: Cherwell Productions Ltd.
- Release date: 10 October 2017

Cotton Wool is a 2017 British drama film following the story of a 7-year-old boy (Max Vento) who cares for his mother (Leanne Best) after she has survived from a stroke, with little to no help from his older sister (Katie Quinn).

The film was assisted in its research by The Stroke Association.

== Cast ==
- Leanne Best as Rachel
- Max Vento as Sam
- Katie Quinn as Jennifer
- Kate Rutter as Marion
- Crissy Rock as Gerry
- Gemma North as Liz
- Megan Grady as Young Jennifer
- Jason Rickets as David

== Reception ==
The film received a 12A by the British Board of Film Classification. The film's critical reception was mixed, 'ScreenCritix' gave the film 5 stars stating "Best is a revelation", while the Mancunion criticised its short length "suffered in the rush to squeeze an 80-minute story into 40 minutes. 'UK Film Review' stated that the film was '‘Utterly enrapturing’ and ‘Affecting and heartbreaking’." At the 2017 London Film Awards, the film was awarded the 'Special Jury Award'. The film featured on BBC News, looking into the age of the director and his career, as well as the importance of supporting child carers. The films red carpet premiere took place in Oldham, Lancashire, England.

== Production ==
The film was shot on both digital and 35 mm film formats, using an Arriflex 435 and Red Epic. The film was shot by BAFTA winning cinematographer Alan C. McLaughlin. The production shot for 7 days in total in Barkisland, West Yorkshire.

== Festivals Accolations ==
Film Festival	Notes
Cleveland International Film Festival	Hot List
British Independent Film Festival	Official Selection
Los Angeles Lift-Off Film Festival	Official Selection
Global Independent Film Awards	Official Selection
Derby Film Festival	Official Selection
New York Film Awards	Official Selection
European Independent Film Awards	Official Selection
New Renaissance Film Festival (London)	Official Selection
Newark International Film Festival	Official Selection
Unrestricted View Film Festival	Official Selection
Manchester Lift-Off Film Festival	Official Selection
Newcastle International Film Festival	Official Selection
Scottish Mental Health Film Festival	Official Selection
Indie Shorts Mag - Short of the Year Awards	Official Selection
Manchester Screenplays and Shorts Film Festival	Official Selection
MancMade 53Two Film Festival	Official Selection
Out of the Can Film Festival	Official Selection
Southampton International Film Festival	Official Selection
Little Wing Film Festival	Official Selection
Los Angeles Film Awards	Official Selection
Bristol Independent Film Festival	Official Selection
London International Motion Picture Awards (L.I.M.P.A)	Official Selection
Birmingham Film Festival	Official Selection
UK Film Review - Annual Awards	Official Selection
IndieFlicks International Film Festival	Official Selection
The Monthly Film Festival (Glasgow)	Official Selection
Madrid Independent Film Festival	Official Selection
Gold Movie Awards	Official Selection
London Film Awards	Official Selection

== Awards and nominations ==
Year	Nominated Work	Awards	Category	Result
2018	Cotton Wool	London Film Awards	Special Jury Award	Won
2018	Cotton Wool	UK Film Review - Annual Awards	Best Short Film of 2018	Won
2018	Cotton Wool	UK Film Review - Annual Awards	Best Director	Nominated
2018	Cotton Wool	European Independent Film Awards	Best Drama	Won
2018	Cotton Wool	European Independent Film Awards	Best Director	Won
2018	Cotton Wool	European Independent Film Awards	Best Actress (Leanne Best)	Won
2018	Cotton Wool	Madrid Independent Film Festival	Best Featurette	Nominated
2018	Cotton Wool	Global Independent Film Awards	Best Drama	Won
2018	Cotton Wool	Global Independent Film Awards	Best Featurette	Won
2018	Cotton Wool	Global Independent Film Awards	Best Actor Under 18 (Max Vento)	Won
2018	Cotton Wool	Global Independent Film Awards	Best Actress Under 18 (Katie Quinn)	Won
2020	Cotton Wool	Indie Shorts Mag - Short of the Year Awards	Best Short of the Year	Won
2019	Cotton Wool	Lift-Off Season Awards 2019	Best Director	Nominated
2019	Cotton Wool	IndieFlicks Short Film Festival	Director's Choice Award	Won
2019	Cotton Wool	Los Angeles Film Awards	Best Picture	Won
2019	Cotton Wool	Los Angeles Film Awards	Best Actress (Leanne Best)	Won
2019	Cotton Wool	Los Angeles Film Awards	Best Supporting Actress (Crissy Rock)	Won
2019	Cotton Wool	Los Angeles Film Awards	Best Young Actress (Katie Quinn)	Won
2019	Cotton Wool	Los Angeles Film Awards	Best Drama	Won
2019	Cotton Wool	Los Angeles Film Awards (Annual Ceremony)	Best of the Festival 2019	Nominated
2019	Cotton Wool	Los Angeles Film Awards (Annual Ceremony)	Best Actress of 2019 (Leanne Best)	Nominated
2019	Cotton Wool	Los Angeles Film Awards (Annual Ceremony)	Best Ensemble of 2019	Won
2018	Cotton Wool	British Independent Film Festival	Best Short Film	Nominated
2018	Cotton Wool	British Independent Film Festival	Best Supporting Actor (Max Vento)	Won
2018	Cotton Wool	British Independent Film Festival	Best Supporting Actress (Katie Quinn)	Won
2018	Cotton Wool	British Independent Film Festival	Best Music	Nominated
2019	Cotton Wool	New York Film Awards	Best Picture	Won
2019	Cotton Wool	New York Film Awards	Best Young Filmmaker	Won
2019	Cotton Wool	New York Film Awards	Best Ensemble	Won
2019	Cotton Wool	New York Film Awards	Best Editing	Won
2019	Cotton Wool	New York Film Awards	Best Young Actress (Katie Quinn)	Won
2019	Cotton Wool	New York Film Awards	Best Supporting Actress (Crissy Rock)	Won
2019	Cotton Wool	New York Film Awards (Annual Ceremony)	Best of the Festival 2019	Nominated
2019	Cotton Wool	New York Film Awards (Annual Ceremony)	Best Director	Won
2019	Cotton Wool	New York Film Awards (Annual Ceremony)	Jury President Award	Won
2019	Cotton Wool	New York Film Awards (Annual Ceremony)	Best Narrative Feature	Won
2019	Cotton Wool	New York Film Awards (Annual Ceremony)	Best Actress (Leanne Best)	Won
2019	Cotton Wool	New York Film Awards (Annual Ceremony)	Best Duo (Katie Quinn & Leanne Best)	Won
2019	Cotton Wool	New York Film Awards (Annual Ceremony)	Best Editing of 2019	Won
2019	Cotton Wool	New York Film Awards (Annual Ceremony)	Best Ensemble of 2019	Won
2018	Cotton Wool	Birmingham Film Festival	Best Young Director	Nominated
2018	Cotton Wool	Unrestricted View Film Festival	Best Short Film	Nominated
2018	Cotton Wool	Unrestricted View Film Festival	Best Director (Nicholas Connor)	Nominated
2018	Cotton Wool	Unrestricted View Film Festival	Best Screenplay (Nicholas Connor)	Nominated
2018	Cotton Wool	Unrestricted View Film Festival	Best Actress (Leanne Best)	Won
2018	Cotton Wool	Manchester Screenplays and Shorts Film Festival	Best Actress (Leanne Best)	Won
2018	Cotton Wool	Manchester Lift-Off Film Festival	Special Mention	Won
2018	Cotton Wool	Gold Movie Awards	Film of the Year	Nominated
2018	Cotton Wool	Gold Movie Awards	Best Featurette – Annual Award	Won
2018	Cotton Wool	Gold Movie Awards	Film of the Month	Won
2018	Cotton Wool	Gold Movie Awards	Best Featurette – Monthly Award	Won
2018	Cotton Wool	Southampton International Film Festival	Best British Short Film	Nominated
2018	Cotton Wool	Southampton International Film Festival	Best Director	Nominated
2018	Cotton Wool	Out of the Can Film Festival	Best Drama	Won
2018	Cotton Wool	Out of the Can Film Festival	Best Lifestyle Project Award, Sponsored by Hellblazerbiz	Nominated
2018	Cotton Wool	Out of the Can Film Festival	Best Supporting Actress (Crissy Rock)	Nominated
2018	Cotton Wool	Out of the Can Film Festival	Best Screenplay	Nominated
2018	Cotton Wool	Out of the Can Film Festival	Judge's Choice Award	Won
2018	Cotton Wool	New Renaissance Film Festival	Humanity Award	Won
2018	Cotton Wool	New Renaissance Film Festival	Best Young Talent Narrative Short	Nominated
2018	Cotton Wool	New Renaissance Film Festival	Best Actress (Leanne Best)	Nominated
2019	Cotton Wool	The Monthly Film Festival	Best Film of the Year	Nominated
2019	Cotton Wool	The Monthly Film Festival	Best Short Film	Won
2019	Cotton Wool	The Monthly Film Festival	Best Director	Nominated
2019	Cotton Wool	The Monthly Film Festival	Best Screenplay	Nominated
2019	Cotton Wool	The Monthly Film Festival	Best Actress (Leanne Best)	Won
2019	Cotton Wool	The Monthly Film Festival	Best Editing	Nominated
2019	Cotton Wool	The Monthly Film Festival	Best Cinematography	Won
2019	Cotton Wool	The Monthly Film Festival	Best Original Score	Won
2018	Cotton Wool	Little Wing Film Festival	Best UK Short	Nominated
2018	Cotton Wool	Little Wing Film Festival	Best Director	Won
2018	Cotton Wool	Little Wing Film Festival	Best Screenplay	Nominated
2018	Cotton Wool	Little Wing Film Festival	Best Actress (Katie Quinn)	Nominated
