= The Guerilla Filmmakers Handbook =

Non-fiction film textbook

- Author: Chris Jones and Genevieve Jolliffe
- Language: English
- Genre: Non-fiction
- Publisher: Continuum International Publishing Group Ltd.
- Publication date: 2006 (third edition)
- Publication place: United Kingdom
- Media type: Paperback
- Pages: 768
- ISBN: 0-8264-7988-X
- OCLC: 67374318

The Guerilla Filmmakers Handbook is a bestselling textbook on low-budget and independent film production written by Chris Jones and Genevieve Jolliffe. Currently in its third edition, it consists primarily of interviews with filmmakers and case studies in filmmaking. The Handbook has become widely respected in the UK as a comprehensive filmmaking guide.

Jones and Jolliffe have also written three further books on film making. Chris Jones wrote The Guerilla Film Makers Movie Blueprint. Jones and Jolliffe also co-authored the US Guerilla Film Makers Handbook (aka Hollywood Handbook in the UK). Genevieve Jolliffe and Andrew Zinnes also wrote The Documentary Film Makers Handbook. Most recently the trio published the Guerilla Film Makers Pocketbook.

Jones and Jolliffe, the authors have made three low-budget movies: The Runner (1992), White Angel (1993) and Urban Ghost Story (1998). They also run courses in filmmaking through their production company, Living Spirit Pictures. Jolliffe now resides in Los Angeles, Jones now in Ealing, London, where their offices are based (Ealing Studios). Chris Jones recently directed an Oscars shortlisted short film, Gone Fishing, which won awards at over 40 international film festivals.

Film makers who cite the Guerilla Film Makers Handbook and its follow up books as influential to them include Simon Cox, the Writer/Director of Kaleidoscope Man and Allin Kempthorne, the Writer/Director of The Vampires of Bloody Island

== See also ==
- Independent film
- Guerrilla filmmaking
- Low-budget film
- Microfilmmaking
