= Michael Ferns =

Scottish film director and screenwriter

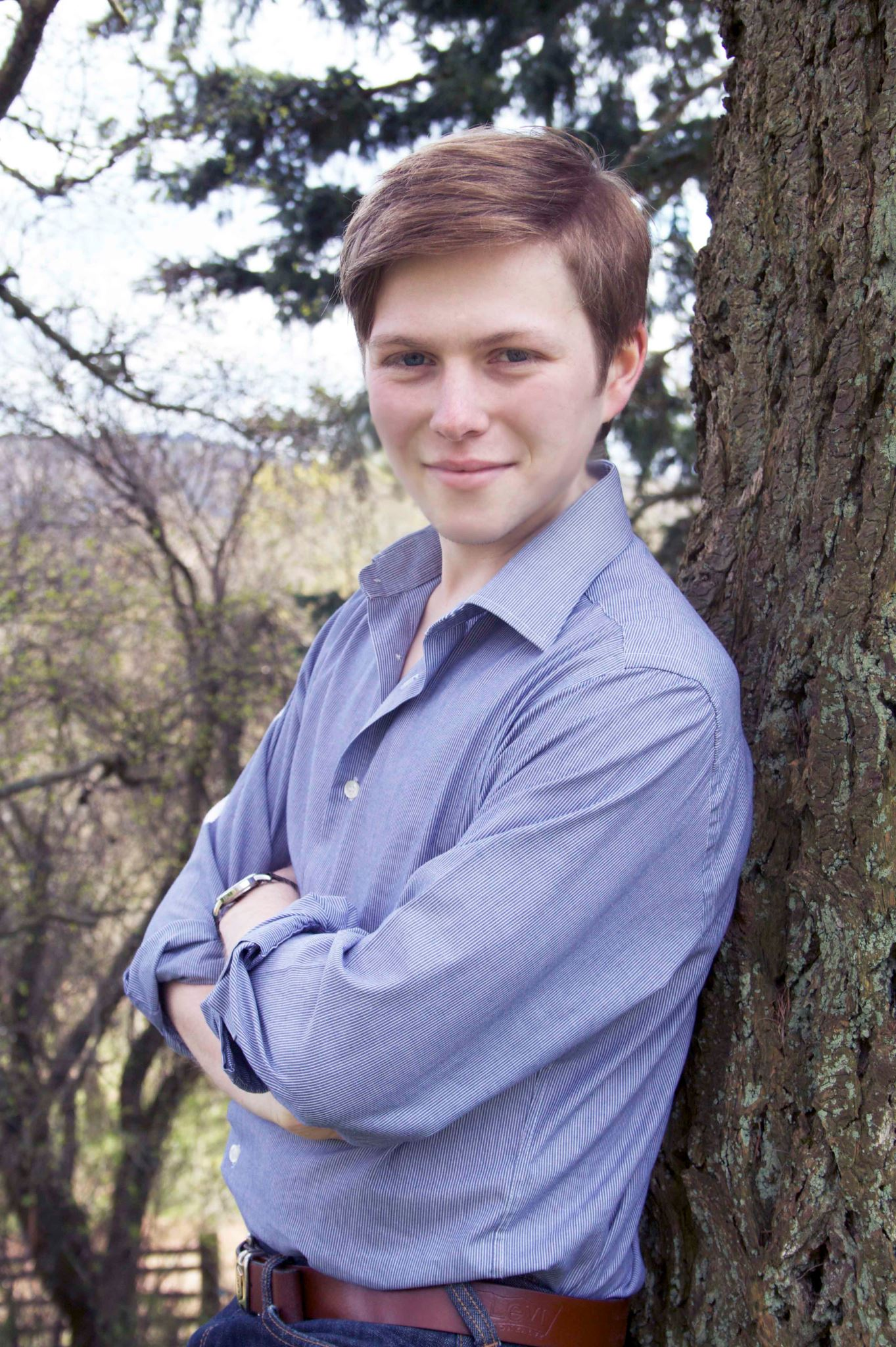
- Born: 13 November 1991 (age 34); Glasgow, Scotland, UK
- Education: Royal Conservatoire of Scotland
- Occupations: Film director film editor screenwriter
- Notable work: Letter From An Old Boy; Cupidity; Kirk
- Website: Official website

Michael Ferns is a Scottish film director and screenwriter. He is best known for his debut feature film Kirk about the life of Reverend Robert Kirk of Aberfoyle. The film won the 'Best Independent Feature' at the Festival of Fantastic Films and also earned Ferns the 'Best Director' award at the 2010 British Academy Scotland New Talent Awards.

== Life and career ==
A keen filmmaker and prominent member of the Strathendrick Film Society, Michael Ferns enrolled on the Digital Film and Television course at the Royal Conservatoire of Scotland. In 2009, he directed, photographed and edited his debut feature film, the historical fantasy Kirk about the life of Reverend Robert Kirk, a minister and scholar of the late 1600s. The film was very well received and appeared at the 2009 Festival of Fantastic Films in Manchester. The Festivals chairman, Gil Layne Young wrote "The direction was exciting, showing touches of quality that would be missed by much older directors. Kirk is a fantasy movie with roots in real Scottish life of the 17th century and for the first time in years I saw a bunch of real men wiping a tear from their eyes." Critic M. J. Simpson praised the director writing "Despite the director's youth, this is one of the most accomplished, mature, professional and impressive films I have seen for a very long time. I think it no exaggeration to say that, if Ferns lives up to the promise of this debut feature, then Kirk marks the arrival on the scene of a major new talent." In 2010, Ferns was awarded the 'Best Director' accolade at the 2010 British Academy Scotland New Talent Awards which was held at the Mitchell Theatre in Glasgow.

After graduating from the Royal Conservatoire of Scotland in 2012, Ferns embarked on his professional career. Whilst working on commercial pieces for clients such as the NHS and Diabetes UK, Ferns also directed the music video 'The Clown' for Beecake, the band of Lord of the Rings star Billy Boyd. The video was also screened at the 2013 Raindance Film Festival. Recently, Ferns was approached by the Aberlour Children's charity to direct a promotional film to commemorate the First World War centenary. Using never before heard words from real soldiers, Letter From An Old Boy tells the story of young men fighting on the front line in World War I, writing back to the orphanage they called home. The film was screened at the Edinburgh International Film Festival and the Glasgow Film Festival. Chris Binding of Flick Feat wrote " Michael Ferns produced a powerful short dramatizing the emotional correspondence that tied many young soldiers to home."

Ferns is currently working on the short film A Cold Day in June which stars Kathryn Howden, Tracy Wiles and Daniel Kerr who won the Best Acting Performance prize at the 2013 British Academy Scotland New Talent Awards.

== Filmography ==
Year	Film	Credited as			Notes
Year	Film	Director	Writer	Editor	Notes
2009	Kirk	Yes		Yes	Feature Film
2010	Highland Heartbeat PBS Pledge	Yes			TV movie
2010	The Day I Met Miss Rodgers	Yes		Yes	Short Film
2011	Bronco	Yes			Short Film
2011	Heads Up	Yes	Yes	Yes	Short Film
2011	Cupidity	Yes			Short Film
2012	One New Message			Yes	Short Film
2012	Please Stay	Yes	Yes		Music Video
2013	The Clown	Yes	Yes		Music Video
2014	Letter From An Old Boy	Yes	Yes	Yes	Short Film

== Awards ==
Year	Nominated Work	Awards	Category	Result
2009	Kirk	Festival of Fantastic Films	Best Feature Film	Won
2010	Kirk	British Academy Scotland New Talent Awards	Best Director	Won
