= Chris Jones (filmmaker) =

British film director and author

- Born: Higher End, Metropolitan Borough of Wigan, Greater Manchester, England
- Occupations: Filmmaker, author, film director, screenwriter, educator
- Years active: 1992–present
- Website: http://jonesfilm.co.uk/

Chris Jones is a British filmmaker, author, film director, screenwriter and educator, who has written books on becoming a film-maker. Jones was educated at Bournemouth Film School, and made his feature film director debut at the age of 21 with The Runner (1992). He owns the film company called Living Spirit.

His films include the 1994 British thriller film White Angel starring Peter Firth and Don Henderson, and Urban Ghost Story (1998), a horror film set in Glasgow starring Jason Connery.

== Works ==
Jones wrote and directed the short film Gone Fishing starring Bill Paterson, that premiered at BAFTA on 12 January 2008. Gone Fishing won 55 prizes at the film festival circuit including the Grand Prize at the 2008 Bahamas International Film Festival, and the 2008 Rhode Island International Film Festival, and it won the Grand Jury Prize at the 2009 Edmonton International Film Festival. At the 2009 Beverly Hills Film Festival and the 2009 Method Fest Independent Film Festival it took home the Audience Award, and it received the Golden Honu Award at the 2009 Big Island Film Festival. Gone Fishing further won both the Director's Choice Award and the Audience Award at the 2009 Sedona Film Festival, the Achievement Award for screenwriting at the 2009 Newport Beach Film Festival, and the prizes for Best Short at both the 2009 Indianapolis International Film Festival and the 2009 Palm Beach International Film Festival, as well as receiving the prize for Best Narrative Short by the Producers Guild of America. The film was among the final 10 long-listed shorts for the 2009 Academy Awards.

In 2009 Jones was attached to British thriller Exam as associate producer.

In 2014, he released a film, 50 Kisses, in collaboration with a large number of people organized through the London Screenwriters' Festival, and began work on Rocketboy.

In 2015 Jones co-produced the feature documentary The First Film about Louis Le Prince who is credited as a Leeds-based inventor of film.

In 2023 Jones executive produced the four part docuseries The Enfield Poltergeist for Apple TV+.

In 2023 Jones joined the Paramount Pictures M:I 7 and 8 team to direct splinter unit on Mission: Impossible Dead Reckoning and also Mission: Impossible – The Final Reckoning.

Jones is the author of several books on film-making, including The Guerilla Filmmakers Handbook. Having made several feature films on shoestring budgets, Jones has warned in 2010 that the British film industry needed to cut back on its spending if it was to survive. Jones teaches a variety of filmmaker courses from his Ealing Studio location,

== Filmography ==
=== Feature films ===
- The Runner – 1992, 90 min Super16 – Director
- White Angel – 1994, 90 min Super16 – Director
- Urban Ghost Story – 1998, 90 min Super16 – Co-writer with Genevieve Jolliffe, Producer & Second Unit Director
- 50 Kisses - 2014 - Co-writer
- Impact50 - 2022 - Producer
- Mission: Impossible Dead Reckoning - 2023, 164 min - Splinter Unit Director
- Mission: Impossible – The Final Reckoning - 2025 - Splinter Unit Director
- Rocketboy (forthcoming) – Director

=== Short films ===
- Gone Fishing – 2008, 13 min 35mm – Writer and director

=== Docuseries ===
- The Enfield Poltergeist - 2023 - Executive Producer

== Bibliography ==
- Chris Jones; Genevieve Jolliffe (1996). The Guerilla Film Makers Handbook and the Film Producers Toolkit. Cassell. ISBN 978-0-304-33854-2.
- Chris Jones (20 June 2003). Guerilla Film Makers Movie Blueprint. A&C Black. ISBN 978-0-8264-1453-3.
- Chris Jones; Genevieve Jolliffe (2006). The Guerilla Film Makers Handbook. A&C Black. ISBN 978-0-8264-7988-4.Macgregor, James. "The Guerilla Filmmakers Handbook – by Chris Jones & Genevieve Jolliffe".
- Chris Jones; Genevieve Jolliffe; Andrew Zinnes (18 March 2010). The Guerilla Film Makers Pocketbook: The Ultimate Guide to Digital Film Making. Bloomsbury Publishing. ISBN 978-1-4411-4705-9.

== Citations ==
- Fitzherbert Henry Film Critic. "Gone Fishing". The Sunday Express.
