= Billy Boyd =

Scottish actor and musician (born 1968)

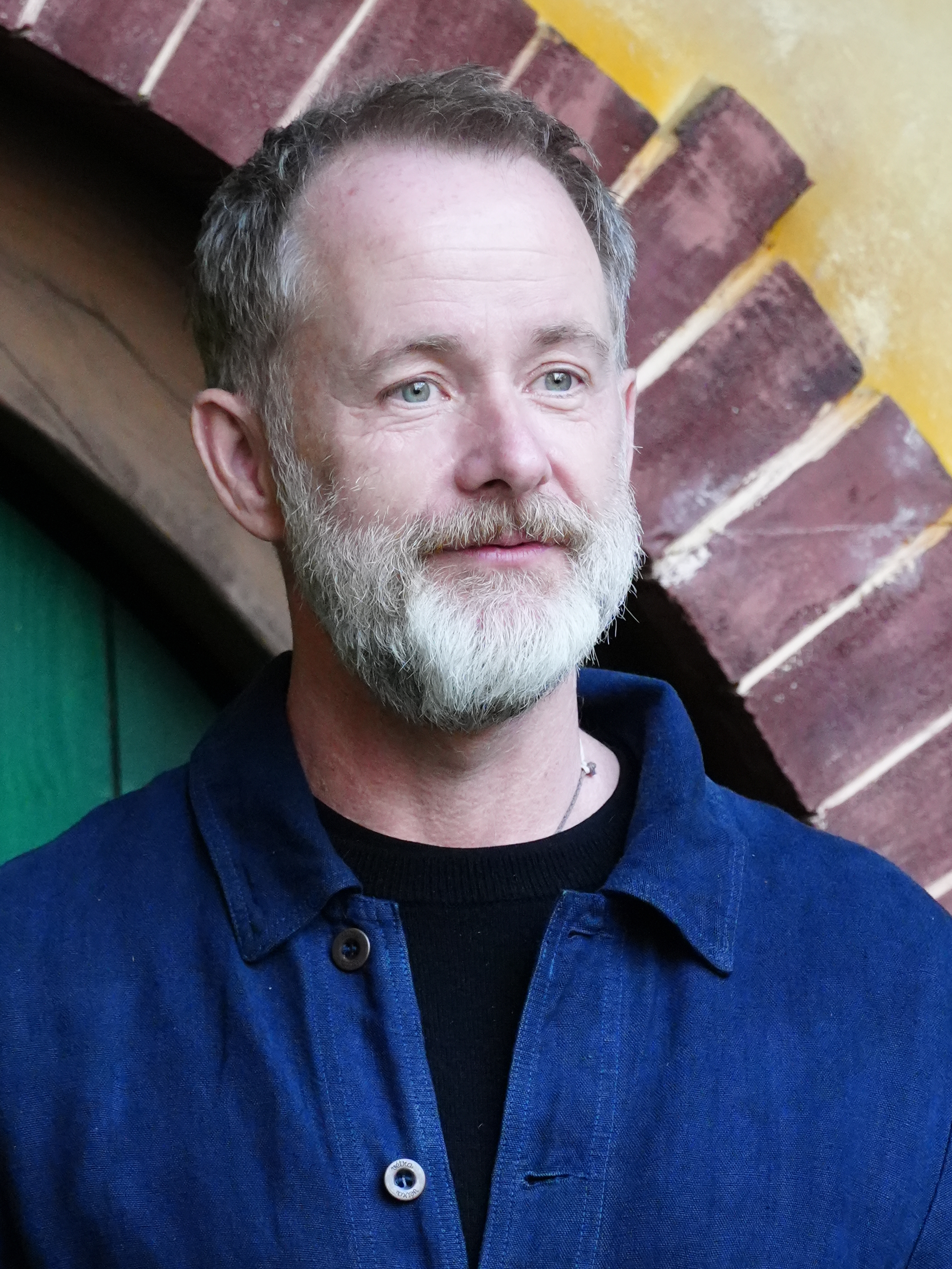
- Boyd in 2026
- Born: William Nathan Boyd; 28 August 1968 (age 58); Glasgow, Scotland
- Education: Royal Conservatoire of Scotland
- Occupations: Actor; musician
- Years active: 1996–present
- Spouse: Alison McKinnon (m. 2010)
- Children: 1

William Nathan Boyd (born 28 August 1968) is a Scottish actor and musician. He played Peregrin "Pippin" Took in Peter Jackson's epic film trilogy The Lord of the Rings (2001–2003), Barret Bonden in Master and Commander: The Far Side of the World (2003) and Glen and Glenda (later G.G. Valentine) in the Child's Play film Seed of Chucky (2004) and second season of the television series Chucky (2022).

== Early life ==
Boyd was born in Glasgow to William and Mary Boyd, who both died a year apart when Boyd was in his early teens. He worked as a bookbinder for six years before pursuing an acting career. After graduating from the Royal Scottish Academy of Music and Drama, he went on to perform with St Andrews Repertory and the Traverse Theatre.

== Career ==
=== Acting ===
Boyd started his career appearing in Taggart (1996), The Soldier's Leap (1998), and Urban Ghost Story (1998). He also appeared in the 7:84 Theatre Company Scotland production of Caledonia Dreaming by David Greig in 1997. His breakthrough, and most notable acting role, was Peregrin "Pippin" Took in The Lord of the Rings trilogy, from 2001 to 2003. Boyd wrote the melody for and sang the song "The Edge of Night", which was featured in The Lord of the Rings: The Return of the King. The song was later used over the trailer for The Hobbit: The Battle of the Five Armies (2014), the final film in the Hobbit trilogy. Boyd also wrote and performed the song "The Last Goodbye", which is played during the ending credits of the film.

In 2004, he starred as Glen and Glenda, Chucky's (Brad Dourif) and Tiffany's (Jennifer Tilly) offspring in the Child's Play film Seed of Chucky. He has also made a cameo appearance in the popular Scottish comedy Still Game in the second episode of the first series.

As well as being a screen actor, he also appears on the stage. Boyd has been in several plays; including San Diego and The Ballad of Crazy Paola. He performed at the Dundee Repertory Theatre in the role of Davie in Sunshine on Leith, as well as in Long Hong Jimmy, in which he was the lead actor. He also starred (2007) as Richard MacDuff in the BBC Radio adaptation of the book: Dirk Gently′s Holistic Detective Agency written by Douglas Adams.

In 2011, his feature film Glenn, the Flying Robot was shown in the Dawn Breakers International Film Festival, and was followed by a Netflix release. In June 2012, he appeared on stage as the voice of the guide in The Hitchhiker's Guide to the Galaxy live radio show. In 2013, Boyd played Banquo in Shakespeare's Macbeth, at the Shakespeare's Globe alongside Joseph Millson and Samantha Spiro.

Boyd together with fellow The Lord of the Rings castmates Sean Astin, Sean Bean, Orlando Bloom, Ian McKellen, Dominic Monaghan, Viggo Mortensen, Miranda Otto, John Rhys-Davies, Andy Serkis, Liv Tyler, Karl Urban, and Elijah Wood, plus writer Philippa Boyens and director Peter Jackson on 31 May 2020 joined Josh Gad's YouTube series Reunited Apart which reunites the cast of popular movies through video-conferencing, and promotes donations to non-profit charities.

In 2022, he reprised his Child's Play role in the second season finale of the television series Chucky, titled "Chucky Actually", as a merged incarnation of Glen and Glenda Tilly, known as G.G. Valentine.

He returned to the stage in 2024 with The Lord of the Rings castmate Dominic Monaghan in the Canadian production of Tom Stoppard's Rosencrantz and Guildenstern Are Dead.

=== Music ===
Boyd fronts a band called Beecake. The band was named after a time when Boyd's Lord of the Rings co-star Dominic Monaghan sent a picture of a cake covered in bees. Other members of the band included Paul Burke, Billy Johnston, and Rick Martin.

Boyd made a guest appearance on Viggo Mortensen's 2003 album Pandemoniumfromamerica, where he played the bass on two songs, as well as drums on another.

In June 2010, Beecake released an album Soul Swimming. As well as topping some of the international MySpace charts, the band was awarded VisitScotland's award for Best Live Act at the Tartan Clef Music Awards. The award was created by VisitScotland to celebrate Scotland's live music scene and Glasgow's new title of UNESCO City of Music.

Beecake released the EP Please Stay on 4 June 2012. The music video for the song "Please Stay" from the EP was released to coincide with the release of the EP. The song's music video was directed by Michael Ferns, a graduate from the RSAMD where Boyd himself graduated. The group released their second album Blue Sky Paradise in December 2012. The band released a second EP titled Just B in July 2013.

In 2014, Boyd wrote and performed the song "The Last Goodbye", which was played over the ending credits of the movie The Hobbit: The Battle of the Five Armies.

== Personal life ==
Boyd is an avid surfer and spent his free time surfing in New Zealand during the production for The Lord of the Rings. He also holds a Grade 7 in foil fencing. He trained in martial arts at the Krauseworld Academy in Glasgow under brothers Steve Krause and Mike Krause where he achieved Phase 4 rank in both Jeet Kune Do and Filipino Kali. He topped a list of the 100 Most Eligible Men in Scotland in 2002.

He owns a house in Glasgow with his wife, Alison McKinnon. The couple had their first child, a boy named Jack William Boyd, on 26 April 2006. He and McKinnon were married in a ceremony with 30 guests at Òran Mór in Glasgow's West End on 29 December 2010; the wedding was attended by Lord of the Rings castmates Elijah Wood and Dominic Monaghan. A reception was held afterwards for about 130 guests.

Boyd has a tattoo of the Elvish word for "nine" written with the Tengwar script, a reference to his involvement in The Lord of the Rings, and the fact that his character was one of the nine members of the Fellowship of the Ring. The other actors of the Fellowship (Elijah Wood, Sean Astin, Sean Bean, Ian McKellen, Dominic Monaghan, Viggo Mortensen, and Orlando Bloom) got the same tattoo, with the exception of John Rhys-Davies, whose stunt double got the tattoo instead.

He remains close with The Lord of the Rings co-star Dominic Monaghan. Monaghan revealed in an interview for the national breakfast television show GMTV that he continues to see Boyd on a regular basis, as he is "essentially, kind of, godfather to his kid." Boyd and Monaghan co-host the podcast ‘The Friendship Onionʼ together.

Boyd is one of the patrons of Scottish Youth Theatre, Scotland's National Theatre "for and by" young people. He is also the patron of the National Boys' Choir of Scotland.

=== Holidays in Scotland ===
In 2008, Boyd fronted VisitScotland's Perfect Day Campaign and talked of his love of surfing in Scotland, particularly in Machrihanish near the town of Campbeltown in Kintyre in the west coast of Scotland and also Pease Bay and Coldingham Bay on Scotland's east coast. In an interview about the campaign with The Scotsman on 28 July 2008, he said: "I don't really do much promotional stuff but felt that with this one I could be honest... I'm very proud of where I come from and I get very excited if a friend comes over and I can show them around."

== Filmography ==
=== Film ===
Year	Title	Role	Notes
1998	Urban Ghost Story	Loan Shark	
1999	Julie and the Cadillacs	Jimmy Campbell	
2001	The Lord of the Rings: The Fellowship of the Ring	Peregrin "Pippin" Took	
2002	The Lord of the Rings: The Two Towers	Peregrin "Pippin" Took	
2003	The Lord of the Rings: The Return of the King	Peregrin "Pippin" Took	
2003	Master and Commander: The Far Side of the World	Barret Bonden	
2004	Seed of Chucky	Glen, Glenda	Voice
2005	On a Clear Day	Danny	
2005	Stories of Lost Souls	The Gunner	Segment: "Sniper 470"
2005	Midsummer Dream	Puck	Voice
2006	The Flying Scotsman	Malky	
2008	Stone of Destiny	Bill Craig	
2009	Jusqu'à toi	Rufus	
2010	Pimp	Chief	
2010	Glenn, the Flying Robot	Jack	
2011	Irvine Welsh's Ecstasy	Woodsy	
2012	The Forger	Bernie	
2012	Dorothy and the Witches of Oz	Nick Chopper	
2012	Space Milkshake	Anton	
2014	The Hobbit: The Battle of the Five Armies	—N/a	Co-wrote and performed the song "The Last Goodbye" that plays over the end credits of the film
2015	Mara and the Firebringer	Tourist	
2016	Stoner Express	Gordon	
2016	White Island	Kyle	
2018	Tell It to the Bees	Older Charlie	Voice
2021	The Loud House Movie	Scott, Fisherman, additional voices	Voice
2021	An Intrusion	Minister Fairfield	
2021	Walking with Herb	Archibald "Archie" Borthwick	
2021	Invisible Manners	Narrator	
2024	The Lord of the Rings: The War of the Rohirrim	Shank	Voice
2025	Dog Man	Seamus	Voice

=== Television ===
Year	Title	Role	Notes
1996	Taggart	Jamie Holmes	Episode: "Dead Man's Chest"
1999	Coming Soon	Ross	Miniseries
2002	Still Game	Bearded Man	Episode: "Faimly"
2004	Instant Credit	Frankie	Short television film
2007	Save Angel Hope	Vince Sandhurst	Television film
2008	Empty	Tony	6 episodes
2011	Moby Dick	Elijah	Miniseries, 2 episodes
2012	Casualty	Duncan Jessup	Episode: "Hero Syndrome"
2014	Wild Things with Dominic Monaghan	Himself	Episode: "The Giant Wetapunga"
2015	Motive	Lawrence Frampton	Episode: "Frampton Comes Alive"
2017	Sofia the First	Malachite (voice)	Episode: "The Crown of Blossoms"
2017	Snowfall	Jim Stewart	Episode: "Baby Teeth"
2017	The Simpsons	Himself (voice)	Episode: "The Serfsons"
2018, 2020	Outlander	Gerald Forbes	4 episodes
2019	Grey's Anatomy	Seamus	Episode: "I Walk the Line"
2020	Hollywood	Noël Coward	Episode: "Outlaws"
2021	Doom Patrol	Samuelson	Episode: “Vacay Patrol”
2022	NCIS: Hawai'i	Colin McIntyre	Episode: “Ohana”
2022	Chucky	G.G. Valentine (voice)	Episode: "Chucky Actually"
2023	The Legend of Vox Machina	Garmelie (voice)	
2023	That's My Jam	Himself	
2024-2025	The Wingfeather Saga	The Overseer	Seasons 2-3 recurring role; 5 episodes
2025	Billy and Dom Eat the World	Himself	8 episodes
2025	Washington Black	Willard	

=== Theatre ===
Year	Title	Role	Venue	Notes
2013	Macbeth	Banquo	Shakespeare's Globe	
2024	Rosencrantz and Guildenstern Are Dead	Guildenstern	Neptune Theatre	
2024	Rosencrantz and Guildenstern Are Dead	Guildenstern	CAA Theatre	

=== Audio dramas ===
Year	Title	Role	Notes
2007	Dirk Gently's Holistic Detective Agency	Richard MacDuff	BBC Radio 4
2008	The Long Dark Tea-Time of the Soul	Richard MacDuff	BBC Radio 4
2022	Moriarty: The Devil's Game	Colonel Sebastian Moran	Audible Original

=== Video games ===
Year	Title	Role	Notes
2003	The Lord of the Rings: The Return of the King	Peregrin "Pippin" Took	Voice role
2004	The Lord of the Rings: The Battle for Middle-earth	Peregrin "Pippin" Took	Voice role
2006	The Lord of the Rings: The Battle for Middle-earth II: The Rise of the Witch-king	Peregrin "Pippin" Took	Voice role
2013	Lego The Lord of the Rings	Peregrin "Pippin" Took	Archive audio
2019	Magic: The Gathering Arena	Will Kenrith	
2020, 2022	The Elder Scrolls Online	Bradan, Brahgas	

== Awards and nominations ==
Broadcast Film Critics Association Award

- 2004: Won, "Best Acting Ensemble" – The Lord of the Rings: The Return of the King (shared with cast)

DVD Exclusive Awards

- 2003: Nominated, "Best Audio Commentary" – The Lord of the Rings: The Two Towers (shared with cast)

Empire Awards

- 2002: Nominated, "Best Debut" – The Lord of the Rings: The Fellowship of the Ring (shared with Dominic Monaghan)

National Board of Review of Motion Pictures

- 2003: Won, "Best Acting by an Ensemble" – The Lord of the Rings: The Return of the King (shared with cast)

Online Film Critics Society

- 2003: Won, "Best Ensemble" – The Lord of the Rings: The Two Towers (shared with cast)

Screen Actors Guild Awards

- 2002: Nominated, "Outstanding Performance by the Cast of a Theatrical Motion Picture" – The Lord of the Rings: The Fellowship of the Ring (shared with cast)
- 2003: Nominated, "Outstanding Performance by the Cast of a Theatrical Motion Picture" – The Lord of the Rings: The Two Towers (shared with cast)
- 2004: Won, "Outstanding Performance by the Cast of a Theatrical Motion Picture" – The Lord of the Rings: The Return of the King (shared with cast)
