= 2010 British Academy Scotland New Talent Awards =

- Date: 19 March 2010
- Site: Mitchell Theatre; Glasgow; Scotland

Television coverage
- Network: Streaming webcast

The 2010 British Academy Scotland New Talent Awards were held on 19 March 2010 at the Mitchell Theatre in Glasgow. Presented by BAFTA Scotland, the accolades honour the best upcoming talent in the field of film and television in Scotland. The Nominees were announced on 10 March 2010.

== Winners and nominees ==
Winners are listed first and highlighted in boldface.

Best Fiction Film	Best Acting Performance
**Entwined – Reeve Rixon, Ryan Blackwood**: Choices – Ryan Hendrick, Robert McGroary; Parliamo – Hope Dickson Leach, Vicki Patterson, Stewart Thomson; Talking Piranhas – Gregory Vardarinos, Willem van Heemstra, Jean Pierre Magro	**Eric Robertson – Narrow Gauge as William**: Darren Osborne – A Good Mate as Flatmate; Kerry Parish – Freeze; Keira Lucchesi – River City as Stella Walker
Best Director	Best Writer
**Michael Ferns – Kirk**: Marc De Launay – Dark Nature; Sharon McCance – Glasgow Urban Collective - The Legacy	**Dark Nature – Eddie Harrison**: Stix and Stanes – John McArdle
Best Producer	Best Factual
**Britt Crowley - Wind Over Lake**: Breid McLoone – Comic Relief's Naughty	**Fistful of Roses – Leo Bruges, Peter Gerard**: Just To Call You Dad – Patricia Delso Lucas; Maria's Way – Anne Milne; The Shutdown – Adam Stafford, Peter Gerard, Alan Bisset
Best Music Video	Best Animation
**Lamb and The Lion (The Mae Shi) – Natalia Stuyk**: The Stand Off (Le Reno Amps) – Felix Gilfedder, Andrew Green; Jonquil (Lions) – Steve Warne And Julian Krubasik	**Battenberg – Stewart Comrie, Anna Odell**: Monster In The Toilet – Ania Leszczynska; Welcome To Twister – Owen Rixon
Best Game	Best Interactive
**Shrunk – Michael Cummings, Vykintas Kazdailis, Andrew Macdonald, Stuart Kemp, Jacek Wernikowski**: Colour-Coded – Liam Wong, Murray Sinclair, Faye Wright, Sean Donnelly, Nnanna Kama	**The Devil's Plantation – May Miles Thomas**: The Lost Book – Helen Jackson & Adam Brewster
Best Experimental
**Spring Forward Fall Back – Gerry Hay**: I am Nothing. I Am Just a Man – Joshua Loftin; Symmetry – Steven Shand

=== Special Award for Student Work ===
- Maria's Way
