= Ladybird, Ladybird (film) =

- Directed by: Ken Loach
- Written by: Rona Munro
- Produced by: Sally Hibbin
- Starring: Crissy Rock; Vladimir Vega
- Cinematography: Barry Ackroyd
- Edited by: Jonathan Morris
- Music by: George Fenton
- Distributed by: United International Pictures
- Release date: 16 June 1994
- Running time: 101 minutes
- Country: United Kingdom
- Language: English
- Box office: £97,482

Ladybird, Ladybird is a 1994 British drama film directed by Ken Loach, starring Crissy Rock and Vladimir Vega. The film received positive reviews from critics, and Rock won the Silver Bear for Best Actress award at the 44th Berlin International Film Festival.

== Plot ==
In a London karaoke bar some time around 1987, Maggie Conlan, a woman with a troubled past, meets Paraguayan immigrant Jorge and has a drink with him. She confesses to Jorge (whom she calls George) that her four children, all with different fathers, are in the care of social services. Maggie leaves but forgets her wallet, which Jorge returns to her after chasing down her bus. The pair go to a pizza restaurant, then return to Jorge's apartment, where Maggie tells Jorge about her experiences with her abusive, alcoholic ex-boyfriend Simon, which led her to move into a domestic violence refuge. The two begin to kiss but Maggie grows hysterical and attempts to storm out of Jorge's apartment, revealing her unresolved feelings of loss for her children.

In a flashback, Maggie is singing in a club when she is called home by the bartender and discovers that there has been a fire at the refuge and her son Sean has been injured in the fire. Maggie goes to the hospital where she is interviewed by the police, who are concerned that Maggie left the children alone. She claims to have left the key with a friend, but the friend has no recollection of this. Sean is then placed in foster care. Maggie visits him and is micromanaging and rude to his foster mother, Mary, and causes Sean pain as she improperly changes his bandages. Back in the present, Maggie and Jorge have sex.

In another flashback, Maggie meets with a pair of social workers, who tell her that she needs to be assessed at a halfway house in order to have a chance at receiving Sean back, to which she is resistant. She eventually gives in and goes to the halfway house, but leaves almost immediately after seeing an altercation with another patient. Now a quasi-fugitive, her sister Mairead says she cannot stay with her family, and Maggie says she cannot return to the refuge. This leads to her returning to Simon, with whom she plans to leave town. As they are leaving, a social worker confronts Maggie and tells her that she will lose her children if she flees the city, but Maggie leaves anyway. Simon insists that they stop and collect Maggie's government welfare check, but she fears that the authorities will find them. Simon kicks her out of the van and assaults her, and she leaves the children in Simon's van where they later taken by the police. Back in the present, Jorge reveals that he is a political refugee from Paraguay, and has not returned for fear he will be killed due to his dissident views. He also reveals that he has a wife back in Paraguay, but has been away so long that he is not sure whether or not they are still married.

At Maggie's court hearing, a doctor testifies that Maggie loves her children, but is not capable of properly caring for them, citing her history with Simon. Maggie begins to audibly protest, and runs out of the courtroom. Jorge, meanwhile, reveals that his visa has expired and he will stay in England as an illegal alien, tearing up his plane tickets and declaring his commitment to Maggie, who is later revealed to be pregnant with Jorge's child. The pair move into a new flat, and Jorge acquires an under-the-table job at a chicken restaurant. He returns home to Maggie, who has a breakdown when she sees an adoption advertisement in the newspaper for Sean.

Maggie and Jorge get into a dispute with their irritable elderly neighbor Mrs. Higgs, who makes racial comments about Jorge. Maggie goes to the hospital and has the baby, but Jorge's supervisor docks his pay for missing work. A health visitor comes to enquire about the baby, but Maggie lies about her identity and refuses her entry. The health visitor returns later, revealing that she knows Maggie's children are in care, urging her to bring the baby to the clinic for a checkup. While Mairead and her children are visiting the flat, the police and Social Services arrive and take the baby under a place of safety order (it is implied that Mrs. Higgs called Social Services on the family). Maggie grows visibly distraught and has to be restrained as the police take the baby.

Maggie interviews with a series of Social Services workers in order to keep the baby, but grows tired of putting up a facade and berates one of the interviewers, revealing her long-seated hatred for Social Services based on her belief that they failed to remove her from her sexually abusive home as a young girl. At a new trial, Mrs. Higgs takes the stand and lies that Jorge has been physically abusive to Maggie. The court also grills Jorge about his past in Paraguay. While Jorge takes a break from the proceedings, he is served with deportation papers after his employer reveals his status as an illegal immigrant as a form of retaliation. The court eventually declares that Maggie is an unfit mother due to her lack of self control, lack of intellect, and refusal to work with Social Services. Later, Jorge returns to the flat and reveals that he has been granted permission to remain in the country due to his good character. He reiterates his desire to stay with Maggie, who becomes hysterical and assaults Jorge, who walks out of the apartment before returning and reconciling with Maggie. Maggie becomes pregnant again, and after the baby is born, Social Services arrives and announces that they have another place of safety order to execute. Maggie attempts to throw herself out of the window, and is sedated as a response. The film cuts to Maggie and Jorge at home, where they have one final fight and reconciliation. The film ends with a title card over the last moments of footage:

Maggie and Jorge have had three more children whom they have been allowed to keep. They have been given no access to their first two daughters. Maggie says that she thinks every day of all her lost children.

== Cast ==
- Crissy Rock as Maggie Conlan
- Vladimir Vega as Jorge
- Sandie Lavelle as Mairead
- Mauricio Venegas as Adrian
- Ray Winstone as Simon
- Claire Perkins as Jill
- Jason Stracey as Sean
- Luke Brown as Mickey
- Lily Farrell as Serena
- Scottie Moore as Maggie's father
- Linda Ross as Maggie's mother
- Rosemary Frankau as Lawyer
- Yvonne Riley as Lead Social Worker

== Soundtrack ==
- "Candles" – Written by Caly Domitila Caneck
- "Delilah" – Written by Les Reed and Barry Mason
- "I Like It" – Written by Mitch Murray
- "Whole Lotta Shaking Going On" – Written by Curly Williams and Sunny David
- "Ain't Nothin' Goin' On But the Rent" – Written by Gwen Guthrie
- "(I Never Promised You a) Rose Garden" – Written by Joe South
- "The Rose" – Written by Amanda McBroom
- "Up Where We Belong" – Written by Jack Nitzsche, Will Jennings and Buffy Sainte-Marie
- "La Felicidad" – Written by Palito Ortega

== Release ==
=== Reception ===
Review aggregator website Rotten Tomatoes gives the film an approval rating of 67%, based on 9 reviews.

In a review that awarded four stars out of four, critic Roger Ebert declared Crissy Rock's performance "the strongest performance in any film of the last 12 months" and opined she should get an Oscar nomination.

=== Awards and nominations ===
The film won the Prize of the Ecumenical Jury at the 44th Berlin International Film Festival. For her performance, Rock won the award for Best Actress at the 1994 Chicago International Film Festival. She also won a London Film Critics Circle Award for British Actress of the Year and was nominated for a New York Film Critics Circle Award for Best Actress. Ladybird, Ladybird received a nomination for Best Foreign Film at the 10th Independent Spirit Awards.

=== Year-end lists ===
- 7th – Glenn Lovell, San Jose Mercury News
- 12th – Janet Maslin, The New York Times
- Honorable mention – Michael MacCambridge, Austin American-Statesman
