= Paul Gough =

British academic

- Education: Royal College of Art, London
- Occupations: Writer, Academic
- Organization: Arts University Bournemouth

Paul Gough is a British academic, writer, painter, broadcaster and recently retired Principal and Vice Chancellor of Arts University Bournemouth. Previous leadership positions include Pro-Vice Chancellor and Vice-President RMIT University, Melbourne, Australia, and Deputy Vice Chancellor, UWE, Bristol, UK.

== Biography ==
Gough was educated at Aberdeen Grammar School. He graduated from the Polytechnic Wolverhampton in 1979 and the Royal College of Art, London in 1985 with a Master's degree in Painting. In 1991 he was awarded his PhD on First World War art, later published as 'A Terrible Beauty': British Artists in the First World War In January 2026 Gough was appointed Chair of Arnolfini, Bristol’s international centre for contemporary art.

== Painting ==
As a painter, Gough has exhibited globally is represented in several permanent art collections – including the National Arts Collection Fund, the Imperial War Museum, London; Canadian War Museum, and the National War Memorial, New Zealand. Gough was elected an Academician of the Royal West of England Academy in 2000, and became Chair of the Board of Trustees in 2013.

Gough is a regular media commentator on the street artist Banksy. During 2021 he was consulted by UK and global television, radio and print media for insights about the artist’s mural paintings, ‘Spraycation’, painted and installed across East Anglia. During Summer 2024 Gough made numerous media interviews and articles in UK and overseas publications regarding Banksy’s public London Zoo stencils throughout London.

In 2022, a short film alleging Gough was the street artist went viral over TikTok, receiving more than two million views. Gough’s illustrated monograph, Banksy: Cultural Outlaw was launched at the MShed Museum in Bristol on 24 June 2025.

His most recent exhibitions have been in Melbourne, Australia, London, and Wellington, New Zealand. He was selected to exhibit in The Art of Creative Research NIE Gallery, Singapore in January 2023. In 2018 Gough was invited as one of 6 artists in Australia and 6 in the USA, who had previously had experience of working with the military in a range of ways, to create an artwork commemorating the centenary of the moment when Australian and US forces fought alongside for the first time in the First World War. “The Kangaroo and the Eagle: Allies in War and Peace 1918 – 2018” was exhibited in the Pentagon, in Washington, D.C. from August 2022.

== Writing ==
As an author, Gough has published over 80 academic papers, and nine books which cover the representation of war and peace, including several books on the British artist Stanley Spencer and a study of the work of John and Paul Nash which was published as part of a comprehensive suite of exhibitions, commissions and other events he curated during the centenary period of the First World War (2014–18). In April 2024 Gough's book 'Gilbert Spencer: the Life and Work of a Very English Artist' was published by Yale University Press. The biography was selected by Country Life as one of the twelve ‘unputdownable’ books from 2024.

In the past five years, Gough has given conference addresses and keynote speeches in Australia, New Zealand, Turkey, Macedonia, Belgium, France and UK. These include addresses at memorial sites and museums of remembrance and on overseas and BBC television and radio.

== Television, film and radio ==
As a broadcaster, Gough worked for a decade as a television presenter, researcher and associate producer on a range of creative arts programmes and documentaries, including the award-winning documentary Redundant Warrior, about the photographer Don McCullin. He is often invited on to BBC and commercial channels to comment on the arts, appearing on BBC R4 'The Moral Maze', 29 June 2024, as expert witness on 'Price versus Value in Arts and Culture'. Gough also has a credit for design research in the Aardman Animations feature film, Chicken Run.

== Academia ==
In addition to appointments on education and research panels in UK, Europe, Hong Kong and New Zealand, Gough was Deputy Vice-Chancellor at the University of the West of England, Bristol; and for six years, 2014-2019 Vice-President at RMIT University, Melbourne, Australia. In Australia Gough was Chair of RMIT Training and Chair of the Board of RMIT Europe, the university overseas operations based in Barcelona. In 2019, Gough was appointed Principal and Vice-Chancellor of Arts University Bournemouth. After 40 years in UK and international higher education he retired in January 2025. Gough was awarded an Honorary Fellowship of UWiC, Cardiff (2009), he was appointed an Honorary Doctor of Arts, UWE Bristol (2014) and became Honorary Professor in the School of Art, RMIT (2020 to present). In 2026 Gough was appointed Distinguished Professor in Art & Design at British University Vietnam, Hanoi.

== Bibliography ==
- Gough, Paul (2006). Stanley Spencer: Journey to Burghclere. Bristol: Sansom. ISBN 1-904537-46-4.
- Gough, Paul (2010). A Terrible Beauty: British Artists and the First World War. Bristol: Sansom. ISBN 978-1-906593-00-1.
- Gough, Paul (2011). Your loving friend, Stanley: the correspondence between Desmond Chute and Stanley Spencer. Cookham: Stanley Spencer Gallery. ISBN 978-1906593766.
- Gough, Paul (2012). Banksy: the Bristol Legacy. Bristol: Redcliffe. ISBN 978-1-906593964.
- Gough, Paul (2014). 'Brothers in Arms', John and Paul Nash, and the aftermath of the Great War. Bristol: Sansom. ISBN 978-1908326522.
- Gough, Paul (2015). 'Back from the Front': Art, Memory and the Aftermath of War. Bristol Cultural Development Partnership. ISBN 978-0955074257.
- Gough, Paul (2016). 'Zawn': Walking West Penwith. Cliff-edge painting by Paul Lewin. Bristol: Redcliffe. ISBN 978-1908326973.
- Gough, Paul (2016). 'A concentrated utterance of total war' - Paul Nash, CWR Nevinson and the challenge of representation in the Great War, in Bourke, Joanna (editor) War and Art: A Visual History of Modern Conflict. London: Reaktion. ISBN 978-1780238463.
- Gough, Paul (2017). The Holy Box. The genesis of Stanley Spencer's Sandham Memorial Chapel. Bristol: Sansom. ISBN 978-1-911408-09-3.
- Gough, Paul (2018). Dead Ground. War and Peace: Remembrance and Recovery. A Cultural reading of Memoryscapes from the Great War. Melbourne: Bowen Street Press. ISBN 978-1911408451.
- Gough, Paul (2024). Gilbert Spencer: The Life and Work of a Very English Artist. London: Yale University Press. ISBN 978-0300269819.
- Gough, Paul (2025). Banksy: Cultural Outlaw. Bristol: Sansom & Company. ISBN 978-1-915670236.
