= Katrina Tang =

Estonian photographer (born 1985)

- Born: 17 May 1985 (age 41); Tallinn, then part of Estonian SSR, Soviet Union
- Education: Arts University Bournemouth
- Occupations: Photographer, art director

Katrina Tang (born 17 May 1985) is an entrepreneur and photographer.

Katrina Tang is an Estonian international children's fashion and portrait photographer, art director, and videographer.

Katrina Tang is a founder and chief executive officer of the web platform LittleFamilyHub.

== Life and work ==
Born in Tallinn, Estonia, Tang went to high school in Pärnu. She moved to England in 2003 and went to the Arts Institute at Bournemouth where she received her BA (Hons) in Commercial Photography in 2008. After that she moved to London and started to work for children's brands and magazines. At present Tang is working internationally and mostly travels between New York City, London, Paris, and Estonia.

Tang has worked on a number of international well known children's brands and publications including Clarks, Mini Boden, Oeuf NYC, Fcuk, Very French Gangsters, Medela, The Times newspaper, Milk Magazine, and many more.

Tang has a young son.

== Awards ==
- 2008: Finalist, Nikon Discovery Awards, Olympia Conference Centre, London UK, for "Overlooked: The Charm of Country School"
- 2008: Finalist, Fashion story "Arwin" finalist in AOP student award 2008, AOP Gallery, London UK
- 2009: Finalist, Royal Photographic Society 152nd International Print Exhibition, Allen&Overy LLP, London UK, for "Overlooked: The Charm of Country School"
- 2010: Merit, PDN The LOOK, for Personal Work “Follow the Ribbon”
- 2013: Gold Stevie Award for Women in Business, Best Retail/Marketing Campaign of the Year, for Babesta Beat magazine, Mimi & the Magic Forest fashion story & Mimi & the Magic Forest video
- 2015: New and emerging photographer's to watch in 2015, Photo District News 30
- 2015: Top Most outstanding Estonian woman in the world, Estonian World

== Exhibitions ==
- 2008: "Overlooked: The Charm of Country School" exhibited in “Delight” AIB Graduate Exhibition, AOP Gallery, London UK, Jul '08
- 2010: "Overlooked: The Charm of Country School" exhibited in Photoville, New York, May '10
- 2011: "Spirits of Tomorrow" being part of ISSP 2011 Gala Exhibition at Goethe Institute Riga, Latvia, Oct-Nov‘11
- 2011: “Rustic Charms” solo exhibition at Pärnu Endla Theatre, Estonia, Sep ‘11
- 2011: "Above Estonian soil, under Nordic skies" exhibition with designer Maarja Tali at Tallinn Design and Architecture Gallery, Estonia, Aug ‘11
- 2011: "Spirits of Tomorrow" ISSP 2011 exhibition in Kuldiga, Latvia, Aug ‘11
- 2011: “Road trip to Hiiumaa – whatever the weather” solo exhibition at Pärnu Jacht Club, Estonia, Jul‘11 - present
- 2011: “Road trip to Hiiumaa – whatever the weather” solo exhibition during Sõru Jazz festival, Hiiumaa, Estonia, Jun ‘11
- 2011: “Rustic Charms” solo exhibition at Boheem, Tallinn, Estonia, Jan- Apr ‘11
- 2012: “Childen are Born in Heart” exhibition at the Estonian Parliament, Tallinn, Estonia, Sep ‘12
- 2012: “Childen are Born in Heart” exhibition at Paide Cultural center, Estonia, Jun ‘12
- 2012: “Rustic Charms” solo exhibition at Paide History Centre Wittenstein, Estonia, Jun ‘12 - present
- 2012: “Rustic Charms” solo exhibition at Suigu Seltsimaja, Estonia, Apr - May ‘12
- 2012: “Rustic Charms” solo exhibition at Pärnu Hospital, Estonia, Feb-Mar ‘12
- 2014: "Overlooked: The Charm of Country School" in Estonia Photographic Art Fair FOKU, Tallinn, Estonia, Oct ‘14
- 2014: "Overlooked: The Charm of Country School" exhibition at Evald Okas Museum, Haapsalu, Estonia, July-Aug ‘14
- 2015: "Overlooked: The Charm of Country School" in Museum of Estonian Architecture, Tallinn, Estonia, Summer '15
- 2015:"PDN '30" in Photoville, Brooklyn, NY, Sept '15
