= National Youth Choir of Scotland =

NYCOS (National Youth Choir of Scotland)
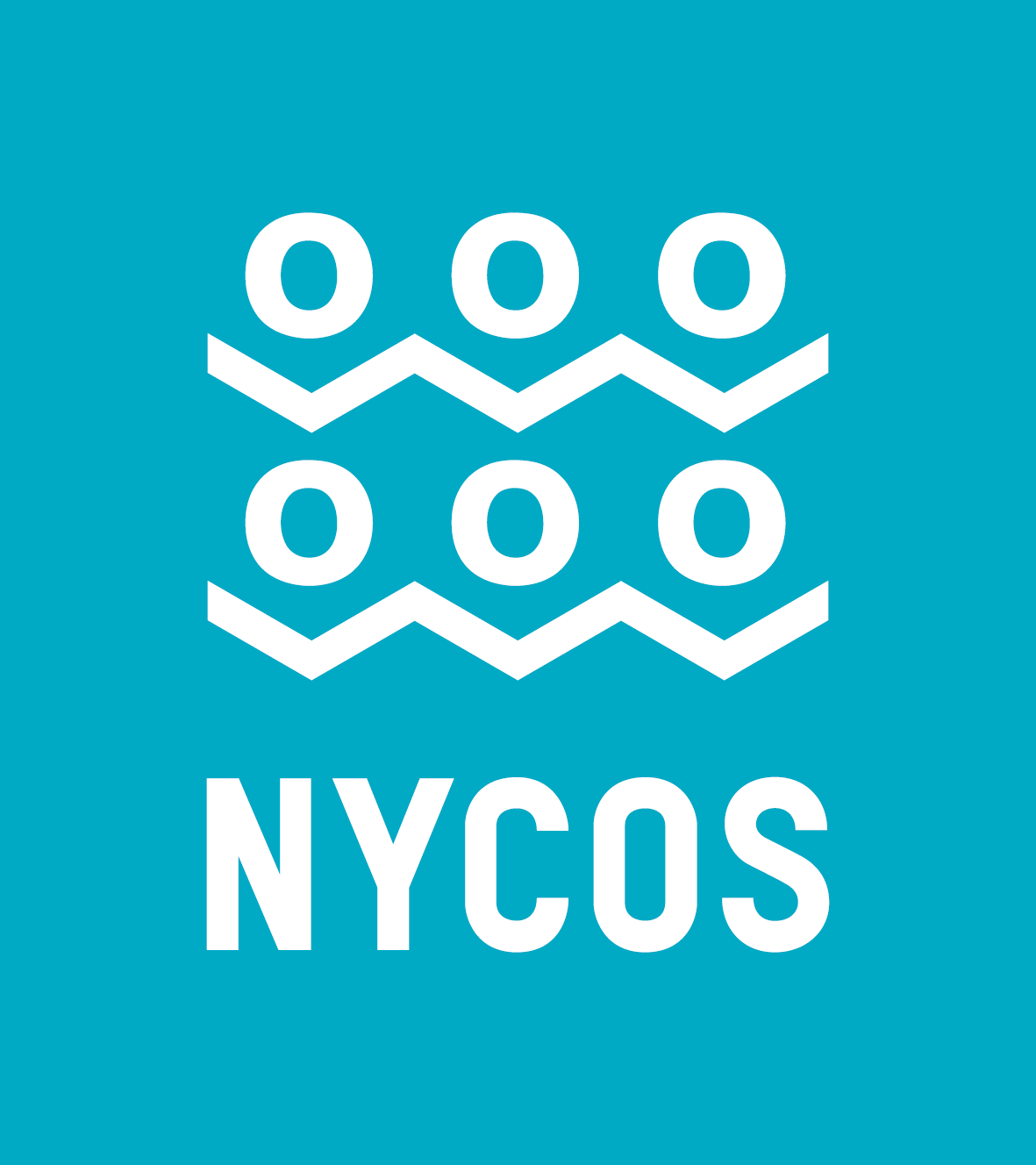
- Founded: 1996
- Founder: Christopher Bell
- Headquarters: Glasgow, Scotland
- Website: nycos.co.uk

NYCOS (formerly known as National Youth Choir of Scotland or NYCoS) is a Scottish charity (registration number: SC024899) which is the largest choir/musical organisation in Scotland for singers aged 0–25.

Led by Artistic Director, Christopher Bell, NYCOS says its goal is to:

“provide opportunities for young people, teachers and choir directors to support and develop choral singing across Scotland.”

NYCOS activities currently include 4 National Choirs, 14 Regional Choirs, Mini Music Makers classes and a range of music educational projects. NYCOS also commissions and publishes a range of publications, songbooks and educational resources.

== Background ==
NYCOS was founded as a single choir in 1996 by its current Artistic Director, Christopher Bell with support from the then Director of the National Youth Orchestra of Scotland, Richard Chester. Bell felt that, whilst Scotland had national youth ensembles for orchestra, strings, jazz and brass, there were less opportunities for young singers to participate at a national level and standard. Bell took inspiration from his work with Aberdeen Youth Choir (founded in 1992) which had a similar format

== National Choirs ==
NYCOS National Choirs comprises four choirs for young people aged 10–25:

- National Youth Choir of Scotland (singers aged 16–25)
- NYCOS Training Choir (singers aged 16–19)
- NYCOS National Boys' Choir (singers aged 10–17)
- NYCOS National Girls' Choir (singers aged 12–17)

Membership for all NYCOS National Choirs is granted by annual audition and is open to singers who are born, resident/studying in Scotland, or of Scottish descent. The basis of the choirs' activities stems from a residential course where time is split between individual vocal coaching, musicianship sessions and sectional/full rehearsals.

NYCOS became the first youth organisation to win a Royal Philharmonic Society (RPS) award when the National Youth Choir of Scotland won the 2012 Ensemble prize. The Choir has toured to Ireland (2000), Sweden (2001), USA (2004), Hungary (2007), Germany (2010), Austria, Czech Republic and Slovakia (2013), USA (2016), Belgium (2017) and the USA for a third time (2018), where the ensemble performed notably alongside the Orchestre Révolutionnaire et Romantique in Carnegie Hall, under John Eliot Gardiner. NYCoS traditionally undertakes an international tour every three years (besides the exception of 2018), with those in the touring choir being offered a two-year membership. In the tour year, a second, non-touring group is formed named NYCoS Scotland.

NYCOS Training Choir, formed in 1997 trains singers aged 16–19 who need more experience in a wider repertoire, and receive vocal and choral and individual coaching.

The National Boys' Choir was formed in 2002 with financial support from the Scottish Arts Council Lottery Fund. It was initially for boys with unchanged voices, but expanded in 2003 to include a changed voices section. Entry is by audition and is open for boys aged 10–16. Structured into three sections, Training Choir, National Boys' Choir and Changing Voice Choir, the choir meets annually around Easter time for a residential course, followed by concerts. The choir has performed in Belfast, Edinburgh, Glasgow, Linlithgow, Londonderry, Paisley and Stirling. In 2007, NBC toured to Kendal and Dumfries giving concerts in Kendal Town Hall and the Crichton Church in Dumfries.

The Choir has a repertoire including classical, sacred and Scots songs. Recent commissions include Tom Cunningham's Saga of the Seven Days and Sheena Phillips' Sea Shanties. The patron of the boys choir is Scottish actor Billy Boyd.

The National Girls' Choir was formed in 2007. 80 singers between the ages of 12 and 16 were selected by audition from Scotland. The daily timetable was a mixture of vocal coaching, musicianship training and full choir rehearsals. They performed their first concert in the Queen's Hall in Edinburgh in April 2007. In 2010, the choir formed another section, the National Girls' Training Choir. It offers girls who audition successfully, but whose voices are not yet ready for National Girls' Choir, places on the National Girls' Choir course. The patron of the National Girls' Choir is Scottish mezzo-soprano Karen Cargill.

== Regional Choirs ==
In 1998 NYCOS formed two Children's Choirs (now known as Regional Choirs), one in Livingston, West Lothian and one in Edinburgh. Each choir had approximately 60 members. Members were recruited from Primary 3 pupils (with some Primary 4 to make up numbers). Both choirs met for one hour each week and members received musicianship training for 30 minutes and sang as a choir for the remaining 30 minutes. At present there are 14 Regional Choirs: Aberdeen, Angus, Dumfries, Dundee, East Dunbartonshire, Edinburgh, Falkirk, Inverness, Isle of Lewis, Midlothian, Perth, Renfrewshire, Stirling and West Lothian – with a membership of over 2,000 children. The set-up of the Regional Choirs is still the same with members receiving musicianship training and singing as a choir. End of term concerts are given at Christmas and Summer. The choirs in Perth and East Dunbartonshire are distinct in that they are boys-only choirs.

== Education ==
NYCOS has an educational remit and runs Kodály Musicianship Training weekends for teachers, choir directors and music specialists. They run in-service days and singing workshops for schools. They also run Mini Music Makers classes across Scotland, which are musical sessions designed to introduce babies, toddlers and nursery age children and their parent/carer to music.

NYCOS also produces song books and educational resources.
