= Butterfly Collectors =

1999 television film

- Genre: Thriller; Crime drama
- Written by: Paul Abbott
- Directed by: Jean Stewart
- Starring: Pete Postlethwaite; Jamie Draven; Rachel Davies; Alison Newman; Crissy Rock; Thomas Aston; Ruth Harrop; Ben Crompton
- Composers: Philip Appleby; Jocelyn Pook
- Country of origin: United Kingdom
- Original language: English
- No. of series: 1
- No. of episodes: 2

Production
- Executive producers: Simon Lewis; Susan Hogg
- Producer: Hilary Bevan Jones
- Production locations: Manchester, England, UK
- Running time: 198 minutes (including adverts)
- Production company: Granada Television

Original release
- Network: ITV
- Release: 19 April – 20 April 1999

Butterfly Collectors is a two part ITV miniseries. It was broadcast between 19 April and 20 April 1999. A two-part psychological thriller about a disillusioned policeman who develops an unlikely friendship with two teenagers arrested for murder. Butterfly Collectors was written by Paul Abbott, who has also written for many other television serials including Shameless, Clocking Off and Children's Ward. The drama stars British actor Pete Postlethwaite, who is supported by actress and comedian Crissy Rock.

In 2008, it was released on Region 1 DVD, on 4 September 2017, it was released by Strawberry Media on Region 2 DVD.
