= Kate Rutter =

English actress

- Born: Leeds, England
- Education: Rose Bruford College
- Occupation: Actress
- Years active: 1989–present
- Notable work: I, Daniel Blake; His Dark Materials; Peterloo; Oranges and Sunshine; The Arbor; Four Weddings and a Funeral; River City; Coronation Street

Kate Rutter is an English actress, best known for I, Daniel Blake, Peterloo and River City.

== Filmography ==
Year	Film	Role	Director	Notes
1997	Casualty	Jean	Various	
1997	The Full Monty	Clerk	Peter Cattaneo	
1998	Cold Feet	Sheila	Various	
1999	Hearts and Minds	Sister Mary	Charles McDougall	
2000	Queer as Folk	Mrs. Perry	Various	
2000	Fat Friends	Helen	Kay Mellor	
2002–2009	Silent Witness	Mrs. Brook	Various	
2002–2009	Holby City	Carole	Various	
2005	Pierrepoint	Eileen	Adrian Shergold	
2010	Doctors	Linda	Various	
2010	The Arbor	Mother	Clio Barnard	
2010	Oranges and Sunshine	Vera	Jim Loach	
2012–2013	River City	Miriam Stubbs	Various	Series regular, 44 episodes
2013	Scott and Bailey	Joe’s solicitor	Various	
2013	The Railway Man	Jean	Jonathan Teplitzky	
2016	DCI Banks	Maureen	Various	
2016	I, Daniel Blake	Ann	Ken Loach	
2017	Cotton Wool	Marion	Nicholas Connor	
2018	Peterloo	Reformer	Mike Leigh	
2019	Coronation Street	D.S. Beckett	Various	
2019	Four Weddings and a Funeral	Margot	Various	
2019	His Dark Materials	Sister Betty	Various	
2020	Question Time	Herself	Rob Hopkin	
2024	Truelove	Barbara	Chloë Wicks and Carl Tibbetts	3 episodes

== Personal life ==
Kate Rutter was born and raised in Leeds, Yorkshire, she trained as an actress at Rose Bruford College in Sidcup, Southeast London and began her career in 1977 working on various productions for Yorkshire Playhouse under director Phil Young. Her first television appearance was in 1994 in series Earthfasts by William Mayne. Since then Kate has appeared as a series regular in both ITV's Coronation Street and BBC's River City. In 2020, Kate Rutter's appearance in the audience of the BBC's Question Time sparked controversy over whether the actress was hired by the BBC.

== Awards and nominations ==
Award	Category	Nominated work	Result
Los Angeles Film Awards	Best Ensemble	Cotton Wool	Won
New York Film Awards	Best Ensemble	Cotton Wool	Won
