= Leanne Best =

English actress (born 1979)

- Born: 15 June 1979 (age 47); Liverpool, Merseyside, England
- Education: Liverpool Institute for Performing Arts
- Occupation: Actress
- Years active: 2003–present
- Relatives: Pete Best (uncle)

Leanne Best (born 15 June 1979) is an English actress. She trained at the Liverpool Institute for Performing Arts and presently lives in southwest London.

She is known for her roles as Jane Cobden in the BBC series Ripper Street, Celia Donnelly in Fortitude, and the title role of 'The Woman In Black' in the 2014 film The Woman in Black 2: Angel of Death. Best also appeared as Min Sakul in the sequel Star Wars: The Force Awakens (2015).

More recently Best appeared in ITV comedy series Cold Feet in September 2016 as Tina Reynolds. She was also in Line of Duty series 3 and in an episode of Ted Lasso as Jamie Tartt’s mum.

== Filmography ==
=== Film ===
Year	Title	Role	Notes
2009	The Be All and End All	Krystal	
2014	The Woman in Black: Angel of Death	The Woman in Black	
2015	Star Wars: The Force Awakens	Min Sakul	
2016	Native	Awan	
2016	Closer	Girlfriend	Short film
2016	The Infiltrator	Bowling Alley Waitress	
2017	Film Stars Don't Die in Liverpool	Eileen	
2017	Cotton Wool	Rachel	Short film
2019	Little Joe	Mother (Brittany)	
2021	Harm	The Woman	
2023	Bolan's Shoes	Penny / Sadie	
2023	Raging Grace	Katherine	
2023	Black Dog	(unknown)	
2023	Our Kid	Sarah	
2023	Vincent and Agostina	Agostina Segatori	Short film
2024	Sebastian	Dionne	
2028	The Beatles – A Four-Film Cinematic Event	Mimi Smith	

=== Television ===
Year	Title	Role	Notes
2004	Casualty	Karen Jablon	Episode: "Love and Loathing"
2005	Wire in the Blood	Terri	Episode: "Bad Seed"
2005	Heatwave	Loz Garett	Television film
2007	New Street Law	Claudia Hartson	Episode #2.2
2007	Mobile	Barmaid	Mini-series; 2 episodes
2009	Moving On	Leslie	Episode: "Dress to Impress"
2010	Doctors	Sam Bridges	Episode: "A Child Called Moon"
2011	Doctors	Colette Coleman	Episode: "Future Perfect"
2012	Stepping Up	Samantha	Episode: "Home Games"
2012	Good Cop	Emma Pearson	Mini-series; episode 3
2013	Lucan	Sandra Rivett	Mini-series; 2 episodes
2013–2014	Ripper Street	Jane Cobden	Series 2 & 3; 10 episodes
2014	Salting the Battlefield	Amber Page	Television film
2014	Shetland	Annabel	Episode: "Dead Water: Part 2"
2014	The Driver	Sarah	Mini-series; episode 1
2014	New Tricks	Zoe Baines	Episode: "The English Defence"
2015	Fortitude	Celia Donnelly	6 episodes
2015	The Outcast	Jeanie Lee	Mini-series; 2 episodes
2015	From Darkness	Julie Hind	Mini-series; 4 episodes
2015–2016	Home Fires	Teresa Fenchurch	Series 1 & 2; 12 episodes
2016	The Nightmare Worlds of H. G. Wells	Eveline Coombes	Mini-series; episode 4: "The Purple Pileus"
2016	Line of Duty	PC Jackie Brickford	3 episodes
2016	Undercover	Abigail Strickland	Mini-series; 4 episodes
2016	Black Mirror	Penny	Episode: "Shut Up and Dance"
2016–2017	Cold Feet	Tina Reynolds	Main cast. Series 6 & 7; 15 episodes
2017	The Good Karma Hospital	Debbie Smart	2 episodes
2017	Babs	Rose Deeks	Television film
2017–2020	Tin Star	Helen Brown	Recurring role. 5 episodes
2019	Do Not Disturb	Mum	Episode: "Child's Play"
2019	I Am...	Ava	Episode: "I Am Nicola"
2019	Carnival Row	Madame Moira	4 episodes
2020	Isolation Stories	Karen	Mini-series; episode 4: "Karen"
2020–2022	Young Wallander	Frida Rask	Seasons 1 & 2; 12 episodes
2021	Close to Me	Anna	Mini-series; 6 episodes
2022	Four Lives	Kate	Mini-series; 3 episodes
2022	Compulsion	Jenny Challoner	4 episodes
2022	The Walk-In	Alison	Mini-series; 5 episodes
2023	A Town Called Malice	D.I. Lindsay	6 episodes
2023	Ted Lasso	Georgie Tartt	Episode: "Mom City"
2024	The Bay	Julie Ashworth	6 episodes
2024	Insomnia	Phoebe Bornett	6 episodes
2024–present	G'wed	Jodie	12 episodes
2025–present	This City Is Ours	Lesley Williams	5 episodes
2026	A Woman of Substance	Adele Fairley	5 episodes

== Awards and nominations ==
Year	Award	Category	Nominated work	Result
2012	TMA Awards	Best Performance	The Matchbox	Nominated
2017	TV Times Awards	Best Newcomer	Cold Feet	Nominated
2018	Out of the Can Film Festival	Special Achievement Award - For Contribution to Film and TV	—N/a	Won
2018	Los Angeles Film Awards	Best Actress	Cotton Wool	Won
2018	Los Angeles Film Awards (Annual Ceremony)	Best Actress of 2019	Cotton Wool	Nominated
2018	European Independent Film Awards	Best Actress	Cotton Wool	Won
2018	New York Film Awards	Best Actress	Cotton Wool	Nominated
2018	New York Film Awards	Best Duo (with Crissy Rock)	Cotton Wool	Nominated
2018	Manchester Screenplays and Shorts Film Festival	Best Actress	Cotton Wool	Won
2018	Unrestricted View Film Festival	Best Actress	Cotton Wool	Won
2018	New Renaissance Film Festival	Best Actress	Cotton Wool	Nominated
2018	The Monthly Film Festival	Best Actress	Cotton Wool	Won
