= 2013 British Academy Scotland New Talent Awards =

- Date: 21 March 2013
- Site: Oran Mor; Glasgow; Scotland
- Hosted by: Muriel Gray

Television coverage
- Network: Streaming webcast

The 2013 British Academy Scotland New Talent Awards were held on 21 March 2013 at the Oran Mor in Glasgow. Presented by BAFTA Scotland, the accolades honour the best upcoming talent in the field of film and television in Scotland. The Nominees were announced on 7 March 2013. The ceremony was hosted by Muriel Gray.

== Winners and nominees ==
Winners are listed first and highlighted in boldface.

Best Fiction Film	Best Acting Performance
**Ahora, No**: Little Brother; Radiance	**Daniel Kerr – The Wee Man as Young Paul Ferris**: Sophie Gane – Aurora as Bailie; George Wallace – The Happy Lands as Dan Guthrie
Best Writer	Best Entertainment Programme
**Rory Alexander Stewart – Liar**: Nick Rowland – Dancing In The Ashes; Sam Ferguson – One New Message	**The State of Greenock – Gavin Grant, David Newman, Pamela Barnes**: It's Only A Movie – Ewan Denny, Kimberley Looi; I'm A Gardner – Adam Borys, Ruben Partington, Thomas Ross
Best Director of Photography	Best Editor
**Alan C. McLaughlin – Lost Serenity**: Ranald Wood - Sawney: Flesh of Man; John Young - Let's Go Swimming	**Simone Smith – Red**: Douglas King – Let's Go Swimming; Nick Gibbon – Pablo's Winter
Best Factual	Best Original Music
**Everyone's Child – Garry Fraser, Aimara Reques**: Pablo's Winter – Chico Pereira; Pouter – Paul Fegen	**Chris Bradley – Killer**: Francis MacDonald – The Lost Purse; Rory McIntyre – Catching Light
Best Sound Design	Best Game
**Pier Daniel Cornacchia, Ana Irina Roman – Lost Serenity**: David Meikle, Simone Smith – Red; Pier Daniel Cornacchia, Lukaz Kulec, Florian Schwarz– Deep Dark Pale Blue	**Mr Montgomery's Debonair Facial Hair – Ronan Quigley, Nikita Bewley, Ellis Armstrong, Charlie McFadden, Stuart Martin, Alex Hopkins, Allan Robertson**: Fuaim – Paul Andrew McGee, Emily Green; The Rig – Michael Ritchie, Mikkel Rasmussen, Alice Thorntonsmith, Kyle Drysdale, George Johnstone, Aaron Darmudas, Kyle Erwin
Best Animation
**Hannah and the Moon – Kate Charter, Joseph Atkinson**: Apron Strings – Craig Kirk; I Love You So Hard – Ross Butter

=== Special Award for New Work ===
- Hannah and the Moon

== See also ==
- 2013 British Academy Scotland Awards
