= Simone Smith (British film editor) =

Scottish film director and visual artist

- Born: Glasgow, Scotland
- Occupation: Film director
- Years active: 2012–present
- Notable work: The Rinsing; Red; Slap; The Möbius Trip

Simone Smith is a Scottish film director and visual artist from Glasgow. Her independent short film SLAP was nominated for a BAFTA in 2019, and her film RED earned her the Best Editor accolade at the 2013 British Academy Scotland New Talent Awards. Smith's latest short film THE MOBIUS TRIP premiered at the Glasgow Short Film Festival in March 2023, and won the Jury Special Mention award for its "radicalism", and "strong adventurous cinematic vision". Official selections include Academy-qualifying Hollyshorts Film Festival, Edinburgh International Film Festival, Chicago Underground Film Festival and Encounters Film Festival. Further notable wins include the UK Special Mention at Encounters International Film Festival, Best Film at Torino Underground Cinefest, Best Experimental at Arizona Underground, the Grand Jury Award at Chicago Underground Film Festival, and longlisted for Best British Short at the British Independent Film Awards. She was named a Rising Star by Screen International and has two feature films in development with BFI Network and Screen Scotland: IT'S TOO LATE YOU CAN'T SAVE ME and UNTIL SHE BLEEDS.

== Filmography ==
Year	Film	Credited as				Notes
Year	Film	Director	Editor	Producer	Writer	Notes
2012	RED	Yes	Yes	Yes	Yes	Short Film
2013	THE RINSING	Yes	Yes	Yes	Yes	Short Film
2017	XX	Yes	Yes	Yes	Yes	Short Film
2018	SLAP	Yes	Yes	Yes	Yes	Short Film
2023	THE MöBIUS TRIP	Yes	Yes	Yes	Yes	Short Film

== Awards and nominations ==
Year	Nominated Work	Awards	Category	Result
2013	Red	British Academy Scotland New Talent Awards	Best Editor	Won
2013	Red	British Academy Scotland New Talent Awards	Best Sound Design	Nominee
2015	THE RINSING	Shorts On Tap	Audience Award	Won
2019	SLAP	Southside Film Festival	Audience Award	Won
2019	SLAP	BAFTA Scotland Awards	Best Film	Nominee
2019	SLAP	Glasgow Short Film Festival	Jury Special Mention	Won
2023	THE MÖBIUS TRIP	Glasgow Short Film Festival	Jury Special Mention	Won
2023	THE MÖBIUS TRIP	Chicago Underground Film Festival	Grand Jury Award	Won
2023	THE MÖBIUS TRIP	Arizona Underground Film Festival	Best Experimental Short	Won
2023	THE MÖBIUS TRIP	Encounters Film Festival	UK Award Special Mention	Won
2023	THE MÖBIUS TRIP	Torino Underground Cinefest	Best Editing	Won
2023	THE MÖBIUS TRIP	Torino Underground Cinefest	Best Film	Won
2023	THE MÖBIUS TRIP	Interfilm Berlin	Best Sound Design	Won
2023	THE MÖBIUS TRIP	Sin City Horror Fest	Best Editing	Won
2024	THE MÖBIUS TRIP	London Short Film Festival	Best British Short	Nominee
2024	THE MÖBIUS TRIP	Art Film Spirt Awards	Best Director	Won
2024	THE MÖBIUS TRIP	Si-Fan Film Festival	Best Scottish Short	Won
2024	THE MÖBIUS TRIP	Final Girls Berlin	Best Midnight Movie	Won
2024	THE MÖBIUS TRIP	Norwich Film Festival	Best British Short	Nominee

== See also ==
- 2013 British Academy Scotland New Talent Awards
- 2018 British Academy Scotland Awards
