= Gone Fishing (2008 film) =

- DVD Cover
- Directed by: Chris Jones
- Written by: Chris Jones
- Produced by: Ivan Francis Clements
- Starring: Bill Paterson; James Wilson
- Cinematography: Vernon Layton
- Edited by: Eddie Hamilton
- Release date: 2008
- Running time: 13 minutes
- Country: United Kingdom
- Language: English
- Budget: £25,000 (estimated)

Gone Fishing is a 2008 short film written and directed by Chris Jones, starring Bill Paterson and James Wilson, that premiered at BAFTA on 12 January 2008.

== Plot ==
"Gone Fishing" is the story of a boy and old man coming to terms with bereavement through their shared love of fishing, and the legend of Goliath, the biggest pike ever caught.

This thirteen-minute short film was financed by 150 film makers and directed by the author of The Guerilla Film Makers Handbook, Chris Jones.

The story is in part autobiographical - while growing up, director Chris Jones and his friends would often attempt to catch the legendary 'Oscar the pike', a fish that according to local myth terrorized the lake at the end of his road, the aptly named Blue Lagoon. This was the inspiration behind the legend of 'Goliath', the big fish in this even bigger tale.

== Awards ==
Gone Fishing won 35 prizes at the film festival circuit including the Grand Prize at the 2008 Bahamas International Film Festival, and the 2008 Rhode Island International Film Festival, and it won the Grand Jury Prize at the 2009 Edmonton International Film Festival. At the 2009 Beverly Hills Film Festival and the 2009 Method Fest Independent Film Festival it took home the Audience Award, and it received the Golden Honu Award at the 2009 Big Island Film Festival. Gone Fishing further won both the Director's Choice Award and the Audience Award at the 2009 Sedona Film Festival, the Achievement Award for screenwriting at the 2009 Newport Beach Film Festival, and the prizes for Best Short at both the 2009 Indianapolis International Film Festival and the 2009 Palm Beach International Film Festival, as well as receiving the prize for Best Narrative Short by the Producers Guild of America. The film was among the final 10 long-listed shorts for the 2009 Academy Awards.
