= White Angel (1993 film) =

- Theatrical release poster
- Directed by: Chris Jones
- Written by: Geneviève Jolliffe; Chris Jones
- Produced by: Geneviève Jolliffe
- Starring: Peter Firth; Harriet Robinson; Don Henderson
- Cinematography: Jon Walker
- Edited by: John Holland
- Music by: Harry Gregson-Williams
- Production company: Living Spirit Pictures
- Distributed by: Pilgrim Entertainment
- Release dates: November 15, 1993 (London Film Festival); April 15, 1994 (United Kingdom)
- Running time: 96 minutes
- Country: United Kingdom
- Language: English

White Angel is a 1993 British thriller film directed by Chris Jones and starring Harriet Robinson, Peter Firth and Don Henderson.

== Premise ==
A crime writer is approached by a serial killer who wishes her to tell his story to the world.

== Cast ==
- Harriet Robinson as Ellen Carter
- Peter Firth as Leslie Steckler
- Don Henderson as Inspector Taylor
- Catherine Arton as Mik
- Harry Miller as Alan Smith
- Joe Collins as Graham
- Caroline Staunton as Mrs. Steckler
- Mark Stevens as Carter's husband
- Inez Thorn as Dezerae
- Suzanne Sinclair as Forensics expert
- Jade Hansbury as Alan Smith's daughter
- Chris Sullivan as Bank Manager
- Ken Sharrock as Bank Teller
- Genevieve Jolliffe as Director

== Release ==
The film was given the Centrepiece slot at the London Film Festival on 15 November 1993. It was released on 14 screens across the UK on 15 April 1994 as Pilgrim Entertainment's first release and grossed £23,621 in its opening weekend.
