= Crissy Rock =

English actress and comedian

- Born: Christine Murray; 23 September 1958 (age 68); Liverpool, England
- Occupations: Actress; comedian
- Years active: 1987–present
- Television: Benidorm (2007–2012, 2015); I'm a Celebrity... (2011)
- Spouses: Philip Shaw (m. 1975; div. 1983) Second husband (m. 1989; div. 2005) Julian Buck (m. 2018; sep. 2025)
- Children: 2

Christine Murray (born 23 September 1958), known professionally as Crissy Rock, is an English actress, stand-up comedian, and author, most notable for her role as Maggie Conlan in the 1994 film Ladybird, Ladybird, and as Janey York in Benidorm.

She appeared in I'm a Celebrity...Get Me Out of Here! 2011. In December 2012, she appeared on Celebrity Come Dine with Me. For her performance in Ladybird, Ladybird, she won the Silver Bear for Best Actress award at the 44th Berlin International Film Festival.

== Early life ==
Rock was born Christine Murray, the daughter of Eddie and Margaret Murray, at Sefton General Hospital in Liverpool. Rock spent her early years living with her parents and siblings in her maternal grandparents' flat in Toxteth; Rock was sexually abused by her grandfather from the age of eight. In 1969, Rock appeared on stage with the Diddy Men, and attended dance school for two years.

== Career ==
=== Stage ===
Rock started her career as a comedian in the late 1980s. She appeared on Bob Monkhouse's BBC Television show Bob Says Opportunity Knocks,

By 1993, her career had started to take off. She performed her act in clubs in Blackpool, Newcastle, Birmingham, Leeds, Sheffield, Cardiff, and London. By 1994, Rock was bill-topping at the Central Pier and the Blackpool Tower.

In 1998, Rock toured the United Kingdom in a drama called Shellfish, in which she played the role of the pivotal female role of Pat. The Guardian newspaper wrote: "Pat is an utterly believable portrayal of a woman making a last grab at happiness".

Following the success of the TV show Benidorm she returned to the UK in 2008 and continued to perform her stand-up act in clubs around the country.

In 2011, Rock released her debut DVD: Crissy Rock – Live!, recorded at Liverpool's Royal Court Theatre. From December 2011 to January 2012, Rock played the role of the Fairy godmother in Billingham Forum's Christmas pantomime production of Cinderella. Followed by 'From Benidorm To The Jungle And Back released in 2013. Her latest DVD 'Live 2022' was released March 2023.

In December 2013, Rock appeared as the Wicked Queen in a production of Snow White at Liverpool's Epstein Theatre.

On 15 March 2014, Rock led the cast of new comedy Dirty Dusting at the Bedworth Civic Hall. In April 2014, Rock starred alongside Duggie Brown in Escorts the musical at the Theatre Royal St Helens.

=== Film and television ===
Rock's debut acting performance was as Maggie Conlan in Ken Loach's award-winning 1994 film Ladybird, Ladybird. Loach later recalled: "I cannot think of anyone I have worked with who shines more brightly than Crissy Rock". Her performance won her numerous awards, including 'Best Actress' at the Berlin Film Festival, 'Best Actress' at London Film Critics Awards, and she received a 'Best Newcomer' nomination in the Evening Standard Awards.

In 1995, Rock appeared on primetime ITV in Peak Practice, Celebrity Squares and Funny Girls. She also performed on Sky One's Stand and Deliver. In 1996, she played Annie Greave in episode three of the BBC detective drama Dalziel and Pascoe, had a regular television role as nosy neighbour Anita Cartledge in Springhill, and starred alongside Julie Walters and Robert Lindsay in the BBC comedy play Brazen Hussies.

In 1997, she played alongside Billie Whitelaw in the six-part BBC1 series Born to Run. She also made regular appearances on Channel 4's game show Pull The Other One. In 1999, Rock played alongside Pete Postlethwaite in the BBC crime drama Butterfly Collectors, Nancy Banks-Smith who, writing in The Guardian said: “Crissy Rock..just switch her on and watch her go”. This was the first of two plays in which she featured in that year; the other was as Jean Walton in Jimmy McGovern's BAFTA-nominated Channel 4 play Dockers, with Ken Stott and Ricky Tomlinson. In the same year, she was acclaimed for her presenting debut on BBC TV's Millennium Night Show with Michael Parkinson and Gaby Roslin.

In 2000, she played the regular role of the unnamed newsagent in the BBC One drama series Clocking Off. In 2001, Rock starred as Amber Costello during a four-week stint in Channel 4's soap opera Brookside. In 2002, she worked with Ricky Tomlinson again when she played Madame Flo in his six-part BBC series Nice Guy Eddie. She also starred in a short film called Hero, which won the Hamburg and Dresden International Festivals in three categories, also the London International Film Festival for short subjects.

Following a five-year retirement from acting, Rock was cast, without audition, in the two part Closure episode of Lynda La Plante's Trial & Retribution series for ITV in 2007. The following year, Plante cast her in another of her TV productions: The Commander.

In 2006, Rock took on the role of loudmouthed hotel manageress Janey York in ITV's sitcom Benidorm. She left the show in 2011, although she returned in Episode 6 of Series 5 for a cameo role, and then again for two episodes of Series 7 in 2015. In 2012, Rock filmed "The Air That I Breathe", based on the 1970s TV series Hazell. Over the years, she has appeared in various feature films, including Under the Skin, with Samantha Morton, Act of Grace, in which she played Leo Gregory's mother, and A Boy Called Dad. She is currently filming three new films: In Search Of The Miraculous, Death Of An Angel and Still Waters.

=== I'm a Celebrity...Get Me Out of Here! ===
Rock took part in the 11th series of I'm a Celebrity...Get Me Out of Here!. She came 6th and left on Day 19. On 8 December 2011, days after returning from Australia, she appeared on Gabby Logan's Channel 5 show Live with Gabby in which she reflected on her 19 days in the jungle, her weight loss and her DVD.

=== Publications ===
Rock published her autobiography, This Heart Within Me Burns, in 2011. The book, ghostwritten by author Ken Scott, was a bestseller in Britain, and Rock went on a book signing tour to promote it. The sales for the hardback edition hit 35,000, and it was subsequently released in paperback. This Heart Within Me Burns was described as "an inspirational piece of literature".

Encouraged by this success, Rock teamed up with Ken Scott again to pen the first of a series of novels centring on fictional journalist Samantha Kerr. The first book, Revenge Is Sweeter Than Flowing Honey, was published in February 2014. Ken Scott has recently written: "Look out for more Sam Kerr in the not too distant future", suggesting that there are more books in the pipeline.

== Personal life ==
After the death of her grandfather who subjected her to years of sexual abuse, aged sixteen Rock was raped by the relative of a neighbour, which resulted in her getting pregnant. Shortly after, she began dating Philip Shaw whom she married in 1975 to help mask the fact she was pregnant. Shaw subjected Rock to years of physical and mental abuse, including attempted drowning, and he pushed a pregnant Rock down the stairs of their marital home resulting in her giving birth at six months pregnant.

Rock divorced Shaw in 1983, and in 1989, she married her second husband, who is not named in her autobiography. Rock's second husband became a chronic alcoholic resulting in Rock having to be his carer; the marriage subsequently ended in divorce. In 2018, Rock married Julian Buck, whom she had met in the garden of a hotel whilst filming Benidorm; in 2025, Rock announced via social media that she and Buck had separated.

== Stage and screen credits ==
=== Film ===
Year	Title	Role	Notes
1994	Ladybird, Ladybird	Maggie Conlan	
1997	Under the Skin	Compere	
2008	Act of Grace	Carla	
2009	A Boy Called Dad	Chip Shop Woman	
2011	3 Mile Radius	Maggie	Short film
2012	Acceptance	Jean	
2015	Angel	Auntie	
2016	Violence Breeds Violence	Audrey	Short film
2017	Cotton Wool	Gerry	Short film
2018	Fighter from the Docks	Nin	
2022	Kate & Jake	Auntie Jean	

=== Television ===
Year	Title	Role
1995, 2000	Peak Practice	Marion Daley / Marion Richards
1996	Springhill	Anita Cartlege
1996	Dalziel and Pascoe	Annie Greave
1996	Brazen Hussies	Sandra Delaney
1997	Born to Run	Edna
1999	Butterfly Collectors	Maureen
1999	Dockers	Jean Walton
2000	Clocking Off	Newsagent
2001	Brookside	Amber Costello
2002	Nice Guy Eddie	Madame Flo
2007	Trial & Retribution	Sylvia Ryan
2007–2011, 2012 & 2015	Benidorm	Janey York; 31 episodes
2008	The Commander	Adele Davis
2019	Matopulas	Barbra Jones

=== Non-fiction Television ===
Year	Title
2011	I'm a Celebrity...Get Me Out of Here!
2012	Celebrity Come Dine with Me
2013	The Chase
2019	Celebs on the Farm
2020	Celebrity Masterchef

=== Stage ===
Year	Title	Role	Venue
1998	Shellfish	Pat	UK tour (various locations)
2002-2003	Cinderella	Fairy Godmother	Royal Court, Liverpool
2003-2004	Cinderella	Fairy Godmother	Theatre Royal, St Helens
2007-2008	Cinderella	Fairy Godmother	Royal Court, Liverpool
2011-2012	Cinderella	Fairy Godmother	Forum Theatre, Billingham
2013-2014	Snow White	Wicked Queen	Epstein Theatre, Liverpool
2014	Dirty Dusting	Gladys	Bedworth Civic Hall/UK Tour
2014	Escorts the Musical	Liz Lovitt	Theatre Royal, St Helens
2014–2015	Cinderella	Fairy Godmother	Stockport Plaza
2015–2016	Cinderella	Fairy Godmother	Theatre Royal, St Helens
2017	Seriously Dead	Thelma Henderson	Crewe Lyceum
2017–2018	Sleeping Beauty	Evil Queen	Brindley Theatre, Runcorn
2019–2020	Cinderella	Fairy Godmother	Epstein Theatre, Liverpool
2021–2022	Jack and the Beanstalk	Spirit of the Beans	Ellesmere Port Civic
2021–2022	Menopause The Musical	Earth Mother	UK tour (various locations)
2022	Rita, Sue and Bob Too!	Mother	Theatre Royal, St Helens
2023	Jack and the Beanstalk	Cowella Daville	Empire Theatre, Consett
2023	Rita, Sue and Bob Too!	Mother	Epstein Theatre, Liverpool

== Releases ==
=== Bibliography ===
- Rock, Crissy; Scott, Ken (ghostwriter) (2011). This Heart Within Me Burns From Bedlam to Benidorm. London: John Blake Publishing Ltd.

=== DVDs ===
- Crissy Rock: Live from the Royal Court (2010)
- Crissy Rock: From Benidorm to the jungle and back (2011)
- Crissy Rock: Live (2022)
