= George Fenton discography =

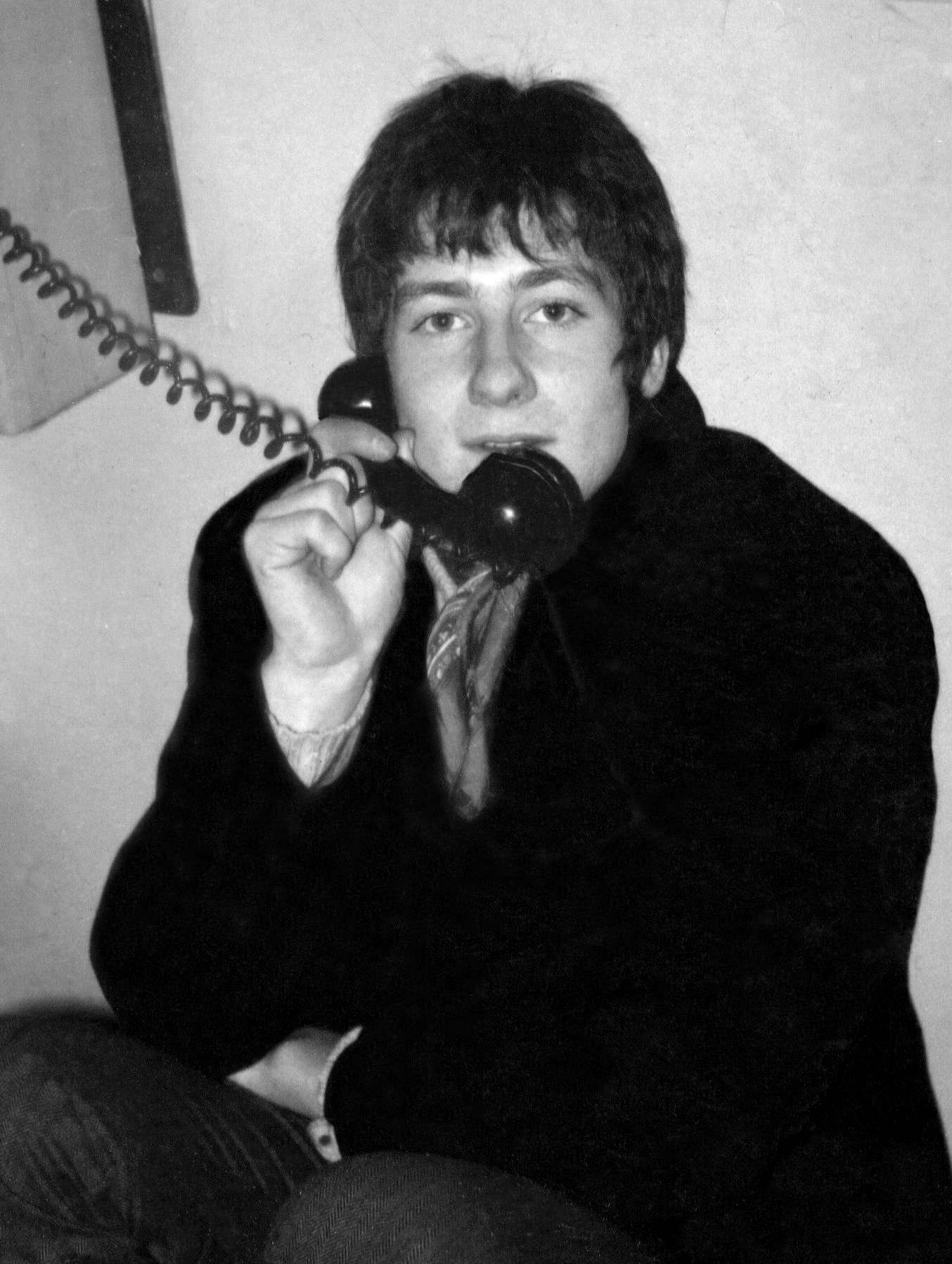
George Fenton

George Richard Ian Howe Fenton (1949–2026) was an English composer who was known for writing film scores and music for television. He frequently collaborated with the directors Richard Attenborough, Nora Ephron, Alastair Fothergill, Stephen Frears, Nicholas Hytner, Ken Loach, Andy Tennant, Neil Jordan and Terry Gilliam.

== Film scores ==
Year	Title	Director	Studio(s)	Notes
1971	Private Road	Barney Platts-Mills		
1977	A Lustful Lady	Hal E. Woode		Short film
1978	Me! I'm Afraid of Virginia Woolf	Stephen Frears		Television film
1978	Doris and Doreen	Stephen Frears		Television film
1978	The Waterloo Bridge Handicap	Ross Cramer		Short film
1979	Afternoon Off	Stephen Frears		Television film
1980	Bloody Kids	Stephen Frears		
1980	Hussy	Matthew Chapman	First Run Features	
1980	Rain on the Roof	Alan Bridges	Pennies From Heaven Ltd.	Television film
1980	The Tumour Principle	Arthur Ellis	NFTS	Short film
1980	Dead End	Alan Birkinshaw		Short film
1981	No Country for Old Men	Tristram Powell		Television film
1982	Gandhi	Richard Attenborough	Columbia Pictures	
1982	Walter	Stephen Frears		Television film
1982	Parole	Michael Tuchner		Television film
1983	Walter and June	Stephen Frears		Television film
1983	Runners	Charles Sturridge		
1983	Saigon: Year of the Cat	Stephen Frears		Television film
1983	An Englishman Abroad	John Schlesinger		Television film
1984	The Company of Wolves	Neil Jordan	ITC Entertainment	
1985	Past Caring	Richard Eyre		Television film
1986	Clockwise	Christopher Morahan	Universal Pictures	
1987	84 Charing Cross Road	David Jones	Columbia Pictures	
1987	Billy the Kid and the Green Baize Vampire	Alan Clarke	ITC Entertainment	
1987	Cry Freedom	Richard Attenborough	Universal Pictures	
1987	White Mischief	Michael Radford	Columbia Pictures	
1988	A Handful of Dust	Charkes Sturridge	New Line Cinema	
1988	High Spirits	Neil Jordan	Palace Pictures	
1988	Dangerous Liaisons	Stephen Frears	Warner Bros. Pictures	
1988	The Dressmaker	Jim O'Brien	Euro American Pictures	
1989	We're No Angels	Neil Jordan	Paramount Pictures	
1990	Memphis Belle	Michael Caton-Jones	Warner Bros. Pictures	
1990	The Long Walk Home	Richard Pearce	Miramax Films	
1990	White Palace	Luis Mandoki	Universal Pictures	
1991	The Fisher King	Terry Gilliam	TriStar Pictures	
1992	Final Analysis	Phil Joanou	Warner Bros. Pictures	
1992	Hero	Stephen Frears	Columbia Pictures	
1993	Groundhog Day	Harold Ramis	Columbia Pictures	
1993	Born Yesterday	Luis Mandoki	Hollywood Pictures	
1993	Shadowlands	Richard Attenborough	Savoy Pictures	
1994	China Moon	John Mailey	Orion Pictures	
1994	Ladybird, Ladybird	Ken Loach	Samuel Goldwyn Company	
1994	Mixed Nuts	Nora Ephron	TriStar Pictures	
1995	Land and Freedom	Ken Loach	Gramercy Pictures	
1996	Mary Reilly	Stephen Frears	TriStar Pictures	
1996	Heaven's Prisoners	Phil Joanou	New Line Cinema	
1996	Multiplicity	Harold Ramis	Columbia Pictures	
1996	Carla's Song	Ken Loach	Universal Pictures	
1996	The Crucible	Nicholas Hytner	20th Century Fox	
1996	In Love and War	Richard Attenborough	New Line Cinema	
1997	The Woodlanders	Phil Agland		
1998	Dangerous Beauty	Marshall Herskovitz	Warner Bros. Pictures; 20th Century Fox	
1998	The Object of My Affection	Nicholas Hytner	20th Century Fox	
1998	My Name Is Joe	Ken Loach	Artisan Entertainment	
1998	Ever After	Andy Tennant	20th Century Fox	
1998	Living Out Loud	Richard LaGravenese	New Line Cinema	
1998	You've Got Mail	Nora Ephron	Warner Bros. Pictures	
1999	Entropy	Phil Joanou	Warner Bros. Pictures	
1999	Grey Owl	Richard Attenborough	20th Century Fox	
1999	Anna and the King	Andy Tennant	20th Century Fox	
2000	Bread and Roses	Ken Loach	Lionsgate	
2000	Center Stage	Nicholas Hytner	Columbia Pictures	
2000	Lucky Numbers	Nora Ephron	Paramount Pictures	
2001	Summer Catch	Mike Tollin	Warner Bros. Pictures	
2001	The Navigators	Ken Loach		
2002	Sweet Sixteen	Ken Loach	Icon Film Distribution	
2002	Sweet Home Alabama	Andy Tennant	Touchstone Pictures	
2003	Imagining Argentina	Christopher Hampton	Arenas Entertainment	
2003	Deep Blue	Alastair Fothergill; Andy Byatt	Miramax Films	
2004	Ae Fond Kiss...	Ken Loach	Icon Film Distribution	
2004	Stage Beauty	Richard Eyre	Lionsgate	
2005	Hitch	Andy Tennant	Columbia Pictures	
2005	Tickets	Ermanno Olmi; Abbas Kiarostami; Ken Loach		
2005	Valiant	Gary Chapman	Buena Vista Pictures	
2005	Bewitched	Nora Ephron	Columbia Pictures	
2005	Mrs Henderson Presents	Stephen Frears	Pathé; The Weinstein Company	
2006	Last Holiday	Wayne Wang	Paramount Pictures	
2006	The Wind That Shakes the Barley	Ken Loach	Pathé; IFC First Take	
2006	The History Boys	Nicholas Hytner	Fox Searchlight Pictures	
2007	Earth	Alastair Fothergill; Mark Linfield	Walt Disney Studios Motion Pictures	
2007	It's a Free World...	Ken Loach		
2008	Fool's Gold	Andy Tennant	Warner Bros. Pictures	
2009	Looking for Eric	Ken Loach	Icon Film Distribution	
2010	The Bounty Hunter	Andy Tennant	Columbia Pictures	
2010	Route Irish	Ken Loach	Sixteen Films; Why Not Productions; Wild Bunch	
2011	One Life	Michael Gunton; Martha Holmes	Magic Light Pictures	
2012	The Angels' Share	Ken Loach	Entertainment One	
2013	The Spirit of '45	Ken Loach		
2013	Muhammad Ali's Greatest Fight	Stephen Frears	HBO Films	
2013	The Zero Theorem	Terry Gilliam	Stage 6 Films	
2014	Bears	Alastair Fothergill; Keith Scholey	Disneynature	
2014	Jimmy's Hall	Ken Loach	Entertainment One	
2015	Absolutely Anything	Terry Jones	Lionsgate	
2015	The Lady in the Van	Nicholas Hytner	TriStar Pictures	
2016	I, Daniel Blake	Ken Loach	eOne Films	
2016	Wild Oats	Andy Tennant	The Weinstein Company; RADiUS-TWC	
2017	Woman Walks Ahead	Susanna White	A24; DirecTV Cinema	
2018	Red Joan	Trevor Nunn	Lionsgate	
2019	Cold Pursuit	Hans Petter Moland	Summit Entertainment	
2019	Sorry We Missed You	Ken Loach		
2020	The Secret: Dare to Dream	Andy Tennant		
2021	The United Way	Mat Hodgson	Ad Hoc Films; Cantilever Media; Embankment Films; Ingenious Media; Maddem Films	
2021	The Duke	Roger Michell	Pathé; Ingenious Media; Neon Films; Screen Yorkshire	
2022	Allelujah	Richard Eyre	Pathé; Ingenious Media; BBC Films; DJ Films; Redstart Media	
2022	Elizabeth: A Portrait in Parts	Roger Michell	Ingenious Media; Free Range Films	
2023	The Old Oak	Ken Loach	Le Pacte; StudioCanal	
2024	Unit 234	Andy Tennant	Brainstorm Media	
2025	The Choral	Nicholas Hytner	Sony Pictures Classics	
2026	Up Against It	Trudie Styler		Final film score
