= List of awards and nominations received by George Fenton =

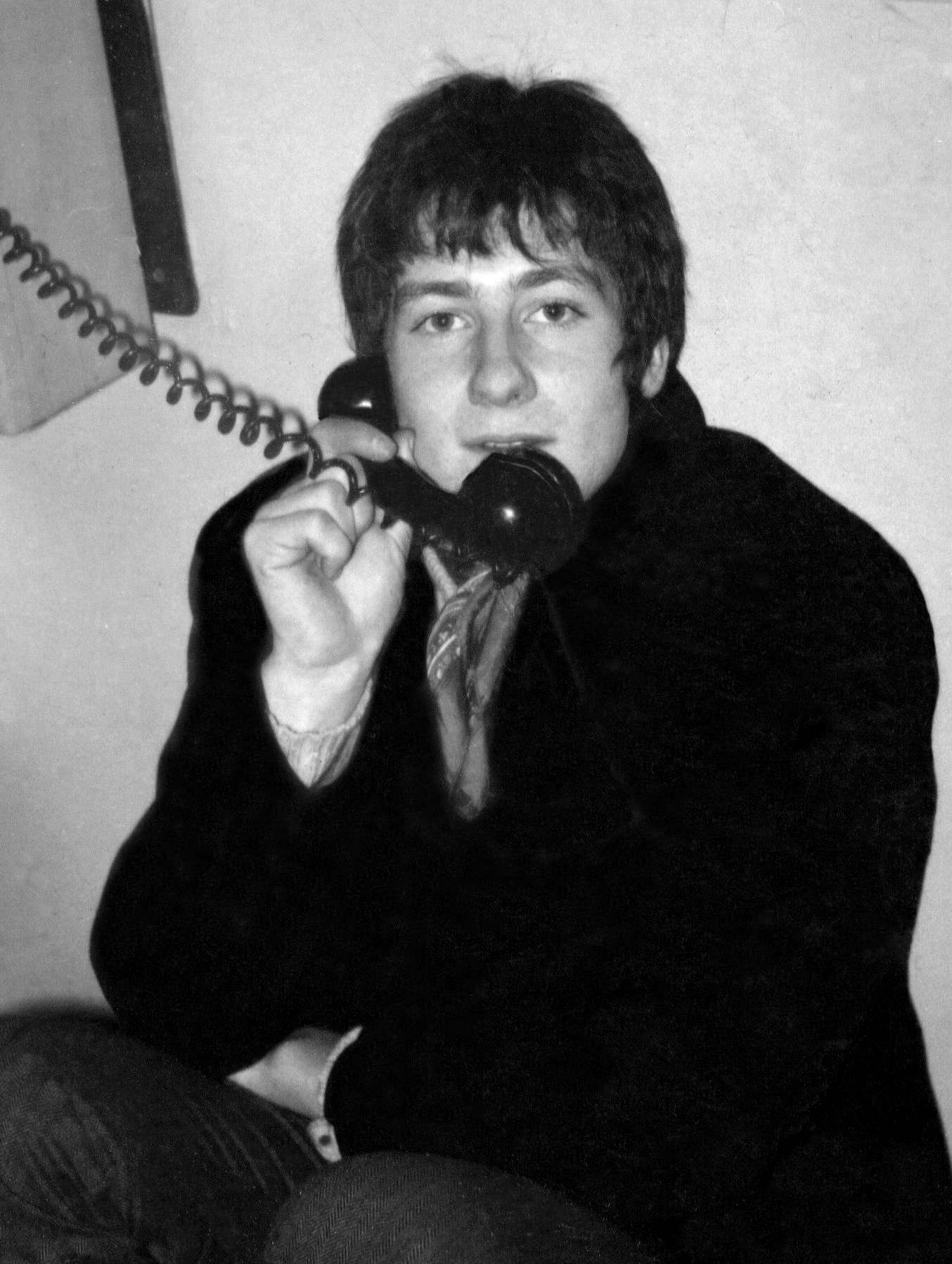
George Fenton

English composer George Fenton has received various awards and nominations. He was the recipient of three BAFTA Awards and two Emmy Awards. He also won five BMI Awards and was honored with the World Soundtrack Award – Lifetime Achievement in 2015. Fenton also received five nominations for the Academy Award for Best Original Score.

== Academy Awards ==
Year	Nominee / work	Award	Result	Ref.
1983	Gandhi	Best Original Score	Nominated	
1988	Cry Freedom	Best Original Score	Nominated	
1988	Cry Freedom	Best Original Song	Nominated	
1989	Dangerous Liaisons	Best Original Score	Nominated	
1992	The Fisher King	Best Original Score	Nominated	

== BAFTA Awards ==
Year	Nominee / work	Award	Result	Ref.
1981	Shoestring	Best Original Television Music	Nominated	
1981	Bloody Kids	Best Original Television Music	Nominated	
1981	Fox	Best Original Television Music	Nominated	
1982	Bergerac	Best Original Television Music	Won	
1982	The History Man	Best Original Television Music	Nominated	
1982	Going Gently	Best Original Television Music	Nominated	
1982	BBC News theme	Best Original Television Music	Nominated	
1983	Gandhi	Best Original Score	Nominated	
1985	The Jewel in the Crown	Best Original Television Music	Nominated	
1987	The Monocled Mutineer	Best Original Television Music	Won	
1988	Cry Freedom	Best Original Score	Nominated	
1989	Talking Heads	Best Original Television Music	Nominated	
1990	Dangerous Liaisons	Best Original Score	Nominated	
1991	Memphis Belle	Best Original Score	Nominated	
1991	The Trials of Life	Best Original Television Music	Nominated	
1994	Life in the Freezer	Best Original Television Music	Nominated	
1996	The Madness of King George	Anthony Asquith Award for Film Music	Nominated	
2002	The Blue Planet	Best Original Television Music	Won	
2006	Mrs Henderson Presents	Anthony Asquith Award for Film Music	Nominated	
2007	Planet Earth	Best Original Television Music	Nominated	
2012	Frozen Planet	Best Original Television Music	Nominated	

== Emmy Awards ==
Year	Nominee / work	Award	Result	Ref.
2002	The Blue Planet – Seas of Life: Ocean World	Outstanding Music Composition for a Series (Dramatic Underscore)	Won	
2005	Pride	Outstanding Music Composition for a Miniseries, Movie or a Special (Dramatic Underscore)	Nominated	
2007	Planet Earth – From Pole to Pole	Outstanding Music Composition for a Series (Original Dramatic Score)	Won	

== Golden Globe Awards ==
Year	Nominee / work	Award	Result	Ref.
1988	Cry Freedom	Best Original Score - Motion Picture	Nominated	
2000	Anna and the King	Best Original Score - Motion Picture	Nominated	
2000	Anna and the King	Best Original Song - Motion Picture	Nominated	

== Grammy Awards ==
Year	Nominee / work	Award	Result	Ref.
1984	Gandhi	Best Album of Original Score Written for a Motion Picture or Television Special	Nominated	
1989	Cry Freedom	Best Song Written Specifically for a Motion Picture or for Television	Nominated	

== Saturn Awards ==
Year	Nominee / work	Award	Result	Ref.
1998	Ever After	Best Music	Nominated	

== Ivor Novello Awards ==
Year	Nominee / work	Award	Result	Ref.
1980	Shoestring	Best Best Theme from A TV or Radio production	Nominated	
1981	Fox	Best Best Theme from A TV or Radio production	Nominated	
1983	Omnibus	Best Best Theme from A TV or Radio production	Nominated	
1983	Gandhi	Best Film Theme or Song	Won	
1985	The Jewel in the Crown	Best Theme from A TV or Radio Production	Won	
1985	The Company of Wolves	Best Theme or Song	Nominated	
1987	The Monocled Mutineer	Best Best Theme from A TV or Radio Production	Won	
1988	Cry Freedom	Best Film Score	Won	
1993	Final Analysis	Best Film Theme or Song	Nominated	
1993	Shadowlands	Best Film Score	Won	
1995	Beyond the Clouds	Best Theme from A TV or Radio Production	Nominated	
1999	Ever After	Best Film Score	Nominated	
2000	Anna and the King	Best Film Score	Nominated	
2002	The Blue Planet	Best Original TV Music	Nominated	
2005	Deep Blue	Best Original Film Score	Nominated	
2010	Life	Best TV Soundtrack	Nominated	

== Classic Brit Awards ==
Year	Nominee / work	Award	Result	Ref.
2007	Planet Earth	Best Soundtrack	Won	

== European Film Award ==
Year	Nominee / work	Award	Result	Ref.
2012	The Angels' Share	Best Composer	Nominated	

== IFMCA Awards ==
Year	Nominee / work	Award	Result	Ref.
1998	Dangerous Beauty	Film Score of the Year	Nominated	
1998	Dangerous Beauty	Best Original Score for a Drama Film	Nominated	
1998	George Fenton	Film Composer of the Year	Nominated	
1998	Ever After: A Cinderella Story	Best Original Score for a Drama Film	Nominated	
1999	George Fenton	Film Composer of The Year	Nominated	
2007	Planet Earth	Best Original Score for Television	Won	
2008	Earth	Best Original Score for a Documentary	Won	
2009	Fool's Gold	Best Original Score for a Comedy Film	Nominated	
2010	Life	Best Original Score for a Television Series	Nominated	
2012	Frozen Planet	Best Original Score for a Documentary	Nominated	
2015	Bears	Best Original Score for a Documentary	Nominated	
2016	The Lady in the Van	Best Original Score for a Comedy Film	Nominated	
2023	Wild Isles	Best Original Score for a Documentary	Won	

== World Soundtrack Awards ==
Year	Nominee / work	Award	Result	Ref.
2015	George Fenton	World Soundtrack Award – Lifetime Achievement	Honored	

== BMI Awards ==
Year	Nominee / work	Award	Result	Ref.
1994	Groundhog Day	BMI Film Music Award	Won	
1999	You've Got Mail	BMI Film Music Award	Won	
2003	Sweet Home Alabama	BMI Film Music Award	Won	
2005	Hitch	BMI Film Music Award	Won	
2010	The Bounty Hunter	BMI Film Music Award	Won	
