= F. pratensis =

F. pratensis may refer to:

- Festuca pratensis, a grass species
- Formica pratensis, a red wood ant species found in Europe
