= Morelli's =

British ice cream retailer and franchise

- Industry: Production and retail of ice cream
- Founded: 1907; 119 years ago
- Founder: Giuseppe Morelli
- Area served: Worldwide
- Key people: Bibi Morelli
- Website: Official website

Morelli's Gelato is a producer and retailer of ice cream. The company was founded in 1907 by Giuseppe Morelli. Initially he sold ice cream from a bicycle with his son Mario. As the business grew, an ice cream van was used. In 1932, an ice cream parlour was opened on the seafront of the seaside resort of Broadstairs.

The company now has several branches which included a flagship concession in Harrods Food Hall and more recently, the historic Covent Garden market building and Portobello Road as well as global franchises in Dubai (Dubai Mall, JBR and Mall of Emirates), Kuwait (Avenues Mall), Bahrain Bahrain City Centre, Saudi Arabia (Mall of Dhahran), Manila, (Rockwell, Shangri-La Plaza and GH Mall), Kuala Lumpur (Bangsar), Tbilisi (Saburtalo), Libreville (Pont Gué Gué) and the Café de Paris, Monte Carlo.

Morelli's have opened a summer pop-up at the vintage Dreamland Theme Park.

In addition to luxury gelato which is produced fresh every day, in every store, Morelli's gelato also serve their own blend of Kilimanjaro coffee and their sundaes.

Morelli's has also been featured many times in TV/Films, such as Mary Berry, BBC's The One Show and The Lady in the Van. It has also been voted No.1 of the 5 Best Ice Cream parlours in the UK by the Telegraph, Top 10 by The Times, and Stylist magazine, as well as some of the best gelato in London and the best ice cream in Britain by Conde Nast Traveller.

== History ==
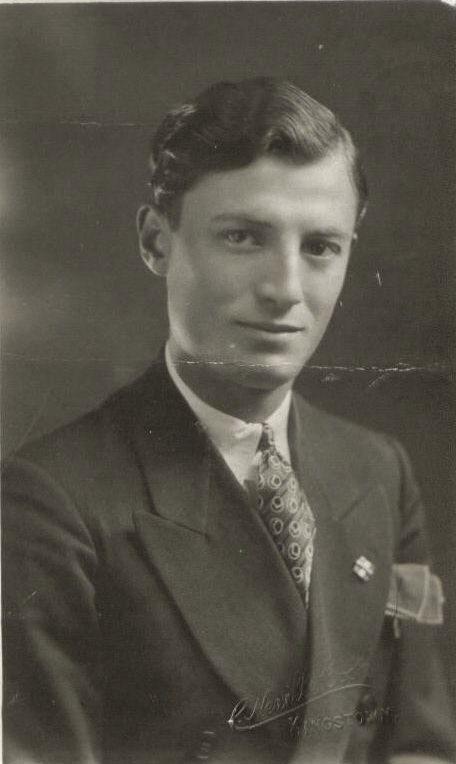
Angelo Morelli, who ran the branch in Northern Ireland, 1925

The Morelli family arrived in the UK from the village of Casalattico, Italy, in 1907. Soon after Mario Morelli began making ice cream, which he sold from a bicycle in Scotland and Northern Ireland. In 1932 Morelli opened an ice cream parlour and cappuccino bar on the seafront in Broadstairs, Kent. The ice cream parlour continues to serve visitors to Broadstairs today. After Mario Morelli's retirement the business was taken over by his son Giuseppe Morelli in 1954. He opened a second parlour/espresso bar in Broadstairs in 1955. In 1957 he rebuilt the Broadstairs ice cream parlour, which was the first of its kind in the UK selling over 20 flavours of ice cream.

In 1972 the two ice cream parlours in Broadstairs were taken over by Giuseppe's eldest Son, Marino Morelli. Each generation has contributed to the development of the business. Marino Morelli, while continuing the Gelato business, also focused on building what was at the time the biggest private coffee chain in the UK (with over 30 units), a bakery and sandwich factory. The parlour served more than 20 flavours, made in front of the customer and a variety of ice cream sundaes, which are still produced in Broadstairs, London and the many franchised units around the world.

Heading the 5th generation family business, Marino's daughter Bibi Morelli joined Morelli's Gelato in 2003 and took over fully in 2005, on her father's retirement. She has since built the international franchise arm of the business which has recently seen the sale of Marka PJSC, a retail start up listed on the Dubai Stock Exchange, of the UAE franchise operations of Morelli's Gelato for US$8.4million, with plans to expand by opening 17 additional Morelli's gelato stores in the MENA region by 2020.

=== Current Morelli’s Gelato Units ===
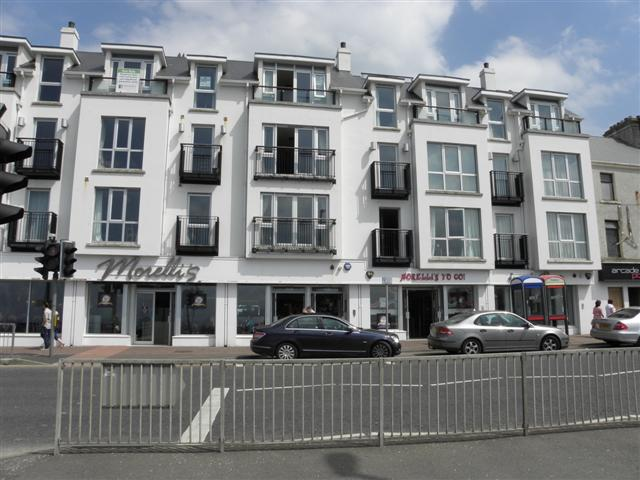
Morelli's in Portstewart, Northern Ireland

- Broadstairs, UK 1932 (historic flagship store)
- Harrods, UK, (2003–2013)
- Selfridge's UK, (2006–2010)
- The Avenue, Kuwait, 2007
- Café de Paris, Monaco, 2008
- Dubai Mall, UAE, 2009
- Saburtab, Tbilisi, 2011
- Mall of Dhahran, Saudi Arabia, 2011
- Bahrain City Centre, Bahrain, 2012
- Rockwell, Manila, 2012
- Zaguan Bakery, Dallas, 2012
- ShangriLa Mall, Manila, 2013
- JBR, Dubai, 2014
- Bangsar Shopping Centre, Malaysia, 2014
- Covent Garden, London, 2014
- Mall of Emirates, Dubai, 2015
- Pont de Guegue, Libreville, 2015
- Portobello Road, London, 2016
- Empire Subang, Kuala Lumpur, 2016

=== New Openings in 2016 ===
- Qatar, Mall of Qatar, Q3
- Mexico City, Q3
- Dalma Mall, Abu Dhabi, Q3
