= George Fenton =

British film composer (1949–2026)

George Fenton CBE
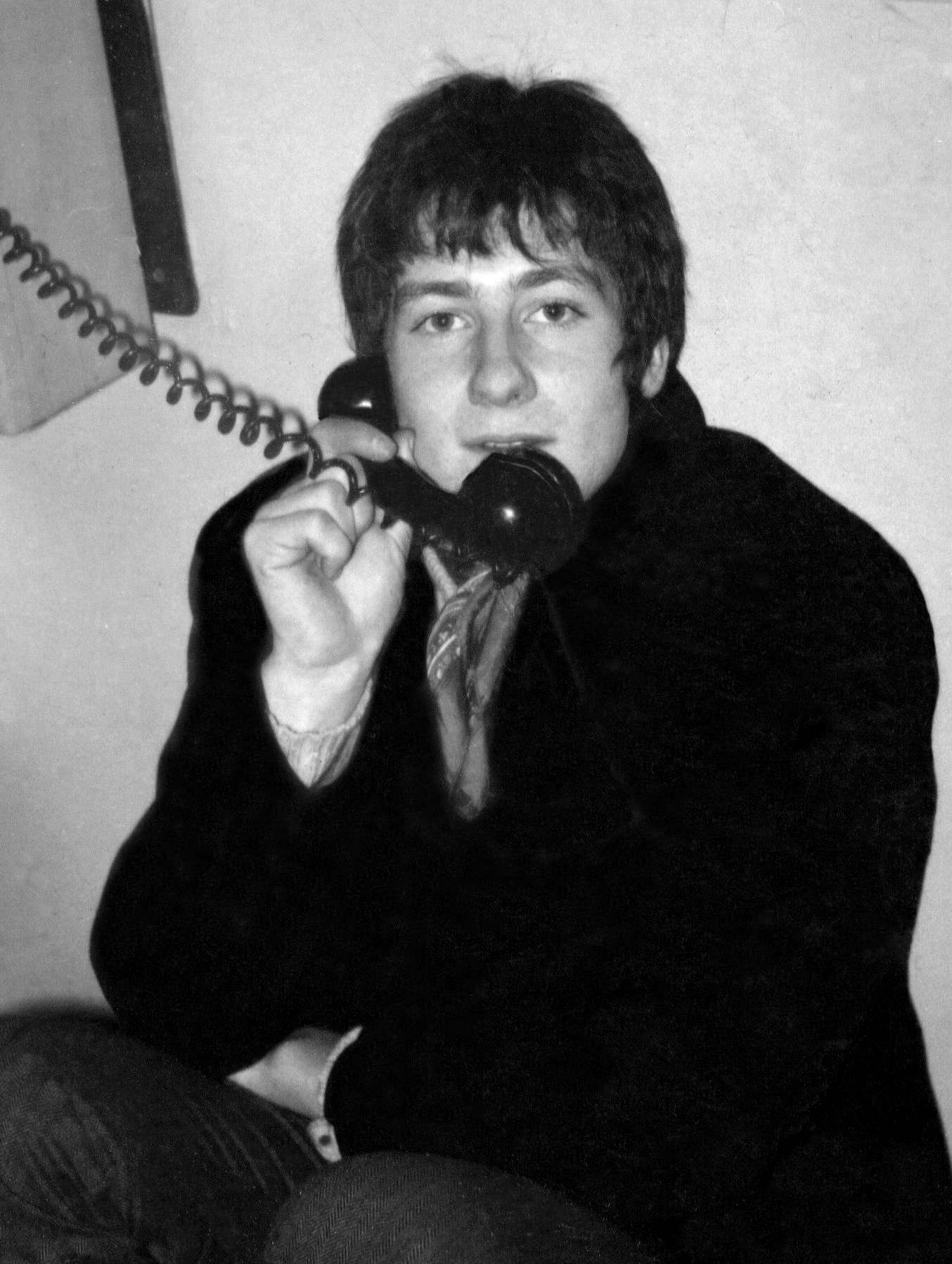
- Fenton in 1969

Background information
- Born: George Richard Ian Howe; 19 October 1949; Bromley, Kent, England
- Died: 5 October 2026 (aged 76) London, England
- Occupation: Composer
- Works: Discography
- Years active: 1968–2026
- Spouses: Amanda J McCarthy; Jane (divorced)
- Awards: List of awards
- Website: georgefenton.com

George Richard Ian Howe (19 October 1949 – 5 October 2026), known professionally as George Fenton, was an English film and television composer. He frequently collaborated with the directors Richard Attenborough, Nora Ephron, Alastair Fothergill, Stephen Frears, Nicholas Hytner, Ken Loach, Andy Tennant, Neil Jordan and Terry Gilliam.

Fenton was notable for his film scores for Gandhi, Cry Freedom, Dangerous Liaisons, Groundhog Day, The Fisher King, Dangerous Beauty, You've Got Mail, Sweet Home Alabama and Hitch. He was also known for composing the scores for documentary films for David Attenborough such as Planet Earth, Frozen Planet and Wild Isles.

He received five Academy Award nominations, several Ivor Novello, BAFTA, Golden Globe, Emmy and BMI Awards, and a Classic BRIT. He was one of the few songwriters and composers to have been made a Fellow of the Ivors Academy (formally BASCA).

== Early life and education ==
George Richard Ian Howe was born in Bromley, Kent (now the London Borough of Bromley), on 19 October 1949, one of five siblings. His father worked as a mechanical engineer, while his mother was a dancer and dance teacher before becoming a nurse during World War II. Fenton was educated at St Edward's School, Oxford. He began learning the guitar at the age of 8 and at St. Edward's studied the organ with Peter Whitehouse. He did not attend music college but continued to study with Whitehouse and subsequently with the ethnomusicologist and composer John Leach.

== Career ==
=== First years ===
In 1968 he appeared in Alan Bennett's first West End play Forty Years On. The following year he was offered a place at the Central School of Speech and Drama but had by then decided to continue with his music and had a record contract with MCA Records. For the next few years, he continued to work in theatre playing small parts and playing and writing music. In 1969, his cover of the Beatles' "Maxwell's Silver Hammer" was released and became a large hit in Sweden, reaching number six on Kvällstoppen and number one for two weeks on Tio i Topp in late January 1970.

=== Theatre ===
In 1974, Fenton received his first major commission, as composer and musical director for Peter Gill's theatre production of Twelfth Night by the Royal Shakespeare Company in Stratford-upon-Avon. Throughout the rest of the 1970s and early 1980s, Fenton worked frequently as a composer for theatre productions. He continued to collaborate regularly with Peter Gill (composing for nine of his productions) and also worked in regional theatre as well as for the Royal Shakespeare Company and The National Theatre. Other theatre includes The Judas Kiss, Last Cigarette, Untold Stories, Allelujah!, Mrs Henderson Presents, Buffalo Bill's Wild West Show, Talking Heads, Beat The Devil and Racing Demon. In 1992, Fenton was credited with the soundtrack to Buffalo Bill's Wild West Show at Disneyland, Paris.

=== Television drama ===
Fenton wrote his first television score in 1976. This was a continuation of his collaboration with Peter Gill and it was for Gill's production of Hitting Town written by Stephen Poliakoff. By the late 1970s, Fenton was working regularly in television. His television work included the regular role of soldier Martin Gimbel in Emmerdale Farm (1975–1976), LWT's Six Plays by Alan Bennett, Objects Of Affection, An Englishman Abroad, Talking Heads (2003), Bloody Kids, Going Gently, Walter, Saigon: Year of The Cat, Fox, Out, Telling Tales, The History Man, Shoestring, The Monocled Mutineer and the multi-BAFTA winning The Jewel In The Crown.

=== Wildlife television documentaries ===
Fenton composed for a number of notable wildlife television programmes, often collaborating with the wildlife broadcaster David Attenborough and the nature documentary filmmaker Alastair Fothergill. He started on the BBC's long-running series Wildlife on One and Natural World. From 1990 onwards, he wrote the music for a number of wildlife series including The Trials of Life, Life in the Freezer, The Blue Planet, Planet Earth, and Frozen Planet. In 2003, he composed and conducted the music for the feature documentary film Deep Blue. In 2007 they repeated the collaboration for the feature documentary film Earth. In 2022 George partnered up with Alastair Fothergill and David Attenborough again, this time for BBC One's Wild Isles series.

=== Television and radio themes ===
Fenton composed the jingles or theme music to dozens of British television and radio programmes, including Shoestring, Bergerac, One O'Clock News, Six O'Clock News and Nine O'Clock News, Newsnight and Newsnight Review, On the Record, Omnibus, Breakfast Time, BBC World News, BBC Reporting Scotland, BBC London Plus, Telly Addicts, Daily Politics, and BBC Radio 4's PM programme.

=== Feature films ===
His first major break came in 1982 with Richard Attenborough's biopic Gandhi, for which he was nominated—with his collaborator Ravi Shankar—for the Academy Award for Original Music Score. Fenton wrote another four film scores for Attenborough's films: Cry Freedom, Shadowlands, In Love and War and Grey Owl. Fenton also frequently worked with the theatre and film director Nicholas Hytner, writing the score for six of the seven movies that Nicholas Hytner has directed. These are The Madness of King George, The Crucible, The Object of My Affection, Center Stage, The History Boys and The Lady in the Van. The latter three of these allowed Fenton to collaborate again with their writer Alan Bennett. Although Fenton composed the original music of five of these films, for The Madness of King George he instead adapted and arranged the music of Handel.

His long-standing collaboration with Stephen Frears was not limited to television productions. Fenton scored four of Frear's feature films: Dangerous Liaisons, Hero, Mary Reilly and Mrs Henderson Presents. He also worked with the director Neil Jordan, scoring The Company of Wolves, High Spirits and We're No Angels. He scored more feature films for Ken Loach than for any other filmmaker, by 2023, a total of 18. This started in 1994 with Ladybird, Ladybird followed by Land and Freedom, Carla's Song, My Name Is Joe, Bread and Roses, The Navigators, Sweet Sixteen, Ae Fond Kiss..., The Wind That Shakes the Barley which won the Palme d'Or at the 2006 Cannes Film Festival, It's a Free World..., Looking for Eric, The Angels' Share, the documentary film The Spirit of '45, Jimmy's Hall, I, Daniel Blake and, most recently, Sorry We Missed You and The Old Oak.

Fenton developed other long-standing collaborations with filmmakers, scoring several films each for directors as diverse as Harold Ramis, Nora Ephron, Phil Joanou and Andy Tennant, including Multiplicity, Groundhog Day, Mixed Nuts, You've Got Mail, Final Analysis, The Fisher King, Heaven's Prisoners, Ever After: A Cinderella Story, Sweet Home Alabama, Anna and the King, Hitch, Bewitched and The Secret: Dare to Dream and Andy Tennant's new thriller Unit 234. His final film score was for the 2026 romantic comedy film Up Against It, which was released a month before his death.

=== Live ===
Fenton won an Ivor Novello Award, BAFTA and Emmy Award for Best Television Score for The Blue Planet and, in October 2002, he created "The Blue Planet in Concert" which was premiered at the Royal Festival Hall in London. He subsequently created Planet Earth In Concert and Frozen Planet In Concert and took these concerts to venues such as Hollywood Bowl, Sydney Opera House, Wembley Arena and the Ziggo Dome in Amsterdam.

With the producer Jane Carter, Fenton turned each of the scores into concert works. His live film scores continue to be performed by orchestras worldwide.

=== Other work ===
Fenton founded the Association of Professional Composers which later amalgamated with the British Academy of Songwriters, Composers and Authors and with the Composers' Guild of Great Britain to become the British Academy of Composers & Songwriters. He was a member of the Academy of Motion Picture Arts and Sciences and was a visiting professor at the Royal College of Music and the University of Nottingham.

In 2020, he and Simon Chamberlain released the album The Piano Framed. Available digitally and on CD and vinyl, it has solo piano arrangements by Chamberlain of many of Fenton's scores including The Blue Planet, Dangerous Liaisons, The Lady in the Van and Groundhog Day.

== Death ==
Fenton died on 5 October 2026, in London, at the age of 76.

After his death, The Telegraph remembered Fenton as a "genius" while noting his array of discography left an "unmistakable mark on British culture".

== Honours ==
Fenton was appointed Commander of the Order of the British Empire (CBE) in the 2023 New Year Honours for services to music.
