= Palace Cinema, Broadstairs =

Cinema in Broadstairs, Kent, England

Coordinates: 51.3594°N 1.4441°E

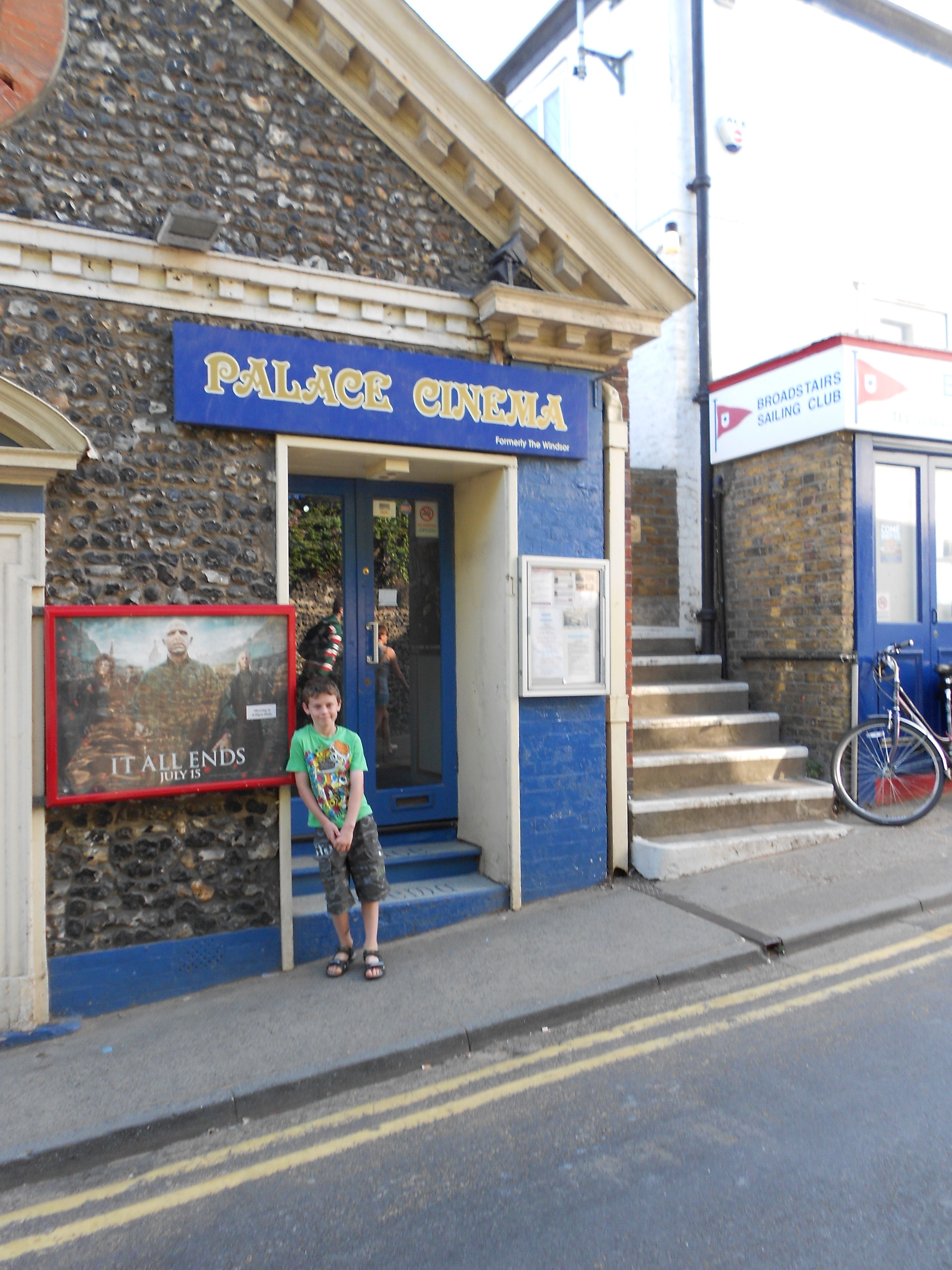
Harbour Street entrance to Palace Cinema (2012)

The Palace Cinema is an independent single-screen cinema in Broadstairs, Kent, England. Housed in a converted commercial building, it opened in 1965 as the Windsor Cinema, and was renamed the Palace in 2006. It now shows mainly independent films. The Grade II listed building is in Harbour Street, close to the beach at Viking Bay.

== History ==
=== Pre 1912 ===
Engraving of Broadstairs (1840): the cinema building is dark, in centre of engraving

No records have yet been found regarding the construction of the original building. It appears in images from the early/mid-1900s (the dark building in the centre of an 1840 engraving), the period in which Broadstairs developed fully from a village of fishing people and sailors into a popular resort town.

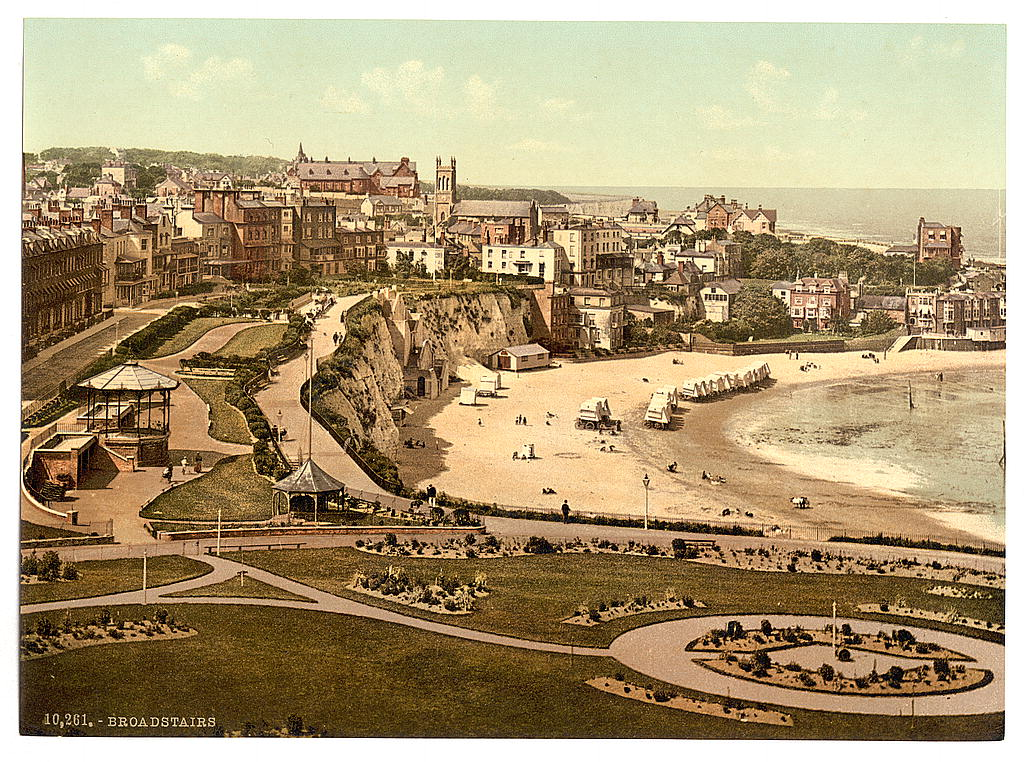
Postcard of Broadstairs (c.1890)

In photographic postcards from the 1890s onwards, it appears with windows on three storeys. In the Broadstairs & St Peter's Street Directory for 1900 it was listed as a wheelwright's premises.

=== York Gate Hall (1912 - 1965) ===
In 1912 the building was hollowed out and turned into one large space by historian Sir Guy Laking, a collector of armour, whose family holidayed next door at York Gate House. Named 'York Gate Hall', it was designed in neo-classical style to house his armour collection, with windows on three sides, clad in local brick and flint to blend with other buildings on Harbour Street.

Laking died in 1919 and the hall was sold to Broadstairs and St Peter's Urban District Council. Until the 1950s it was used to store beach equipment and hired out in the season for family entertainment, 16mm cartoon shows and puppet shows. One regular hire was the Laurey Puppet Theatre, whose Joy Laurey created the 'Mr Turnip' puppet character for one of the first British television programmes for children, Whirligig.

In the early/mid 1960s, after Broadstairs' two purpose-built cinemas - the Odeon and the Picture House - had both closed, the hall operated briefly as 'York Gate Cinema'.

=== The Windsor (1965 - 2006) ===
York Gate Hall was permanently converted into a cinema by R H Field of Winfield Cinemas, who had also owned the Carlton and Regal in nearby Westgate and Birchington. The 'Windsor' had a 29-seat balcony with 126 seats in the stalls below reached by a staircase, an enclosed projection box with 35mm projector, a new entrance on Harbour Street into a small foyer leading to a fully blacked-out auditorium with a curtained screen.

The internal layout has remained largely unchanged ever since. The building itself, Grade II listed by Historic England in 1974, is still leased from Thanet District Council.

The Windsor changed hands in 1986, was renovated, and began a regular partnership with Thanet Film Society (est.1995), part of the British Federation of Film Societies, which expanded the cinema's mainstream film programme to offer a weekly 'art house' film.

=== The Palace (2006 - present) ===
From 2006, its third owners converted it into a digital cinema with a 2K projector and Dolby Digital 5.1 surround sound, installed a screen almost the width of the building, enlarged the foyer for more concessions space and refurbished throughout, reducing the total seating capacity to 111. They renamed the cinema the 'Palace' and brought in an illuminated cinema organ. In 2008 they were interviewed by The Guardian newspaper for an article about the 10 best independent small cinemas in the UK.

In 2016 the cinema was taken on by its fourth and current owners. As well as changes including online ticketing and built-in air conditioning, they moved the cinema's programme away from more mainstream films, tagging the Palace as a place 'for people who love independent film'. By 2020, the Palace's programme was a mix of new and classic independent film, approximately one third of which was foreign language, also including live events and national and local community, cultural and education links with partners including Turner Contemporary and Into Film.

In 2021 it was named by Time Out as one of the 50 best cinemas in the UK and Ireland.

== References in popular culture ==
The Palace has been a film location, featuring as a village hall in The Lady in the Van (2015), visited by Maggie Smith as 'Miss Shepherd', and as itself in an early scene featuring Rose Byrne and Chris O'Dowd in Juliet, Naked (2018).
