= Wild Isles =

British television documentary series

- Genre: Documentary
- Narrated by: David Attenborough
- Country of origin: United Kingdom
- Original language: English
- No. of episodes: 5

Production
- Producer: Silverback Films
- Running time: 58 minutes

Original release
- Network: BBC One
- Release: 12 March – 9 April 2023

Wild Isles is a 2023 British television nature documentary series presented by Sir David Attenborough (not to be confused with the 92-minute video Wild Isles, a 2022 Webby Award honoree produced by Newyonder). The five-episode series covers the wildlife of the British Isles. Silverback Films was commissioned by the BBC to create the series, with co-production and part funding from the RSPB, World Wide Fund for Nature and Open University. It was filmed over three years in 145 locations across the British Isles.

The Guardian reported ahead of the series' start that a sixth episode would not be broadcast due to a fear of backlash from Conservatives and right-wing media over its themes of destruction of nature. However, the BBC responded that Wild Isles was always planned as a 5-part series, and that the 'sixth episode' was a standalone feature called Saving Our Wild Isles to be released online.

The series received positive reviews from critics.

== Episodes ==
No.	Title	Original release date	U.K. viewers (millions)
1	"Our Precious Isles"	12 March 2023	7.61
In the waters around Muckle Flugga in the Shetland islands, a group of orca named the "27 pod" by researchers have learned to hunt common and grey seals by following them into gullies where the seals sleep. Golden eagles make their home in the Cairngorms in the Scottish Highlands. In an ancient English oak, a female hazel dormouse climbs an oak to collect honeysuckle for her offspring, and narrowly escapes a tawny owl. In the woodlands, the flowering of common bluebells coincides with the time that young Eurasian badgers come above ground for the first time. Some insect pollinators have evolved a special relationship with certain plant species, such as the hummingbird hawkmoth with the red valerian, the buff-tailed bumblebee with bittersweet, and owl-midgeflies with lords-and-ladies. In Gloucestershire, a family of European red foxes play in the hay left behind after the harvest and attempt to catch summer chafers and finally hunt a field vole. On the island of Islay in the Inner Hebrides, 30,000 barnacle geese migrate, and reintroduced white-tailed eagles have learned to hunt them. In and around chalk streams, banded demoiselles mate and a common kingfisher catches common minnows. Bass Rock in the Firth of Forth is home to the largest gannet colony in the world, and the birds catch Atlantic herring and Atlantic mackerel by dive-bombing the water's surface. In the Farne Islands, Atlantic puffins catch lesser sand eels, which are then stolen from them by herring gulls and black-headed gulls. The episode concludes with Attenborough among puffins on the island of Skomer, calling the British people to conserve their remaining wildlife.
2	"Woodland"	19 March 2023	6.78
In a patch of Caledonian Pine Forest in the Cairngorms National Park in Scotland, some of the last woodland-dwelling golden eagles nest. In winter in the Forest of Dean, hazel dormice hibernate, and wild boar dig through the snow, which allows a European robin to hunt earthworms buried in the frozen ground. In spring in Sussex, male yew trees release their pollen into the wind in vast clouds. In the Scottish Highlands, a male western capercaillie calls to attract females, and fights off a rival male. In a deciduous broadleaf woodland near London, European red wood ants farm aphids for their honeydew. In an ancient cemetery in Surrey, a female European roe deer protects her fawns from a European red fox. In Sussex, a male purple emperor battles with rival males, barely escaping with his life. On the UK's west coast, Atlantic oakwood temperate rainforests grow, in which ash-black slugs mate. In summer in the Caledonian Forest, the pinecones are ripe, and Eurasian red squirrels take advantage of this. In the New Forest, three European honey buzzard chicks grow and learn to raid English wasp nests before they migrate to Africa. Autumn begins, and the deciduous trees lose their leaves; this is the breeding season for European fallow deer. Various fungi now sprout mushrooms and toadstools to spread their spores, and the wood wide web is shown. In a pine plantation next to Bodmin Moor, almost a million Eurasian starlings roost. At night, a common barn owl hunts the starlings.
3	"Grassland"	26 March 2023	6.07
In a field of barley on Islay, European brown hares undergo their courtship rituals, but have to watch out for golden eagles. In the Hebrides, grass keeps the sand dunes intact and protects a vital habitat: machair grasslands. A mixed-species flock of waders, including common ringed plovers, dunlins, northern lapwings, Eurasian oystercatchers and common redshanks work together to repel a common gull, which nevertheless manages to catch an oystercatcher chick. In Cambridgeshire, two Konik pony stallions battle for dominance. A mother field vole gathers food for her young while avoiding a short-eared owl. Two-coloured mason bees lay their eggs inside the empty shells of brown-lipped snails, hollowed out by the larvae of the common European glowworm. The largest colony of European rabbits in Britain can be found in Dorset, and here they are hunted by European red foxes. In a hay meadow in Gloucestershire, the large blue's lifecycle is dependent on the Sabuleti red ant. In the Cairngorms National Park, black grouse lek. In early spring in Northumbria, Common european adders emerge from hibernation and perform their courtship rituals. Back in the Cairngorms, a male hen harrier dances through the air to impress a female. In Ireland's County Kerry, red deer rut.
4	"Freshwater"	2 April 2023	5.37
5	"Ocean"	9 April 2023	5.03

== Score ==
The musical score was composed by George Fenton. This was the first time Fenton had composed a nature documentary score since 2014 and the first time he had composed one for a nature documentary miniseries since 2011. The five soundtrack albums (one for each episode) contain the following tracks:

=== Episode 1: Our Precious Isles ===
1. Wild Isles Introduction / Front Tiles (1:42)
2. Orca (5:58)
3. Geology (1:43)
4. Birds Eye View (2:21)
5. The Door Mouse (4:29)
6. Bluebells (1:31)
7. Pollenating (2:32)
8. Lords and Ladies (2:43)
9. Fox Cubs (2:30)
10. Barnacle Geese (5:31)
11. Damoiselles (4:15)
12. Kingfisher (1:44)
13. Gannets (3:17)
14. The Puffins (4:04)
15. The Message (0:44)
16. Wild Isles Trail (0:26)
17. Wild Isles End Credits (0:31)

=== Episode 2: Woodland ===
1. Opening Titles (0:25)
2. The Eagle (2:36)
3. Woodlands (1:53)
4. Robin's Friend (1:39)
5. Pollen (2:16)
6. Capercaillie (4:10)
7. The Ants (3:55)
8. Roe Deer (2:37)
9. The Emperor (2:12)
10. Strange Love (2:51)
11. Red Squirrel (3:13)
12. Honey Buzzard (3:39)
13. Fallow Deer (2:49)
14. Fungi (3:56)
15. Starling, Pt. 1 (2:15)
16. Starlings, Pt. 2 (2:36)
17. Wild Isles End Credits (0:31)

=== Episode 3: Grassland ===
1. Opening Titles (0:25)
2. Grassland Intro (0:50)
3. The Hares (3:21)
4. The Macca (0:51)
5. Lapwing Chick (2:39)
6. The Fens (1:03)
7. Wild Horses (1:13)
8. Battling Horses (1:46)
9. Avoiding The Owl (3:33)
10. Witchcraft (4:00)
11. Rabbits and Foxes (5:49)
12. Invader (4:33)
13. The Highland Fight (3:49)
14. Adders (4:15)
15. Han Harrier (3:53)
16. Stags (4:54)
17. Wild Isles End Credits (0:31)

=== Episode 4: Freshwater ===
1. Opening Titles (0:25)
2. Dragonfly and Introduction (2:31)
3. River Journey (1:47)
4. Dolphins Chase (1:16)
5. Upstream and Leaping the Falls (3:01)
6. Salmon Breeding (1:04)
7. Beaver and Kits (2:38)
8. Spidery Courtship (4:52)
9. Bats at Night (3:33)
10. Toads Crossing (2:20)
11. Toadlets (2:34)
12. Mayfly (4:21)
13. The Shrew (3:03)
14. Grebes (3:24)
15. The Knots (4:13)
16. Wild Isles End Credits (0:31)

=== Episode 5: Ocean ===
1. Opening Titles (0:25)
2. Marine (Opening) (3:04)
3. The Seal Fight (3:41)
4. Exploring the Shallows (1:23)
5. The Seahorse (1:52)
6. The Cuttlefish Story (6:18)
7. Sea Slugs (2:02)
8. Crabs en Masse (2:22)
9. The Tides (1:14)
10. Starfish Hunting (3:30)
11. Otters (2:47)
12. Protecting the Home (3:56)
13. Exotic Creatures Basking Sharks (4:49)
14. Skilful Hunters (3:20)
15. Marine (Closing) (1:19)
16. Wild Isles End Credits (0:31)

=== Spelling Mistakes ===
Some of the names of the tracks contain spelling errors, e.g. "door mouse" rather than dormouse, "pollenating" rather than pollinating, "damoiselles" rather than demoiselles, "han harrier" vs hen harrier, "macca" vs machair etc.
