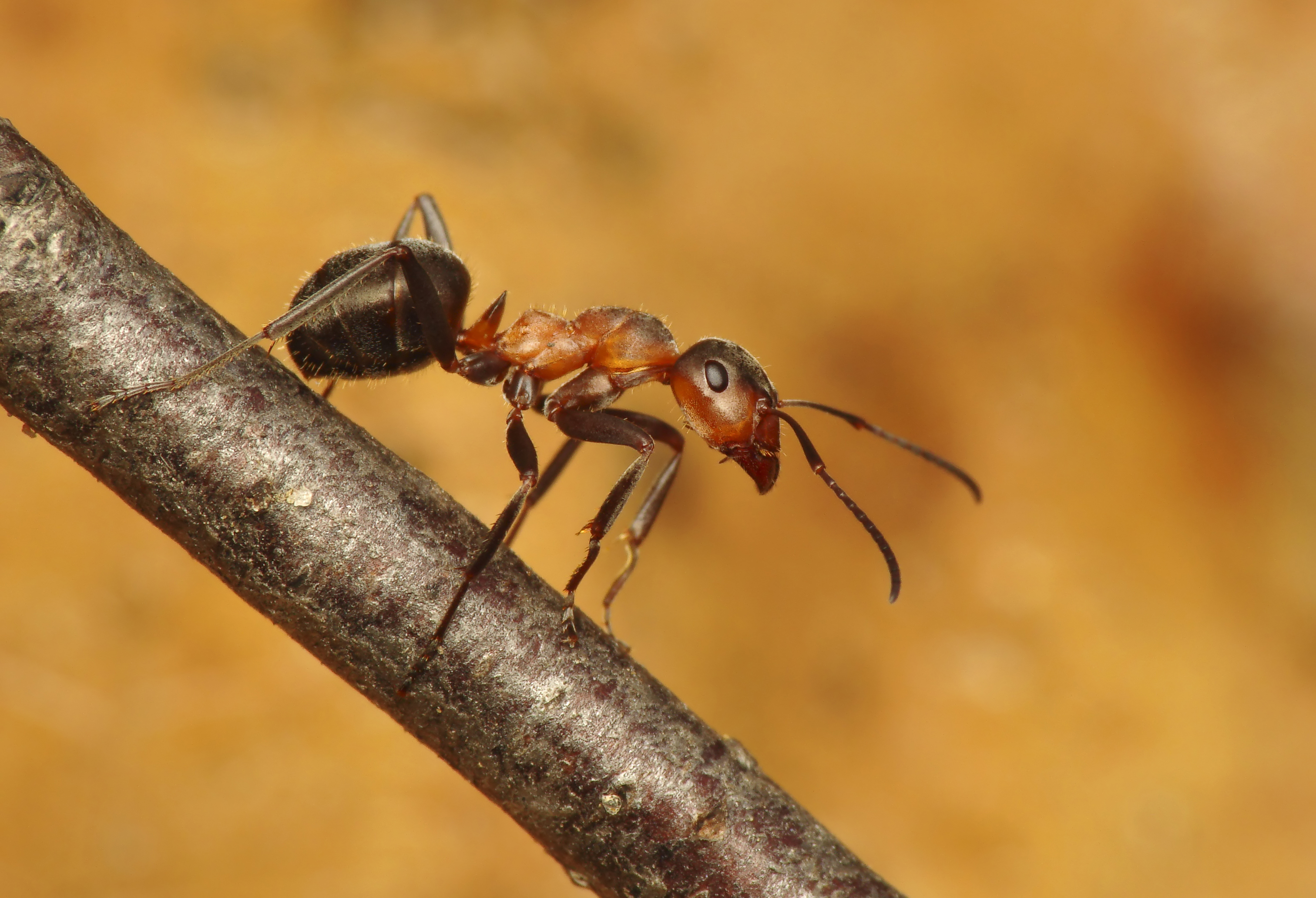
- Formica pratensis, worker
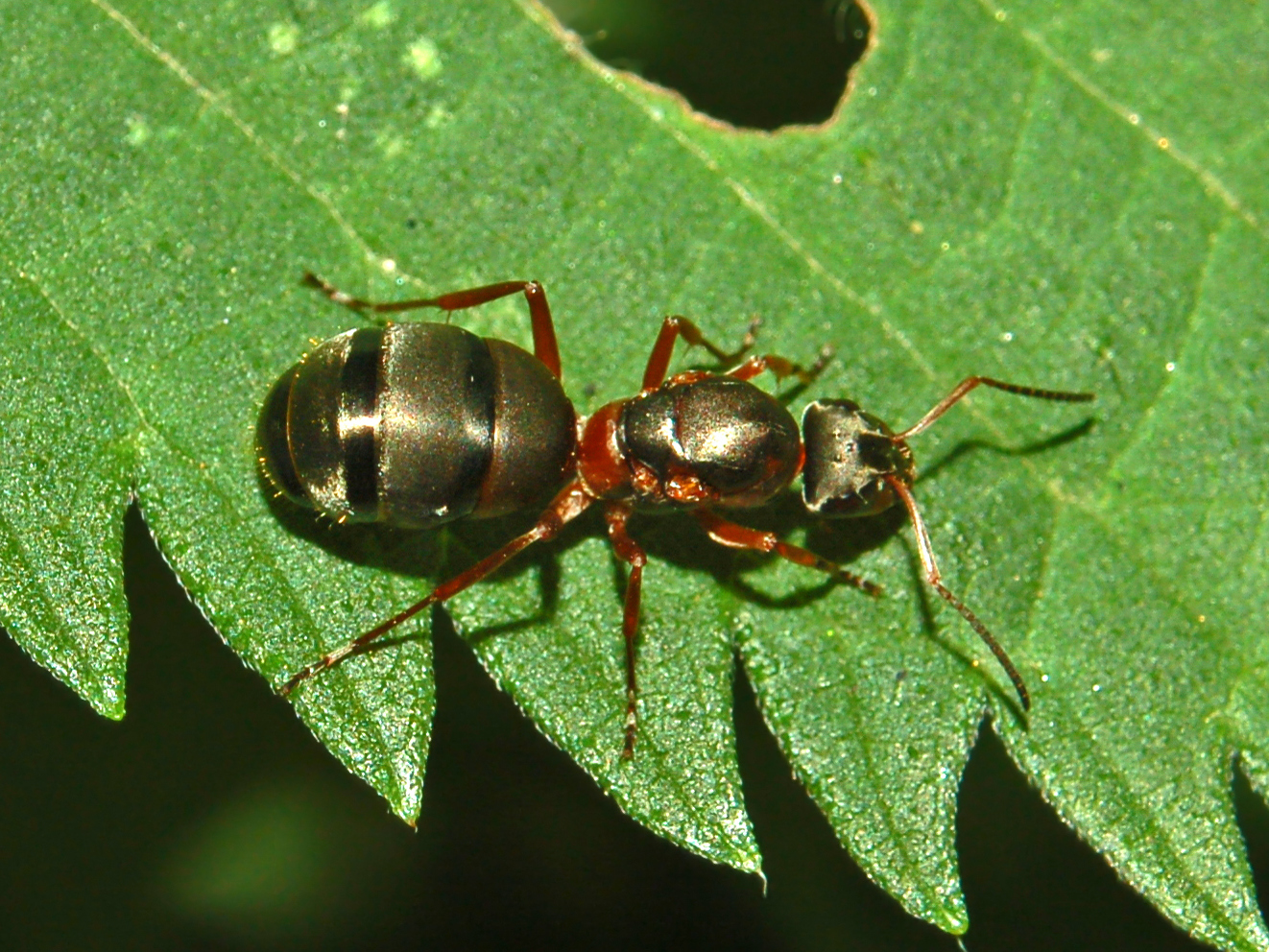
- Formica pratensis. Queen, dorsal view

Conservation status
- Near Threatened (IUCN 2.3)

Scientific classification
- Kingdom: Animalia
- Phylum: Arthropoda
- Class: Insecta
- Order: Hymenoptera
- Family: Formicidae
- Subfamily: Formicinae
- Genus: Formica
- Species: F. pratensis

Binomial name
- Formica pratensis Retzius, 1783

Synonyms
- Formica pratensis var. nigricans Bondroit, 1912

= Formica pratensis =

Species of ant

Formica pratensis, the black-backed meadow ant, is a species of European red wood ant in the family Formicidae.

== Systematic ==
Formica pratensis is divided into these subspecies:

- Formica pratensis nuda Ruzsky, 1926
- Formica pratensis pratensis Retzius, 1783
- Formica pratensis starkei Betrem, 1960

Some morphs have previously been named as their own species, like F. nigropratensis Betrem 1962 and Formica nigricans Emery in 1909, but are now considered junior synonymes of Formica pratensis.

== Description ==
F. pratensis can reach a length of 4.5–9.5 mm (0.18–0.37 in) in workers, slightly larger than in other species such as the more common southern wood ant F. rufa or F. polyctena. Queens reach a size of 9.5–11.3 mm (0.37–0.44 in). The thorax is mainly reddish, while the abdomen and the top of the head are black or dark brown. Generally, this large ant is much darker than other species of wood ants. Their whole bodies are covered with fine hairs. Two large deep black patch are present on the pronotum and mesonotum. The legs, antennae, and the well-developed mouthparts are reddish or dark brown.

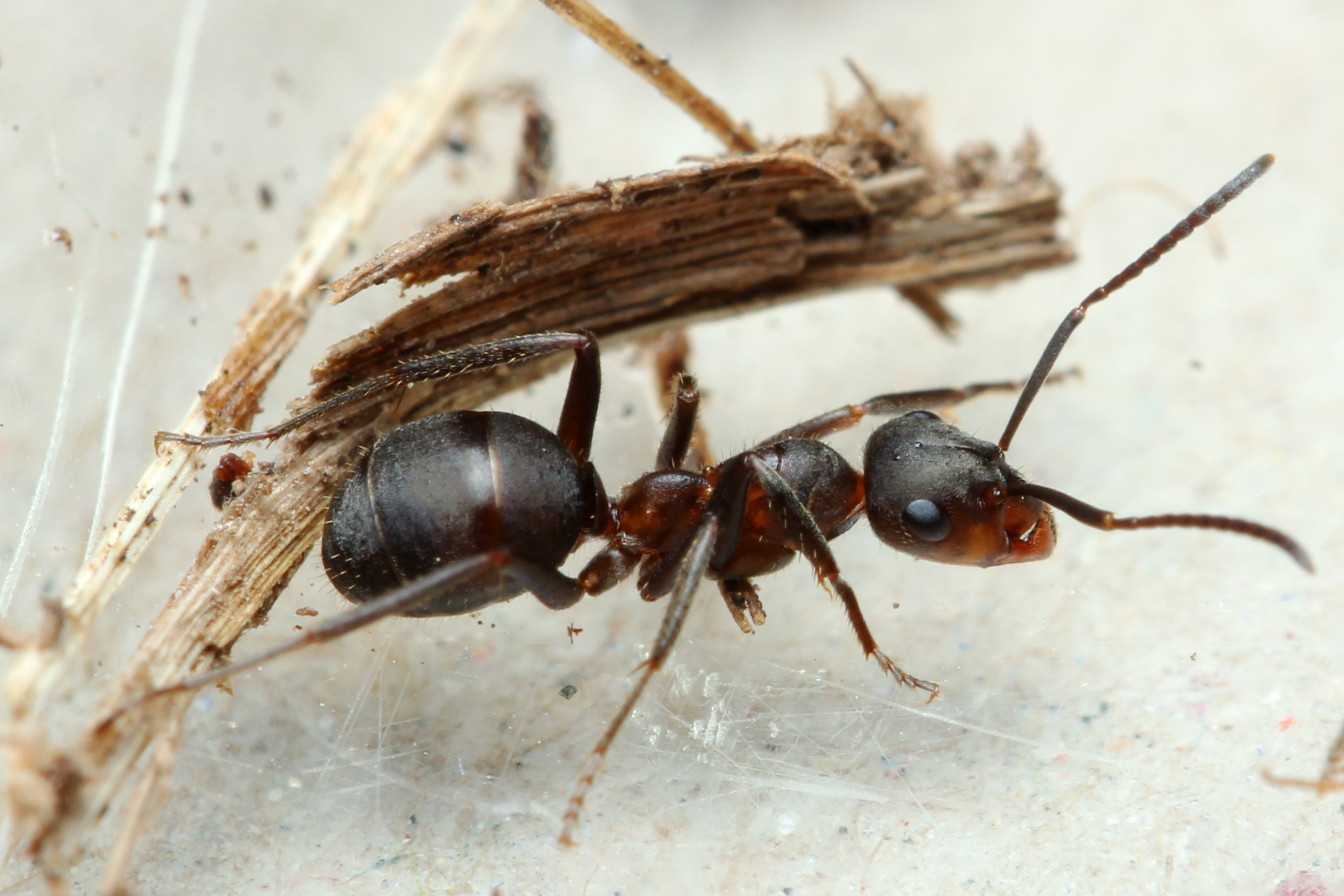
Formica pratensis, worker

== Life cycle ==
Their nests are built from grasses, pine needles and straw, and can reach up to a meter in diameter. One nest can have either a single queen or very few. Winged males and females can be present in nests from late April to September, as this species reflects the production of two separate generations. The first generation of ants develop from late April to mid-July, the second generation from mid-August to late September. This species mainly feeds on insects and other small animals, and collects honeydew from aphids.

== Distribution ==
This species can be found in Austria, Belgium, Bulgaria, Czech Republic, Estonia, Finland, France, Georgia, Germany, Guernsey, Hungary, Italy, Latvia, Lithuania, Luxembourg, Moldova, Netherlands, Norway, Poland, Romania, Russia, Serbia and Montenegro, Slovakia, Spain, Sweden, Switzerland, Turkey, and Ukraine. It is also present in the East Palearctic realm and in the Near East. The species is extinct in the UK since 1988. In forests weakened by pollution and acid rain in central Europe, red wood ant populations are often endangered for little known reasons which in turn causes further imbalances in predator-prey dynamics and the ecosystem.

== Habitat ==
This species is characteristic of rough alpine pastures, up to a height of about 1,500 meters. It can be found in dry heathland, meadows and roadsides.
