= The Spirit of '45 =

2013 British documentary film by Ken Loach

- Directed by: Ken Loach
- Screenplay by: Ken Loach
- Produced by: Rebecca O'Brien, Kate Ogborn, Lisa Marie Russo
- Music by: George Fenton
- Release dates: February 2013 (Berlin); 15 March 2013 (UK)
- Running time: 94 minutes
- Country: United Kingdom
- Language: English

The Spirit of '45 is a 2013 documentary film by British director Ken Loach, focused on and celebrating the radical changes in post-war Britain under the Labour government of Clement Attlee, which came to power in 1945. Relying primarily on archive footage and interviews, and without a narrative voiceover, the film recounts the endemic poverty in prewar Britain, the sense of optimism that followed victory in World War II and the subsequent expansion of the welfare state, founding of the National Health Service and nationalisation of significant parts of the UK's economy. The film documents the extent to which these achievements, as Loach sees them, have since been subject to attack in the decades that followed, particularly under the Conservative governments of Margaret Thatcher in the 1980s. Loach said that the model for the film was "oral history, with pictures".

== Reception ==
Time Out described it as consisting of a "compelling mix of interviews, both old and new", while noting that the theme of the film was as much about "the spirit of modern Britain" and implicit criticism of modern-day politicians, both Labour and Conservative. Reviewing the film for The Observer, Philip French described it as "skilfully compiled" but sentimental and simplistic rather than "the provocative polemic one might have expected". Peter Bradshaw of The Guardian acknowledged that the film could be seen as "patrician-nostalgist" but said he was "swept along by the calm simplicity of its presentation". The review in The Daily Telegraph described it as a "stirring" film that was probably Loach's best since 2002.
