= European red wood ant =

There are three species of European red wood ant in the genus Formica:

- Formica polyctena
- Formica pratensis
- Formica rufa
