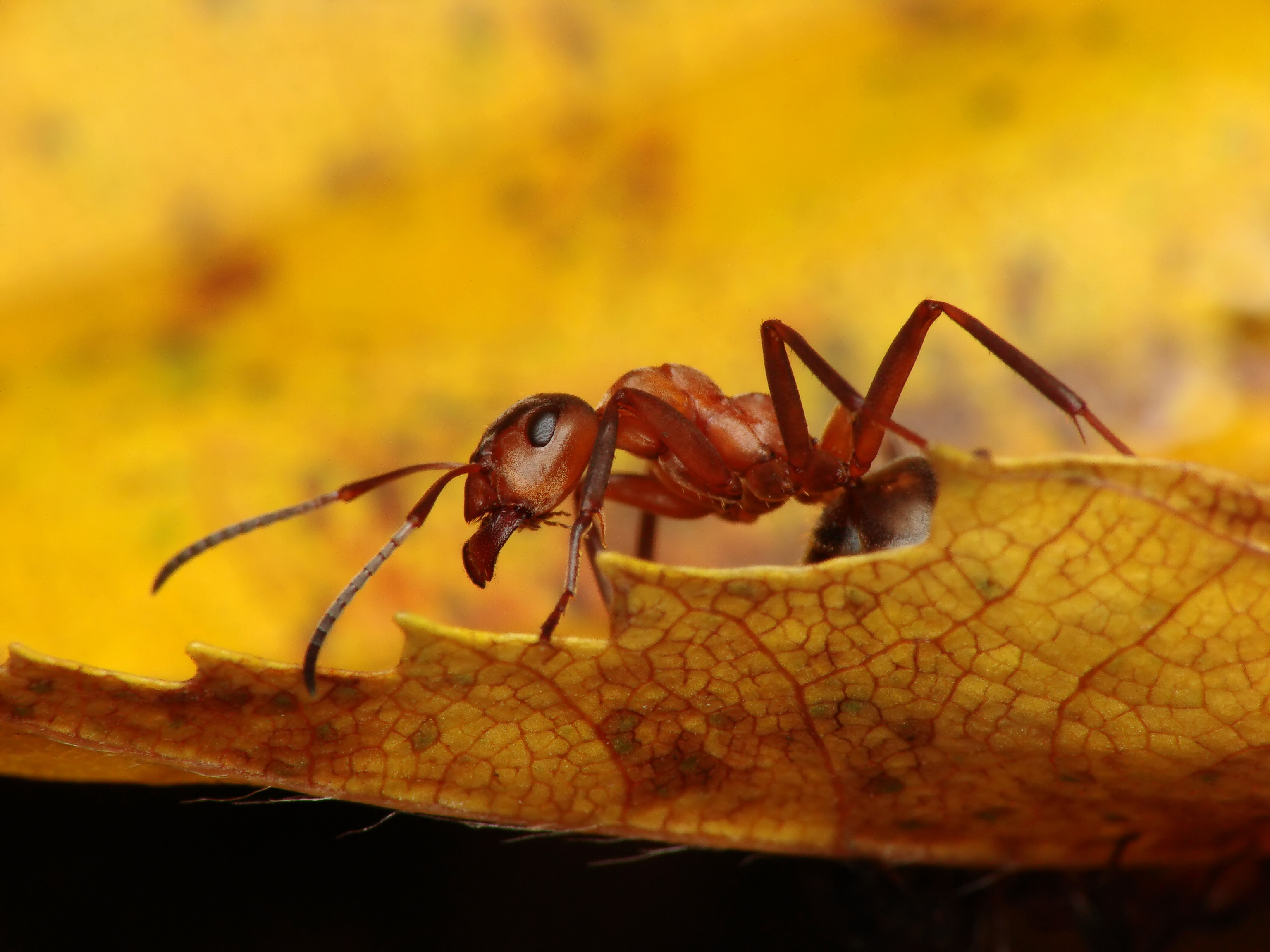

Conservation status
- Near Threatened (IUCN 2.3)

Scientific classification
- Kingdom: Animalia
- Phylum: Arthropoda
- Clade: Pancrustacea
- Class: Insecta
- Order: Hymenoptera
- Family: Formicidae
- Subfamily: Formicinae
- Genus: Formica
- Species: F. polyctena

Binomial name
- Formica polyctena Förster, 1850

= Formica polyctena =

Species of ant

Formica polyctena is a species of European red wood ant in the genus Formica and large family Formicidae. The species was first described by Arnold Förster in 1850. The latin species name polyctena is from Greek and literally means 'many cattle', referring to the species' habit of farming aphids for honeydew food. It is found in many European countries. It is a eusocial species, that has a distinct caste system of sterile workers and a very small reproductive caste. The ants have a genetic based cue that allow them to identify which other ants are members of their nest and which are foreign individuals. When facing these types of foreign invaders the F. polyctena has a system to activate an alarm. It can release pheromones which can trigger an alarm response in other nearby ants.

It is found in Austria, Belgium, Bulgaria, Czech Republic, Estonia, Finland, France, Germany, Hungary, Italy, Latvia, Lithuania, Luxembourg, the Netherlands, Norway, Poland, Romania, Russia, Serbia and Montenegro, Slovakia, Spain, Sweden, Switzerland, and Ukraine.

== Behavior ==
=== Eusociality ===
Formica polyctena like many ant, wasp and bee species, displays a eusocial system. Eusocial insects are characterized by cooperative care of young among members of a colony, distinct caste systems where some individuals breed and most individuals are sterile helpers, and overlapping generations so mother, adult offspring and immature offspring are all living at the same time. In a eusocial colony, an individual is assigned a specialized caste before they become reproductively mature, which makes them behaviorally distinct from other castes. Red wood ants exhibit all of these characteristics, with queens and males that make up the reproductive caste and sterile female workers that aid in brood care and colony maintenance.

==== Worker sterility ====
Workers in ant colonies are typically sterile females that do not reproduce. F. polyctena is consistent with this model, with almost completely sterile workers that do not lay eggs. This is in contrast to other Formica species that have workers that actually do reproduce, disrupting the eusocial system. F. polyctena's high proportion of worker sterility indicates a strict obligate polygynous colony structure that most likely allows for a stable unicoloniality, or the cooperation of several nests. In other words, workers do not have the ability to disrupt the strict social segregation of reproduction by reproducing themselves. Thus they uphold a multi-queen, multi-nest cooperation that may not be advantageous to their genes since they act altruistically toward non-kin.

==== Foragers ====
In F. polyctena colonies, there appears to be a separate group of designated foraging workers. The number of foragers correlates with the size of the colony. Foragers also tend to be older workers. However, if foragers are lost or die, other workers from the nest can replace them, indicating some flexibility in designated roles within the colony. These replacement workers have a shorter life expectancy as foragers, indicating that there could be some physiological development as the workers age that allows them to be effective foragers.

=== Nestmate recognition ===
In order to prevent costly conflict between fellow nestmates or involuntarily altruistic behavior toward ants from a foreign nest, individual ants need to distinguish between their fellow nestmates and foreigners. It has been demonstrated that Formica polyctena uses genetically-based cues as a nestmate recognition mechanism. Since F. polyctena, like all ant species, lives in colonies with high genetic relatedness, this type of mechanism would be successful in distinguishing between colonies. Beye, Neumann and Moritz conducted a study where pairs of ants from different nests were introduced to each other to see if they fought, tolerated or avoided one another. Pairs of ants from the same nests were introduced as well to act as a control. Genetic similarity between these ants was measured as well. A strong positive correlation existed between antagonistic behavior and genetic dissimilarity. Thus, F. polyctena ants mostly likely recognize their fellow workers through some genetically produced signal. Nest populations in close physical proximity to one another did not necessarily demonstrate either extremely aggressive or passive behavior toward each other, indicating that nest proximity does not influence recognition. Additionally, nest distance did not correlate with genetic similarity. Essentially, F. polyctena has adapted some form of genetically-based cue that allows nestmates to distinguish between each other and foreign individuals. Beye, Neumann and Moritz believe that these genetic cues act to keep nest colonies separate in homogenous environments that offer no other nestmate recognition strategies.

=== Alarm signals ===
Alarm behavior can be triggered in Formica polyctena by the release of pheromones. When ants come across a specific pheromone, they approach the source with jaws wide open, as if confronting a threat. Specifically in F. polyctena, these chemical alarm signals elicit a response not only within the nest, but along foraging paths. In particular, the formic acid sprayed by ants when attacked can trigger a predator alarm response in nearby ants, gathering reinforcements to attack the predator. In this way, formic acid doubles as a chemical weapon against predators and an alarm signal in F. polyctena.

=== Disease resistance ===
Due to the close living situation of individuals in a F. polyctena colony, diseases can spread rapidly, causing significant damage to the colony's population. Therefore, F. polyctena has evolved responses to combat the spread of disease. When an individual ant develops an immune response to some disease, the other workers can sense this. The workers decrease mouth-to-mouth exchanges of liquid, and prevent the infected individual from moving around. The healthy workers also increase antennal contact and grooming of the infected ant. This is believed to either remove pathogens from the ant that could cause such an immune response, or act as a "social vaccination". Aubert and Richard proposed this social vaccination model, where they argue that if fellow nestmates groom an infected ant, they will be exposed to small amounts of the pathogens or molecules that could trigger an immune response within the healthy individuals. In essence, the healthy individuals develop a resistance to the pathogens carried by the infected individual before the pathogens can spread and infect them.

=== Wars and cannibalism ===
F. polyctena colonies wage wars on neighboring colonies. During wars, any dead ants are cannibalized by the colonies. These wars occur when food is scarce, usually during the spring months, so that the colonies can effectively feed a new generation of ants. Old workers commonly participate in these wars, due to their lower life expectancy than young workers. Spring wars allow the colonies to produce new generations consisting mainly of reproductives (queens and males) rather than workers. The rare wars during the summer and fall months produce food for new generations of workers instead. These young workers are more likely to survive the winter than the old workers who die in the wars. Essentially, the colonies recycle their food resources in the form of workers. Old workers die and are eaten to give rise to either reproductive or new workers. Even if a colony "loses" a war and there is a net loss of workers, the warring still provides food, and thus is beneficial to the colony. However, cannibalism is not an efficient food source unless other food resources are scarce, since one new individual requires more food input than another individual's body can provide.

=== Larvae predation ===
Haccou and Hemerik studied the effects of the cinnabar moth larvae (Tyria jacobaeae) distribution on predation by F. polyctena. They found that the ants preyed more on larvae when they were on the ground than on plants. The ants also preyed more often on larvae that were concentrated in clusters over ones that were evenly dispersed. This is most likely due to communication between the ants, where when one worker discovers food such as a group of larvae, she alerts fellow workers.

== Nest temperature regulation ==
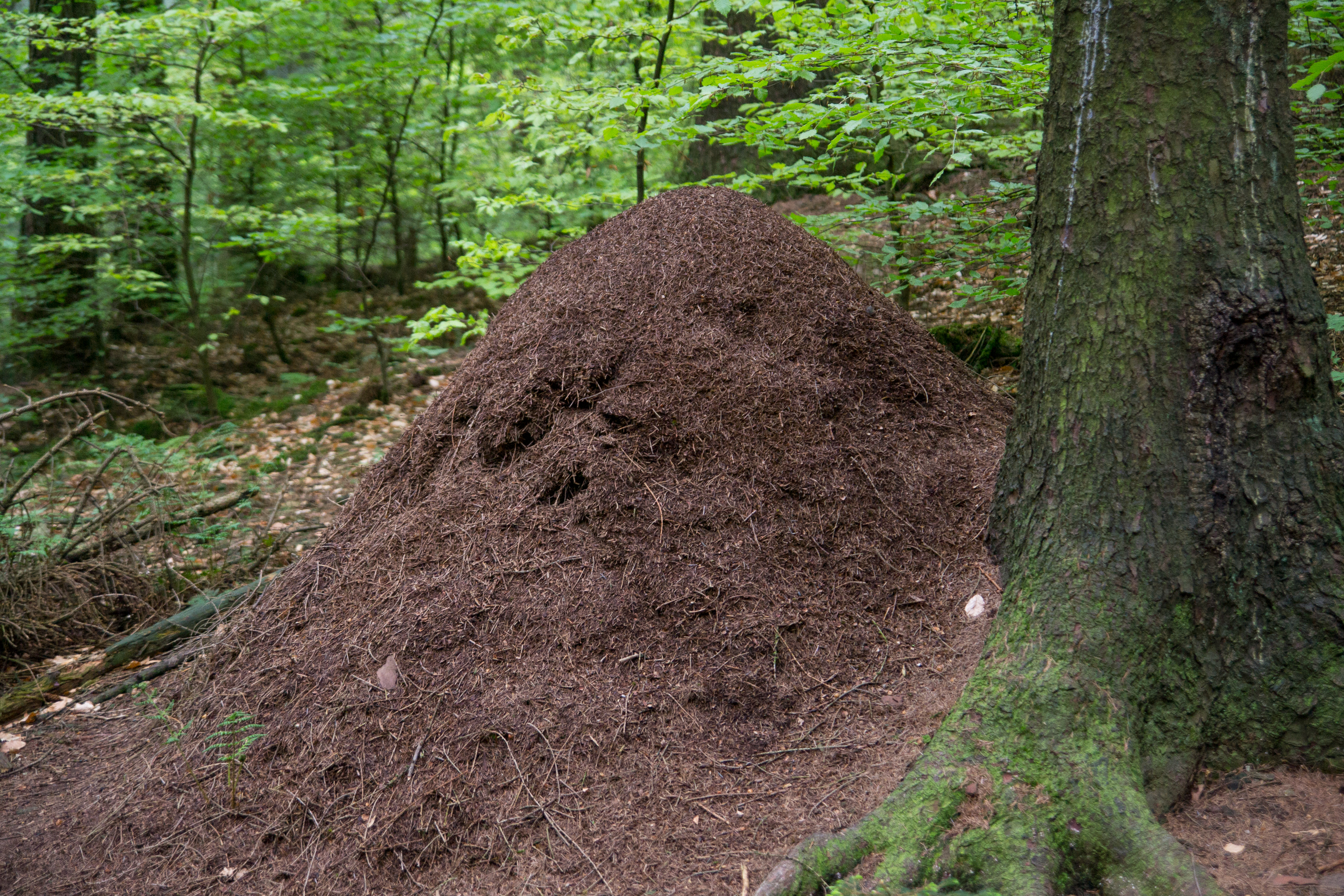
F. polyctena nest from Horn-Bad Meinberg, Germany

F. polyctena, among other social insects, has developed strategies to maintain a stable interior nest temperature despite temperature fluctuations outside. Nest moisture, solar radiation, heat produced by the metabolic activities of workers, and microbial activity in the nest material all contribute to nest thermoregulation. A stable temperature is especially crucial to the rate of development of larvae and pupae in the nest. Additionally, it has been suggested that the particular construction of the F. polyctena nests allows them to have excellent heat capacity, despite their low density and low heat capacity materials. Essentially, the outer layer of nests consists of pine needles, sap and buds, that absorbs a large amount of solar radiation. The inner core of the nest consists of mostly twigs that act like a thermal "sponge" into which external heat is funneled.

=== Dry nests ===
Nest moisture, solar radiation, heat produced by the metabolic activities of workers, and microbial activity in the nest material all contribute to nest thermoregulation. Dry, exposed F. polyctena nests have higher temperatures during the evening, but lose heat slowly throughout the night. This fluctuation is due to the solar radiation absorbed by the nest and workers during the day. When the workers return in the evening, they have high body temperatures from foraging in the sun that warm the interior of the nest. Dry nests have low external surface temperatures during the night, indicating that the physical nest material effectively retains most of the heat gained during the day. Additionally, because these workers metabolize, they release heat from this process and counteract the heat loss from the nest during the night.

=== Moist nests ===
Moist, shaded nests display a different daily temperature pattern than dry nests due to the different conditions. In the evenings, the nest temperature drops and then increases as the night progresses. Solar radiation does not contribute a lot of heat to the nest. Also, the nest material is not an effective insulator like the dry nest material. Moist nests have high external surface temperatures during the night. Instead, they rely on another curious mechanism to warm the nest: microbial activity within the moist nest material. As the workers inside the nest during the evening raise the temperature of the surroundings, microbial activity increases which heats the nest. Indeed, microbial activity is much higher in nest material than in the surrounding forest floor. Microbial activity is not seen in dry nests because the microbes require water. However, despite this adaptation, moist nests on average have lower internal temperatures than dry nests.

=== Seasonal fluctuation ===
Formica polyctena nest temperature fluctuates seasonally as well. In the spring, there is a dramatic increase in heat production of the nest material, and then a more gradual decrease in the fall. This corresponds with the activity of the ants throughout the year. It is possible that the ants' building activities aerate and provide optimum nutritional conditions for microbial activity, increasing the heat production of the nest well beyond what the ants themselves produce.
