= Deep Blue (2003 film) =

- Directed by: Alastair Fothergill; Andy Byatt
- Produced by: Alix Tidmarsh; Sophokles Tasioulis
- Edited by: Martin Elsbury
- Music by: George Fenton
- Production companies: BBC Worldwide; BBC Natural History Unit; Greenlight Media
- Distributed by: Optimum Releasing (United Kingdom); Kinowelt Filmerleih (Germany)
- Release date: 20 September 2003 (San Sebastian)
- Running time: 90 minutes
- Countries: United Kingdom; Germany
- Language: English
- Budget: £2.8 million
- Box office: US$30 million

Deep Blue is a 2003 nature documentary film that is a theatrical version of the 2001 BBC nature documentary series The Blue Planet. Alastair Fothergill and Andy Byatt are credited as directors, and six cinematographers are also credited. The film premiered at the San Sebastian Film Festival in Spain on 20 September 2003. It screened in over 20 territories from 2003 to 2005 and grossed over $30 million at the box office.

== Production ==
Deep Blue is a theatrical version of the 2001 BBC nature documentary series The Blue Planet. BBC Worldwide and Germany's Greenlight Media co-produced the film. Alastair Fothergill and Andy Byatt are credited as directors, and six cinematographers were also credited: Doug Allan, Mike deGruy, Peter Scoones, Simon King, Rick Rosenthal, and Bob Cranston. The idea for Deep Blue developed from when a shorter version of The Blue Planet was cut for The Proms in 2002, and for which George Fenton composed a score. When BBC Worldwide partnered with Greenlight Media and the latter helped raise money for the film, the filmmakers reviewed over 70,000 hours of raw footage from The Blue Planet. Ultimately, a quarter of Deep Blue consisted of footage not shown in The Blue Planet. Producer Sophokles Tasioulis said, "There's not a single cut in the movie that's the same as the TV series." The film contains only 15 lines of narrative. Filmmakers enlisted Fenton to compose the film's score, which was performed by the Berlin Philharmonic in their cinematic debut. Voiceovers were also recorded for different countries. Production of the theatrical version cost £2.8 million, while marketing and distribution cost an additional £1 million.

== Release ==
Footage of Deep Blue was first screened at the Cannes Film Market on 18 May 2003. It premiered at the San Sebastian Film Festival in Spain on 20 September 2003. Variety reported, "'Deep Blue' world preemed at San Sebastian to applause Saturday."

Deep Blue was the first theatrical release from BBC Worldwide. Not including the United States, Deep Blue was theatrically distributed in over 20 territories and grossed $30 million at the box office. The film "performed well" in theaters in Europe. In Germany, it became the highest-grossing documentary film to date. In Japan, it broke records at the box office. The documentary was released on DVD before Christmas 2004. Over 480,000 units were sold in the United Kingdom, France, Germany, and Switzerland. In Japan, it sold over 110,000 copies on the first day and became the first documentary to rank first on Japan's DVD charts.

Miramax Films acquired rights in December 2003 to distribute Deep Blue in North America. Variety called the acquisition "a rare foray for the distrib into nonfiction films". It gave the film a limited release in June 2005. Deep Blue screened in five theaters for 12 weeks and grossed $132,261.

== Critical reception ==
The film review website Metacritic reported that among a sample of 17 critics from the United States, 11 gave Deep Blue a positive review and 6 gave it a mixed review. The website gave the film an overall score of 71 out of 100. Laura Kern of The New York Times called Deep Blue, a re-cut of The Blue Planet, "a more visual and less informative re-assemblage of the mounds of footage shot for the show, is alternately mind-blowing and mind-numbing". Kern commended footage of deep-sea creatures as "so exotic they would be the envy of any science-fiction film". The critic concluded, "The experience of 'Deep Blue' is hardly enlightening. In the end, a sliver of knowledge may be gained, or environmental concerns only briefly alluded to might be pondered, but mostly what remains are pretty pictures that quickly fade into oblivion."
