= Andy Byatt =

British filmmaker

Andy Byatt is an English wildlife documentary film producer for the BBC Natural History Unit (NHU) in Bristol. His expertise is in the creation of underwater wildlife films. He co-directed Deep Blue, a natural history feature film about the oceans narrated by Michael Gambon. This film was largely put together with highlights from the NHU's internationally acclaimed series, The Blue Planet, of which Byatt was one of the producers, along with Alastair Fothergill and Martha Holmes. His most recent project is Planet Earth, an 11-part High-definition TV wildlife series first aired in March 2006.
