= The Lady in the Van =

2015 film directed by Nicholas Hytner

- Theatrical release poster
- Directed by: Nicholas Hytner
- Screenplay by: Alan Bennett
- Based on: The Lady in the Van by Alan Bennett
- Produced by: Nicholas Hytner; Damian Jones; Kevin Loader
- Starring: Maggie Smith; Alex Jennings; Jim Broadbent; Frances de la Tour; Roger Allam
- Cinematography: Andrew Dunn
- Edited by: Tariq Anwar
- Music by: George Fenton
- Production companies: TriStar Pictures; TriStar Productions; BBC Films
- Distributed by: Sony Pictures Releasing International
- Release dates: 12 September 2015 (Toronto International Film Festival); 13 November 2015 (United Kingdom)
- Running time: 104 minutes
- Country: United Kingdom
- Language: English
- Budget: $6 million
- Box office: $41.4 million

The Lady in the Van is a 2015 British comedy-drama film directed by Nicholas Hytner, and starring Maggie Smith and Alex Jennings, based on his earlier memoir and stage play of the same name, created by Alan Bennett.

It was written by Bennett, and it tells the (mostly) true story of his interactions with Mary Shepherd, an elderly woman who lived in a dilapidated van on his driveway in north London for 15 years. He had previously published the story as a 1989 essay, 1990 book, 1999 stage play, and 2009 radio play on BBC Radio 4. Smith had previously portrayed Shepherd twice: in the 1999 stage play, which earned her a Best Actress nomination at the 2000 Olivier Awards, and in the 2009 radio adaptation.

Hytner directed the 1999 stage play at the Queen's Theatre in London's West End. The film was shown in the Special Presentations section of the 2015 Toronto International Film Festival and received largely positive reviews from critics.

== Plot ==
In 1970, writer Alan Bennett moves into a wealthy suburb of Camden. Soon afterwards, he meets Miss Mary Shepherd, an irritable, eccentric, unsanitary, and religious homeless woman living in an old Bedford van, who squats outside multiple houses in Bennett's street of Gloucester Crescent. Social workers frequently check in with her, and other neighbours on the street frequently bring Miss Shepherd presents or food.

One day, a couple of youths scare Miss Shepherd, shaking the van and yelling at her, which causes her to wake from a nightmare she was having of a long ago traffic accident. The incident with the boys worries Alan, so he mentions at a meal with neighbours an idea to let her park in his drive. Though initially hesitant, a wealthy neighbour buys her a new van, and Miss Shepherd moves into his driveway, where she proceeds to stay for 15 years, from 1974 to 1989.

Bennett is discreetly gay, and sometimes brings his dates home. Shepherd naively assumes his dates are Communists, meeting secretly with him. During this time, Bennett balances his writing career with watching over Shepherd and providing for his increasingly invalid mother. Though he denies "caring" for anyone, he slowly becomes aware of his growing friendship with Shepherd. Bennett often imagines himself having philosophical discussions with himself.

Bennett discovers her fluency in French, which she learnt while studying the piano in Paris. Despite this, she has an extreme aversion to all music. When asked why, she explained that when she was a novice nun, left alone in a room with a piano she started to play a classical piece. She was forbidden to play it again. Bennett also discovers that she had driven an ambulance during the 1939 blackout in WWII, played Chopin at The Proms, and attempted to become a nun twice. He also finds out her real name: Margaret Fairchild. A mysterious man stops by her van who frightens her every so often, and she gives him money, and she lives in constant fear of the police.

Eventually, Shepherd is sent to a day centre. Bennett takes this opportunity to travel down to Broadstairs and meets with the man she frequently visits, who turns out to be her brother. He explains how he had Mary institutionalised in Banstead (she escaped not long after) and that she studied under the virtuoso pianist Alfred Cortot.

Bennett returns home, to find Shepherd back in her van. She had been scared off by a woman she'd known in Banstead, and had an opportunity to sneak in to play a piano in the centre. She explains that her confessor (in addition to the nuns) had forbidden her from playing, which she was told would help her spirit grow. Before Bennett goes into his house, Shepherd asks to hold his hand. Bennett obliges, and not long after he goes indoors, she dies peacefully in her sleep in her van.

At her funeral, Bennett finds out that after Shepherd escaped from Banstead, she was involved in an accident when her van was hit by a motorcyclist, for whose death she believed herself to blame. She fled the scene, and lived the rest of her life in fear of arrest.

After clearing out and removing the van from his driveway, Bennett decides to write a memoir covering the 20 years he knew Shepherd.

The real Alan Bennett is shown observing the final scene being filmed, in which his younger self unveils a blue plaque on his home dedicated to "Miss M.T Shepherd, The Lady in the Van".

== Cast ==
- Maggie Smith as Miss Mary Shepherd / Margaret Fairchild
  - Clare Hammond as young Margaret Fairchild
- Alex Jennings as both versions of Alan Bennett
- Jim Broadbent as Underwood
- Frances de la Tour as Ursula Vaughan Williams
- Roger Allam as Rufus
- Deborah Findlay as Pauline
- Gwen Taylor as Mum
- Pandora Colin as Mrs. Perry
- Nicholas Burns as Giles Perry
- David Calder as Leo Fairchild
- Marion Bailey as Housekeeper at Convent
- Cecilia Noble as Miss Briscoe
- Claire Foy as Lois
- Clive Merrison as Man in Confessional

=== Cameos ===
Along with de la Tour's prominent role, the surviving principal cast of Bennett's 2006 film The History Boys appear in cameo roles: Samuel Barnett as Donald, Samuel Anderson as a Jehovah's Witness, Stephen Campbell Moore as a doctor, Dominic Cooper as a theatre actor, James Corden as a street trader, Sacha Dhawan as Dr Malik, Andrew Knott as an ambulance driver, Clive Merrison as a man attending confession, Jamie Parker as an estate agent, and Russell Tovey as a rent boy. (Although a child actor named Richard Griffiths appears in the role of Sam Perry, this is not the actor Richard Griffiths from The History Boys, who died in 2013.)

== Production ==
=== Development ===
The Lady in the Van was greenlit on 3 June 2014, with TriStar Productions and BBC Films working together to make the film adaptation of Alan Bennett's West End hit. TriStar won the film rights to handle worldwide distribution, while the BBC was the first to show the film on television in the UK. The involvement of Maggie Smith and Nicholas Hytner was announced simultaneously with the film, but they were attached to the project as early as 9 May (coincidentally, Bennett's 80th birthday). Both of them had collaborated with Bennett in the past: Hytner on The Madness of King George in 1994, and the film adaptation of The History Boys (in 2006); while Smith had portrayed Miss Shepherd in the original theatre production in 1999, and again in a 2009 radio adaptation by BBC Radio 4.

=== Filming ===
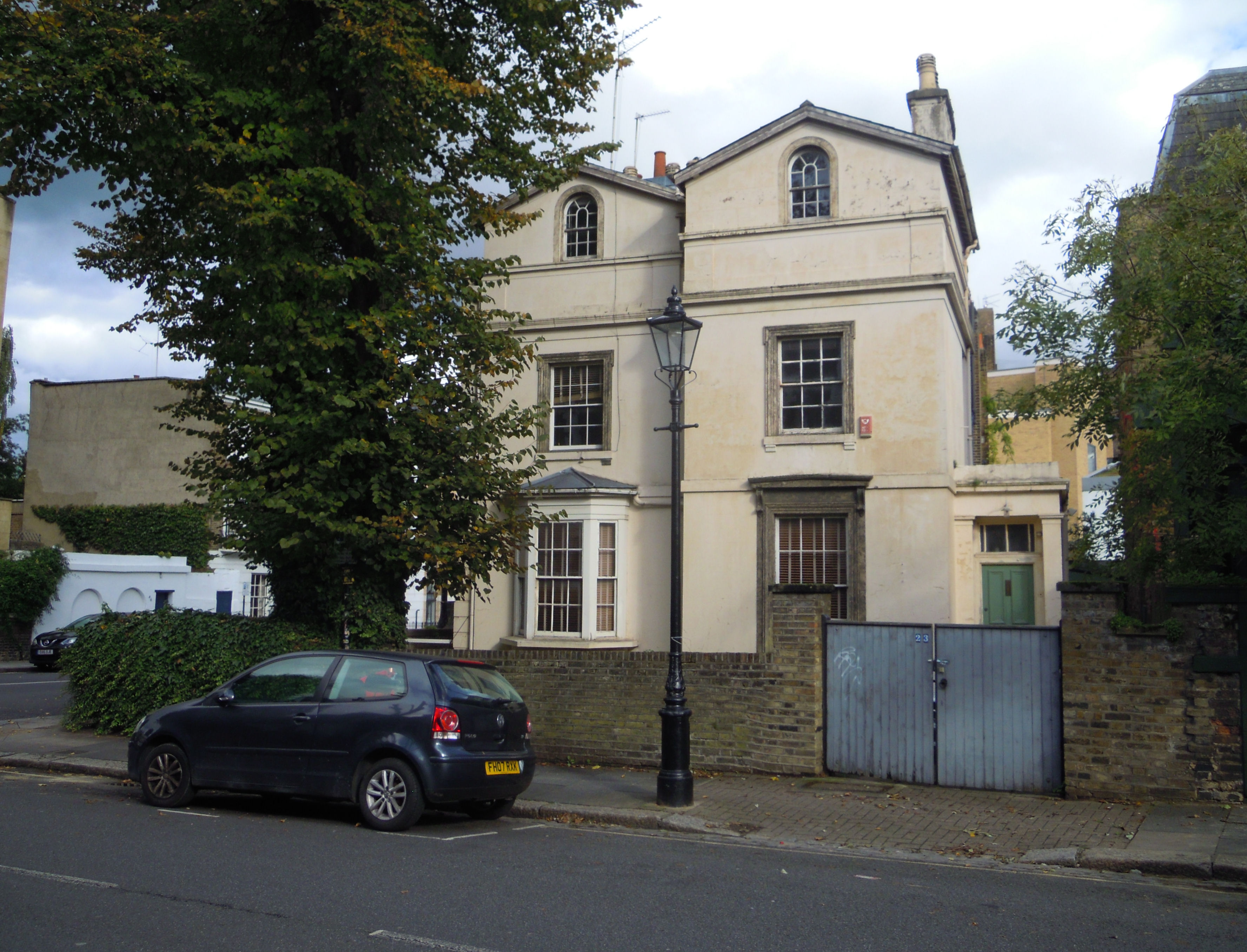
23 Gloucester Crescent in 2019

Principal photography began in October 2014 at 23 Gloucester Crescent (51.53887°N 0.14549°W) Bennett's former house in Camden Town, where the real Miss Shepherd spent 15 years on his driveway. According to Hytner, they never considered filming anywhere else. He recounted that it was entertaining to see the looks on the faces of residents, many of whom were there when the van drove down the crescent.

Filming was a difficult experience for Smith because she spent most of her time confined to one van or another. According to Smith, the van was not the most comfortable of places, and the film was much more concentrated than the play; the stage version was more physically demanding, but Smith admitted it was "a long time ago and [she] could handle it back then." She joked that not a lot of method [acting] was required when one was dressed as [she] was, and in a van.

The production crew filmed for two days in November 2014 in Broadstairs in the Isle of Thanet, Kent, notably Viking Bay, featuring Morelli's Gelato and the Palace Cinema. Producer Kevin Loader described Viking Bay as "the perfect location" and said the area had benefited by £40,000, as the 50-strong crew stayed locally and took advantage of the various restaurants and bars. This was the only filming location outside London, with Buckmaster House in Broadstairs also featuring as Bennett's mother's nursing home in Weston-super-Mare. The scenes which take place in church were filmed at the Church of St Silas the Martyr in Kentish Town, north London.

== Music ==
The film's score consists of classical music by Chopin and others; some additional music was composed by George Fenton. It was released as a soundtrack album through Sony Classical Records, a subsidiary of Sony Music Entertainment, on 6 November 2015 in the United Kingdom. This was followed by an 11 December release in the United States.

== Release ==
The worldwide premiere was held on 12 September 2015, at the Toronto International Film Festival. This was followed by the UK premiere on 13 October at the 59th BFI London Film Festival; which, in turn, was succeeded by the US premiere on 15 November, at the 38th Denver International Film Festival. It was released in UK cinemas on 13 November 2015, while there was a limited theatrical release on 15 January 2016 in the US.

=== Marketing ===
The first trailer was released on 26 February 2015, followed by a teaser poster on 5 March. A new and extended trailer was released on 4 September.

== Reception ==
=== Box office ===
As of 20 March 2016, The Lady in the Van had grossed $US41.3 million worldwide; $US31.3 million in the United Kingdom.

=== Critical reception ===
The Lady in the Van received positive reviews, with particular praise being aimed at Smith's acting. Rotten Tomatoes gave the film a rating of 89%, based on 149 reviews, with an average rating of 7.21/10. The site's consensus states, "Led by a marvelous performance from Maggie Smith, Lady in the Van wrings poignant, often hilarious insight from its fact-based source material." On Metacritic the film holds a score of 70 out of 100, based on 30 critics, indicating "generally favourable reviews".

"Maggie Smith delivers a compelling performance in The Lady in the Van, as Alan Bennett’s play comes to the big screen 15 years after it premiered at the National Theatre."

— Kate Muir, of The Times, following the worldwide premiere at the Toronto International Film Festival.

Guy Lodge, of Variety magazine, attended the worldwide premiere at the Toronto International Film Festival. After the screening, he described Smith's portrayal of Mary Shepherd as "one of the most tailor-made leading roles of her late career". Even though, he says, the film is "low on narrative drive" and "marred by a misjudged final act", "Hytner's amiable [love] fest" is "enlivened by Smith’s signature irascibility; silver-dollar auds should turn up, if not in droves, at least in healthy vanloads". Frank Scheck, of The Hollywood Reporter, also attended the premiere, and like Lodge, he felt Smith's character was the "driving force" behind the film. Not to his surprise, Smith "fully exploits the humour in her character's bizarreness". For example, when her character "receives guidance from the Virgin Mary; her utter obliviousness to her lack of personal hygiene; her hatred of the sound of music that sends her fleeing whenever she hears a note; and her ragtag wardrobe which has been assembled from various dumpsters". In spite of the humour, Scheck praised Smith for "subtly convey[ing] the emotional pain and desperation of [an] addled old woman, especially in the scenes [where she is] taken away by social services and gently treated to a thorough washing, feeding and medical examination".

Ian Nathan, of Empire magazine, awarded the film four out of five stars. Like many, he applauded Smith's "liberating" role, describing her as "shrill and hilarious, but not a joke". He also commended the directing, saying: "Unshowy to a fault, Hytner delivers a fine, moving comedy of English manners between a writer and his eccentric tenant, which slowly deepens into an exploration of human bonds". In a similar fashion, Peter Bradshaw, of The Guardian, awarded four out of five stars and called it an "enjoyable film from Nicholas Hytner". While he felt Smith's performance – "honed from previous stage and radio" adaptations – was "terrifically good", he praised Jennings for giving a "sharp and sympathetic performance as Bennett".

"It’s all good fun, it’s just a shame about the attempts to impose drama on what is essentially a comic character study."

— Kaleem Aftab, of The Independent, speaking of The Lady in the Van.

Donald Clarke, of The Irish Times, awarded the film three out of five stars. He said Smith's role is "indecently appropriate", while de la Tour's is "fabulous", and Allam's is "equally as good" as the latter's. The "problem" with the film is "that, like Miss Shepherd’s van, the story rarely" moves on. It remains "gracelessly the same throughout", with "narrative details" being "plucked like unattached footnotes". When the characters do "open up", during a "bafflingly appalling final scene", you "rather wish the doors had remained shut". Also awarding three out of five stars, Stella Papamichael, of the Radio Times, had similar feelings. She said: Smith and Jennings' characters "veer close to a moment of pathos towards the end [of the film], but [it's not] too profound. The social awkwardness [leaves] a more lingering impression" on the audience.

Jesse Hassenger, of The A.V. Club was critical, stating The Lady in the Van is flawed because the film is "supposed to be revealing Bennett, not Shepherd"; a fact that many "will be reminded of before the film’s end". Smith's character is very commanding on screen, while Jennings "honorably tend[s] to his character’s quiet, semi-closeted homosexuality". No "matter how many meaningful considerations of mortality" are thrown his way; through the screenplay, Jennings "doesn't have a chance" against Smith. On the contrary, Slant Magazine's Elise Nakhnikian said the film is all about the "fastidious, somewhat timid, and reclusive playwright Alan Bennett", and stated the film's "annoying glibness is neatly summarized" by the line: "In life, going downhill is an uphill job".

=== Accolades ===
Year	Award	Category	Nominee	Result
2015	73rd Golden Globe Awards	Best Performance by an Actress in a Motion Picture – Musical or Comedy	Maggie Smith	Nominated
2015	69th British Academy Film Awards	Best Actress in a Leading Role	Maggie Smith	Nominated
2015	43rd Evening Standard British Film Awards	Best Actress	Maggie Smith	Won
