= Vital Spark =

Fictional boat

Fascination with the puffers still continues.

The Vital Spark is the best known name associated with Clyde puffer boats, having been used in the fictional works created by Scottish writer Neil Munro. Several Clyde puffers were used in televised versions of Munro's stories and subsequently for purposes such as events and tourism. As the numbers of surviving puffers diminished the boats Auld Reekie and Eilean Eisdeal were both portrayed as Vital Spark.

== Background ==
Puffers seem to have been regarded fondly even before Munro began publishing his short stories in the Glasgow Evening News in 1905. This may not be surprising, for these small steamboats were then providing a vital supply link around the west coast of Scotland and Hebrides. The charming rascality of the stories went well beyond the reality of a commercial shipping business, but they brought widespread fame. They appeared in the newspaper over 20 years, were collected in book form by 1931, inspired the 1953 film The Maggie, and came out as three popular television series, dating from 1959 to 1995.

== Description ==
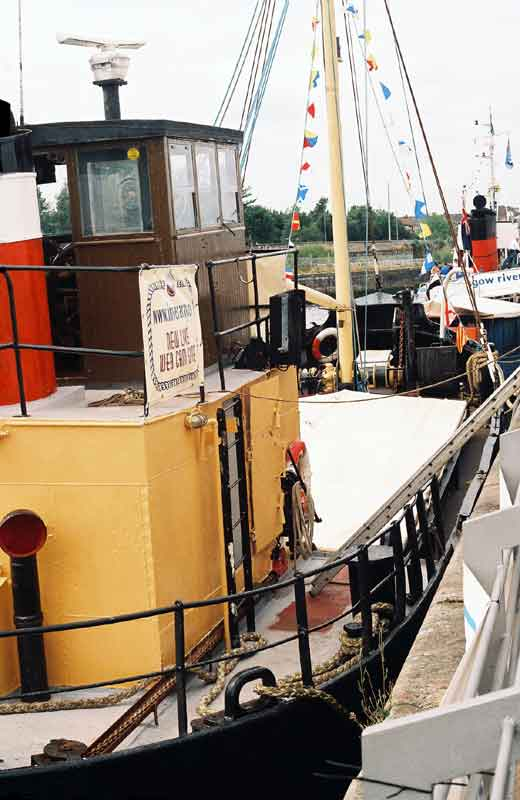
The deck of a "puffer".

In her captain's own (islands accented) words, the Vital Spark is "aal hold, with the boiler behind, four men and a derrick, and a watter-butt and a pan loaf in the foc'sle". The way these steam lighters with their steam-powered derricks could offload at any suitable beach or small pier is featured in many Vital Spark stories, and allows amusing escapades in the small west coast communities. The cargoes carried in the hold vary from gravel or coal to furniture to livestock, the crew's quarters in the forecastle are taken as lodgings by holidaymakers or lost children and the steam engine struggles on under the dour care of the engineer Macphail. Tales are recounted of improbably dramatic missions in World War I. Others scoff at her as a coal gaabbert, reflecting the origins of the puffers, but an indignant Para Handy is always ready to defend his boat, comparing her 6 knots (11 km/h) speed and her looks with the glamorous Clyde steamers. As its captain, the redoubtable Para Handy, often says: "the smertest boat in the coastin' tred".

== TV series featuring Vital Spark ==
The original BBC Series Para Handy - Master Mariner, which ran from 1959–60, starred Duncan Macrae (Para Handy), Roddy McMillan (The Mate), and John Grieve (Dan Macphail, the engineer). Six episodes were made, none of which survive.

In 1963 Macrae, McMillan and Grieve, accompanied by Alex Mackenzie and guitarist George Hill, recorded an album of songs, Highland Voyage. A short film was made to accompany the recording, filmed on board a puffer as it cruised around the Firth of Clyde. Macrae and McMillan appear as The Captain and The Mate, while Mackenzie appears as The Engineer, causing Grieve to move to play The Cook. Although very obviously based on Munro's characters, the names of Para Handy, the Vital Spark, etc. are never mentioned, probably due to copyright issues.

In the second version, The Vital Spark, McMillan took the role of Para Handy, and Grieve reprised his role as Macphail; Walter Carr (Dougie the Mate) and Alex McAvoy (Sunny Jim) completed the crew, and the series ran for three series between 1965 and 1974. The third series, made several years after the first two, was in colour and consisted of remakes of selected earlier episodes.

In 1994 BBC Scotland produced The Tales of Para Handy which starred Gregor Fisher in the lead role alongside Sean Scanlan as Dougie, Andrew Fairlie as Sunny Jim and Rikki Fulton as Dan Macphail. This ran for two series, a total of nine episodes, in 1994 and 1995. The series also featured David Tennant in one of his first acting roles. Alex McAvoy, who played Sunny Jim in The Vital Spark, appears in one episode as a fellow captain of Para Handy in the coastal trade.

== Ships depicting Vital Spark ==
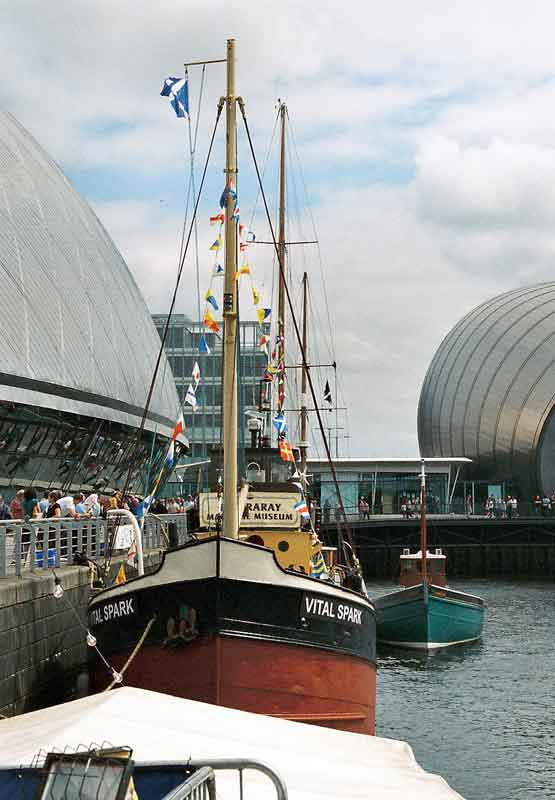
Eilean Eisdeal dressed as the Vital Spark.

The stories sparked considerable interest in the puffers, and many books explore their now vanished world.

The Clyde puffer Gael was used as the Vital Spark in the series aired in 1959.

The puffer Saxon, owned by Walter Kerr was used to film the BBC's 1965-6 television series Para Handy, then scrapped in 1967.

The puffer Skylight was used in the filming for the 1973 and 1974 BBC series. She was renamed Vital Spark for the filming, then returned to haulage renamed as Sitka. The vessel was saved from the breaker's yard in 1977 when it was purchased by a couple from Gourock. The vessel's steam engine was removed to the Maritime Museum in Irvine. From the early 1980s, the engineless boat was moored in Bowling, West Dunbartonshire but within a few years had been vandalised and fallen ito a bad state. There was interest around the potential for it becoming a tourist attraction from both Inverclyde and Bute, despite the cost that would be involved. The vessel was raised in 1987, with the intent for restoration.

The puffer Auld Reekie (VIC 27) was converted to appear as the Vital Spark at the Glasgow Garden Festival which was held in 1988. A community project had helped restore it. She then appeared as the Vital Spark in the BBC's third television series, The Tales of Para Handy. By 2016, she was moored at Crinan awaiting restoration. A three-part BBC Alba television documentary series followed restoration efforts on the vessel.

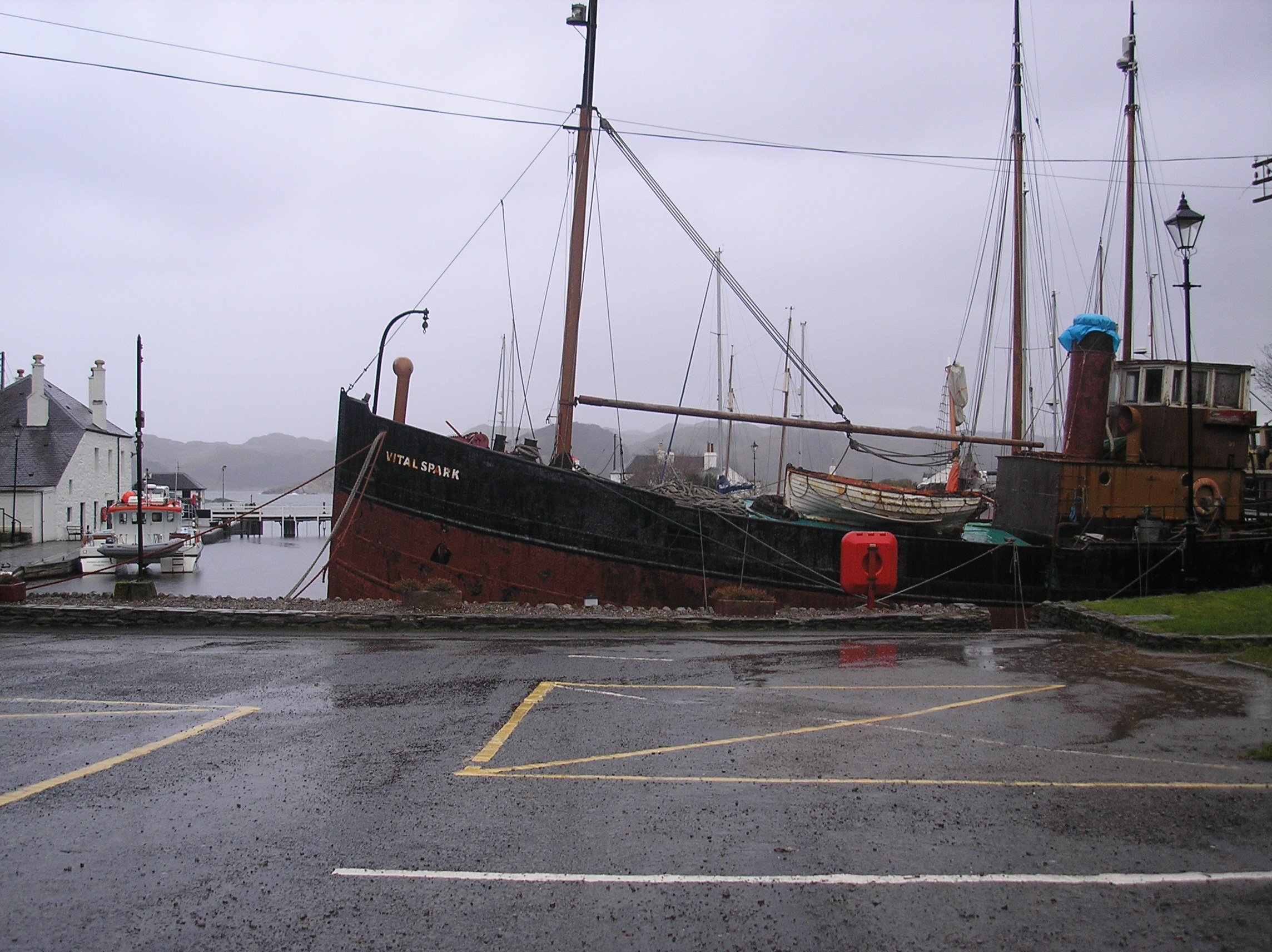
A ship dressed as the Vital Spark at Crinan, in Argyll and Bute.

The vessel VIC 72 later sailed under the name Eldesa. She was purchased by Easdale's laird Chris Nicholson to be used as a tourist attraction. After a £30,000 refit, she was launched in 1984 and renamed Eilean Eisdeal. It continued to operate as a commercial vessel until 1995. She was then on permanent loan to the Inveraray Maritime Museum. The vessel ventured from her home at the Inveraray Maritime Museum to visit the Glasgow River Festival in 2005 and 2006, bearing the name Vital Spark. In 2006 she was re-registered as the Vital Spark of Glasgow. In December 2007, as part of celebrations of the 150th anniversary since the first puffer was launched, the vessel returned to the Forth and Clyde Canal, to be moored at Bowling, West Dunbartonshire. The vessel was used by BBC for filming a programme about the original Vital Spark series. In 2023 it was having further refurbishment.

== In popular culture ==
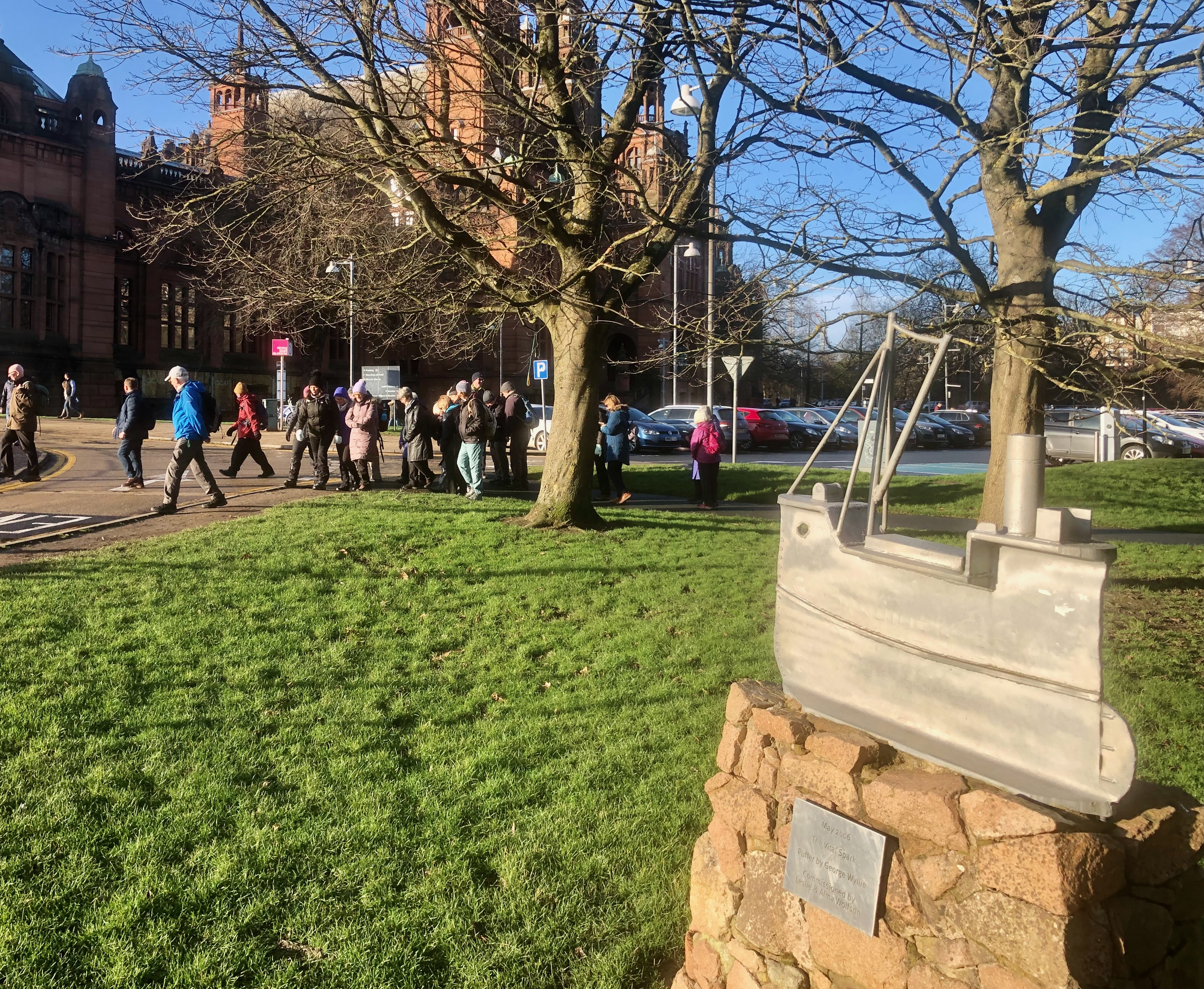
The Vital Spark, puffer sculpture by George Wyllie

The Argyll brewer Fyne Ales, near Inveraray, where the current boat rests and Neil Munro was born, have since 2010 brewed a dark ale that they named Vital Spark in tribute to the series.

A historic pub in Govan was named Vital Spark. A sculpture of a Clyde puffer The Vital Spark by George Wyllie is displayed outside Kelvingrove Art Gallery and Museum.

== See also ==
- List of fictional ships
