= Para Handy - Master Mariner =

Scottish television series, 1959–1960

Para Handy as Master Mariner is a series produced and broadcast by the BBC, set in the western isles of Scotland in the 1930s, based on the Para Handy books by Neil Munro. It starred Duncan Macrae as Peter "Para Handy" MacFarlane, captain of the puffer Vital Spark.

The series followed the Vital Spark's adventures around the coastal waters of Inner Hebrides and the various schemes that Para Handy would get himself and his crew involved in.

The series was first broadcast in 1959, in black-and-white. Having been subsequently discarded, it is no longer available in the BBC archives. The series was the first of several dramatizations of the "Para Handy" stories, being followed by The Vital Spark in 1965–1966 (remade in 1973–1974) starring Roddy McMillan in the title role, and by The Tales of Para Handy in 1994–1995, starring Gregor Fisher.

== Cast ==
- Duncan Macrae as Captain Peter "Para Handy" MacFarlane
- John Grieve as Dan Macphail, the engineer
- Roddy McMillan as Dougie Cameron, the mate
- Angus Lennie as Davie "Sunny Jim" Green

== Episodes ==
No.	Title	Original release date
1	"Para Handy, Master Mariner"	11 December 1959
2	"Para Handy’s Experiment"	18 December 1959
3	"A Happy New Year"	1 January 1960
4	"The Prize Canary"	8 January 1960
5	"Para Handy's Apprentice"	15 January 1960
6	"The Marriage Market"	22 January 1960
