= BBC Scotland =

Scottish division of the British Broadcasting Corporation

- BBC Scotland logo

- BBC Scotland's area within the UK
- TV stations: BBC One Scotland; BBC Scotland; BBC Alba
- Radio stations: BBC Radio Scotland, BBC Radio nan Gàidheal, BBC Radio Shetland, BBC Radio Orkney
- Headquarters: BBC Pacific Quay, Glasgow, Scotland
- Area: Scotland
- Parent: BBC
- Key people: Hayley Valentine (director, BBC Scotland)
- Launch date: 1 January 1923
- Official website: www.bbc.co.uk/scotland
- Language: English, Scots and Scottish Gaelic (Gàidhlig)

BBC Scotland is a division of the BBC and the main public broadcaster in Scotland. Its headquarters are in Glasgow, employing approximately 1,250 staff as of 2017, to produce 15,000 hours of television and radio programming per year. BBC Scotland operates multiple television stations, like the Scottish variant of BBC One, the BBC Scotland channel and the Gaelic-language channel BBC Alba. It also runs radio stations BBC Radio Scotland and Gaelic-language station BBC Radio nan Gàidheal from Stornoway.

It is one of the four BBC national broadcasters, together with the BBC English Regions, BBC Cymru Wales and BBC Northern Ireland. Some £320 million of licence fee revenue is raised in Scotland, with expenditure on purely local content set to stand at £86 million by 2016–2017. The remainder of licence fee revenue raised in the country is spent on networked programmes shown throughout the UK, with BBC Scotland producing over 880 hours worth of programming for UK–wide broadcast on BBC One, BBC Two, BBC Three, CBBC and CBeebies. BBC Scotland output reached on average 94% of Scottish audiences in July 2013.

== History ==
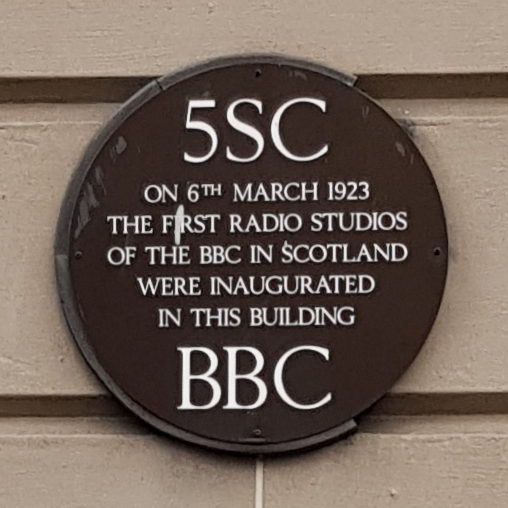
A commemorative plaque on a building on Bath Street, Glasgow

The logo of BBC Scotland between 1988 and 1998.

=== Radio services ===
The first radio service in Scotland was launched by the British Broadcasting Company on 6 March 1923. Named 5SC and located in Bath Street in Glasgow, the services gradually expanded to include the new stations 2BD, 2DE and 2EH, based at Aberdeen, Dundee and Edinburgh respectively. Around 1927, the new Corporation, as the BBC now was, decided to combine these local stations into regions under the generic banner of the BBC Regional Programme. Regional programmes throughout the UK were merged to form the BBC Home Service in 1939, and, with a break for the Second World War, national opt outs remained on the station and its successor BBC Radio 4 until the establishment of a separate BBC Radio Scotland in November 1978.

=== Television services ===
Television in Scotland began formally on 14 March 1952 using the 405-line television system broadcast from the Kirk o' Shotts transmitter. In the beginning, all programmes came from London but some with Scottish content were made using an outside broadcast unit. By 1962, there were plans for television news interview studios in Edinburgh and Aberdeen. Eventually, BBC Scotland established the right to "opt-out" of the network more and more. When BBC Two arrived in Scotland in 1966 (having begun in London two years earlier and spread across the country), broadcasts began in black and white on 405-lines from the Black Hill transmitter. BBC Two upgraded to PAL colour in 1967 (including Scotland) across the UK, with BBC One (network programmes only at first, with local output still in black-and-white) and STV following in December 1969, and in 1971, BBC Scotland's Queen Margaret Drive Studio "A" in Glasgow became one of the first regional studios in Britain to upgrade to colour.

In September 1998, BBC Choice Scotland was launched as BBC Scotland's first digital service. The launch of CBeebies and the CBBC channel gave BBC Scotland a new window for national programming, producing no less than fourteen programmes for them; meanwhile the local CBBC department was increasing its staff fivefold (from 20 to 100) to accommodate the new channels. By 2007, it produced 20% of the combined output of the two national BBC children's channels.

=== Recent years ===
For many years, BBC Scotland tried to increase the number of programmes it made to be shown on the networks. This ambition was greatly aided by the move of BBC Scotland's headquarters in 2007 from Queen Margaret Drive to BBC Pacific Quay where state of the art digital studios were built. In March 2021, a decision was taken by the BBC to relocated jobs and departments from London to other parts of the BBC network, including BBC Scotland. As part of the restructure, the technology team for the BBC moved from London to Glasgow. Productions by the BBC such as The Weakest Link, Newsnight Review and "at least one Saturday night primetime show" would be relocated to Scotland, produced by BBC Scotland in Glasgow.

The BBC's flagship political and debating programme, Question Time, had its permanent base moved to Glasgow in 2009. The relocation of Question Time to Glasgow sparked some controversy, with former executive producer of the programme, George Carey, claiming the move from London to Glasgow would "editorially weaken the show and increase costs".

== Current services ==
BBC Scotland corporate logo used from 2019 to 2022.

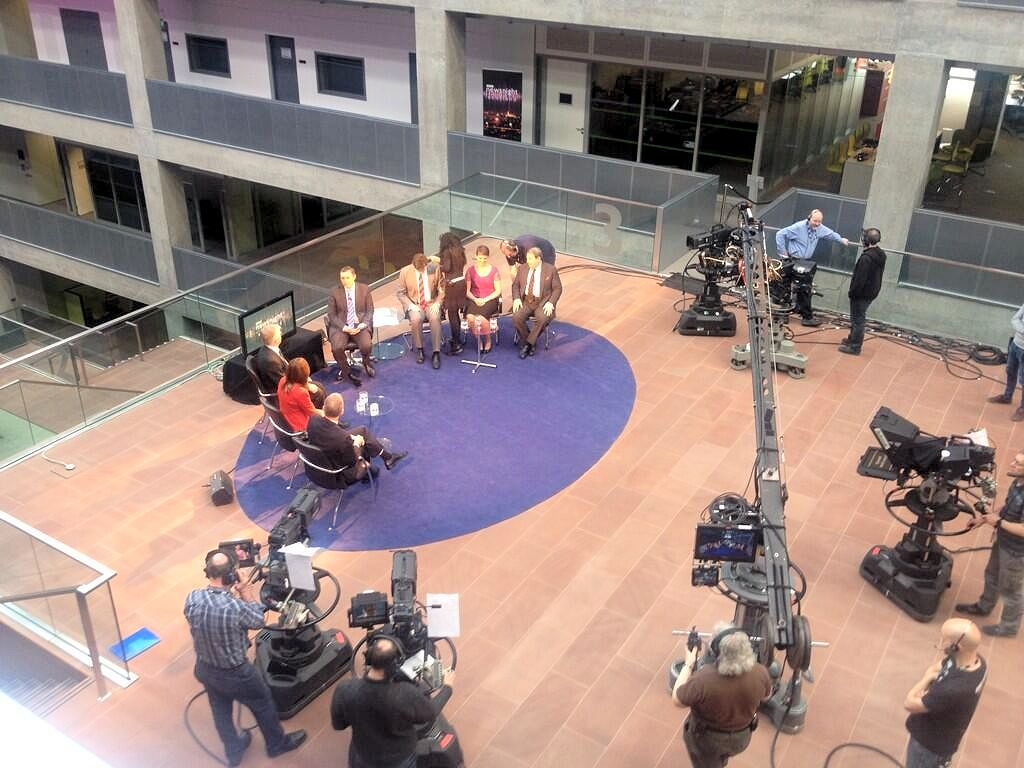
Filming for a broadcast of Newsnight Scotland at BBC Pacific Quay, Glasgow

BBC Scotland broadcasts three television services to Scottish audiences.

=== BBC One Scotland ===
BBC One Scotland is a separate channel able to opt out of the network feed of BBC One to broadcast its own schedule of regional programming in addition to networked productions. The flagship news programme BBC Reporting Scotland is presented by Laura Miller and Laura Goodwin. Additionally, BBC One Scotland broadcasts several Scottish specific broadcasting, such as Sportscene, The Sunday Show and investigation series BBC Disclosure.

=== BBC Alba ===
BBC Scotland operates BBC Alba, broadcasting programming in Gaelic for up to seven hours a day. The channel is a joint partnership between BBC Scotland and MG Alba and is available across the UK on satellite and cable services and Freeview in Scotland only. During downtime, BBC Alba simulcasts Gaelic radio station BBC Radio nan Gàidheal with an in-vision graphical overlay. Prior to digital switchover, some Gaelic programming was carried on BBC Two Scotland, however this ceased following the switchover.

=== BBC Scotland channel ===
The 2016 BBC Charter created a more disparate Scottish offering to audiences, which resulted in a new BBC Scotland channel. On 22 February 2017, director general Tony Hall announced plans to launch a dedicated English-language BBC Scotland channel in 2018, which would replace a BBC Two opt-out called BBC Two Scotland. It would broadcast from 7:00 p.m. to midnight every day and feature a lineup composed entirely of new and archived Scottish programming, including a new hour-long news programme called The Nine. The proposed newscast was considered a response to proposals for a local opt-out of the BBC News at Six. Hall also announced that the BBC would increase its overall spending on factual and drama productions in Scotland by £20 million annually.

The BBC Scotland channel was approved by Ofcom in June 2018, and subsequently launched on 24 February 2019. The channel is allocated £32 million in annual funding, and its SD variant has displaced BBC Four on the Freeview EPG. The BBC Scotland channel commenced broadcasting at 7:00 p.m. on Sunday 24 February 2019.

Programming for the BBC Scotland channel currently includes Debate Night, The Entertainment Mix and Scotland's Home of the Year. The stations flagship news programme, The Nine, was broadcast from February 2019 until December 2024, when it was replaced by a new shorter programme, Reporting Scotland: News at Seven, which airs directly following its sister programme, Reporting Scotland, which is broadcast on BBC One Scotland.

In October 2026, it was announced that the channel will close from spring 2027 and become an online-only service as part of a programme of cuts aimed at saving £500 million at the BBC.

=== Radio ===
BBC Scotland also operates two radio stations covering Scotland: BBC Radio Scotland and BBC Radio nan Gàidheal. The former broadcasts English programming 24 hours a day on the frequencies 92–95 FM and 810 MW. The station has specific programming opt outs for Orkney and Shetland in addition to regional news opt outs for four additional sub regions – North East, Highlands & Islands, South West and Borders. BBC Radio nan Gàidheal in contrast is a Gaelic-language station broadcasting for the majority of the day on 103.5–105 FM and simulcasting Radio Scotland's MW service at other times.

=== Online and interactive ===
BBC Scotland operates a mini site on BBC Online consisting of a portal to Scottish news, sport, programmes and items of cultural interest through BBC Online. The department also provides content from Scotland on these subjects to the website and for the BBC Red Button interactive TV service. BBC Scotland previously offered a podcast download of the top news items of the week and the online streaming of several key sections of output. However following the widespread introduction of the BBC iPlayer service, which allowed the streaming and download of nearly all BBC programmes including news, these services were discontinued as defunct.

BBC's The Social is a digital content stream from BBC Scotland aimed at 18–34 year olds. Working with new and emerging talent, The Social develops daily content on a range of subjects including issues, comedy, music, lifestyle and gaming. Launched in December 2015, The Social won a Royal Television Society Scotland Award for Best Digital Innovation in 2016 and another in 2018 for the shortform drama Kidder. In June 2018, the BBC announced the formation of a third "digital hub" in Glasgow, which will facilitate design and engineering of BBC digital platforms.

== Studios ==
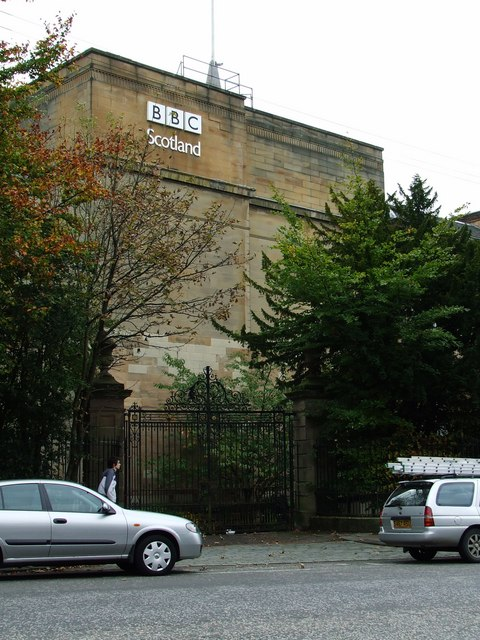
BBC Scotland's former headquarters on Queen Margaret Drive, Glasgow

=== Early studios ===
BBC Scotland began broadcasting in Scotland on 10 October 1923 from the Aberdeen studios in Belmont Street, Aberdeen. The first broadcast for the station was at risk of being impacted by severe gales which resulted in telephone wires being damaged, however, following extensive work by engineers to resolve the damage and associated issues, the broadcast went ahead as planned with minimal issues. Stonehaven did experience issues with the broadcast however, which was later accredited to issues relating to climate.

When the new commercial broadcaster, Scottish Television (STV), was about to arrive in 1957, BBC Scotland managed to produce slightly improved news coverage by a complicated arrangement involving the newsroom in Queen Margaret Drive in the west of the city and the former Black Cat Cinema in Springfield Road in the east where The White Heather Club was made.

=== Glasgow and Edinburgh ===
Upon the launch of the BBC in Scotland in 1923, the service originally occupied Rex House at 202 Bath Street, Glasgow, before moving to properties in Blythswood Square and subsequently in West George Street. In 1929, the decision was made to move the headquarters operation to 5 Queen Street, Edinburgh, where the Edinburgh station had been based since 1924 following a move from the original 79 George Street premises. However, in 1935 the BBC acquired the buildings formerly occupied by Queen Margaret College at North Park House, Queen Margaret Drive, Glasgow, near to the Glasgow Botanic Gardens. Architect James Miller began adapting the buildings for production, administration and radio and television broadcasting in 1936, and Queen Margaret Drive became the BBC's new Scottish headquarters in the same year. BBC Scotland remained based at these premises until the move to Pacific Quay in 2007.

In the early 1960s, the BBC acquired land adjacent to its Queen Margaret Drive base and eventually three colour studios were built together with significant radio facilities and a Film Unit with its own film processing. The BBC Scottish Symphony Orchestra and the BBC Scottish Radio Orchestra had access to a large sound studio – Studio 1, from 1937 until 2006 when it moved from Studio 1 to the newly-rebuilt City Halls in Merchant City area of Glasgow.

Studio One at 5 Queen Street, Edinburgh, was mothballed when it became unaffordable for programme-making after Director General John Birt introduced an internal market at the corporation in the 1990s, but BBC Scotland retained a base there until the move to The Tun in April 2002. The Tun building is near to the Scottish Parliament building and contains television and radio studios in addition to a newsroom.

=== Pacific Quay ===
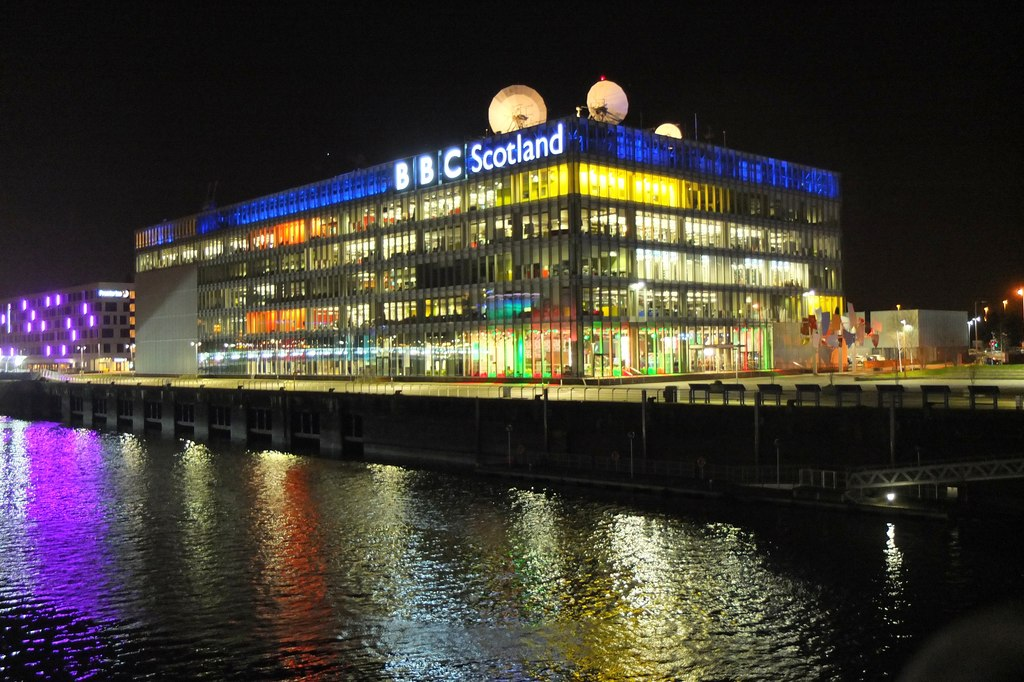
BBC Scotland's current Pacific Quay headquarters in 2016

BBC Scotland's headquarters are currently located at BBC Pacific Quay on the banks of the River Clyde in Glasgow. The BBC had outgrown their old headquarters in Queen Margaret Drive, Glasgow. The need to move to a new location was also in part due to changing technology, with the network having a "desire to move with the times beyond a less than fit for purpose HQ to a new building which would avail us of the latest digital technology to offer improved quality to audiences".

In July 1999 the BBC announced that around 800 staff would be moving to a new building that would be located at Pacific Quay. The BBC held a competition to design a new building with more than seventy companies attracted. By March 2001 there was a shortlist of seven entries.

The studio centre was constructed between July 2004 and August 2006 and was opened in September 2007 by then-Prime Minister Gordon Brown. Designed by David Chipperfield and reportedly costing £188 million, the studio contains three television studios and five radio studios as well as the first HD newsroom used by the BBC. The Pacific Quay building has been the site of protests related to the Israel–Hamas war. On 15 January 2026, about ten pro-Palestinian protesters entered the reception area of BBC Scotland’s headquarters through the main entrance, carrying banners and accusing the corporation of misreporting events in Gaza. Police attended the incident.

=== Other locations ===
In addition to the Glasgow and Edinburgh bases of the broadcaster, BBC Scotland also has offices and studios located in Aberdeen, Dundee, Portree, Stornoway, Inverness, Selkirk, Dumfries, Kirkwall and Lerwick. Of these, the latter two locations operate radio opt-outs from BBC Radio Scotland with BBC Radio Orkney and BBC Radio Shetland while the Aberdeen, Inverness, Selkirk and Dumfries newsrooms produce local radio bulletins for the North East, Highlands & Islands, Borders and South West respectively.

In addition to these premises, BBC Scotland operates a drama productions studio at Dumbarton on the site of a disused whisky distillery. It is the main Scottish drama facilities where programmes such as Still Game and River City are recorded. Also, the BBC Scottish Symphony Orchestra is resident at Glasgow City Halls having been based at Queen Margaret Drive until 2006.

== Programming ==
=== Current programming ===
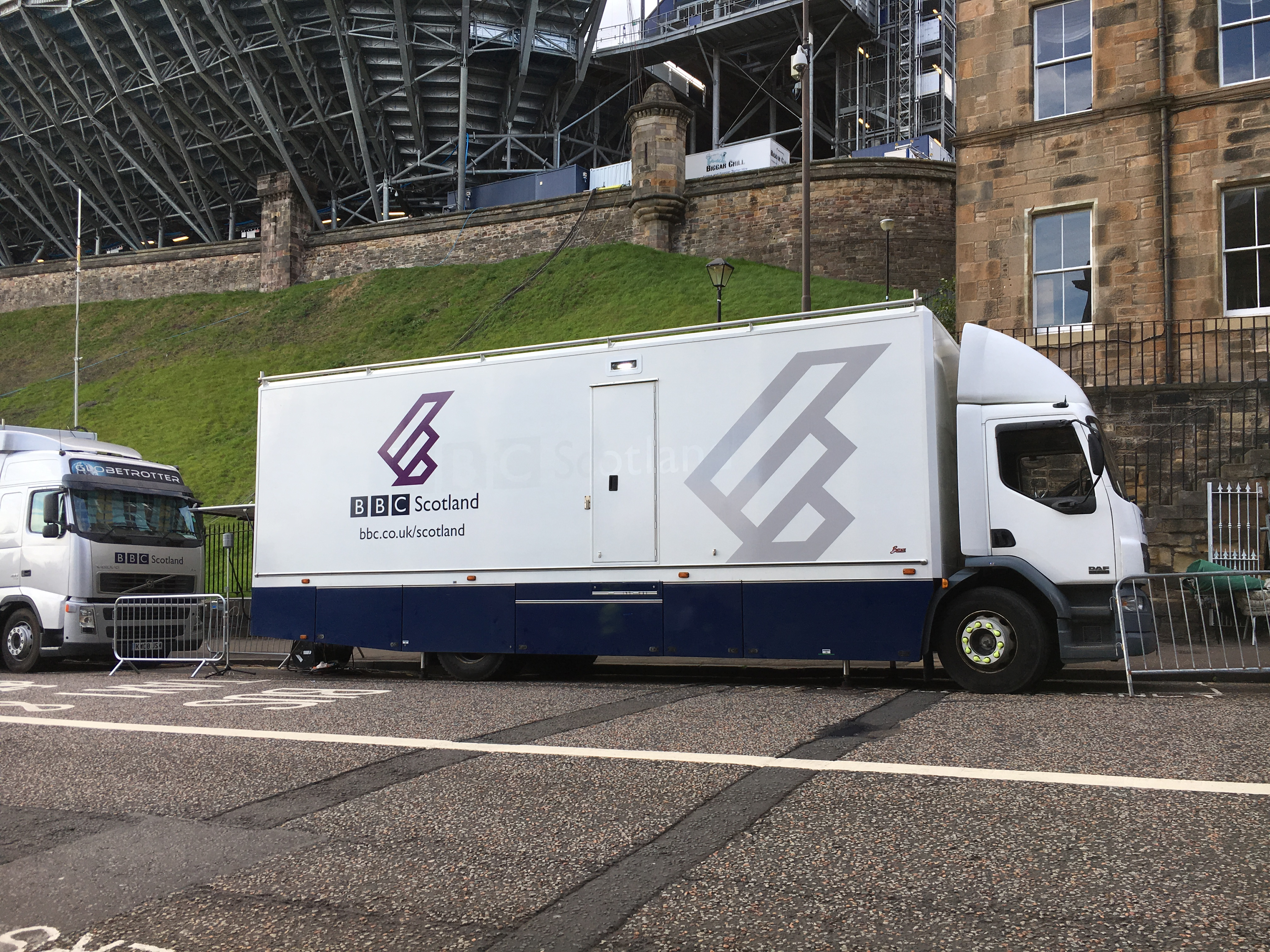
BBC Scotland's "OB2" at Edinburgh Castle for filming of the Royal Edinburgh Military Tattoo

BBC Scotland continues to produce a high number of local programmes for the Scottish audiences. Its flagship news and current affair programmes are Reporting Scotland and Scotland 2016 which provides over an hour of content each weekday. Drama in the form of River City. With sport on Radio Scotland, along with Sportscene, cover a large number of local sports including football, rugby and bowls. BBC Scotland also produces over 20 hours of comedy programmers for radio and television, while features and documentaries is BBC Scotland's biggest output, with The Beechgrove Garden, Landward, Sport Monthly, The Adventure Show, The Mountain, BBC Scotland Investigates and many other covering all aspect of Scottish life. BBC Scotland output was watched by 40.3% of the Scottish television audience in 2013.

Output for the British network has included such recent high-profile dramas as Shetland, Hope Springs, Waterloo Road and Single Father. BBC Scotland also produces a high number of gamesshows which feature The National Lottery Draws. BBC Scotland also produces the Scottish opt-out sections of British-wide programmes such as Sunday Politics and Children in Need.

Until 2010, a high number of Gaelic programmes were broadcast on BBC One and Two Scotland before transferring over to BBC Alba. Its flagship programmes, which both started in 1993, are Dè a-nis? and Eòrpa. Eòrpa hit the headlines in May 2008, specially mentioned in the Scottish Broadcasting Commission's report. "It was intriguing to note that without fail at every one of our public events, BBC2 Scotland's Eòrpa programme was raised, unsolicited, and by non-Gaelic speakers, as an example of a positive, well-respected programme", commented Blair Jenkins, the Chair of the Scottish Broadcasting Commission. It continued to be given a broadcast on BBC Two Scotland as the only Gaelic programme on the channel until 2019 when it moved to BBC Alba.

=== Past programming ===
Over the years, BBC Scotland made a number of well known radio and television programmes both for the BBC networks and for transmission in Scotland only. In television these were known within the BBC as "opt out" programmes, with BBC Scotland given the responsibility for producing Scotland related programming to reflect Scottish culture and life.

In the early 1930s, as the BBC's first Scottish Regional Director, David Cleghorn Thomson, instituted a number of popular radio programmes under series titles such as Frae a' the Airts, What's Intil't and What's Wrong with Scotland?. The close alignment of these programmes with the agenda being promoted by the literary and cultural movement known as the Scottish Renaissance created tension with his superiors over Corporation policy in Scotland and ultimately led to his resignation in 1933.

BBC Scotland has produced two highly controversial programmes, Scotch on the Rocks (1973), a dramatisation of Douglas Hurd's novel, and Secret Society (1987), based on Duncan Campbell's investigation of the secret Zircon spy satellite programme. Scottish Controller Pat Chalmers refused to hand the tapes of the series over to the Government, which led to BBC Scotland being raided by the police and the tapes being impounded.

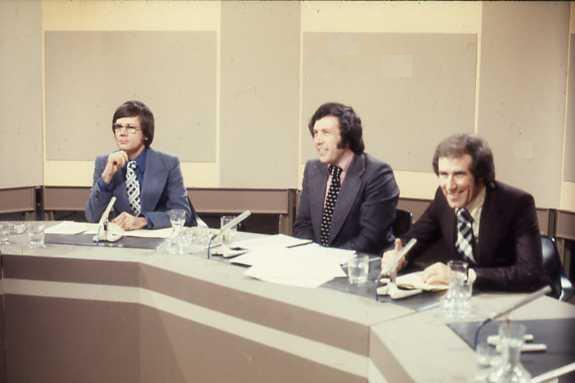
A broadcast of Public Account (1975–1978)

==== Current affairs ====
At teatime in the beginning, there was A Quick Look Round with Leonard Maguire. From 1968, as well as the flagship evening news programme Reporting Scotland, presented by Mary Marquis and Douglas Kynoch, with contributions from Renton Laidlaw in Edinburgh and Donny B. MacLeod in Aberdeen, there were popular current affairs series such as Compass, Checkpoint with Professor Esmond Wright and Magnus Magnusson, Person to Person with Mary Marquis, Current Account, Public Account and Agenda.

==== Drama ====
Throughout the 1920s and '30s, the Scottish National Players provided the BBC Scotland Region with plays for radio broadcast and actors for the BBC's own repertory companies and programmes of spoken verse.

A radio production of Robert Mclellan's verse play The Carlin Moth was broadcast in 1946.

Robert Kemp's The Other Dear Charmer, about the doomed love affair between Robert Burns and Agnes Maclehose, was first broadcast as a radio play on the Scottish Home Service on 22 January 1951, and then as BBC Scotland's first television studio drama on the BBC-tv network on 27 January 1953. A second television dramatisation of the play was produced by Pharic Maclaren for the bicentenary of Robert Burns' birth and first broadcast on the BBC-tv network on Tuesday 27 January 1959. It starred Rona Anderson and Tom Fleming.

Alexander Scott's award-winning verse drama, Untrue Thomas, which translates the return of Thomas the Rhymer to a contemporary setting, was broadcast on the BBC Third Programme in 1953.

Finlay J. MacDonald produced and directed a number of dramas for radio and television. Spindrift, a play by Naomi Mitchison and Denis Macintosh adapted for television by Ada F. Kay, was broadcast in 1959. Sydney Goodsir Smith's The Wallace was broadcast on radio on 30 November in the same year.

Bill Craig's television adaptation of Lewis Grassic Gibbon's novel Sunset Song, starring Vivien Heilbron as Chris Guthrie, was first broadcast in 1971. It was BBC Scotland's first colour television drama.

Fulton Mackay's Dalhousie's Luck, a drama set at the time of the siege of Aberdeen by the Marquess of Montrose in 1644, produced by Pharic Maclaren and with Brian Cox in the title role, was broadcast as part of the BBC2 Playhouse series on 3rd August 1980.

Maggie, a television drama series based on a quartet of books written by Joan Lingard, directed by Michael Kerrigan and with Kirsty Miller in the title role, was first broadcast on BBC 2 between 1981 and 1982.

Bill Bryden was Head of Television Drama at BBC Scotland between 1984 and 1993. Tutti Frutti, a six-part drama series written by John Byrne, was broadcast in 1987. It starred Robbie Coltrane, Emma Thompson, Maurice Roëves, Richard Wilson and Katy Murphy. It won six BAFTAs and brought many of the cast to national prominence. Byrne's second six-part drama series, Your Cheatin' Heart, set in the Glasgow country music scene and starring John Gordon Sinclair, Ken Stott and Tilda Swinton, was broadcast in 1990.

Shadow on the Earth, written by David Kane and directed by Chris Bernard, about two boys in a West Lothian mining village who suspect that their neighbour is an alien, was broadcast as part of the Screen Two anthology series on 13 March 1988.

Other drama series produced by BBC Scotland include Hamish Macbeth, Monarch of the Glen, and Sutherland's Law.

==== Music ====
'Scotland's Music: A Radio History', written, researched, and presented by composer and musicologist John Purser, was broadcast in 30 episodes on BBC Radio Scotland in 1992, and in an expanded version of 51 episodes in 2007.

==== Culture ====
A shortened version of Hugh MacDiarmid's poem A Drunk Man Looks at the Thistle (1926) was broadcast in 1954. A reading of the full poem by the actor Tom Fleming was broadcast in the BBC's Saturday Night Theatre series in 1976, and repeated on Radio 3. Dave Batchelor produced a three-hour programme, broadcast from Studio One, Queen Street, on MacDiarmid to mark the centenary of his birth, with 'A Drunk Man Looks at the Thistle' set to music by William Sweeney and some of his lyrics set to music by Ronald Stevenson. Other contributors included Norman McCaig and Gerda Stevenson.

Joe Corrie's popular radio adaptation of Tam o’ Shanter was broadcast at least half a dozen times on Burns Night, over a period of forty years.

The Garden Beyond, Douglas Eadie's film about the poet William Soutar, was broadcast in 1971 in the BBC Omnibus series.

Billy Kay's radio series, 'Odyssey', broadcast in 1979, was a ground-breaking work of oral history capturing the diverse experiences of men and women across Scotland, including migrants from Donegal, Kintyre fishermen, Lithuanians in Lanarkshire, Dundee jute workers, Shetland whalers, Tiree emigrants to Canada, and servicemen trying to exercise their land rights on returning to Knoydart after the Second World War.

In 1991, Sorley MacLean appeared on Muriel Gray's television series, The Munro Show, providing Gaelic language input, etymology, and pronunciation guides for Scottish mountain and hill names.

==== Comedy ====
The Vital Spark, a television series based on Neil Munro's Para Handy stories set on the West Coast of Scotland in the 1930s, was broadcast between 1965 and 1974. It starred Roddy McMillan as Peter "Para Handy" MacFarlane, captain of the puffer 'Vital Spark', John Grieve as Dan Macphail, the engineer, Walter Carr as Dougie Campbell, the mate, and Alex McAvoy as Davie "Sunny Jim" Green.

Many other comedy series have been made by BBC Scotland, including Scotch and Wry, Rab C. Nesbitt, Naked Video, The Karen Dunbar Show (2003 - 2006) and Still Game. Recent BBC Scotland comedy shows include Two Doors Down and Mountain Goats.

== Controllers and heads ==
Directors and Controllers of BBC Scotland:

- Herbert A. Carruthers (1923), Glasgow 5SC Station Director
- David Cleghorn Thomson (1926–33), Northern Area Director (incl N. Ireland), then from 1928 Scottish Regional Director
- Moray McLaren (1933)
- Melville D. Dinwiddie (1933–57), Controller, Scotland from 1948
- Andrew Stewart (1957–68)
- Alasdair Milne (1968–73), later BBC Director General
- Robert Coulter (1973–75)
- Alastair Hetherington (1975–78), former editor of The Guardian newspaper
- Patrick Ramsey (1978–82)
- Patrick Chalmers (1982 – December 1991)
- John McCormick (January 1992 – April 2004)
- Ken MacQuarrie (April 2004 – 2016), Director, Scotland from 2009
- Donalda MacKinnon (December 2016 – October 2020)
- Steve Carson (October 2020 – October 2024)
- Hayley Valentine (October 2024 – present)

== See also ==
- Scottish Broadcasting Commission
- Audience Council Scotland
- Saorview
- Public Account
- BBC Reporting Scotland
