= Para Handy =

Fictional skipper in stories by Neil Munro

Para Handy is a character created by the journalist and writer Neil Munro in a series of stories published in the Glasgow Evening News between 1905 and 1923 under the pen name of Hugh Foulis. He is the crafty Gaelic skipper of the Vital Spark, a Clyde puffer (steamboat) of the sort that delivered goods from Glasgow to Loch Fyne, the Hebrides, and the coast of Argyllshire and Inverness-shire in the early 20th century.

The character's proper name is Peter Macfarlane. Para Handy is a nickname from "Pàra Shandaidh", which means "Peter (Peadar) son of Sandy" in Gaelic.

The stories partly focus on his pride in his ship, "the smartest boat in the tred" which he considers to be of a class with the Clyde steamers, but mainly tells of the "high jinks" the crew gets up to on their travels. He had at least one crossover with Munro's other popular character, Erchie MacPherson of Erchie, My Droll Friend.

The other principal characters who form the crew of the Vital Spark are:

- the subtly effete engineer Dan Macphail,
- the superstitious ship's mate Dougie (one inconsistency in the stories is that Dougie the mate has the choice of two surnames, Cameron or Campbell),
- the lazy deckhand is known as The Tar (real name Colin Turner) and
- the young squeezebox-playing deckhand Sunny Jim (real name Davie Green), who is cousin to The Tar and replaces him.

Also featured is Hurricane Jack (real name John Maclachlan), Para Handy's rather outrageous adventurer friend.

Key points of friction among the crew are transporting ministers of the church (bad luck), transporting gravestones (bad luck), and the small boats carrying passengers across the Clyde in Glasgow called the Cluthas (in Para Handy's view, the lowest of the low in Clyde shipping), and Macphail's taste for bodice-ripping women's fiction.

== Stories ==
The stories are set in the Firth of Clyde, Loch Fyne and occasionally the Western Isles of Scotland. The stories are known for their humour and also for their evocation of a lost era in the life of these coastal communities when they depended completely on the water and not, as now, on road transport and the ferry service. This was a time when Gaelic was still spoken by some as their native language and everyone in the community was known to all, for good or ill. The church (the kirk) was much more significant in community life and a lot of humour in the stories is derived from scriptural misquotations, which contemporary readers, with their thorough knowledge of the Bible, would have understood. Reference is also made to schisms in the kirk, with the same humour, which could sting those who were overserious in defense of their splinter denomination.

The stories give an insight into the life and attitudes of the Firth of Clyde, its sea lochs and the city of Glasgow. They were written as occasional pieces in the "Looker On" column in the "Glasgow Evening News" and were designed to be recognizable to Glaswegians with Highland backgrounds and also those who were city-bred but regularly escaped the smoke to go "doon the water" to the Clyde resorts of Rothesay, Millport, Dunoon and Tighnabruaich. The Vital Spark also makes it to Arran and Loch Fyne, which were more adventurous destinations but also accessible to city dwellers by the railway steamers that Para Handy often envies. Some of the stories were written during the First World War and give insight into the home front of the time, casting it always in a humorous light.

== Published collections ==
The stories remain perennially popular and have been regularly reprinted since their first appearance. There are various miscellaneous collections, but the main ones are the three overseen by Munro himself and several more latter-day ones.

- The Collected Stories from The Vital Spark (1906)
- In Highland Harbours with Para Handy (1911)
- Hurricane Jack of The Vital Spark (1923)

All three of these collections have been gathered together and reissued in single volumes:

- Neil Munro's Para Handy (Seanachaidh, 1986)
- The World of Para Handy (Seanachaidh, 1990)

The Para Handy Complete Edition (Birlinn, 1992), introduced and annotated by Brian D. Osborne and Ronald Armstrong, contains 18 previously uncollected stories in addition to those above. In 2001 another story was rediscovered and has been included in all subsequent reprints.

== Film ==
The Para Handy stories were the inspiration for the 1954 Ealing comedy, The Maggie (retitled High and Dry in the US), directed by Alexander Mackendrick.

== Television ==
There have been three television adaptations of the Para Handy tales, all for the BBC:

Character	Para Handy - Master Mariner 1959, in black & white	The Vital Spark 1965–66 in black & white 1973–74 in colour	The Tales of Para Handy 1994–1995
Peter 'Para Handy' Macfarlane	Duncan MacRae	Roddy McMillan	Gregor Fisher
Dan Macphail	John Grieve	John Grieve	Rikki Fulton
Dougie the Mate	Roddy McMillan	Walter Carr	Sean Scanlan
Davie 'Sunny Jim' Green	Angus Lennie	Alex McAvoy	Andrew Fairlie

The earlier series updated the stories by giving them contemporary settings. The last series is set between the world wars.

== Theatre ==
- In 1995 Vital Spark Productions toured Scotland with a production of A Para Handy Wireless Show adapted by Gordon Neish and directed by Steven McNicoll.
- In 2007 the Warehouse in Lossiemouth staged a series of three plays, The New Tales of Para Handy, which are now available on DVD.
- In 2011 Eden Court & Open Book presented a Scottish Tour of Para Handy – A Voyage Round the Stories of Neil Munro. The tour began in September 2011 at the Eden Court Theatre, Inverness, and went on to HMT Aberdeen, the Glasgow Theatre Royal, and the Edinburgh Festival Theatre.

== Literary sequels ==
The Dunoon-based freelance author Stuart Donald, also manager of the Cowal Highland Gathering, published two volumes of new stories of the Vital Spark and her crew. He faithfully recreated the style of Munro's originals in Para Handy Sails Again (1995) and Para Handy All at Sea (1996), which were collected together as the Complete New Tales of Para Handy (2001, republished 2011). Sadly, Donald died in September 2000 of cancer before completing the third of his planned trilogy. Before these, Donald also authored Para Handy's Scotland: In the Wake of the Vital Spark (1994, republished 2013), a non-fiction exploration of the background of the original stories.
