= The Tales of Para Handy =

Scottish television series, 1994–1995

- Title screen capture
- Created by: Neil Munro
- Starring: Gregor Fisher; Rikki Fulton; Carolyn Pickles; Sean Scanlan; Andrew Fairlie; Paul Young
- Music by: Phil Cunningham
- Country of origin: Scotland
- Original language: English
- No. of series: 2
- No. of episodes: 9

Original release
- Network: BBC1
- Release: 31 July 1994 – 21 August 1995

The Tales of Para Handy is a Scottish television series set in the western isles of Scotland in the 1930s, based on the Para Handy books by Neil Munro. It starred Gregor Fisher as Captain Peter "Para Handy" MacFarlane, Sean Scanlan as first mate Dougie Cameron, Rikki Fulton as engineer Dan Macphail and Andrew Fairlie as Sunny Jim. These four made up the crew of the puffer Vital Spark which was employed by the Campbell Shipping Company, headquartered in Glasgow and run by Andrew Campbell (Paul Young), Para Handy's brother-in-law and owner of the Vital Spark.

The series followed the Vital Spark's adventures around the coastal waters of west Scotland and the various schemes that Para Handy would get himself and his crew involved in. These involved transporting a bull aboard the Vital Spark, trying to marry Sunny Jim off, avoiding the sale of the Vital Spark by Campbell and being held hostage at gunpoint by religious extremist Donald MacDonald (Iain McColl).

Most of the guest stars in the series were well known faces in Scottish comedy and had starred in the sitcom Rab C. Nesbitt, which also stars Gregor Fisher in the title role. An episode of the second series, "Para Handy's Piper", guest starred future Doctor Who actor David Tennant in one of his early acting roles.

The music for the series, including the theme, was written and composed by Scottish folk musician Phil Cunningham. The theme tune is a composition entitled "Manus Lunny's Terracotta Plower Pop".

It ran from 31 July 1994 to 21 August 1995 on BBC1 for a total of nine episodes.

The ship featured in the series is being restored at Crinan Boatyard on the Argyll coast and has reverted to her original name, Auld Reekie.

== Cast ==
- Gregor Fisher as Captain Peter "Para Handy" MacFarlane
- Rikki Fulton as Dan Macphail
- Carolyn Pickles as Lady Catherine Ramsay
- Sean Scanlan as Dougie Cameron
- Andrew Fairlie as Davy "Sunny Jim" Green
- Paul Young as Andrew Campbell
- Sally Howitt as Miss Kelly
- Gilbert Martin as Captain Angus
- Joanne Bett as Susan
- Tony Curran as Donald
- Alyxis Daly as Margaret

== Episodes ==
=== Series 1 (1994) ===
Episode	Title	First aired
1	"Para Handy, Master Mariner"	31 July 1994
The crew of the Vital Spark are entrusted with transporting some queer cargo including a double bed and a prize Highland Bull -and trouble is never too far away.
Guest stars: Bob Docherty (Farmer Macpherson), Marillyn Gray (Charity Organiser), David Ross Kinnaird (Councillor), Grant Smeaton (MacTaggart), Michelle Waering (Mrs. Strachan), Ricky Ferguson (John), Ronald Simon (Constable), Michelle Gomez (Mother), George Doherty (Telegram Man), Ron Bain (Dougal), Keith Bayliss (Sailor), Graham McGregor (Shopkeeper)
2	"Para Handy, Poacher"	7 August 1994
A spot of poaching lands Para Handy and his unfortunate crew in jail but also reunites Para with his childhood friend, Lady Catherine Ramsey.
Guest stars: Ian McCulloch (Laird Fergusson), Billy Riddoch (Sergeant), Gavin Mitchell (Captain)
3	"Salvage!"	14 August 1994
In the aftermath of a storm Para Handy and his hapless crew rescue a drifting boat intending to claim salvage. But the abandoned vessel contains a very nasty surprise.
Guest stars: Joseph Greig (John McCallum), June Watson (Mrs. McCallum), Jonathan Watson (Coastguard Officer), Ronnie McCann (Junior Officer), David McKay (1st Semaphore Man), Ray Jeffries (2nd Semaphore Man)
4	"A Night Alarm"	21 August 1994
A spot of engine trouble sees the luckless crew marooned in a small island village, where Para tangles with the drunken town bully and indulges in a spot of matchmaking.
Guest stars: Clive Russell (McVicar), Gordon Kennedy (Constable McLeod), Anne Kristen (Mrs. McLean), Ashley Jensen (Catriona McLean), Andrew Dallmeyer (MacDonald), Jane McCarry (Flora)
5	"The End of the World"	28 August 1994
After reading his tea leaves, Dougie predicts doom and disaster for those on board the Vital Spark. Para dismisses his predictions until one by one the omens start coming true.
Guest stars: Freddie Boardley (Captain Montand), Jason Broe (Bert Stephen), David O'Hara (Robert Grant), Brian Pettifer (Newspaper Editor), Iain McColl (MacDonald the Preacher), Robert Carr (Magistrate)
6	"Treasure Trove"	4 September 1994
Threatened by the march of modern technology it takes all of Para’s cunning, plus the help of a large beached whale, to keep him and his disaster prone crew in steady employment.
Guest stars: Alex McAvoy (Ichabod McGrain), Martyn James (Jim Donachie), Alexander Morton (John Cruickshank), Stewart Preston (Hugh Rafferty), Andrew Barr (Mr. Buchanan), Mark Cox (Whale Watcher)

=== Series 2 (1995) ===
Episode	Title	First aired
1	"The Fortune Teller"	31 July 1995
Lured by a gypsy's prophecy of Spanish gold from a wrecked galleon, the crew embarks on a hunt for the treasure – with literally explosive consequences.
Guest stars: Barbara Rafferty (Madame Isis), Vincent Friell (Landlord), Finlay McLean (Photographer), Alec Heggie (MacRae), Sandy Welch (Auctioneer)
2	"Para Handy's Piper"	7 August 1995
When the crew are entrusted with delivering a piper to a wedding, they pick up an imposter who wants to elope with the bride and the course of true love doesn't run smoothly.
Guest stars: David Tennant (John McBryde), Iain Cuthbertson (Angus Monroe), Karen Westwood (Maire Monroe), Andrew Robertson (Hugh McDiarmind), Michael Carter (Rankin), Robert McIntosh (Sergeant Hamilton), Ronald Simon (Constable)
3	"The Malingerer"	21 August 1995
After bragging his boat can out-run any other, Para Handy is tricked into a race at sea with a rival shipping company. Once again he proves it's savvy, not speed, that counts.
Guest stars: Lou Hirsch (John Cody), Malcolm Shields (Captain McRae), John Stahl (Dr. Robertson), Kevan McKenzie (Coastguard), John Comerford (MacGregor), Dave Anderson (Henry Fleming)

== Home video ==
The first six episodes were officially released on UK VHS immediately following their original broadcast. The UK also saw release of the entire series on a 3-DVD set on 9 October 2017.

== See also ==
- Para Handy - Master Mariner 1959–1960 series
- The Vital Spark 1960s series
