= John Grieve (actor) =

Scottish actor

- Born: 14 June 1924; Maryhill, Glasgow, Scotland
- Died: 21 January 2003 (aged 78); Glasgow, Scotland
- Occupation: Actor

John Grieve (14 June 1924 – 21 January 2003) was a Scottish actor, best known as the engineer Macphail in the BBC adaptation of Neil Munro's Para Handy stories, Para Handy - Master Mariner (1959–60), returning to that role in the BBC Scotland version, The Vital Spark (1965–67, 1973–74).

Born in Maryhill, Glasgow, Grieve attended the Royal Scottish Academy of Music and Drama, before joining the Citizens Theatre in 1951. Grieve worked in variety alongside many familiar Scottish comedians, including Stanley Baxter and Jimmy Logan. Although principally known for his comic roles, he appeared in drama films such as The Thirty-Nine Steps (1978), Eye of the Needle (1981) and the BBC docudrama Square Mile of Murder (1980). His stage roles include the part of the King's Jester in the premier of The Burning (1971) by Stewart Conn.

He had a brief recurring role as Frank Marker's probation officer in the Thames Television series Public Eye. He played Sandy Duncanson in BBC's adaptation of Neil Munro's The New Road, in a BBC drama about the Union of the Parliaments in 1707 he played John Hamilton, 2nd Lord Belhaven and Stenton who delivered a controversial speech against the Union, and appeared on BBC Scotland's Hogmanay celebrations, one of which (Live into 85) was broadcast nationally from Gleneagles and became notorious for Grieve, apparently worse the wear with alcohol, unable to recite a brief poem and collapsing into laughter, along with other shambolic incidents featured in the same programme. The BBC as a result did not broadcast Hogmanay-themed programmes thereafter.

He appeared in two episodes (eleven years apart) in the television series All Creatures Great and Small as Dr. Harry Allinson, whose practice was next door to Skeldale House.

== Theatre ==
| Year | Title | Role | Company | Director | Notes |
|---|---|---|---|---|---|
| 1972 | Kidnapped | Cluny MacPherson | Lyceum Theatre, Edinburgh | Bill Bryden | adaptation by Keith Dewhurst |
| 1981 | Let Wives Tak Tent | Allan | Scottish Theatre Company | David Thompson | play by Robert Kemp |
| 1986 | Ane Satyre of the Thrie Estaites | Deceit | Scottish Theatre Company | Tom Fleming | play by Sir David Lyndsey, adapted by Robert Kemp |
| 1989 | The Cherry Orchard | Feers | Lyceum Theatre Company, Edinburgh | Hugh Hodgart | play by Anton Chekov, adapted by Stuart Paterson |

== Filmography ==
| Year | Title | Role | Notes |
|---|---|---|---|
| 1959 | The 39 Steps | Lowrie - shepherd | Uncredited |
| 1961 | Don't Bother to Knock | Bus Conductor | |
| 1978 | The Thirty Nine Steps | P.C. Forbes | |
| 1981 | Eye of the Needle | Inspector Kincaid | |

== Television ==
| Year | Title | Role | Director | Production | Notes |
|---|---|---|---|---|---|
| 1959 | Spindrift | Dougie MacLean (The Goat) | Finlay J. Macdonald | BBC Scotland | play by Naomi Mitchison and Denis Macintosh, adapted for television by Ada F. Kay |
| 1965-74 | The Vital Spark | MacPhail | Pharic Maclaren | BBC Scotland | adapted from the Para Handy stories of Neil Munro |
| 1995 | Hamish Macbeth S1 E1: "The Great Lochdubh Salt Robbery" | Whisky Bob | Nicholas Renton | BBC Scotland | Adapted from the mystery novels of M. C. Beaton |
