= The New Road =

The New Road is a 1914 historical novel by the Scottish writer Neil Munro, which was adapted as a television serial by the BBC. Munro is now mainly remembered as the creator of the comic character Para Handy, but this is regarded as the best of his serious novels.

== Plot ==
The novel is set in 1733. The title refers to General Wade's military road through the central Highlands from Dunkeld to Inverness, symbolic of changes taking place to the Highlands at that time. The central character is Aeneas Macmaster, a young man from Inveraray who travels north to investigate his father's disappearance and presumed death 14 years earlier at the Battle of Glenshiel, during the Jacobite rising of 1719. The novel depicts changes in the Scottish Highlands in the aftermath of the rising.

Like Munro's earlier novel John Splendid, it was a revisionist view of the period, which was critical of the cult of Highlanders and Jacobites, and was sympathetic to Clan Campbell, often seen as the villains of the period. (Munro came from Inveraray, the Campbell's capital.) It may also be slightly derivative of Robert Louis Stevenson's novel Kidnapped, which had a similar setting, and there are parallels between some of the characters.

== Television adaptation ==
The BBC adapted it as a television serial, shown in April 1973 in the Sunday tea-time slot which showed fairly faithful adaptations of classic novels. The script was written by Cliff Hanley. It was directed by Moira Armstrong and produced by Pharic Maclaren. There were five 45-minute episodes: "A Call to the North", "Col of the Tricks", "A Kistful of Muskets", "The Big One" and "A Balance of Accounts".

== Cast ==
- Maev Alexander as Janet Campbell
- David Ashton as Aeneas Macmaster
- John Grieve as Sandy Duncanson
- Tom Watson as Ninian Campbell
- Christine McKenna as Margaret Duncanson
- David Mowat as The Muileach
- Bryden Murdoch as Alan Macmaster
- Jameson Clark as the Landlord.
- Helena Gloag as Meg
- Anne Kristen as Annabell Macmaster
- Bill Henderson as the Highlander
- Mary McCuster as the Slattern
