= Leonard Maguire =

Scottish actor

- Maguire playing "Uncle" in EastEnders
- Born: Leonard Ignatius Maguire; 26 May 1924; Manchester, England
- Died: 12 September 1997 (aged 73); Cordes-sur-Ciel, France
- Children: 3

Leonard Maguire (26 May 1924 – 12 September 1997) was a Scottish stage, television and film actor. He was born in England but lived much of his life in Scotland. Maguire's acting career began in the 1940s.

== Early life ==
Maguire was born in Manchester, England, to Scottish parents. His father was Thomas Maguire, a former consul in Valparaíso, Chile, who was of Irish descent. Maguire's family moved to Antwerp, Belgium in 1926 before moving to Glasgow, Scotland, in 1932. He was educated at St Mungo's Academy in Glasgow. Maguire was one of the founding members of the Glasgow Citizens Theatre in 1943, after being invalided out of the RAF during World War II. He began in the company as an assistant stage manager with walk-on parts.

== Career ==
In 1945, he auditioned for and joined Laurence Olivier's company at the Phoenix Theatre in London, in a production of Thornton Wilder's The Skin of Our Teeth, starring Vivien Leigh. Other productions in which he was cast include Sheridan's The Rivals, starring Edith Evans, and a stage version of Crime and Punishment, starring John Gielgud.

He appeared on stage in numerous plays, including world premieres from Samuel Beckett and Dylan Thomas at the Edinburgh Festival. Maguire won the sought-after Fringe First award three years in a row for solo shows (1976, 1977, 1978); he was the only performer to accomplish this. In 1959, he played Menteith in Finlay J. MacDonald's BBC radio production of Sydney Goodsir Smith's play, The Wallace. During the fifteen years period from 1951, he presented nearly 2,000 radio programmes, which included Scope and Perspective. He was one of the hosts of the television arts programme Tempo in the 1960s.

Maguire appeared as the headmaster in school drama serial This Man Craig. Other television credits include Dixon of Dock Green (1962), Dr. Finlay's Casebook (1963–1970), Z-Cars (1967), The Troubleshooters (1967), The Borderers (1969), Emmerdale Farm (1973), Whatever Happened to the Likely Lads? (1974), The Pallisers (1974), Doctor Who (1980), Rockliffe's Babies (1987), a recurring character in EastEnders as Lou Beale's friend "Uncle" (1986–1988), Rab C. Nesbitt (1990), Bergerac (1991) and Poirot (1993), among many others.

His film credits include The Awakening (1980), The Honorary Consul (1983), The Doctor and the Devils (1985), The Lonely Passion of Judith Hearne (1987), A Dry White Season (1989), and Prospero's Books (1991).

== Personal life ==
Maguire married radio producer Frances Campbell (1917–2008) in the 1960s. After his retirement, Maguire moved to France, settling in the village of Cordes-sur-Ciel, where he died in 1997 after a lengthy illness. He was aged 73. He was survived by his wife and their three children.

== Theatre ==
Year	Title	Role	Company	Director	Notes
1948	Ane Satyre of the Thrie Estaites	Abbot	The Glasgow Citizens' Theatre	Tyrone Guthrie, Moultrie Kelsall	play by Sir David Lyndsay, adapted by Robert Kemp
1972	Kidnapped	Colin Roy Campbell of Glenure	Lyceum Theatre, Edinburgh	Bill Bryden	adaptation by Keith Dewhurst

== Filmography ==
Year	Title	Role	Notes
1980	The Awakening	John Matthews	
1983	The Honorary Consul	Dr. Humphries	
1985	The Doctor and the Devils	Nightwatchman	
1987	Little Dorrit	Knowledgeable Debtor	
1987	The Lonely Passion of Judith Hearne	Doctor Bowe	
1988	The Girl in a Swing	Dr. Frazer	
1989	A Dry White Season	Bruwer	
1994	OcchioPinocchio	Brando's Brother	
1996	Victory	Old Trader McNab	(final film role)
