= Willie Rough =

Play by Bill Bryden

Poster of original production

Willie Rough is a play by Scottish writer and director Bill Bryden, which is often regarded as a landmark of Scottish drama.

Originally a stage play produced by the Royal Lyceum Theatre Company in Edinburgh in 1972, a TV version was shown in 1976 as Play for Today, with a cast including Fulton Mackay and Roddy McMillan.

It is set in a Greenock shipyard around the outbreak of the First World War, and put forward a revolutionary socialist view of events of the time. John Maclean, a Socialist leader who opposed the war, is mentioned several times but never appears in person.
