= Alex McAvoy =

Scottish actor

- Born: 10 March 1928; Glasgow, Scotland
- Died: 16 June 2005 (aged 77); London, England
- Occupation: Actor

Alex McAvoy (10 March 1928 – 16 June 2005) was a Scottish actor known for his roles as Sunny Jim in the BBC Scotland adaptation of Neil Munro's Para Handy stories, The Vital Spark, and as the teacher in Pink Floyd's musical film, The Wall (1982).

As a young man McAvoy enrolled at the School of Art in Glasgow's Renfrew Street before, in the 1950s, joining the Royal Scottish Academy of Music and Drama in Glasgow. As a young actor he played the Citizens Theatre in Glasgow's Gorbals district alongside such future stars as John Cairney and Mary Marquis.

In the earlier part of his career McAvoy ventured into variety and light entertainment and was the first foil to Scottish comedy singer Andy Stewart.

He developed a love of mime and featured in Scottish pantomime, with featured roles at the King's Theatres in both Glasgow and Edinburgh. He later went to Paris to study and work in L'École Internationale de Théâtre Jacques Lecoq.

His many television roles included parts in The Bill, Dad's Army and Z-Cars as well as more serious parts in Sunday night dramas on British television. In the cinema, he memorably played the sadistic schoolteacher in Pink Floyd – The Wall (1982), and also had roles in Country Dance (1970), Venus Peter (1989, as the Beadle) and Strictly Sinatra (2001). He also featured in Pink Floyd's video EP of The Final Cut (1983).

== Theatre ==
Year	Title	Role	Company	Director	Notes
1982	Ane Satyre of the Thrie Estaites	Gude Counsel	Scottish Theatre Company	Tom Fleming	play by Sir David Lindsay, adapted by Robert Kemp

== Filmography ==
Year	Title	Role	Notes
1965	For Whom the Bell Tolls	Soldier	TV series
1970	Country Dance	Andrew	
1972	The Massacre of Glencoe	Narrator	
1972	Joseph and the Amazing Technicolor Dreamcoat	Jacob	
1982	Pink Floyd – The Wall	Teacher	
1983	Pink Floyd – The Final Cut	Husband (Uncredited)	Short Film
1988	The Monkey's Paw	Mr. White	
1989	Venus Peter	Beadle	
1994	The Tales of Para Handy	Ichabod McGrain	TV series (Guest appearance Series 1 Episode 6 Treasure Trove)
2001	Strictly Sinatra	Aldo	(final film role)
