= Pibroch (vessel) =

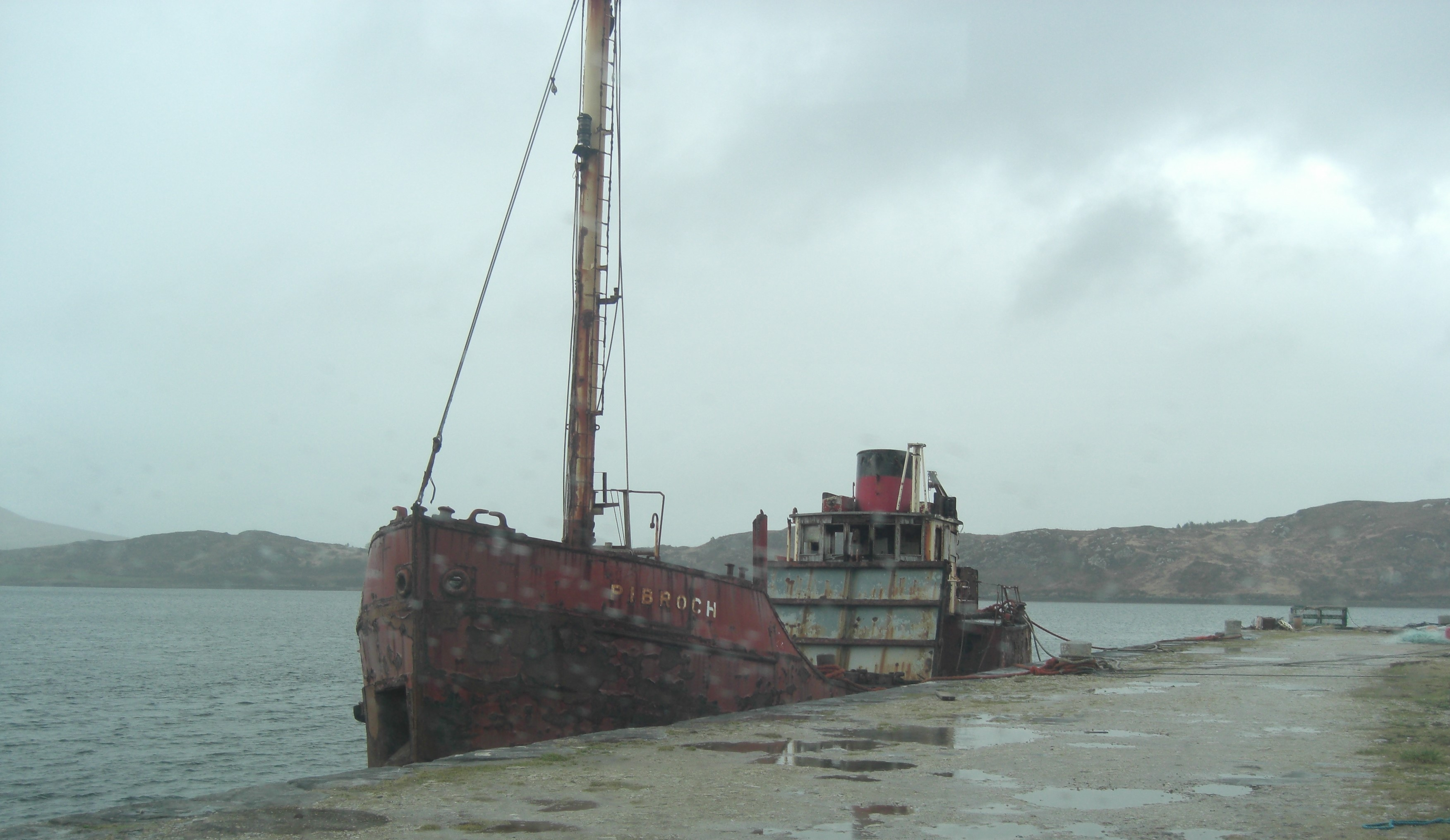

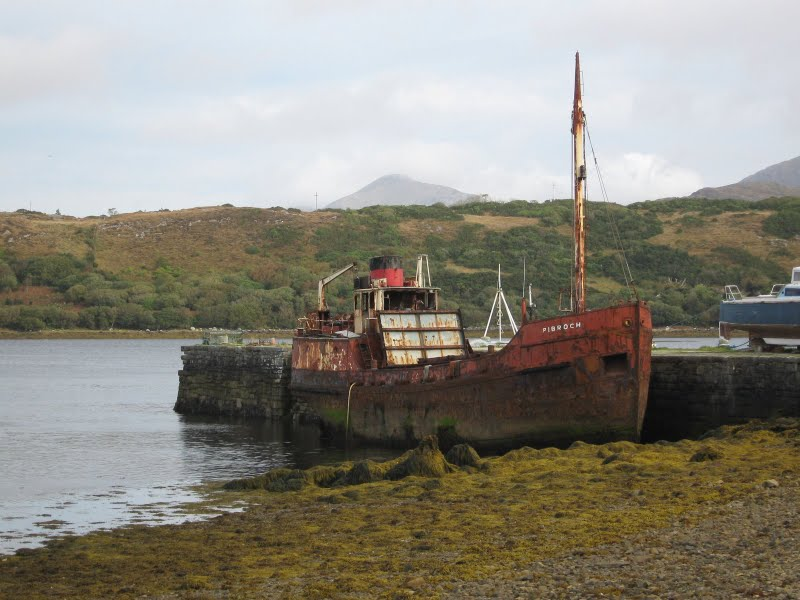
The Pibroch rusting at dock in Co. Galway, October 2008.

The Pibroch was a Clyde puffer that was built in Glasgow during 1957. It was one of the last of that type of vessel to survive. Built at Bowling, Scotland in 1957 as a diesel-engined boat for the Scottish Malt Distillers, she had been lying at Letterfrack, County Galway, Ireland, in desperate need of restoration, since 2002. The Pibroch deteriorated further as time passed, and her bulkheads began to give way. In 2010 she was sold and was subsequently scrapped. A sister-ship, the Julia T., Lies in 30 m of water in Killary Bay some 300 yards off Lettergesh.
