= Angus Lennie =

Scottish actor (1930–2014)

- Born: Angus Wilson Lennie; 18 April 1930; Glasgow, Scotland
- Died: 14 September 2014 (aged 84); Acton, London, England
- Occupation: Actor
- Years active: 1944–2003

Angus Wilson Lennie (18 April 1930 – 14 September 2014) was a Scottish film, television and theatre actor with a 50-year career. His numerous credits include the character of Flying Officer Archibald Ives in The Great Escape, and Shughie McFee in the television soap opera Crossroads. He had largely retired from acting by the early 2000s.

== Early life ==
Lennie was born and raised in Glasgow, receiving formal education there at Eastbank Academy. During his childhood he was a member of the 94th Glasgow (1st Shettleston) Company of Scotland's Boys' Brigade.

Lennie started his career in show business at the age of 14 whilst engaged in an apprenticeship as a stockbroker's clerk, and appeared whilst still a teenager in song and dance acts at the Glasgow Metropole, his diminutive size at 5 ft 1" aiding his nimbleness in performance. After briefly trying stand-up comedy on Scotland's variety circuit post-World War II, and service with Her Majesty's Armed Forces as a National Serviceman, after a period performing in song and dance, and comedy routines, in the English seaside towns along the southeast coast, he decided to become an actor, and took up a trainee position with the Perth Repertory Company in his early twenties, and went on to work with repertory companies in Oxford and Birmingham.

== Television ==
Lennie's earliest major role was as Davie "Sunny Jim" Green in BBC Scotland's comedy series, Para Handy - Master Mariner in 1959–60. Other TV credits include: Target Luna, The Saint (The Fellow Traveller), Doctor Who (in the serials The Ice Warriors and Terror of the Zygons), The Borderers, Z-Cars, Rumpole of the Bailey, Lovejoy, The Onedin Line, All Night Long, Keeping Up Appearances and Monarch of the Glen.

Lennie had a long-running role as cook Shughie McFee in the soap opera Crossroads, which he played from 1974 to 1981. He left the show without his character being formally written out. This infamously led to characters in soap operas disappearing without explanation being classed as "in the kitchen with Shughie McFee."

Like many "resting" actors between engagements he took casual work in other fields. In 1977 he was employed as a barman at the Prince Alfred pub in Formosa Street, Maida Vale.

== Film ==
Lennie's first role in cinema was in Tunes of Glory (1960), and he went on to establish a successful career in the medium as a character actor, often playing plucky wee Scotsman parts in war films such as The Great Escape (1963), 633 Squadron (1964), and Oh! What a Lovely War (1969). He was also in a succession of comedies such as Petticoat Pirates (1961), Operation Snatch (1962) and One of Our Dinosaurs Is Missing (1975). He also appeared alongside Richard Burton in the film The V.I.P.s in 1964.

== Stage ==
Lennie appeared in many stage productions, including A Midsummer Night's Dream and pantomimes.

== Death ==
Lennie died on 14 September 2014 in Acton, West London, aged 84.

== Filmography ==
| Year | Title | Role | Notes |
|---|---|---|---|
| 1960 | Tunes of Glory | Orderly Room Clerk | |
| 1961 | Petticoat Pirates | George | |
| 1962 | Operation Snatch | Vic | |
| 1963 | The V.I.P.s | Metereological Man | Uncredited |
| 1963 | The Great Escape | Fl. Off. Archibald Ives 'The Mole' | |
| 1964 | 633 Squadron | Flying Officer Hoppy Hopkinson | |
| 1969 | Oh! What a Lovely War | Scottish Soldier | |
| 1975 | One of Our Dinosaurs Is Missing | Hamish | |
