= Basuto (1902 ship) =

Historic ship in Scotland

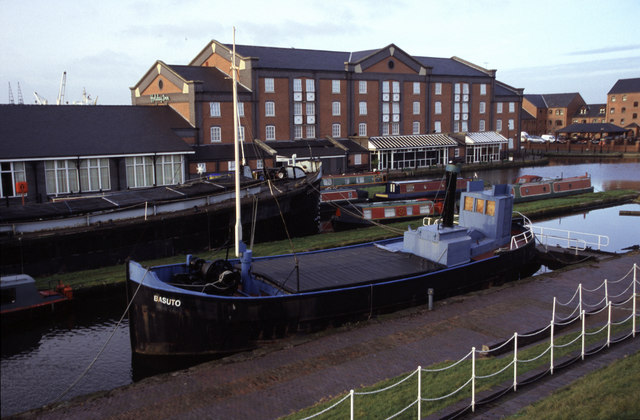
- Basuto at Ellesmere Port

History

- Name: Basuto
- Owner: Manchester Dry Docks Ltd
- Builder: William Jacks & Co
- Completed: 1902

General characteristics
- Tonnage: 64
- Length: 65.9 feet (20.1 m)
- Beam: 15.74 feet (4.80 m)

Basuto is a Clyde puffer built in 1902 by William Jacks & Co. in Port Dundas in Scotland for its own use on the Forth and Clyde Canal.

== History ==
The Basuto was sold in 1919 to a coal merchant in Belfast by J. Kekky & Co. In the 1920s, she was acquired by Cooper & Sons of Widnes and was converted into a sailing barge to transport sand and gravel.

She was later bought by Manchester Dry Docks Ltd and was retrofitted with a steam engine. Her boiler dates from 1961 and was manufactured by the Cradley Boiler Company. In 1981, she was acquired by the National Waterways Museum in Ellesmere Port where she has been exhibited ever since.

This vessel has been listed on the National Historic Ships since 1993 and is also one of the many ships on the National Historic Fleet and is one of the oldest surviving and preserved ships in the world.
