= James Copeland (actor) =

Scottish actor (1918–2002)

- Born: 1 May 1918; Helensburgh, Dunbartonshire, Scotland
- Died: 17 April 2002 (aged 83); London, England
- Occupation: Actor
- Years active: 1953-1991
- Spouse: Helen Copeland (died 1997)
- Children: 2, including James Cosmo

James Copeland (1 May 1918 – 17 April 2002) was a Scottish actor.

His film work began in 1953, the year which saw him play the most prominent role of his movie career, that of Andy McGregor in the ensemble cast of Innocents in Paris. Other roles included Mackay in The Seekers (1954), the ship's mate in The Maggie (1954), Rockets Galore! (1958), a police constable (at a road block) in The 39 Steps (1959), Farewell Performance (1963), Torture Garden (1967), and the guide in The Private Life of Sherlock Holmes (1970).

He also appeared on TV as one of the first continuity announcers/newsreaders with Aberdeen-based station Grampian TV, from its inception in September 1961, he left the station after a few months and returned to acting where he also played the Gond leader Selris in the Doctor Who story The Krotons, Captain Ogilvie in Operation Kilt, an early episode of Dad's Army, and the Scottish customer in Camping In, an episode of Are You Being Served?. He later played Jamie Stewart in Take the High Road from 1982 to 1987. He produced a collection of poetry entitled Some Work (Bramma, 1972) which included the much anthologised poem 'Black Friday'.

He had a son, James Cosmo, who is also an actor, and a daughter named Laura.

== Filmography ==
Year	Title	Role	Notes
1953	Laxdale Hall	Fisherman	
1953	Sailor of the King	Cmdr. Laughton	Uncredited
1953	Innocents in Paris	Andy	
1954	The Maggie	The Mate	
1954	The Seekers	Mackay	
1954	Mask of Dust	Johnny Jackson - mechanic	
1955	You Lucky People!	Pvt. Jim Campbell	
1956	The Battle of the River Plate	Chief Yeoman, HMS Achilles	Uncredited
1958	Rockets Galore!	Kenny McLeod	
1959	The 39 Steps	Police Constable at Roadblock	Uncredited
1960	Tunes of Glory	One of the Other Officers #4	
1963	Farewell Performance	Andrews	
1967	Torture Garden	Fred	(segment 2 "Terror Over Hollywood")
1967	The Big Catch	Mr. Cameron	
1970	The Private Life of Sherlock Holmes	Guide	
1990	The Big Man	Sam	(final film role)
