= The Maggie =

1954 British film by Alexander Mackendrick

- Original British quad-sized poster
- Directed by: Alexander Mackendrick
- Screenplay by: William Rose
- Story by: Alexander Mackendrick
- Produced by: Michael Balcon; Michael Truman
- Starring: Paul Douglas; Alex Mackenzie; James Copeland
- Cinematography: Gordon Dines
- Music by: John Addison
- Production company: Ealing Studios
- Distributed by: General Film Distributors (UK); Universal-International (US)
- Release dates: 25 February 1954 (UK); 30 August 1954 (US)
- Running time: 92 minutes
- Country: United Kingdom
- Language: English

The 'Maggie' (U.S. title: High and Dry; also known as Highland Fling) is a 1954 British comedy film directed by Alexander Mackendrick and starring Paul Douglas, Alex Mackenzie and James Copeland. It was written by William Rose and produced by Ealing Studios. It is a story of a clash of cultures between a hard-driving American businessman and a wily Scottish Clyde puffer captain.

The story was inspired by Neil Munro's short stories of the Vital Spark and her captain, Para Handy.

== Plot ==
The Maggie is an aged Clyde puffer, a small, coal fired cargo boat. Peter MacTaggart, her rascal of a captain, is in dire need of £300 to repair the boat's plates and renew its loading licence. At the offices of a shipping company in Glasgow, he overhears Mr Pusey, an Englishman complete with bowler hat and umbrella, trying to arrange transportation of some personal items of furniture for his boss, American Calvin B. Marshall. The reputable shipping company has nothing immediately available, so MacTaggart gets the job when Pusey mistakenly believes that he works for the company and that the more modern vessel docked next to the Maggie is MacTaggart's.

Marshall is a wealthy industrialist, a stubborn and determined self-made man. When he eventually learns the truth, he sets out in pursuit by aeroplane and hired car. Catching up with the puffer, he puts Pusey on board to ensure the cargo is transferred to another boat. Pusey is no match for the captain and ends up in jail on a charge of poaching, after pushing the Laird in the canal. Marshall realizes that he will have to handle the matter personally. After another costly chase, he boards the boat himself to hasten the cargo transfer. The route and timing of the voyage however, are governed by MacTaggart, tidal variations, fog and local community priorities.

Marshall's hostile attitude gradually softens somewhat. He is particularly touched by the loyalty of the "wee boy", Dougie, to his captain. At one point, when Marshall threatens to buy the boat from the owner, MacTaggart's sister, and sell it for scrap, Dougie releases a folding table on him, knocking him unconscious. His mood changes again when the wily MacTaggart moors the puffer under a wooden jetty; as the tide rises, the jetty (due for dismantling anyway) is damaged, making it impossible to transfer the furniture to the deeper draught vessel when it arrives.

At one of the unscheduled stops, the crew attend the hundredth birthday party of an islander, and Marshall chats with a nineteen-year-old girl who is pondering her future. She has two suitors, an up-and-coming, ambitious store owner and a poor fisherman. The American advises her to choose the former, but she believes she will marry the latter, explaining that he will give her his time, rather than just things. This strikes a chord with Marshall. He is having marital difficulties, and the furniture is an attempt to patch things up with his wife.

As they finally near their destination, the engine fails. Marshall uses his engineering knowledge to repair the old, poorly maintained machinery. The engine fires up but only serves to drive the Maggie onto some rocks. Marshall asks MacTaggart if they can save her by jettisoning the cargo. MacTaggart then apologetically informs him that he neglected to insure the furniture, but Marshall orders it thrown overboard anyway. The Maggie is saved.

At journey's end, Marshall, with some prodding by Dougie, even allows MacTaggart to keep the money he so desperately needs. In appreciation of his magnanimity, MacTaggart renames the puffer the Calvin B. Marshall.

== Cast ==
- Paul Douglas as Calvin B. Marshall
- Alex Mackenzie as Captain MacTaggart
- Tommy Kearins as Dougie, the wee boy
- James Copeland as the mate
- Abe Barker as the engineer
- Hubert Gregg as Pusey
- Dorothy Alison as Miss Peters, Marshall's secretary
- Meg Buchanan as Sarah MacTaggart, the owner of the ship
- Geoffrey Keen as Campbell, the owner of the large shipping company
- Mark Dignam as the Laird who jails Pusey
- Roddy McMillan as the Inverkerran driver

== Production ==
The Maggie was played by two J.J. Hay boats in the film, the Boer and the Inca. Much of the film was shot on location at Crinan and Islay. The film uses real place names as far as the Crinan Canal, then switches to fictional placenames once they get through it (apart from Oban, Applecross and Portree). The film's working title was "Highland Fling" and The Puffers, during filming in the summer of 1953, but was changed to The Maggie before its release in early 1954.

== Reception ==
=== Box office ===
According to Kinematograph Weekly the film was a "money maker" at the British box office in 1954.

=== Critical ===
The Monthly Film Bulletin wrote: "The Maggie is a small, charming film which concentrates most of its attention on the character of its Scottish sailors. Here the director has been very successful in capturing the particular mixture of canniness and humour, petty deceitfulness and honesty. The performances of the Scottish players are wonderfully vivid: Alex Mackenzie plays MacTaggart with great assurance and quiet humour, and the boy actor Tommy Kearins gives a beautifully sincere performance, real and touching. William Rose's script provides some ingeniously contrived escapades, has, on the whole, excellent dialogue, but allows the pace to fall off a little in the final sequences. ... The Maggie, while retaining the verve and sympathies of Whisky Galore! (Mackendrick's first film, with a similar setting and theme), is more firmly directed, and marks a welcome return to form among Ealing comedies."

Variety wrote: "The yarn has been subtly written as a piece of gentle and casual humor. The pace is always leisurely, and the background of Scottish lakes and mountains provides an appropriate backcloth to the story. The picture has been directed without any attempt to force the pace. Fine camera work highlights the natural scenery.. ... General technical credits are up to standard although a little more scissoring in later stages would be an asset."

In British Sound Films: The Studio Years 1928–1959 David Quinlan rated the film as "average", writing: "Warm, whimsical comedy, occasionally very funny."

Leslie Halliwell said: "Mildly amusing comedy about the wily Scots; not the studio at its best, but pretty fair."

The Radio Times Guide to Films gave the film 4/5 stars, writing: "Ostensibly, this most underestimated of Ealing comedies is a whimsical story about a crew of canny Clydebankers giving a brash American a torrid time after being assigned to carry his property aboard their clapped-out steamer. Don't be fooled, however, by the leisurely pace, the gentle humour and the relatively good-natured conclusion. This is a wicked little satire on the mutual contempt that underlies Euro-American relations, and few could have handled it with such incisive insight as American-born Scot Alexander Mackendrick. Cruel rather than quaint."

In 1963 Colin McArthur criticised its representation of Scotland and its relationship with American capital, and of the failure of contemporary commentators to interrogate the narrative about the Scotland it constructed.

== Home video ==
Issued in the UK on VHS in 2002, a DVD followed in 2006 and was included alongside three other films in The Definitive Ealing Studios Collection: Volume Four. A digitally restored version was issued on Blu-ray and DVD in 2015, which contains subtitles and extra features. The Maggie was released in the US on 10 March 2020 as part of an Ealing Comedy double feature entitled Whisky Galore! & The Maggie: Two Films by Alexander Mackendrick.
