= The Vital Spark =

Scottish television series, 1965–1967, 1973–1974

The Vital Spark is a BBC Scotland television series set in the Firth of Clyde and Hebrides of Scotland in the 1930s, based on the Para Handy books by Neil Munro. It starred Roddy McMillan as Peter "Para Handy" MacFarlane, captain of the puffer Vital Spark.

The series followed the Vital Spark's adventures around the coastal waters of west Scotland and the various schemes that Para Handy would get himself and his crew involved in.

The comedy was first broadcast in August 1965 as an episode of the BBC’s Comedy Playhouse series. Following this two series, of six and seven episodes respectively, were commissioned by BBC Scotland and transmitted in early 1966, and autumn 1967. Both series were made in black-and-white. Of these only "A Drop O’ The Real Stuff" survives. In March 1973 an hour-long TV Special was made, in colour, featuring the same cast. After the success of this, a further six episodes (essentially remakes of previous scripts but in a more contemporary setting) were commissioned, broadcast in the autumn of 1974. Four of the seven colour episodes survive complete.

== Cast ==
- Roddy McMillan - Captain Peter "Para Handy" MacFarlane
- John Grieve - Dan Macphail, the engineer
- Walter Carr - Dougie Campbell, the mate
- Alex McAvoy - Davie "Sunny Jim" Green
- Robert Urquhart - Dougie (pilot only)

== Episodes ==
=== Series 1 ===
No.	Title	Original release date
1	"Pilot"	12 August 1965
2	"A Drop O’ The Real Stuff"	28 January 1966
3	"Salvage"	4 February 1966
4	"The Quarrel"	11 February 1966
5	"The Bad Luck Cargo"	18 February 1966
6	"The Acts"	25 February 1966
7	"A Good Man Gone"	4 March 1966

=== Series 2 ===
No.	Title	Original release date
8	"The Duel"	16 August 1967
9	"The Warning"	23 August 1967
10	"Macphail’s Week"	30 August 1967
11	"The Heroes"	6 September 1967
12	"The Answer’s A Lemon"	13 September 1967
13	"Say It With Flair"	20 September 1967
14	"The Big Bang"	27 September 1967

=== Series 3 ===
No.	Title	Original release date
15	"The Vital Spark: Special - The Marriage aka The Wedding"	5 March 1973
16	"The Duel"	19 September 1974
17	"The Quarrel"	26 September 1974
18	"A Drop O’ The Real Stuff"	3 October 1974
19	"Bad Luck Cargo"	10 October 1974
20	"Macphail's Week"	17 October 1974
21	"A Good Man Gone"	24 October 1974
