= Glasgow Evening News =

Newspaper

The Glasgow Evening News was a Scottish newspaper in the early 20th century. It was founded as the Glasgow Evening Post in 1866 and became the Evening News in 1915.

In 1922, Gomer Berry (later 1st Viscount Kemsley) bought the Glasgow Evening News and the sister papers the Daily Record and the Sunday Mail, for £1 million. He formed a controlling company known as Associated Scottish Newspapers Ltd. Kemsley sold all three papers to the London-based Mirror Group in 1955.

The journalist and author Neil Munro was editor for a time, and his Erchie MacPherson and Para Handy stories were first published in the newspaper.

The newspaper closed in January 1957.
