= Duncan Macrae (actor) =

Scottish actor (1905–1967)

- Macrae in Casino Royale (1967)
- Born: John Duncan Macrae; 20 August 1905; Maryhill, Glasgow, Lanarkshire, Scotland
- Died: 23 March 1967 (aged 61); Glasgow, Scotland
- Occupation: Actor

John Duncan Macrae (20 August 1905 – 23 March 1967) was a Scottish actor, working mainly in stage but also television and film.

== Life and career ==
Macrae was born at 118 Kirkland Street, Maryhill, Glasgow, the fourth of the six children of James Macrae, a sergeant in the Glasgow police force, and his wife, Catherine Graham. He attended Allan Glen's School and matriculated in the engineering faculty at Glasgow University in 1923–1924, but did not graduate. He trained as a schoolteacher at Jordanhill College, where he met Ann H Mcallister, the voice coach, who was a profound influence on his life. He taught in Glasgow until he became a professional actor in 1943, after a successful amateur drama career.

He first made his name as a comic actor of distinction with Curtain Theatre, an amateur group, in 1937, in the title role of Robert McLellan's Jamie the Saxt, a performance which became his "signature" role in the early years. In 1938, he directed Curtain's production of Henrik Ibsen's Hedda Gabler at the Lyric Theatre in Glasgow. He was then a member, along with Stanley Baxter, of the early Citizens' Theatre company in Glasgow, founded during the war in 1943. In 1948, he played Oliphant, the Laird of Stumpie, in the first performance of Robert Kemp's Let Wives Tak Tent, a translation into Scots of Molière's L'école des femmes, at the Gateway Theatre in Edinburgh.

He had a role in the 1949 Ealing comedy Whisky Galore!, based on the book by Sir Compton Mackenzie, and, in the first TV series adapted from stories about Para Handy – Master Mariner, Neil Munro's masterpiece of west coast "high jinks", Macrae played the eponymous Captain. He lived in Glasgow and also had a home in Millport on the island of Cumbrae. In 1953 he starred alongside Jean Anderson in the role of James MacKenzie, an embittered settler in the drama The Kidnappers for which he received a Scottish Arts Council award. One of the film's most memorable moments comes with the horror on Duncan Macrae's face at what his grandchild must have thought of him when the little boy implores "Don't eat the babbie".

Macrae played the Nabob in the Edinburgh Gateway Company's Edinburgh International Festival production of McLellan's historical comedy The Flouers o Edinburgh in August 1957. He then played the title role in James Bridie's Dr. Angelus at The Gateway before returning to the Citizens' to play Malvolio in Shakespeare's Twelfth Night. He also played the lead role in The Sow's Lug, a radio play written and produced by the Hawick poet and writer David Hill.

During the 1960s he appeared in episodes of the cult TV series The Avengers and The Prisoner, as well as Inspector Mathis in the James Bond spoof Casino Royale.

Macrae became a mainstay of television Hogmanay celebrations in the 1950s and 1960s with a rendition of his song (in Glaswegian Scots), "The Wee Cock Sparra".

Macrae died in March 1967, in Glasgow, before the release of several screen appearances: in the films Casino Royale, and 30 Is a Dangerous Age, Cynthia, and in the television series The Wednesday Play and The Prisoner.

== Theatre ==
Year	Title	Role	Company	Director	Notes
1943	Holy Isle	Friar Innocence	The Glasgow Citizens Theatre	Jennifer Sounes	play by James Bridie
1948	Ane Satyre of the Thrie Estaites	Flatterie	The Glasgow Citizens' Theatre	Tyrone Guthrie, Moultrie Kelsall	play by Sir David Lyndsay, adapted by Robert Kemp
1948	Let Wives Tak Tent	Oliphant	Gateway Theatre Company, Edinburgh		play by Molière, translated into Scots by Robert Kemp
1957	The Flouers o Edinburgh	The Nabob	Gateway Theatre Company, Edinburgh		play by Robert McLellan

== Selected filmography ==
- The Brothers (1947): John MacRae
- Whisky Galore! (1949): Angus MacCormac
- The Woman in Question (1950): Superintendent Lodge
- You're Only Young Twice (1952): Professor Hayman
- The Kidnappers (1953): Jim MacKenzie, Granddaddy
- Geordie (1955): Schoolmaster
- Rockets Galore! (1957): Duncan Ban
- The Bridal Path (1959): HQ Police Sgt
- Our Man in Havana (1959): MacDougal
- Kidnapped (1960): The Highlander
- Tunes of Glory (1960): Pipe Major Maclean
- Greyfriars Bobby (1961): Sgt Davie Maclean
- The Best of Enemies (1961): Sgt Trevethan
- Girl in the Headlines (1963): Barney
- A Jolly Bad Fellow (1964): Dr Brass
- Casino Royale (1967): Inspector Mathis (posthumous release)
- 30 Is a Dangerous Age, Cynthia (1968): Jock McCue (final film role, posthumous release)

== Television ==
- Para Handy - Master Mariner (1959): Para Handy
- Kidnapped (1963): Ebeneezer Balfour
- The Avengers (1964), episode "Esprit de Corps": Brigadier General Sir Ian Stuart-Bollinger
- Dr. Finlay's Casebook (1964): Cogger
- The Prisoner (1967), episode "Dance of the Dead": Doctor/Napoleon Bonaparte

== A Noble Clown ==
A Noble Clown, a solo play written and performed by Michael Daviot telling the story of the life of Duncan Macrae, was staged at the Scottish Storytelling Centre in Edinburgh on 30 November and 1 December 2024. and during the Edinburgh Fringe Festival in 2025.
