= Roddy McMillan =

Scottish actor and playwright (1923–1979)

- Born: 23 March 1923; Glasgow, Scotland
- Died: 9 July 1979 (aged 56); Glasgow, Scotland
- Occupations: Actor, Playwright

Roddy McMillan OBE (23 March 1923 – 9 July 1979) was a Scottish actor and playwright, possibly most famous for his comedy role as Para Handy for BBC Scotland's television series, The Vital Spark. He also played the lead role in Edward Boyd's private eye series, The View from Daniel Pike.

== Biography ==
The Glasgow-born McMillan worked for a time in a glassworks. His theatre work began in the mid-1940s with the Glasgow Unity Theatre. Later that decade, he began acting with the Glasgow Citizen's Company before moving on to Edinburgh's Gateway Theatre in the mid-1950s.

His first play, All in Good Faith, about a Glasgow family which unexpectedly comes into possession of £15,000, was first staged in 1954. He performed in his second play, The Bevellers, which premiered at the Lyceum Theatre in Edinburgh and achieved success at the Citizens Theatre in Glasgow during 1973 and then as a televised Play for Today for the BBC. McMillan also played Detective Inspector "Choc" Minty in the late 1970s private eye series, Hazell, starring Nicholas Ball.

McMillan was awarded the OBE in the 1978 Queen's Birthday honours.

== Death ==
Roddy McMillan died following a heart attack, aged 56, not long after completing filming on the second series of Hazell.

== Theatre ==
Year	Title	Role	Company	Director	Notes
1948	Ane Satyre of the Thrie Estate	Poor Man	The Glasgow Citizens Theatre	Tyrone Guthrie, Moultrie Kelsall	play by Sir David Lyndsay, adapted by Robert Kemp
1972	Willie Rough	Jake Adams	Lyceum Theatre, Edinburgh	Bill Bryden	play by Bill Bryden

== Filmography ==
Year	Title	Role	Notes
1950	The Gorbals Story	Hector	
1950	Morning Departure	Leading Seaman Andrews	
1952	You're Only Young Twice	Milligan	
1953	Laxdale Hall	Willie John Watt	
1954	The Maggie	Inverkerran Driver	
1958	Cat & Mouse	Mr. Pomeroy	
1959	The Bridal Path	Murdo	
1960	The Battle of the Sexes	Macleod	
1960	The Big Day	Bob	
1960	Snowball	Jack, 'bus conductor	
1962	A Prize of Arms	Sgt. McVie	
1962	The Amorous Prawn	Pvt. McTavish	
1963	The Mouse on the Moon	Benter	
1969	Ring of Bright Water	Busdriver	
1972	Chato's Land	Gavin Malechie	
1978	Sweeney 2	Collie	

== Reviews ==
- Findlay, Bill (1980), review of All in Good Faith in Bold, Christine (ed.), Cencrastus No. 3, Summer 1980, pp. 43 & 44, ISSN 0264-0856.
