= Gabbart =

A gabbart is a type of lighter or barge used from the 17th to the 19th century. Gabbarts were small, one-masted sailing or coasting vessels. They were used mostly for inland navigation—notably on the River Clyde in Scotland—and transported mainly coal and fish (mainly herring).

An 1877 source claims that "Gabbarts are boats of from 30 to 40 tons, which, before the railway was opened to Balloch, carried coals etc., from the Clyde, up the River Leven, to various places on the banks of the Loch, taking back cargoes of slates or timber."

A Gabbart can also refer to the typical Scottish sailing barge, from which most Scottish Canal craft were developed. These barges were long, narrow, and flat vessels or lighter with a hatchway extending almost the full length of the decks, which were sometimes fitted with masts that may be lowered to pass under bridges.

== See also ==
- Clyde puffer
