= Andrew Fairlie (actor) =

Scottish actor

- Born: Andrew Fairlie; 1963 (age 62–63); Broxburn, West Lothian, Scotland
- Years active: 1988–1999; 2008

Andrew Fairlie is a Scottish actor who is most famous for playing the role of Gash Nesbitt in the BBC sitcom Rab C. Nesbitt. He also starred as Sunny Jim in the 1994 BBC Scotland series The Tales of Para Handy.

Between the end of the regular series of Rab C. Nesbitt in 1999 and 2008, Fairlie did no acting, until reprising the role of Gash in the 2008 Christmas special. He did not return for the new series of Rab C Nesbitt and was replaced by Iain Robertson.

== Appearances ==
- Rab C. Nesbitt (1988–2008)...as Gash Nesbitt
- Taggart (1989–90)...as Barman
- The Tales of Para Handy (1994–95)...as Sunny Jim
- Pulp Video (1995–96)...as Various Characters
- Atletico Partick (1996)...Dezzy
