= Sean Scanlan =

Scottish actor

- Born: 18 August 1948; Glasgow, Scotland, UK
- Died: 17 April 2017 (aged 68)
- Occupation: Actor
- Known for: Rab C. Nesbitt, Two Thousand Acres of Sky, “Hamish Macbeth”, “The Tales Of Para Handy”

Sean Scanlan (18 August 1948 – 17 April 2017) was a Scottish actor. He is known primarily for his many television and stage roles.

== Career ==
Scanlan appeared in a large number of plays and television programmes, including as Dougie the ship's mate in The Tales of Para Handy and Shug in Rab C. Nesbitt.

He had a major role in Two Thousand Acres of Sky, playing Gordon Macphee, the ferryboat captain. Smaller parts include playing Kenneth McIver, the unlucky criminal brother of regular cast member TV John McIver in Hamish Macbeth. He also played the part of Duncan 'Jock' Mcevoy in Yorkshire TV's 1982 production of Airline alongside Roy Marsden and Richard Heffer.

In 2011, he performed in Sins of the Father while rehearsing Lark, Clark and the Puppet Handy.

== Personal life ==
Born in Glasgow, Scotland, attended St Aloysius' College, he was married to Barbara Rafferty, whom he met while performing Playing for Real.

Sean Scanlan died on 17 April 2017 of throat cancer, aged 68.
