= Walter Carr (actor) =

Scottish actor (1925–1998)

- Painting by June Crisfield Chapman c.1996
- Born: 26 December 1925; Larkhall, Lanarkshire, Scotland
- Died: 30 May 1998 (aged 72); Perth, Scotland
- Occupations: Actor & comedian
- Partner(s): Leon Sinden (1952–1998)

Walter Carr (né Walter Anderson) (26 December 1925 – 30 May 1998) was a Scottish actor and comedian.

== Career ==
He played the servant, Jock Carmichael, in the Edinburgh Gateway Company's Edinburgh International Festival production of Robert McLellan's historical comedy The Flouers o Edinburgh in August 1957, and was in the cast of its production of All for Mary by Kay Bannerman and Harold Brooke in February 1958. He played one of the Vices in Tyrone Guthrie's Edinburgh Festival production of Ane Satyre of the Thrie Estaites at the Church of Scotland's Assembly Hall in August 1959, and Sandy the scout in the 1960 Festival production of Sydney Goodsir Smith's The Wallace. In 1963, he gave a memorable comedy performance as the imagined invalid in the Gateway's production of The Hypochondriack, Victor Carin's translation into Scots of Molière's Le malade imaginaire.

Possibly his best known role was as the mate Dougie in the TV series The Vital Spark (1965–67).

He played Shooey in Lex MacLean's TV series. Other television roles included Davy McNeil in The Dark Island (1962), James Pigg in Mr. John Jorrocks (1966), and Advocate Fife in Weir of Hermiston (1973).

He had a minor part as the school teacher in the cult film The Wicker Man (1973), and played a jeweller in the comedy The Girl in the Picture (1985).

== Theatre ==
Year	Title	Role	Company	Director	Notes
1957	The Flouers o Edinburgh	Jock Carmichael	Gateway Theatre Company, Edinburgh	Lennox Milne	play by Robert McLellan
1960	The Wallace	Sandy	Edinburgh International Festival		play by Sydney Goodsir Smith
1990	Treasure Island	Ben Gunn	Edinburgh International Festival	Frank Dunlop	

== Filmography ==
=== Film and television ===
Year	Title	Role	Director	Notes
1973	The Wicker Man	schoolmaster	Robin Hardy	
1980	Lady Killers	James Moncreiff	Joan Kemp-Welch	Episode: Miss Madeleine Smith
1982	Scotch Myths	Sir Johnny Stalker	Murray Grigor	funded by Channel 4
1985	The Girl in the Picture	jeweller	Cary Parker	final role

== Personal life ==
He had a long-term relationship with fellow actor, Leon Sinden (1927–2015) for 46 years, from 1952 until Carr's death in 1998. They shared an elegant home in Perth.
