= Finlay J. MacDonald =

Finlay John Macdonald (Scottish Gaelic: Fionnlagh Iain MacDhòmhnaill; 4 July 1925 – 14 October 1987) was a Scottish journalist and radio and television producer and writer.

== Career ==
Born and raised on Harris in the Outer Hebrides, MacDonald was a native Gaelic language speaker and an important figure in Gaelic broadcasting in Scotland. He founded the Gaelic Drama Association and co-founded the quarterly Gaelic language magazine Gairm in 1951 with Derick Thomson. MacDonald served as Gairm's chief editor until 1964.

MacDonald was a BBC radio and television producer. His production for radio of Sydney Goodsir Smith's play, The Wallace, was broadcast by on 30 November 1959.

MacDonald edited A Journey to the Western Isles (1983), in which he retraced the 1773 tour of Scotland by Samuel Johnson and James Boswell. The book provided the text of Johnson's A Journey to the Western Islands of Scotland along with MacDonald's commentary and photographs.

== Memoirs ==
He wrote three books of memoirs that recall his childhood on Harris:

- Crowdie and Cream (1982)
- Crotal and White (1983)
- The Corncrake and the Lysander (1985).

These have been cited as providing valuable insights into life in the Outer Hebrides in the interwar period.
