= Bill Bryden =

Scottish stage and film director and screenwriter (1942–2022)

Bill Bryden CBE
- Born: William Campbell Rough Bryden; 12 April 1942; Greenock, Renfrewshire, Scotland
- Died: 5 January 2022 (aged 79); London, England
- Occupations: Theatre Director, Screenwriter
- Spouses: Deborah Morris (m. 1970; div. 1988) Angela Douglas (m. 2009)
- Children: 2
- Awards: Laurence Olivier Award for Best Director (1985)

William Campbell Rough Bryden CBE (12 April 1942 – 5 January 2022) was a Scottish stage and film director and screenwriter.

== Early life and career ==
Bryden worked as a trainee with Scottish Television before becoming assistant director at the Belgrade Theatre, Coventry, in 1965. He then worked as a director at the Royal Court Theatre (1967–1971), the Royal Lyceum Theatre, Edinburgh (1972–1975), Associate Director at the National Theatre (1975–1985); and as a visiting director in Glasgow and New York. In 1990, he directed Leoš Janáček's The Cunning Little Vixen, at the Royal Opera House. He was Head of Television Drama at BBC Scotland (1984-1993) and also did other work for film and television, as screenwriter, director and executive producer.

Bryden's play Willie Rough, set in Greenock between February 1914 and June 1916, was staged by the Royal Lyceum Theatre Company in February 1972. His play The Ship, dramatising the story of shipbuilding on the Clyde, was produced at the former Harland and Wolff shipyard in Govan, Glasgow, in the autumn of 1990.

== Personal life and death ==
In 1970 he married the Hon. Deborah Morris, a potter, who was a daughter of IOC President Michael Morris, 3rd Baron Killanin. They had two children, Dillon and Mary Kate. The couple divorced in 1988.

In the same year, he met actress Angela Douglas at a dinner party arranged by mutual friend Marsha Hunt. They lived together in west London and were married at City Hall, New York City, in February 2009.

National Life Stories conducted an oral history interview (C1316/11) with Bill Bryden in 2009 for its Legacy of the English Stage Company collection held by the British Library.

Bryden died from heart disease at Denville Hall, a retirement home for entertainers in Northwood, London, on 5 January 2022, aged 79.

== Honours ==
Bryden was appointed a Commander of the Order of the British Empire (CBE) in 1993.

== Work ==
Theatre programme for the 1990 production of The Ship

=== Film director ===
- 1983: Ill Fares the Land
- 1986: The Holy City
- 1987: Aria (segment)
- 1992: Six Characters in Search of an Author

=== Writer ===
- 1975: Benny Lynch, Scenes from a Short Life : a Play Benny Lynch: Scenes from a Short Life : a Play
- 1976: Willie Rough, a BBC Play for Today
- 1977: Old Movies
- 1980: The Long Riders (film)
- 1981: Civilians, a play
- 1990: The Ship (writer & director) Harland & Wolff Shed, Govan, Glasgow

=== Theatre director ===
- 1972: Kidnapped – Royal Lyceum
- 1974: Romeo and Juliet - Old Vic
- 1974: Spring Awakening – Old Vic
- 1974: Romeo and Juliet – Old Vic
- 1975: The Playboy of the Western World – Old Vic
- 1976: Watch It Come Down – Old Vic then National Theatre
- 1976: Il Campiello – National Theatre
- 1976: Counting the Ways – National Theatre
- 1977 (with Sebastian Graham Jones): The Passion – National Theatre
- 1977: Old Movies – National Theatre
- 1977: The Plough and the Stars – National Theatre
- 1978 (with Sebastian Graham Jones): Lark Rise – National Theatre
- 1978: American Buffalo – National Theatre
- 1978 (with Sebastian Graham Jones): The World Turned Upside Down – National Theatre
- 1978: The Long Voyage Home – National Theatre
- 1978: Dispatches – National Theatre
- 1979 (with Sebastian Graham Jones): Candleford – National Theatre
- 1980: Hughie – National Theatre
- 1980: The Iceman Cometh – National Theatre
- 1980: The Nativity – National Theatre
- 1980: The Crucible – National Theatre
- 1981: Civilians (writer & director) - Scottish Theatre Company
- 1982: Don Quixote - National Theatre
- 1982: A Midsummer Night's Dream – National Theatre
- 1983: Glengarry Glen Ross – National Theatre (World Premiere) then Mermaid Theatre, London
- 1983: Cinderella - National Theatre
- 1984: Golden Boy - National Theatre
- 1985: Doomsday, presented with The Nativity and The Passion, as the Mysteries from medieval Mystery plays in a version by Tony Harrison – National Theatre
- 1989: A Life in the Theatre - Theatre Royal then Strand Theatre, London
- 1989: Op Hoop Van Zegen - Ro Theatre Rotterdam, The Netherlands
- 1994: A Month in the Country by Ivan Turgenev, starring Helen Mirren and John Hurt. Yvonne Arnaud Theatre and West End
- 1994: The Big Picnic (writer & director) - Harland & Wolff, Govan, Glasgow
- 1995: Son of Man - The Pit, RSC, London
- 1996: Uncle Vanya - Minerva Theatre, Chichester then Albery Theare, London
- 1999: The Mysteries - The Nativity - National Theatre
- 1999: The Mysteries - The Passion - National Theatre
- 1999: The Mysteries - Doomsday - National Theatre
- 2001: The Good Hope – National Theatre
- 2005: Romeo and Juliet – Birmingham Repertory Theatre
- 2005: The Creeper – Theatre Royal Windsor

=== Opera director ===
- 1988: Parsifal by Richard Wagner - Royal Opera House, London
- 1990: The Cunning Little Vixen by Leoš Janáček - Royal Opera House, London
- 2000: The Silver Tassie - English National Opera, London

== Awards and nominations ==
- 1985: Olivier Award for Best Director, The Mysteries.
- 1985: Critics' Circle Theatre Award for Best Director for The Mysteries
- 1985: London Evening Standard Theatre Award for Best Director for The Mysteries
