= Clyde puffer =

Type of cargo ship

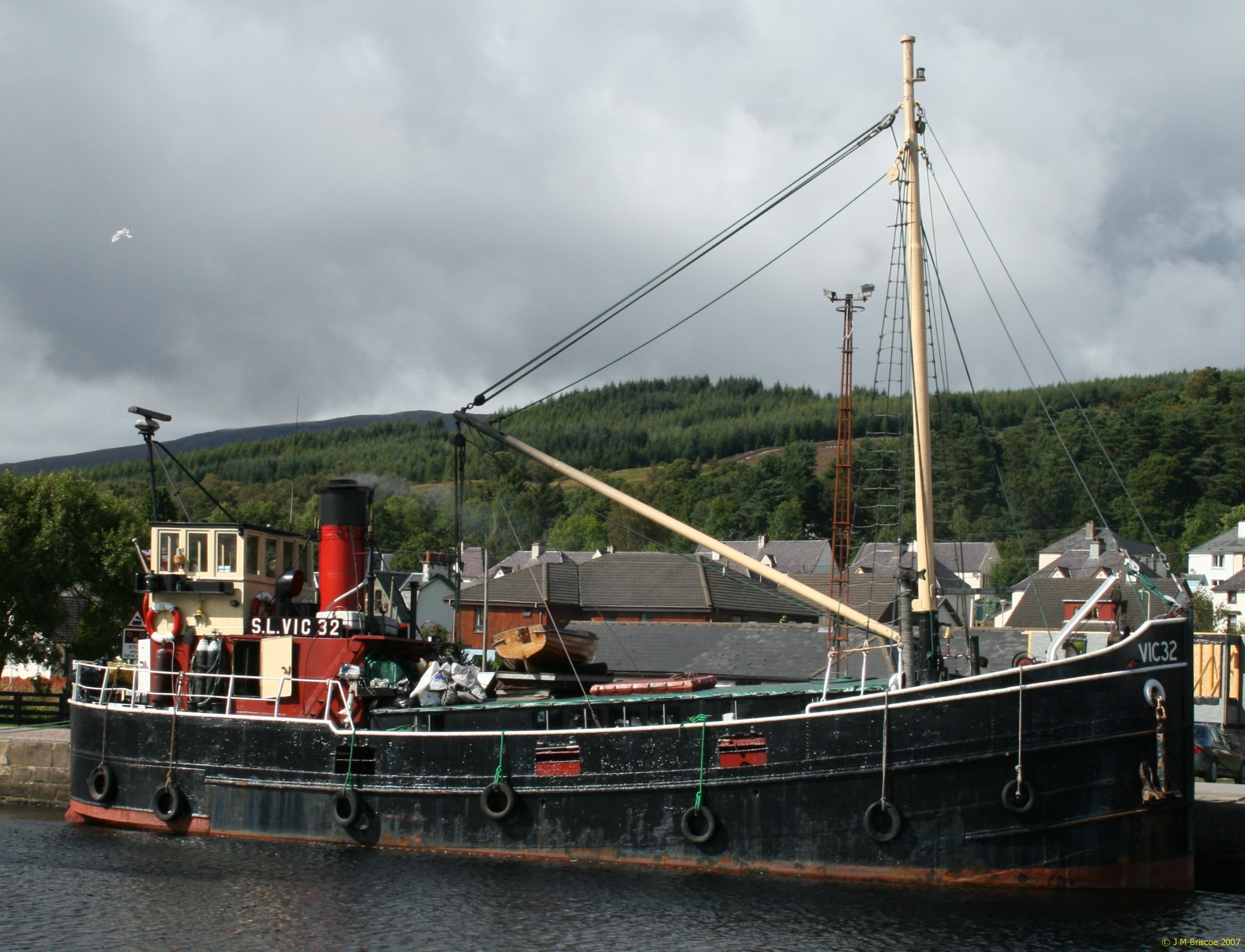
Steam Lighter VIC32, one of the last two seagoing coal-fired steam Clyde puffers

The Clyde puffer is a type of small coal-fired and single-masted cargo ship, built mainly on the Forth and Clyde Canal, which provided a vital supply link around the west coast and Hebrides of Scotland.

Built between 1856 and 1939, these stumpy little steamboats achieved an almost mythical status thanks largely to the short stories Neil Munro wrote about the Vital Spark and her captain Para Handy, which produced three television series.

== Characteristics ==
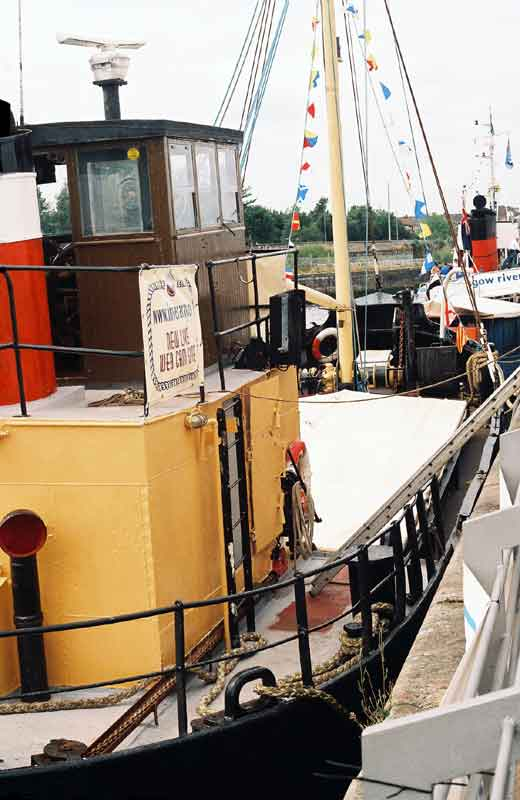
Eilean Eisdeal visiting Glasgow

Clyde puffers characteristically had bluff bows, crew's quarters with table and cooking stove in the focsle, and a single mast with derrick in front of the large hold. The funnel and ship's wheel stood aft above the engine room, followed by a small captain's cabin in the stern. When publication of the Vital Spark stories began in 1905 the ship's wheel was still in the open, but later a wheelhouse was added aft of the funnel giving the puffers their distinctive image. Their flat bottom allowed them to beach and unload at low tide, essential to supply remote settlements without suitable piers. Typical cargoes could include coal and furniture, with farm produce and gravel sometimes being brought back.

== History ==
The puffers developed from the gabbart, small single masted sailing barges, which took most of the coasting trade. The original puffer was the Thomas, an iron canal boat of 1856, less than 66 ft (20 m) long to fit in the Forth and Clyde Canal locks, powered by a simple steam engine without a condenser, since as it drew fresh water from the canal there was no need to economise on water use. Once steam had been used by the engine, it was simply exhausted up the funnel in a series of puffs as the piston stroked. As well as the visual sight of a series of steam puffs following the boat, the simple engines made a characteristic puffing sound. By the 1870s similar boats were being adapted for use beyond the canal and fitted with condensers so that they no longer puffed, but the name stuck. Some non-condensing puffers (included those with compound engines) were built until the 1920s when purely canal traffic decreased and the vast majority of coasters had to operate in sea water. A derrick was added to the single mast to lift cargo.

From this basic type of puffer three varieties developed: inside boats continued in use on the Forth and Clyde canal, while shorehead boats extended their range eastwards into the Firth of Forth and westwards as far as the Isle of Bute and from there up the length of Loch Fyne, their length kept at 66 ft (20 m) to use the canal locks. Both these types had a crew of three. Puffers of a third type, the outside boats, were built for the rougher sea routes to the Hebrides islands with a crew of four and the length increased to 88 ft (27 m) still allowing use of the larger locks on the Crinan Canal, which cuts across the Kintyre peninsula. There were more than 20 builders in Scotland, mainly on the Forth and Clyde canal at Kirkintilloch and Maryhill, Glasgow.

During World War I these handy little ships showed their worth in servicing warships, and were used at Scapa Flow, and for World War II the Admiralty placed an order in 1939 for steamships on the same design, mostly built in England, with the class name of VIC, standing for "Victualling Inshore Craft". After the war a number of VICs came into the coasting trade.

The Innisgara was fitted with an internal combustion engine in 1912, and while puffers generally were steam-powered, after World War II new ships began to be diesel engined, and a number of VICs were converted to diesel. The coasting trade serving the islands was kept up by the Glenlight Shipping Company of Greenock until in 1993 the government withdrew subsidies and, unable to compete with road transport using subsidised ferries, the service ended.

== In fiction ==
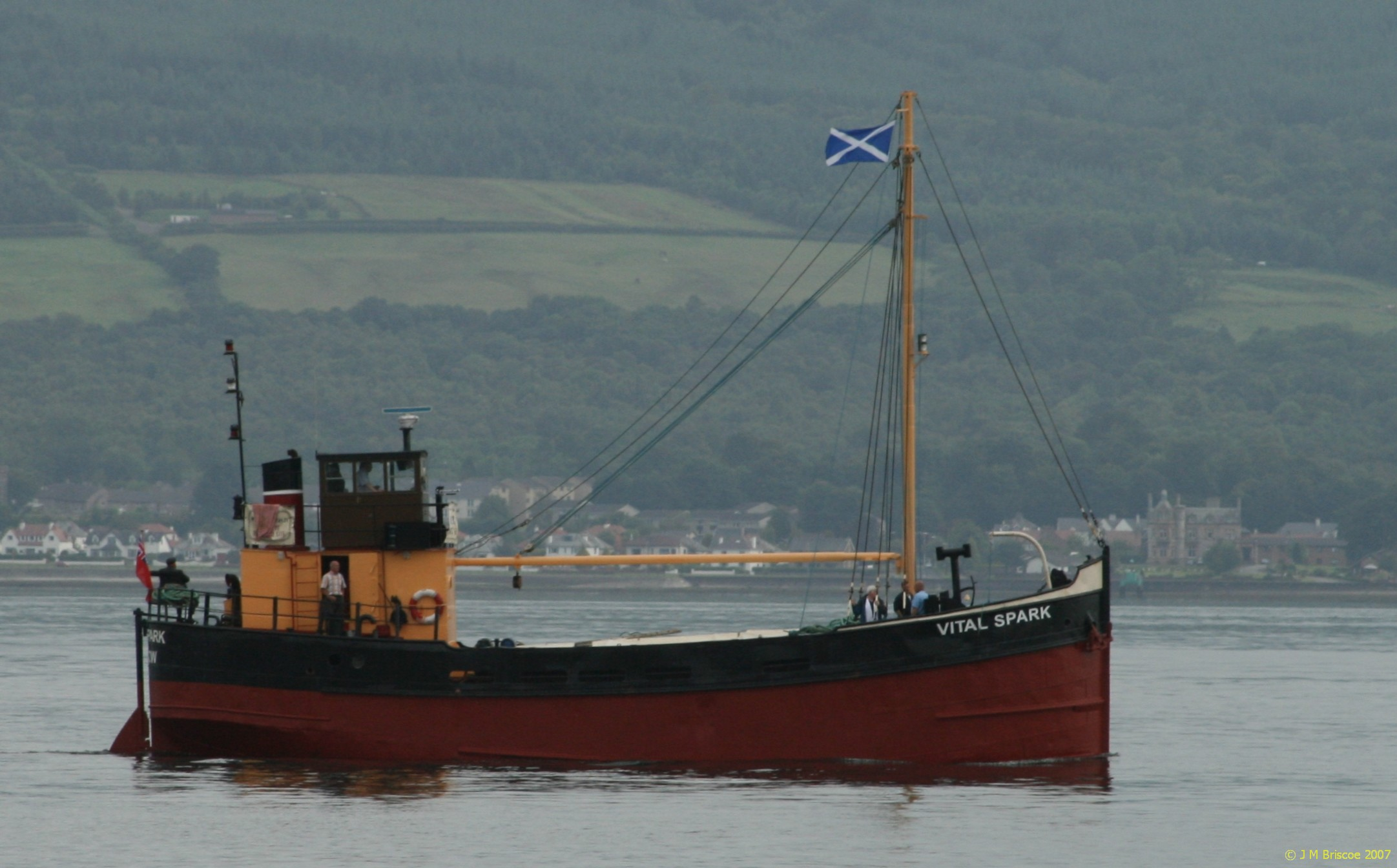
Eilean Eisdeal named as the fictional Vital Spark

The short stories that Neil Munro first published in the Glasgow Evening News in 1905 appeared in the newspaper for over twenty years and achieved widespread fame, with collections issued in book form since 1931 still in print today. With the continuing popularity of these tales, the puffers became film stars in The Maggie, and Para Handy with his Vital Spark was the subject of three popular BBC television series dating from 1959 to 1995.

== Surviving craft ==
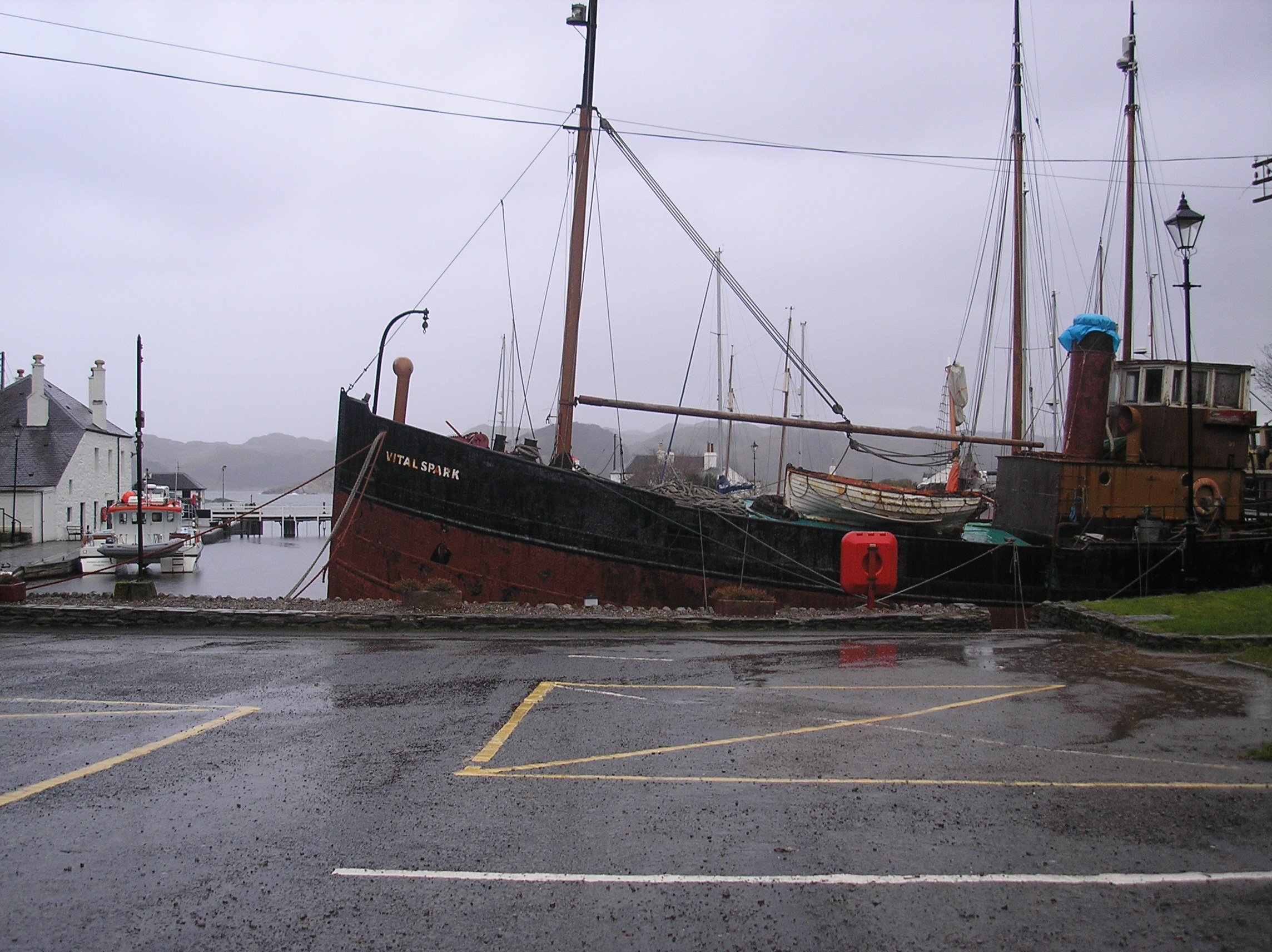
Auld Reekie at Crinan

A small number of puffers survive as conservation projects, though most have diesel engines.

VIC 32 is one of the last few surviving coal-fired steam-powered puffers and is based at The Change House, Crinan. She was built by Dunston's of Thorne, Yorkshire in November 1943 – a busy time for the Clyde Ship building yards. As the wartime Admiralty needed 50, (later 100) victualling boats in a hurry, they were built in groups of three by various yards in England. No new designs were needed as the perfect boat existed in a Clyde Puffer.

Steam sailings on VIC 32 have been available to the public from 1979, latterly as cruises on the Clyde, West Coast and Caledonian Canal. From 2004 she underwent extensive refitting at Corpach Boatyard at the west end of the canal near Fort William, funded by donations and lottery funds. After fitting of a new boiler by Pridham's Engineering and Corpach Boatbuilders, she steamed down from Fort William to Crinan, from where cruises have now re-commenced.

VIC 56 was built by Pollock, of Faversham in 1945. She is preserved in working order at Chatham Historic Dockyard, regularly steaming in the Thames and Medway estuaries.

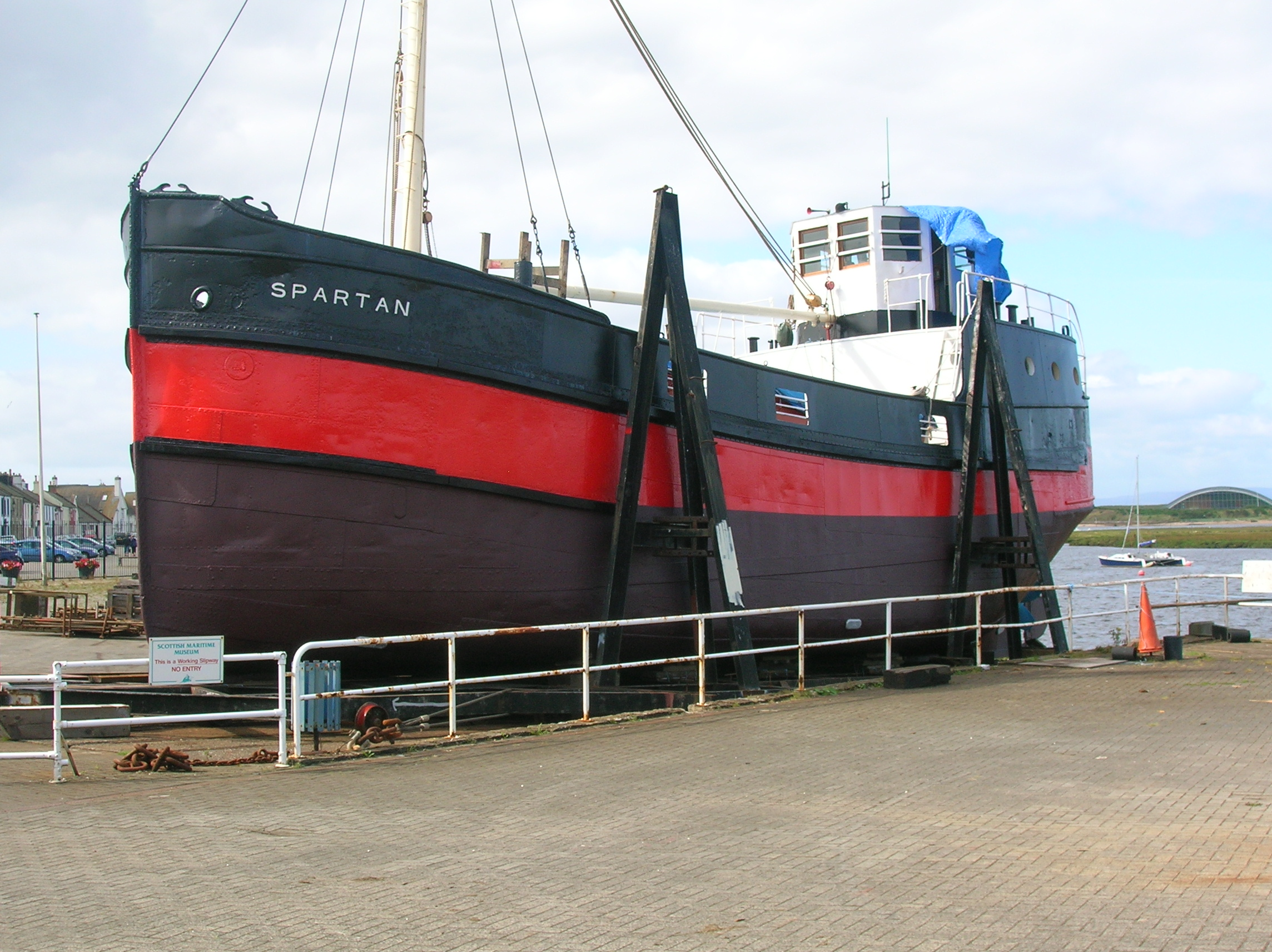
MV Spartan at Irvine

VIC 96 was built by Dunstons of Thorne, South Yorkshire in 1945, and after disposal, was restored at Maryport. The restoration was completed in 2009, retaining its steam engine, boiler and winch. On 8 August 2009, VIC 96 arrived at her new home, Chatham No. 1 Basin, after an epic 1,000 miles voyage from Elizabeth Dock, Maryport, which took five weeks.

VIC 27 was built at Rowhedge Ironworks. She was renamed Auld Reekie, and starred as the Vital Spark in the third BBC TV Para Handy series where she was berthed at Crinan Basin for 14 years, deteriorating. She was purchased (Oct 2006) by the owner of the Inveraray Maritime Museum who carried out some work on her. She has since been resold to a new owner who has already started on her major restoration work. As she is the oldest surviving steam-powered puffer in existence she must be restored and preserved as part of Scotland's heritage afloat.

VIC 72, renamed Eilean Eisdeal, continued in operation as the last of the true working "puffers" into the mid 1990s. In 2006 she was again renamed as Vital Spark of Glasgow after the Inveraray writer Neil Munro's Para Handy stories. She is now accessible to the public, alongside the Arctic Penguin at the Inveraray Maritime Museum, and continues to make sailings.

The Spartan, another diesel-engined "puffer", is on display at the Scottish Maritime Museum at Irvine. Spartan has recently undergone restoration work on her hull, and is still being refitted. The museum also features the diesel-powered motor coaster MV Kyles at Irvine (an early Clyde built coaster, not a puffer).

The Basuto is the oldest remaining Clyde puffer. Built at Port Dundas by William Jacks & Co in 1902, she is currently (2025) awaiting restoration following awarding of a £234k grant from the National Heritage Memorial Fund. She was built for William Jacks' own use on the Forth & Clyde Canal. Sold in 1919 to a Belfast coal-merchant, J. Kelly & Co, then in the 1920s sold again to Cooper & Sons of Widnes and converted to a dumb barge to carry gravel and sand. Later returned to steam with a new engine by Manchester Dry Docks Ltd, in 1981 she was acquired by the National Waterways Museum at Ellesmere Port.

There have also been reproduction puffers built to a smaller size, most recently the MV Mary Hill for tourist traffic on the Forth and Clyde canal.

== Scrapped craft ==
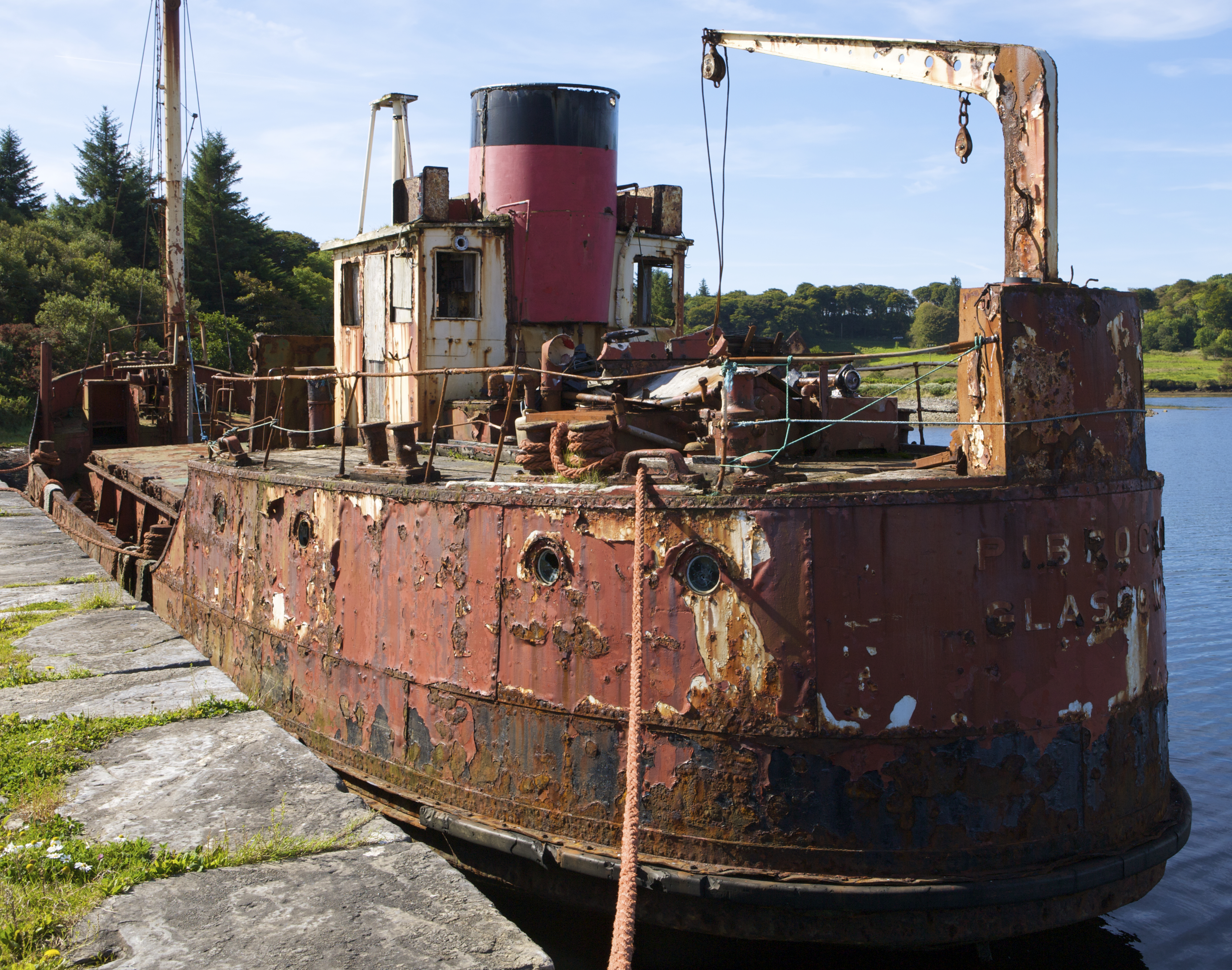
"Pibroch" at Letterfrack, now scrapped

The Pibroch, built at Bowling, West Dunbartonshire in 1957 as a diesel-engined boat for the Scottish Malt Distillers Ltd, had been lying at Letterfrack, County Galway, Ireland, in desperate need of restoration, since 2002. The Pibroch deteriorated further as time passed, and her bulkheads began to give way. In 2010 she was sold and was subsequently scrapped. A sister-ship, the Julia T., lies in 30m of water in Killary Bay some 300 yards off Lettergesh.
