= Neil Munro (writer) =

Scottish journalist and author (1863–1930)

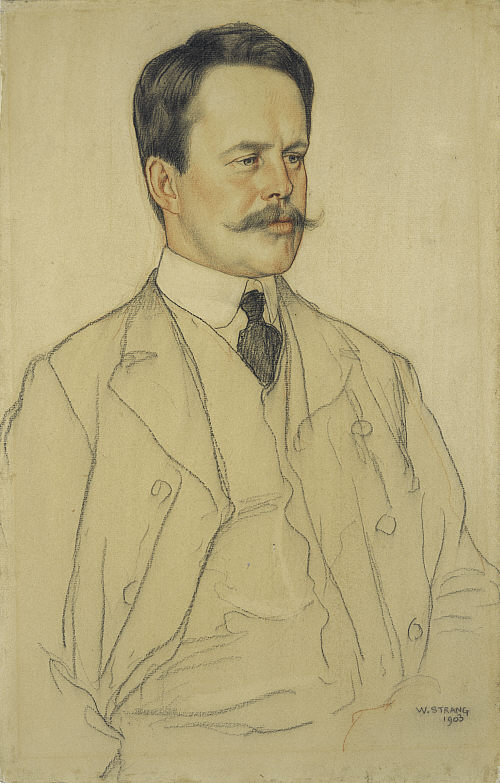
Pastel sketch of Munro by William Strang in 1903.

Neil Munro (3 June 1863 – 22 December 1930) was a Scottish journalist, newspaper editor, author and literary critic. He was basically a serious writer, but is now mainly known for his humorous short stories, originally written under the pen name Hugh Foulis. The best known of these stories are about the fictional Clyde puffer the Vital Spark and her captain Para Handy, but they also include stories about the waiter and kirk beadle Erchie MacPherson and the travelling drapery salesman Jimmy Swan. They were originally published in the Glasgow Evening News, but collections were published as books. A key figure in Scottish literary circles, Munro was a friend of the writers J. M. Barrie, John Buchan, Robert Bontine Cunninghame Graham and Joseph Conrad, and the artists Edward A. Hornel, George Houston, Pittendrigh MacGillivray and Robert Macaulay Stevenson. He was an early promoter of the works of both Conrad and Rudyard Kipling.

== Life ==
Munro was born in Inveraray, the illegitimate son of Ann Munro, a kitchen maid. His death certificate gives his father's name as James Thompson Munro. He was brought up by his maternal grandparents and an aunt. He attended Glencaddie Primary School and Church Square Public School, leaving at 14. For five years he worked in the office of the Sheriff Clerk of Argyll, a fairly prestigious post that has led to speculation that he may have had undisclosed family connections.

He then moved to Glasgow and worked briefly in the cashier's office in an ironmonger's shop in the Trongate before working as a journalist on the Greenock Advertiser, the Glasgow News, the Falkirk Herald and the Glasgow Evening News. He semi-retired from journalism in 1902 to concentrate on other writing. His play Macpherson, deploying his popular comic character, Erchie MacPherson, was staged by the Glasgow Repertory Theatre in 1909, and was well received. In 1914 he returned to journalism, becoming editor of the Glasgow Evening News in 1918.

Munro published several novels under his own name. Initially he had some success writing historical novels, most of them set in the Highlands and exploring the coming of change in the comparatively recent past. His best-known novels from this phase of his writing career are John Splendid, set around Montrose's campaign in the First Civil War and his attack on Inveraray, and Doom Castle, set around the Jacobite rising of 1745, which was dramatised by the BBC in 1980. Later he attempted to expand his range, with more mixed success, writing novels with contemporary settings, including The Daft Days. In 1914 he returned to a Highland historical setting with the last and best-known of his novels, The New Road, dramatised by the BBC in 1973.

He then concentrated on journalism again, but his work was affected by his poor health and the death of his son Hugh in the First World War. In October 1930 he received an honorary degree from the University of Edinburgh. He died in Craigendoran, Helensburgh, on 22 December 1930 aged 67. A private funeral was held in Inveraray and a memorial service held at Glasgow Cathedral.

John Buchan subsequently edited The Poetry of Neil Munro, published in 1931.

Obituaries for Munro commonly described him as the successor of Robert Louis Stevenson, and at his memorial service in Glasgow Cathedral the critic Lauchlan MacLean Watt described Munro as "the greatest Scottish novelist since Sir Walter Scott". After his death his serious novels faded from view, with the partial exception of The New Road, and he came to be remembered primarily as the creator of Para Handy. This change in Munro's reputation was accelerated by Hugh MacDiarmid, who became a detractor of Munro's style. There was a minor revival of interest in him around the turn of the 21st century, including the publication of annotated versions of the Para Handy stories with some stories not previously published in book form.

== Other pseudonyms ==
Many of Munro's journalistic works were written as ‘The Looker-On’ or ‘Mr Incognito’

== List of Works ==
Novels

- John Splendid (1898)
- Gilian the Dreamer (1899)
- Doom Castle (1901)
- The Shoes of Fortune (1901)
- Children of Tempest (1903)
- The Daft Days (1907)
- Fancy Farm (1910)
- The New Road (1914)

Short story collections

- The Lost Pibroch and other Sheiling Stories (1896)
- Jaunty Jock and Other Stories (1918)
- Ayrshire Idylls (1912)
- Para Handy Tales (1931) (Collected edition published after Munro's death)
- Para Handy, First complete edition (1991)
- Erchie and Jimmy Swan, First complete edition (1993)

Short story collections, written as Hugh Foulis

- Erchie, My Droll Friend (1904)
- The Vital Spark and her Queer Crew (1906)
- In Highland Harbours with Para Handy, s.s., Vital Spark (1911)
- Jimmy Swan, the Joy Traveller (1923)
- Hurricane Jack of the Vital Spark (1923)

Poetry

- The Poetry of Neil Munro, introduced by John Buchan (1931)

Non Fiction

- The Clyde, River and Firth (guidebook) (1907)
- The Brave Days (posthumous essay collection) (1931)

== Adaptations for Film and Television ==
- 1954 The Maggie (Film, directed by Alexander Mackendrick, inspired by the Para Handy stories)
- 1959 Para Handy - Master Mariner (6 part series. With Duncan Macrae as Para Handy. Lost)
- 1965 The Vital Spark (Comedy Playhouse. With Roddy MacMillan as Para Handy. Pilot for subsequent series. Lost)
- 1966 The Vital Spark (20 episodes over 3 series, 1966, 1967 and 1974. With Roddy MacMillan as Para Handy. 5 episodes survive)
- 1973 The New Road (5 part series. Lost)
- 1980 Doom Castle (6 part series)
- 1994 The Tales of Para Handy (With Gregor Fisher as Para Handy)
