= Jameson Clark =

British actor (1907–1984)

- Born: 8 July 1907; Kilbirnie, North Ayrshire, Scotland
- Died: 4 January 1984 (aged 76); Kilbirnie, Ayrshire, Scotland
- Occupation: Actor
- Years active: 1949–1980

Jameson Clark (8 July 1907, in Kilbirnie, North Ayrshire, Scotland – 4 January 1984, in Kilbirnie, Ayrshire, Scotland) was a Scottish character actor who appeared in 22 films and made many appearances on television.

== Career ==
His first appearance in a major film was the British production Whisky Galore! (1949), playing Constable Macrae, a role he would reprise in the sequel, Rockets Galore! (1957). His early roles were all to a Scottish typecast, and he made 13 films, including The Maggie (1954) and X the Unknown (1956) in which he portrayed Scottish characters, before he was given the part of an English tugboat captain in The Key (1958).

He appeared as McDougal in Ralph Thomas's re-make of John Buchan's The 39 Steps (1959), which also starred Kenneth More as Richard Hannay. The last of his four films released in 1959 was Charles Crichton's The Battle of the Sexes, playing Andrew Darling, with Peter Sellers and Robert Morley heading the cast.

After playing Sir Alan in the film Tunes of Glory (1960), he portrayed the Constable in Greyfriars Bobby: The True Story of a Dog (1961), a film based on the novel by Eleanor Atkinson, which recounts the tale of the Skye Terrier who would not leave his master's grave.

Clark briefly appeared on television, playing Jamie Lang in an episode of the British police series No Hiding Place ("Whistle and I'll Come", 1961). After playing George Lockwood in the film A Pair of Briefs (1962), Clark returned to TV as a Foreman in an episode of the Suspense anthology series ("Diversion to Danger", 1963). He would remain on the small screen for the next six years, in such series as The Troubleshooters and Dr. Finlay's Casebook, also re-surfacing in No Hiding Place, this time as Harry Armstrong in the episode "All Dead and Buried" (1963).

Clark's final film was Ring of Bright Water (1969), playing the Storekeeper in the film about otters based on the book by the naturalist Gavin Maxwell. From then until his retirement in 1980, he concentrated once more on contributions to television projects, amongst which were Sutherland's Law, The Prime of Miss Jean Brodie, Play for Today and Enemy of the People.

Clark also appeared as Campbell McNair, an important Member of the Community, in an Episode of Dr Finlay's Casebook Episode 3 Season 2 broadcast 19 September 1963.

Clark died on 4 January 1984 aged 76.

== Filmography ==
Year	Title	Role	Notes
1949	Whisky Galore!	Constable Macrae	
1952	The Brave Don't Cry	Dr. Andrew Kerr	
1953	Laxdale Hall	Roderick McLeod	
1953	The Kidnappers	Tom Cameron	(US: The Little Kidnappers)
1954	The Maggie	Dirty Dan	
1955	Geordie	Geordie's Father	
1956	Bond of Fear	Scotty	
1956	The Long Arm	Detective-Superintendent Ogilvie	
1956	High Terrace	Detective Inspector Mackay	
1956	X the Unknown	Jack Harding	
1957	Let's Be Happy	Bit Part	Uncredited
1957	The Long Haul	Sam MacNaughton	
1958	The Key	English Captain	
1958	Rockets Galore!	Constable Macrae	
1959	The 39 Steps	McDougal	
1959	Beyond This Place	Swann	(US: Web of Evidence)
1959	The Bridal Path	PC at Crossroads	
1960	The Battle of the Sexes	Andrew Darling	
1960	Tunes of Glory	Sir Alan	
1961	Greyfriars Bobby: The True Story of a Dog	Constable	
1962	A Pair of Briefs	George Lockwood	
1969	Ring of Bright Water	Storekeeper	
