= Challenge to Lassie =

1950 film by Richard Thorpe

- 1949 film poster
- Directed by: Richard Thorpe
- Screenplay by: William Ludwig
- Based on: Greyfriars Bobby; 1912 novel by Eleanor Atkinson
- Produced by: Robert Sisk
- Starring: Donald Crisp; Edmund Gwenn; Geraldine Brooks; Pal (credited as "Lassie")
- Cinematography: Charles Edgar Schoenbaum
- Edited by: George White
- Music by: André Previn
- Production company: Metro-Goldwyn-Mayer
- Distributed by: Loew's Inc.
- Release date: October 31, 1949
- Running time: 76 minutes
- Country: United States
- Language: English
- Budget: $775,000
- Box office: $1,155,000

Challenge to Lassie is an American drama directed by Richard Thorpe in Technicolor and released October 31, 1949, by MGM Studios. It was the fifth feature film starring the original Lassie, a collie named Pal, and the fourth and final Lassie film starring Donald Crisp.

The movie is based on Eleanor Stackhouse Atkinson's 1912 novel Greyfriars Bobby which in turn is based on the supposedly true story of Greyfriars Bobby. Twelve years after starring in Challenge to Lassie, Crisp would star in another movie based on the novel and produced by Walt Disney titled, Greyfriars Bobby.

Set in Scotland in 1860, the film tells the story of a rough collie named Lassie whose master, Jock Gray, is killed by robbers in Edinburgh. After his death, the dog keeps a constant vigil beside her master's grave in Greyfriars Kirkyard, which is in violation of the local dog laws. In the original novel, the title dog was a Skye Terrier named Bobby, and his owner dies from pneumonia.

== Plot ==
Jock Gray (Donald Crisp) raises his collie Lassie to be an extraordinary sheepdog and companion. When he is beaten to death by robbers after he retires, Lassie keeps vigil over his grave and refuses to let anyone else take ownership of her. However, the law requires that all dogs be leashed and licensed by a legal owner. With no owner to pay her license and her only "home" being the church graveyard, Lassie faces an uncertain future.

Her late owner's friend John Traill (Edmund Gwenn), his law student son William (Ross Ford), and the keepers of the graveyard struggle to keep Lassie hidden from the zealous police Sergeant Davie (Reginald Owen) and the town magistrate (Edmund Breon). Matters are brought to a head when they must go to court to plead for the dog's life before the Lord Provost.

== Cast ==
- Pal (credited as "Lassie") as Lassie
- Donald Crisp as Jock Gray
- Edmund Gwenn as John Traill
- Geraldine Brooks as Susan Brown
- Reginald Owen as Sergeant Davie
- Alan Webb as James Brown
- Ross Ford as William Traill
- Henry Stephenson as Sir Charles Loring
- Alan Napier as The Lord Provost
- Sara Allgood as Mrs MacFarland
- Edmund Breon as Magistrate
- Arthur Shields as Doctor Lee
- Lumsden Hare as Mr MacFarland
- Charles Irwin as Sergeant Major
- Vernon Downing as Soldier
- Matthew Boulton as Butcher
- Gordon Richards as Constable

== Music ==
In 2010, Film Score Monthly released the complete scores of the seven Lassie feature films released by MGM between 1943 and 1955 as well as Elmer Bernstein’s score for It's a Dog's Life (1955) in the CD collection Lassie Come Home: The Canine Cinema Collection, limited to 1000 copies. Due to the era when these scores were recorded, nearly half of the music masters have been lost, so the scores had to be reconstructed and restored from the best available sources, mainly the Music and Effects tracks as well as monaural ¼″ tapes.

The score for Challenge to Lassie was composed by André Previn. The music-and-effects tracks from Challenge to Lassie supplied by the studio were missing approximately 10 minutes of the score. In order to provide the most complete listening experience of this early Previn effort, FSM has taken these missing tracks directly from the film, incorporated in chronological film order along with the music-and-effects tracks.

Track listing for Challenge to Lassie (Disc 4)

1. Main Title and Foreword* – 1:26
2. Market Day* – 0:48
3. Lassie's First Love* – 1:10
4. First Lesson* – 0:29
5. Sheep Herding*/Jock and the Flock* – 2:41
6. You've Trained Her Well* – 0:24
7. There's My Bonnie* – 0:38
8. Jock Is Attacked* – 1:17
9. After the Fight*† – 0:44
10. Graveyard Lassie* – 0:20
11. John Sans Pants* – 0:44
12. Complaining Neighbors* – 1:03
13. The Journey*/Lassie's Last Lap* – 4:11
14. Lassoed Lassie* – 1:05
15. No Exit* – 0:48
16. Cornered Collie*† – 0:20
17. Down the Cliffs*/Here's Lassie*† – 2:09
18. I Cannot Apologize*† – 0:47
19. Laugh After Laugh*† & End Title*/End Cast – 1:18

Contains Sound Effects

†Contains Dialogue

Total Time: 23:04

== Reception ==
According to MGM records the film earned $850,000 in the US and Canada and $330,000 overseas resulting in a loss to the studio of $156,000.

== Home media ==
Challenge to Lassie was released to VHS on July 15, 1997, as part of the Lassie Collection series. It featured Geraldine Brooks on the cover with Lassie and was in a clamshell case. A second VHS version was released on September 1, 1998, featuring Donald Crisp and Lassie on the cover and in a standard slipcover case.
