= Greyfriars Bobby =

Dog that guarded its owner's grave (1855/6–1872)

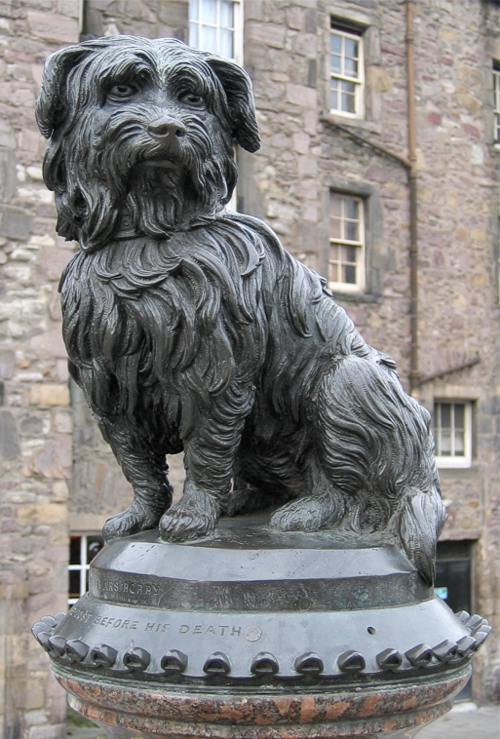
- This statue of Bobby sits at the corner of Edinburgh's Candlemaker Row and George IV Bridge, and is a Category A listed building
- Breed: Skye Terrier or Dandie Dinmont Terrier
- Born: 1855/56; Edinburgh, Scotland
- Died: 14 January 1872 (aged 16); Edinburgh, Scotland
- Resting place: Greyfriars Kirkyard
- Known for: Reportedly guarding the grave of his owner for 14 years until he died
- Owner: John Gray
- Awards: Key to the City of Edinburgh

Greyfriars Bobby (1855/56 – 14 January 1872) was a Skye Terrier or Dandie Dinmont Terrier who became known in 19th-century Edinburgh for reportedly spending 14 years guarding the grave of his owner until his death. The story continues to be well known in Scotland, through several books and films, though its accuracy is disputed. A prominent commemorative statue and nearby graves are tourist attractions.

== Traditional view ==
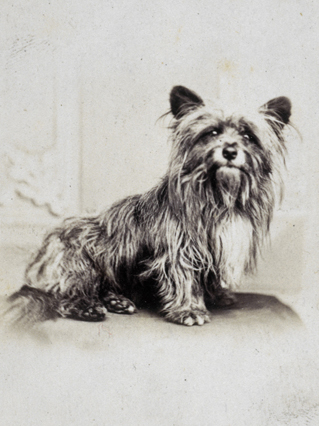
Albumen print (c. 1865) thought to be of Greyfriars Bobby

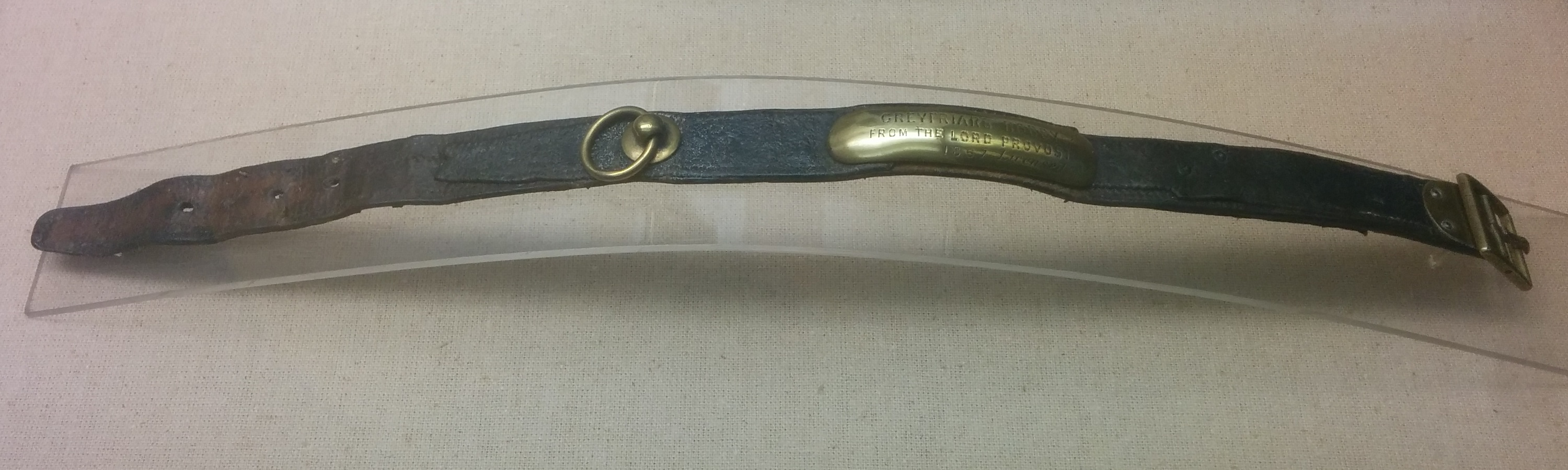
Greyfriars Bobby's collar

The best-known version of the story is that Bobby belonged to John Gray, who worked for the Edinburgh City Police as a nightwatchman. When John Gray died he was buried in Greyfriars Kirkyard, the kirkyard surrounding Greyfriars Kirk in the Old Town of Edinburgh. Bobby then became known locally, spending the rest of his life sitting on his master's grave.

In 1867 the lord provost of Edinburgh, Sir William Chambers, who was also a director of the Scottish Society for Prevention of Cruelty to Animals, paid for Bobby's licence and gave the dog a collar, now in the Museum of Edinburgh.

Bobby is said to have sat by the grave for 14 years. He died on 14 January 1872. A necropsy by Prof Thomas Walley of the Edinburgh Veterinary College concluded he had died from cancer of the jaw. He was buried just inside the gate of Greyfriars Kirkyard, not far from John Gray's grave.

A year later, the English philanthropist Lady Burdett-Coutts was charmed by the story and had a drinking fountain topped with Bobby's statue (commissioned from the sculptor William Brodie) erected at the junction of George IV Bridge and Candlemaker Row (opposite the entrance to the churchyard) to commemorate him.

=== John Gray ===
John Gray (died 15 February 1858), commonly known in popular culture as Auld Jock, was a gardener who came to Edinburgh in 1850 with his wife Jess and son, John. He avoided working in a workhouse by joining the Edinburgh City Police as a nightwatchman. Around this time he looked after Greyfriars Bobby. Bobby would follow John Gray while he was at work. According to records, policemen were obliged to have watchdogs with them. John Traill claimed that John Gray was a farmer who regularly visited his coffee house at the one o'clock gun, though this might have been embellished as Traill didn't own the coffee house until four years after John Gray had died. Gray reportedly died of tuberculosis on 15 February 1858 and was buried in Greyfriars Kirkyard. For 14 years the dog stayed at his master's graveside.

In January 2018 Gray's headstone was toppled by vandals. George Robinson of the One O'Clock Gun Association said "There are guys wandering around there totally out of their mind. You can't control that."

== Dispute over accuracy ==
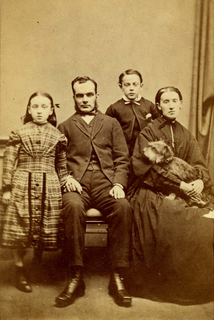
Greyfriars Bobby with John Traill and his family, 1868

The accuracy of stories of Greyfriars Bobby has been challenged many times: for instance, in Forbes Macgregor's Greyfriars Bobby: The Real Story at Last, Jan Bondeson's Greyfriars Bobby: The Most Faithful Dog in the World, and Richard Brassey's "Greyfriars Bobby The Most Famous Dog in Scotland".

Questions about the story's accuracy are not new. In a newspaper article in The Scotsman, "Greyfriars Bobby A Dog's Devotion" (11 August 1934), Councillor Wilson McLaren responds to contemporary questions about the accuracy of the stories by describing his own conversation, in 1871, with "Mr Traill" of "Traill's Coffee House" in relation to the dog he himself was then feeding, reassuring readers about the story Mr Traill had given him, and describing responses in 1889 to questions about the story's accuracy. A sense of the difficulty of determining accuracy is gained from two opposing letters to The Scotsman newspaper on 8 February 1889 (part of the debate referred to by McLaren), both from people claiming close links to Greyfriars Kirk, both claiming to have known of the dog personally but with opposing views over the accuracy of stories.

A common discussion is over which of two people named John Gray was the real owner of Bobby (one being a night watchman and the other a farmer). In Councillor McLaren's account, Mr Traill in 1871 had spoken about John Gray the farmer.

Jan Bondeson's book advances the view that fundamental claims about the dog and its loyalty are untrue. Bondeson states as background that in 19th-century Europe there were more than 60 documented accounts of graveyard or cemetery dogs. They were stray dogs, fed by visitors and curators to the point that the dogs made the graveyards their home. People began to believe that they were waiting by a grave and so the dog was looked after. Bondeson claims that after an article about Bobby appeared in The Scotsman, visitor numbers to the graveyard increased, which supposedly created a commercial benefit for the local community. Bondeson also speculates that in 1867 the original Bobby died and was replaced with a younger dog, which explains Bobby's supposed longevity.

According to Mike Macbeth's 2022 book, The Dandie Dinmont Terrier, the True Story of Scotland's Forgotten Breed, Bobby was more likely to have been a Dandie Dinmont Terrier than a Skye Terrier as is generally supposed. Macbeth, president of the Dandie Dinmont Terrier Club of Canada, pointed out that the Dandie Dinmont Terrier was extremely popular in Scotland at the time, with some 60 breeders in the Edinburgh area, whereas Skye Terriers tended to be confined to the Isle of Skye.

== Legacy ==
=== Memorials ===
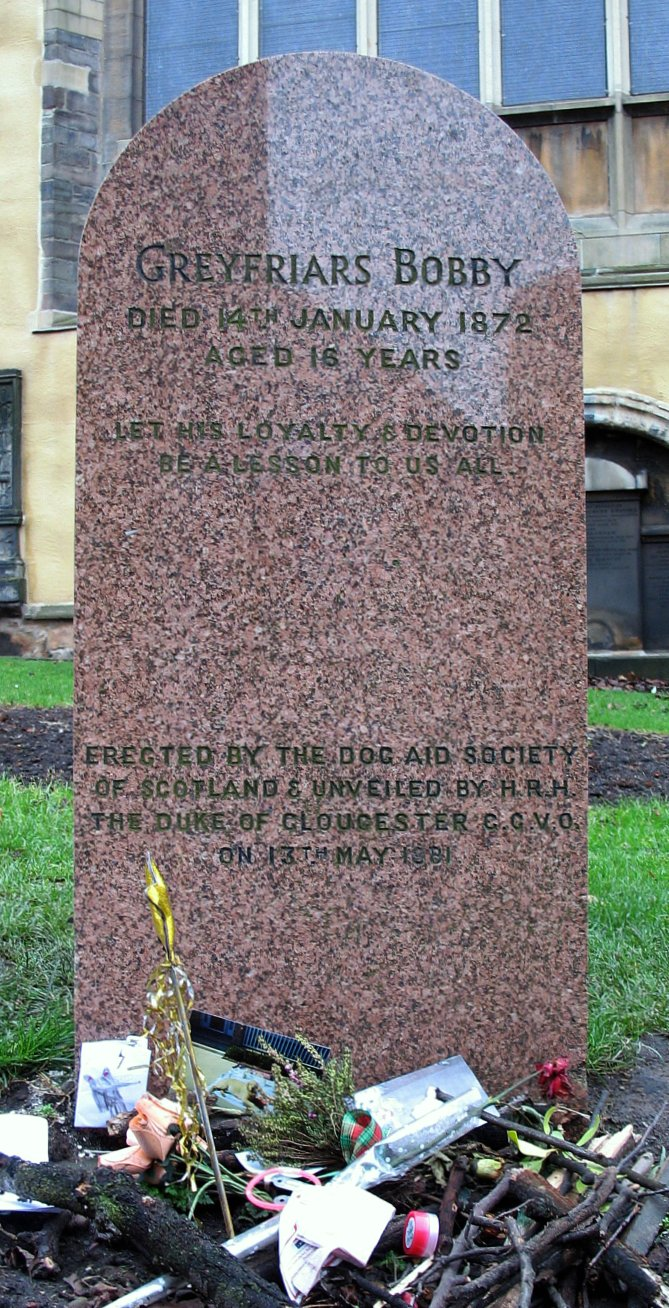
Bobby's headstone in Greyfriars Kirkyard

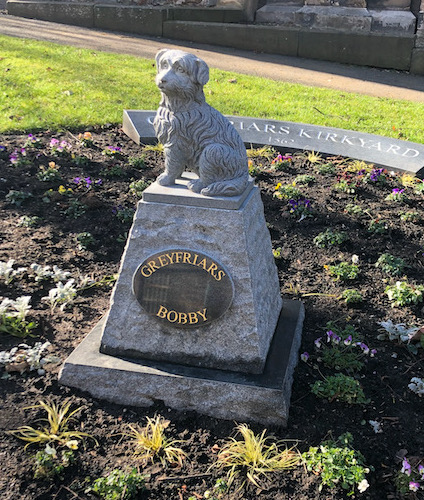
Memorial to Bobby in Greyfriars Kirkyard, erected in 2021

- Greyfriars Bobby Fountain includes a life-size statue of Greyfriars Bobby created by William Brodie in 1872, financed by Baroness Burdett-Coutts of the Coutts banking family. The monument is Edinburgh's smallest listed structure.
- Greyfriars Bobby's Bar, a pub located on the ground floor of the Candlemaker Row's houses.
- Greyfriars Bobby's headstone, erected by The Dog Aid Society of Scotland and unveiled by the Duke of Gloucester on 13 May 1981. The monument reads, "Greyfriars Bobby – Died 14 January 1872 – Aged 16 years – Let his loyalty and devotion be a lesson to us all".
- In 2021, to mark the 150th anniversary of Bobby's death, a new monument was placed close to the east wall of Greyfriars Kirk. This was ordered by Robbie Beattie, a senior manager with Edinburgh City Council's Bereavement Service. No consultation or conventional commissioning process was undertaken, despite the Kirkyard lying within a UNESCO World Heritage site.

=== Books and films directly about Bobby ===
- The 1902 historical account,The True Story of Greyfriars Bobby by Henry T. Hutton, Publisher: Edinburgh
- The 1912 novel Greyfriars Bobby by Eleanor Atkinson embellished the story and made John Gray a shepherd, known as "Auld Jock".
- The 1961 Walt Disney film Greyfriars Bobby: The True Story of a Dog, starring Donald Crisp and Laurence Naismith, was based on Atkinson’s book and has a Skye Terrier as Greyfriars Bobby.
- The 2006 film The Adventures of Greyfriars Bobby (also released in 2005 under the alternative title Greyfriars Bobby), starred James Cosmo and Christopher Lee. The Edinburgh Castle scenes in this film were actually shot at Stirling Castle. Many expressed reservations that a West Highland Terrier was cast as Bobby, and that new characters were added while one of the major characters in Bobby's life, John Traill, was omitted.

=== Other references in popular culture ===
- A British Rail class 47 number 47711 was named "Greyfriars Bobby" in 1981. One of the original nameplates now sits above the sales counter at Harburn Hobbies model shop in Edinburgh.
- Challenge to Lassie (1949) is an earlier film based on Atkinson's book, replacing Bobby with Lassie.
- The 1945 film The Body Snatcher has an oblique reference to Bobby. The title character, John Gray, played by Boris Karloff, while seeking to dig up a corpse in Greyfriars Kirkyard, encounters a dog (named "Robbie") guarding the grave. The dog is killed.
- In 1964 popular Scottish duo The Alexander Brothers recorded a song 'Greyfriars Bobby' on Pye Records, which refers to Bobby being loyal to a shepherd.
- Gaspode, a talking dog in the Discworld fantasy novels of Terry Pratchett, claims to be named after a famous dog named Gaspode with a similar story to Greyfriars Bobby, though he says it was later discovered that the reason this Gaspode stayed howling by his master's grave was that his tail was trapped under the gravestone.
- In the 2013 video game Grand Theft Auto V, developed by Edinburgh-based studio Rockstar North, a dog (either a Skye Terrier or West Highland Terrier) can be seen visiting a headstone at the Vinewood cemetery on a daily basis.
- In 2019 the Royal Lyceum Theatre in Edinburgh did a production of A Christmas Carol that relocated the events of the tale to Edinburgh a year after Auld Jock's death, attributing the old man's death to his being evicted by Ebenezer Scrooge. Bobby is depicted in the play by a puppet and is shown to be friends with Tiny Tim (also portrayed by a puppet); Scrooge's vision of the future sees Bobby being taken by the dog-catcher after Tiny Tim's death, which means there is nobody to warn Bobby. The play concludes with Scrooge using a gift left behind by the Spirit of Christmas Nooadays (the Scots equivalent of the Ghost of Christmas Present) to provide Bobby's licence, thus protecting him from the dog-catcher.
- The 2023 music video for Scottish musician Lewis Capaldi's song "Wish You the Best" features a storyline based on Greyfriars Bobby.

== See also ==
- List of individual dogs
- Bobbie the Wonder Dog
- Bamse (dog)
- Bum (San Diego dog)
- Dog on the Tuckerbox
- Fido (Italian dog)
- Hachikō
- Kostya
