= The Adventures of Greyfriars Bobby =

- Directed by: John Henderson
- Written by: John Henderson; Richard Mathews; Neville Watchurst
- Produced by: Christopher Figg; Alex Swan
- Starring: James Cosmo; Oliver Golding; Gina McKee; Ardal O'Hanlon; Sean Pertwee; Greg Wise; Christopher Lee
- Cinematography: John Ignatius
- Edited by: David Yardley
- Music by: Mark Thomas
- Production companies: Piccadilly Pictures; Ursus Films
- Distributed by: The Works UK Distribution Ltd. Universal Pictures (UK) Ltd.
- Release dates: July 2005 (Giffoni Film Festival); 10 February 2006 (UK)
- Running time: 103 minutes
- Country: United Kingdom
- Language: English
- Budget: £6 million

The Adventures of Greyfriars Bobby is a family-based British film released in the US in 2005 (as Greyfriars Bobby) and the UK in 2006, and directed by John Henderson. It is set in Edinburgh, Scotland, and tells the story of a Skye Terrier called Bobby, who will not leave his master's grave after his death. The dog faces many perils because of this, and has to endure much in his struggle to be allowed to live his life. The film is loosely based on a real dog known as Greyfriars Bobby.

== Plot ==
John Gray, the local policeman, owns Bobby the Westie, but allows a shy boy called Ewan to befriend his dog. When Gray dies and is buried in the Greyfriars Kirkyard, the dog will not leave the grave, despite his fondness for Ewan. The Greyfriars gravedigger, James Brown, takes a liking to Bobby, and gives him food and protection. However, the passing of a new dog law in Scotland threatens Bobby's very existence, and Ewan must do everything in his power to save his canine friend, even when it involves the Lord Provost of Edinburgh.

== Cast ==
- James Cosmo as James Brown, gravedigger
- Oliver Golding as Ewan Adams
- Gina McKee as Maureen Gray
- Sean Pertwee as Duncan Smithie
- Christie Mitchell as Mary McPherson
- Greg Wise as Minister Lee
- Thomas Lockyer as John Gray
- Christopher Lee as The Lord Provost
- Ronald Pickup as Cecil Johnson
- Ian Richardson as The Judge
- Ardal O'Hanlon as Coconut Tam
- Kirsty Mitchell as Ada Adams

== Production ==
Greyfriars Bobby was played by a West Highland White Terrier, when the original dog was in fact a Skye Terrier. This casting caused protests from the Skye Terrier breed club, who complained about filmmakers using an incorrect dog breed. Christopher Figg, the producer, said that a Westie was used "because its white coat would stand out in the dark and because its eyes would not be hidden from the camera by a fringe." During the early stages of planning for this film in 2003, Scottish Screen, the national development agency for the Scottish screen industries, had run a lottery worth £500,000, but withdrew the funding for the film, and it was almost made in Luxembourg instead of Scotland. While Bakehouse Close, off the Royal Mile, was used for the exterior shots of John Gray's family home, the Edinburgh Castle scenes in this film were actually shot in Stirling Castle. There was much filming in and around the old town of Stirling as well as within the grounds of Stirling Castle doubling for old Edinburgh and Greyfriars Kirk Yard as seen in the film is in fact Stirling's Old Town Cemetery with the Church of The Holy Rood in the background.

== See also ==
- Greyfriars Bobby (1961 film)
