= Alex Mackenzie =

Scottish actor (1885–1965)

Alex MacKenzie (1885 – December 1965) was a Scottish character actor who was born and died in Glasgow. He was a schoolteacher in Clydebank until he was 61, before taking up a new profession.

== Filmography ==
Year	Title	Role	Notes
1954	The Maggie	MacTaggart, the Skipper	
1955	Geordie	Macrimmon	
1958	The Kid from Canada	Mr. Macfarlane	
1958	Rockets Galore!	Joseph Macleod	
1959	The Bridal Path	Finlay	
1960	Kidnapped	The Ferryman	
1960	The Battle of the Sexes	Robertson	
1961	Greyfriars Bobby	Auld Jock	
1963	The Three Lives of Thomasina	Tammas	Final film role
