= John Traill =

Owner of Traill's Temperance Coffee House

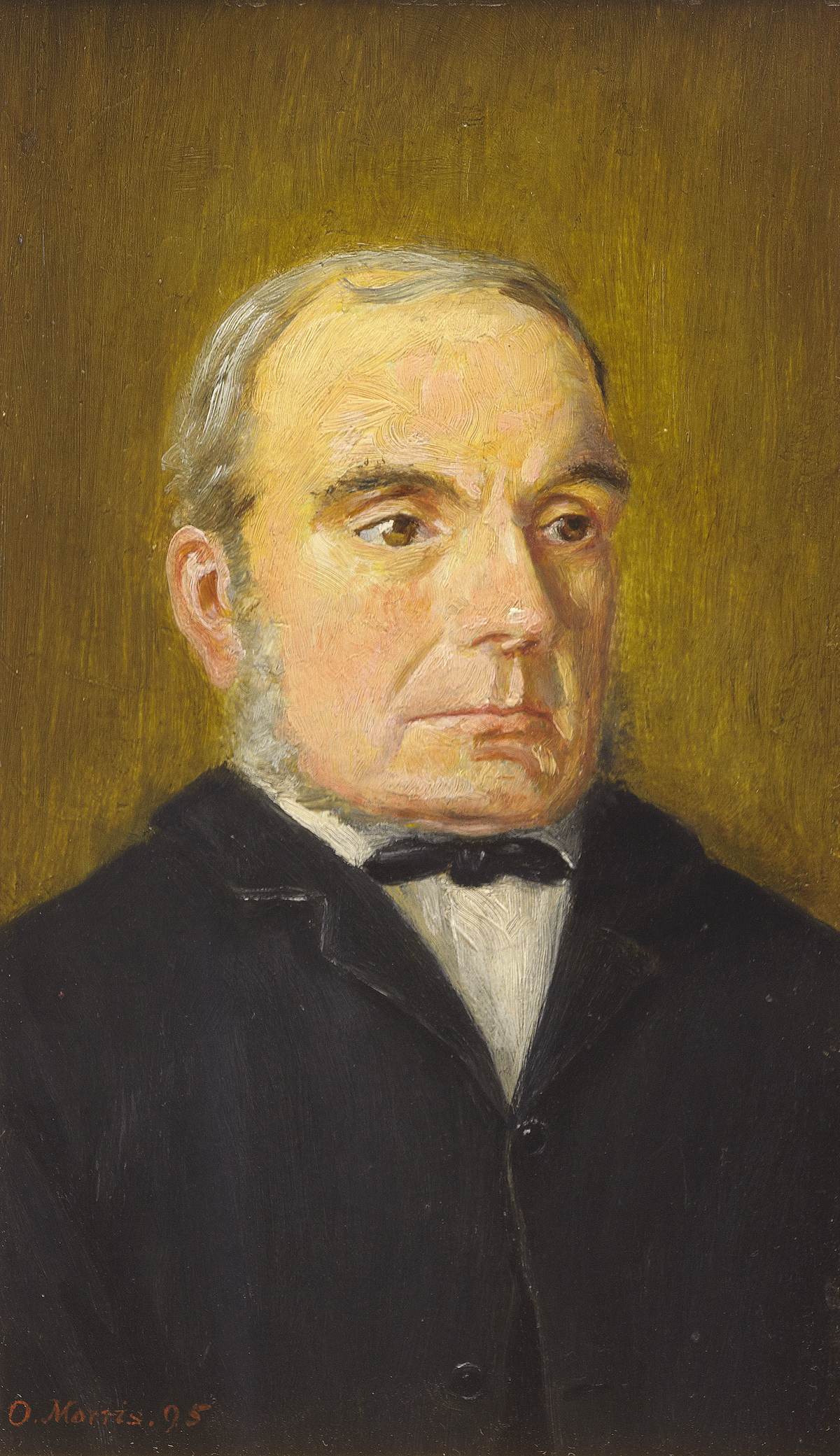
- John Traill, 1895
- Born: January 11, 1835; Dunfermline, Scotland
- Died: June 8, 1897 (aged 62); Edinburgh, Scotland
- Resting place: Newington Cemetery
- Spouse: Mary Traill
- Children: 2

John Traill (11 January 1835 – 8 June 1897) was the owner of Traill's Temperance Coffee House, which was regularly visited by Greyfriars Bobby.

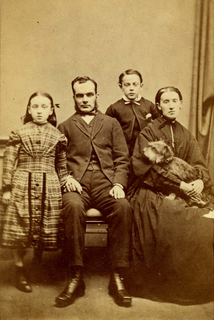
Traill and his family, with Greyfriars Bobby, 1868

== Early and personal life ==
Traill was born in 1835 in Dunfermline, and was the son of a weaver. He and his wife Mary had two children called Alexander and Elizabeth Ann.

== Traill's Temperance Coffee House ==
Traill's Temperance Coffee House was a temperance coffee house located on the ground floor of 6 Greyfriars Place. In 1975, 4, 5 and 6 Greyfriars Place were B listed by Historic Environment Scotland. In modern times, Greyfriars Bobby's Bar and Greyfriars Bobby Fountain are located in Greyfriars Place.

== Later life and death ==
In 1895, Oliver Morris painted a picture of Traill which has been on display at the City Art Centre since 1962. Traill died in 1897 and is buried at Newington Cemetery in Edinburgh.

== Cultural depictions ==
- John Traill is featured in the 1912 novel Greyfriars Bobby. Traill is depicted as the landlord of Ye Olde Greyfriars Dining-Rooms and is commonly referred to as Mr. Traill.
  - Traill is played by Edmund Gwenn in the 1949 Metro-Goldwyn-Mayer film Challenge to Lassie based on the novel.
  - Traill is played by Laurence Naismith in the 1961 Disney film Greyfriars Bobby based on the novel.
