= Greyfriars Bobby (film) =

1961 film by Don Chaffey

- Official theatrical poster
- Directed by: Don Chaffey
- Written by: Robert Westerby
- Based on: Greyfriars Bobby by Eleanor Atkinson
- Produced by: Walt Disney; Hugh Attwooll
- Starring: Donald Crisp; Laurence Naismith; Alex Mackenzie; Kay Walsh
- Cinematography: Paul Beeson
- Edited by: Peter Tanner
- Music by: Francis Chagrin
- Production company: Walt Disney Productions
- Distributed by: Buena Vista Distribution
- Release date: July 17, 1961
- Running time: 91 minutes
- Countries: United States; United Kingdom
- Language: English
- Box office: $1.4 million

Greyfriars Bobby is a 1961 drama film starring Donald Crisp and Laurence Naismith, with a screenplay by Robert Westerby based upon the 1912 children's book Greyfriars Bobby by Eleanor Atkinson which was based, in turn, upon the 19th century Edinburgh story involving a Skye Terrier that came to be known as Greyfriars Bobby, visiting his owner's grave for 14 years. The story revolves about two Scottish men who compete for the affection of Bobby. It was the second film based upon Atkinson's novel, the first being Challenge to Lassie in which Crisp also starred. The film was directed by Don Chaffey and shot at Shepperton Studios and on location in Scotland. The film has been released to DVD and Disney+.

== Plot ==
A little Skye Terrier named Bobby is the pet of a Scottish farmer and his wife but the dog has a friendship with an old kindly shepherd hired on the farm called Auld Jock. When money grows scarce on the farm, Auld Jock is fired. He travels to Edinburgh, and Bobby follows him. Auld Jock dies in poverty in an inn and is buried in Greyfriar's Kirkyard. Bobby returns to Auld Jock's grave every night to sleep.

Against the wishes of his wife, the graveyard caretaker James Brown tries to shoo Bobby away, but Bobby always finds his way back to the grave. Bobby endears himself to all, especially the neighborhood children. Brown and a restaurant owner, John Traill, compete for the affections of the dog. Brown alleges Traill should pay Bobby's license fee, which he refuses on principle, not being Bobby's master.

Mr Traill is summoned to the court for a hearing, where he pleads not guilty. Mr Brown is also present in the court, but he tells Mr Traill he is sick, and can't get out of bed. Mr Traill is told to come back the next day, with Bobby as well.

Bobby's fate rests with the Lord Provost of Edinburgh and, without a license and someone to take responsibility for Bobby, he may be destroyed. The children of Edinburgh contribute their pennies for Bobby's license. Bobby is declared a Freeman of the City and adopted by the populace of Edinburgh. The final scene shows Bobby settling down for the night on Jock's grave.

== Cast ==
- Donald Crisp as James Brown
- Laurence Naismith as John Traill
- Alex Mackenzie as Auld Jock
- Duncan Macrae as Sgt Davie Maclean
- Andrew Cruickshank as Lord Provost
- Gordon Jackson as Farmer
- Rosalie Crutchley as Farmer's Wife
- Freda Jackson as Old Woman Caretaker
- Moultrie Kelsall as Magistrate
- Joyce Carey as First Lady
- Vincent Winter as Tammy
- Jameson Clark as Constable
- Jack Lambert as Doctor
- Bruce Seton as Prosecutor
- Joan Juliet Buck as Ailie
- Hamish Wilson as Hamish
- Kay Walsh as Mrs. Brown

The dog which played Bobby belonged to a family on Stornoway on the Isle of Lewis. Named Tam, the dog was purchased from a rescue centre on the island by a 19-year-old girl. After filming was completed, the dog was briefly taken into the care of Willie Merrilees, who was chief constable of Lothian and Peebles Constabulary at the time. Merrilees had helped out during the shooting of the film in Edinburgh. He arranged for John Turner, his uncle and the constabulary's chief inspector, to become the new owner. It lived with them until its death in 1974. Its remains were interred in the Greyfriars churchyard.

== Reception ==
Kinematograph Weekly said it was a "moneymaker" at the British box office in 1961.

Variety commented: "Greyfriars Bobby sets out to melt the heart and does it skillfully. Central character is a little Skye terrier, and this engaging little animal is quite irresistible...Patiently and brilliantly trained, Bobby wraps up the stellar honors for himself and the humans, knowing they don't stand a chance, wisely are content to play chorus. Nevertheless, there are some very effective pieces of thesping, largely by Scottish actors. Laurence Naismith gives a strong, likeable performance as the kindly eating-house owner who takes Bobby under his wing."

In a 2018 review, they praised the performances of Crisp and Naismith.

== Comic book adaptation ==
- Dell Four Color #1189 (November 1961)

== See also ==
- The Adventures of Greyfriars Bobby
