= Greyfriars Bobby (novel) =

Novel by Eleanor Atkinson

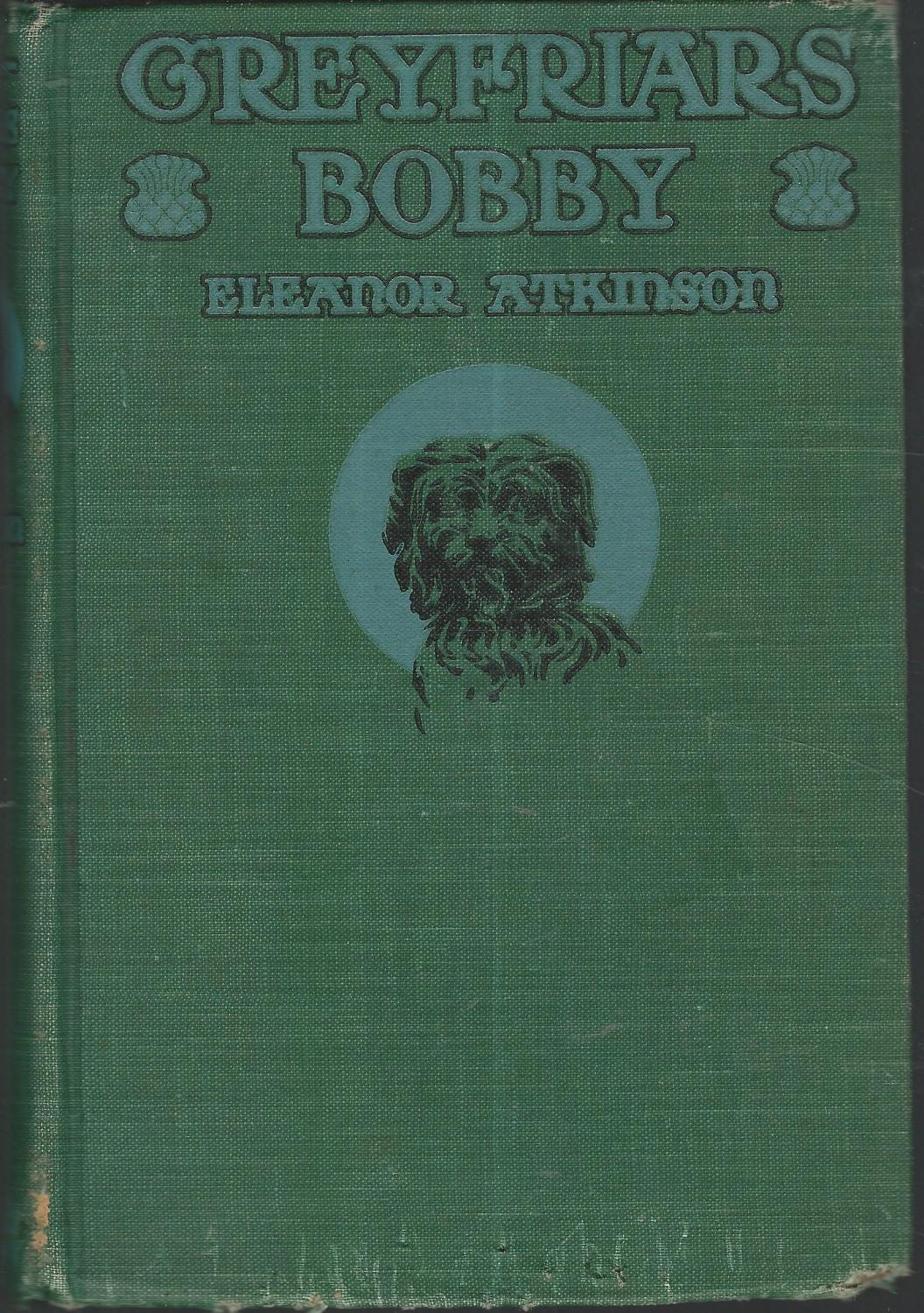
- Author: Eleanor Atkinson
- Publisher: A. L. Burt Company
- Publication date: 1912
- Publication place: United States
- Media type: Print (hardcover)
- Pages: 292
- OCLC: 1327128
- Dewey Decimal: 813.52

Greyfriars Bobby is a 1912 novel by Eleanor Atkinson based on the true story of the dog Greyfriars Bobby. The novel has been adapted into two films: Challenge to Lassie (1949) and Greyfriars Bobby (1961). Both films starred Donald Crisp. This novel is written from the point-of-view of the dog, Bobby, and uses Scottish dialogue as the novel is set in Edinburgh, Scotland.

== Plot ==
The book is written from the point of view of the titular dog. The main story of the book is directly adapted from the supposedly true Scottish story of Greyfriars Bobby.

Bobby spends much time with his master and unofficial owner, "Auld Jock" (Scots for "Old John"), creating a very strong emotional connection. They have an intense connection and Jock cares for Bobby very well—though Jock never bought Bobby. This creates problems later, because of Jock's having, in the eyes of the law, "stolen" an unlicensed dog. Eventually, Auld Jock dies. Bobby is in great distress, but a loyal dog will never leave its owner's side, even after death.

After his owner dies, Bobby is lost; he can barely function without his companion. Though his owner's body was identified by the man's given name, John Gray, and not as "Auld Jock", his nickname, people still tell Bobby to look for "Jock", which just worsens Bobby's pain. He is lost for a while, and a large reward is offered for his return. Eventually, Bobby finds Auld Jock's grave and guards it day and night. The pair are inseparable.

== Characters ==
Bobby

Bobby is a Skye terrier from a heathery slope of the Pentland Hills.

Auld Jock

Auld Jock is Bobby's owner.

Mr. John Traill

Mr. John Traill is the owner of Ye Olde Greyfriars Dining-Rooms and a landlord.

Sergeant Scott

Sergeant Scott is an officer of the Royal Engineers.

Private McLean

Private McLean is Sergeant Scott's private. McLean took care of Scott's belongings.

James Brown

James Brown (or Mr. Brown) is the curator of the cemetery where Auld Jock was buried.

Ailie and Tammy

Ailie and Tammy are children from the tenements of Edinburgh.

== Background ==
This novel is based on the true Scottish story of Greyfriars Bobby. Prior to this 1912 novel, there were many conflicting accounts of the legend, due to inconsistencies being passed down through generations of Scottish families. Eleanor Atkinson's novel served as a standardization and popularization of the story in the United States. Interestingly, Eleanor Atkinson had never been to Scotland in her life, but wrote extremely detailed depictions of landscapes of Edinburgh and the Borders, implying that she was very familiar with the country through extensive research. Atkinson also very accurately depicts Scottish dialogue, a feat that suggests she wrote the book with the help of Scottish immigrants to the Midwest.

The novel was on the market for 17 years, marketed at adults, before an illustrated children's version was released. Atkinson discusses how this is a result of the book being passed down from adults to their children, finding its way into schools' reading lists. She says the book was not written with a young audience in mind, and she credits this lack of simplification for younger audiences with the success of her work.
