= Alexander Brodie (sculptor) =

Scottish sculptor

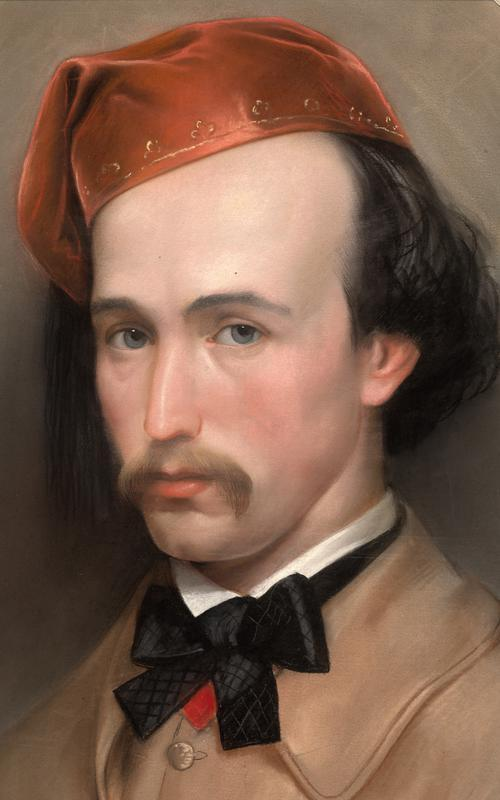
- Portrait by John Bucknell Russell, 1858
- Born: 1830; Aberdeen, Scotland
- Died: 30 May 1867 (aged 36–37); Aberdeen, Scotland
- Education: Royal Scottish Academy
- Occupation: Sculptor
- Relatives: William Brodie (brother)

Alexander Brodie (1830 – 30 May 1867) was a Scottish sculptor.

== Biography ==
Brodie was the younger son of John Brodie, mariner. He was born in 1830 at Aberdeen, where he served his apprenticeship as a brass-finisher in the foundry of Messrs. Blaikie Brothers. Like his elder brother, William Brodie, he early manifested a taste for modelling figures. About 1856 he attended the school of the Royal Scottish Academy. He visited England, and after about a year's absence resumed his residence at Aberdeen, where he received many commissions. His talents were shown by his "Motherless Lassie," his "Highland Mary," his "Cupid and Mask," and a small statue of "Grief strewing Flowers" upon a grave in front of the West Church in the city burying-ground. Encouraged by Sheriff Watson, Brodie undertook bust-portraiture and medallions, in both of which he was eminently successful. Embarrassed by the amount of work entrusted to him, his mind lost its balance, and he died 30 May 1867 by his own hand in Aberdeen.

Brodie's best known productions are his large statue of the late Duke of Richmond, erected in the public square of Huntly, and the statue of Queen Victoria in marble which stands at the corner of Nicholas Street, Aberdeen. Brodie had personal sittings with the queen at Balmoral Castle.
