= The Bridal Path (film) =

1959 British film by Sidney Gilliat

- British 1-sheet poster
- Directed by: Frank Launder
- Written by: Nigel Tranter; Frank Launder; Geoffrey Willans
- Produced by: Sidney Gilliat; Frank Launder
- Starring: Bill Travers; George Cole; Bernadette O'Farrell
- Cinematography: Arthur Ibbetson
- Edited by: Geoffrey Foot
- Music by: Cedric Thorpe Davie
- Production company: Vale Film Productions
- Distributed by: British Lion Film Corporation
- Release date: 5 August 1959
- Running time: 95 minutes
- Country: United Kingdom
- Language: English
- Budget: £162,634

The Bridal Path is a 1959 British comedy film directed by Frank Launder and starring Bill Travers, George Cole and Bernadette O'Farrell. It is based on the 1952 novel of the same name by Nigel Tranter. The film was an unsuccessful attempt to repeat the success of Launder and Gilliat's earlier Geordie (1955).

== Cast ==
- Bill Travers as Ewan McEwan
- George Cole as Police Sergeant Bruce
- Bernadette O'Farrell as Siona Campbell
- Duncan Macrae as Headquarters Police Sergeant
- Alex Mackenzie as Finlay
- Patricia Bredin as Margaret
- Fiona Clyne as Katie
- Dilys Laye as Isobel
- Eddie Byrne as Mike Flanagan
- Terry Scott as Police Constable Donald
- Gordon Jackson as Police Constable Alec
- Roddy McMillan as Murdo
- Joan Benham as barmaid
- Pekoe Ainley as Craigie
- Joan Fitzpatrick as Sarah
- Nell Ballantyne as Jessie
- Jameson Clark as Police Constable at crossroads
- Jack Lambert as Hector
- Annette Crosbie as 1st waitress
- Molly Weir as 2nd waitress
- Graham Crowden as man giving directions to the beach (uncredited)

== Plot ==
Ewan McEwan, an easy-going sheep and corn farmer on Beigg, a (fictional) Scottish island, is unable to marry his childhood sweetheart Katie as his hell-raising preacher uncle is opposed to consanguinity – all the islanders are related to each other. When Katie leaves for Glasgow to train as a nurse, he is persuaded to find a wife on the mainland (which he has never visited).

Withdrawing £400 from the £800 he has saved in a bank in Oban, he sets out to meet the local girls. He has been advised by the islanders of what they think he should look for in a potential wife: strong legs, wide hips, knowledge of cows and sheep, and also not a "candle burning Catholic" or a Campbell.

His innocent close inspection of the girls he meets raises their suspicions. The first girl, inspired by a lurid paperback novel she is reading thinks he's a white slaver and so informs the local police. He then becomes a wanted fugitive after he 'borrows' a policeman's bicycle. Then he is mistaken for the leader of a gang of salmon poachers who use dynamite. The police eventually arrest the innocent Ewan on a wide variety of charges, but don't believe his story. Held overnight at the local police sergeant's home (there is no jail), he easily escapes custody and resumes his flight, still examining all the girls he meets.

After two sisters that he takes refuge with come to blows over him, he takes their boat (leaving the money agreed upon) and hitches a passage with a fishing boat. The boat is taken over by fishermen from a nearby island who think they are encroaching on their fishing grounds, and Ewan is locked in a shed. He is rescued by a local girl and they row back to Ewan's home island.

By now he's had enough of searching, and is starving, since he hasn't managed to have a square meal whilst on the run. He and Katie decide to marry anyway, despite the ban on consanguinity.

== Production ==
Filming started in July 1958 on location in Oban.

== Reception ==
=== Box Office ===
According to Kinematograph Weekly the film performed "better than average" at the British box office in 1959.

=== Critical ===
The Monthly Film Bulletin wrote: "There are certain minor compensations to this extended Technicolor view of Bill Travers, rucksack at the ready, striding dourly up hill and down dale to the songs of the Campbeltown Gaelic Choir. The scenery is admirable, the script good-natured, managing its risqueries with shrewd calculation and about as much offence as tea-room toast. But the aggregate of all this tourist's bag of Highland charm can hardly claim to provide a single laudable reason why so much time and talent should have been spent on it."

Variety wrote: "The Launder-Gilliat team again has used their contract star, Bill Travers, in the sort of film in which he made his name, Geordie. But this time, though there's a fair amount of fun in Bridal Path the joke wears a shade thin. ...Without being a natural comedian, Travers has a likeable personality and helps to carry the pic to a pleasant conclusion. He is helped mightily by Launder's direction and by Arthur Ibbetson's lensing of the Scottish scenery."

The New York Times wrote: "There is little that is explosive in this gentle spoof ... the principals are properly dour, colloquial, restrained and pleasingly comic. ... But the wonderful oddball qualities of the Hebridean folk, on whom British moviemakers have been focusing cameras since Tight Little Island [1949] is evident here ... Fiona Clyne is pretty and sharp as his cousin; Alex Mackenzie is as Scottish as a thistle as the island elder, and George Cole, as a fumbling constable, and Bernadette O'Farrell, Patricia Bredin and Dilys Laye do well among the coterie of women to whom our hapless hero is exposed.Their "Bridal Path" does not take any unexpected turns but a viewer can have a nice time and some giggles along the way.
