= Greyfriars Bobby Fountain =

Memorial fountain in Edinburgh, Scotland

- Fuaran Greyfriars Bobby (Scottish Gaelic)
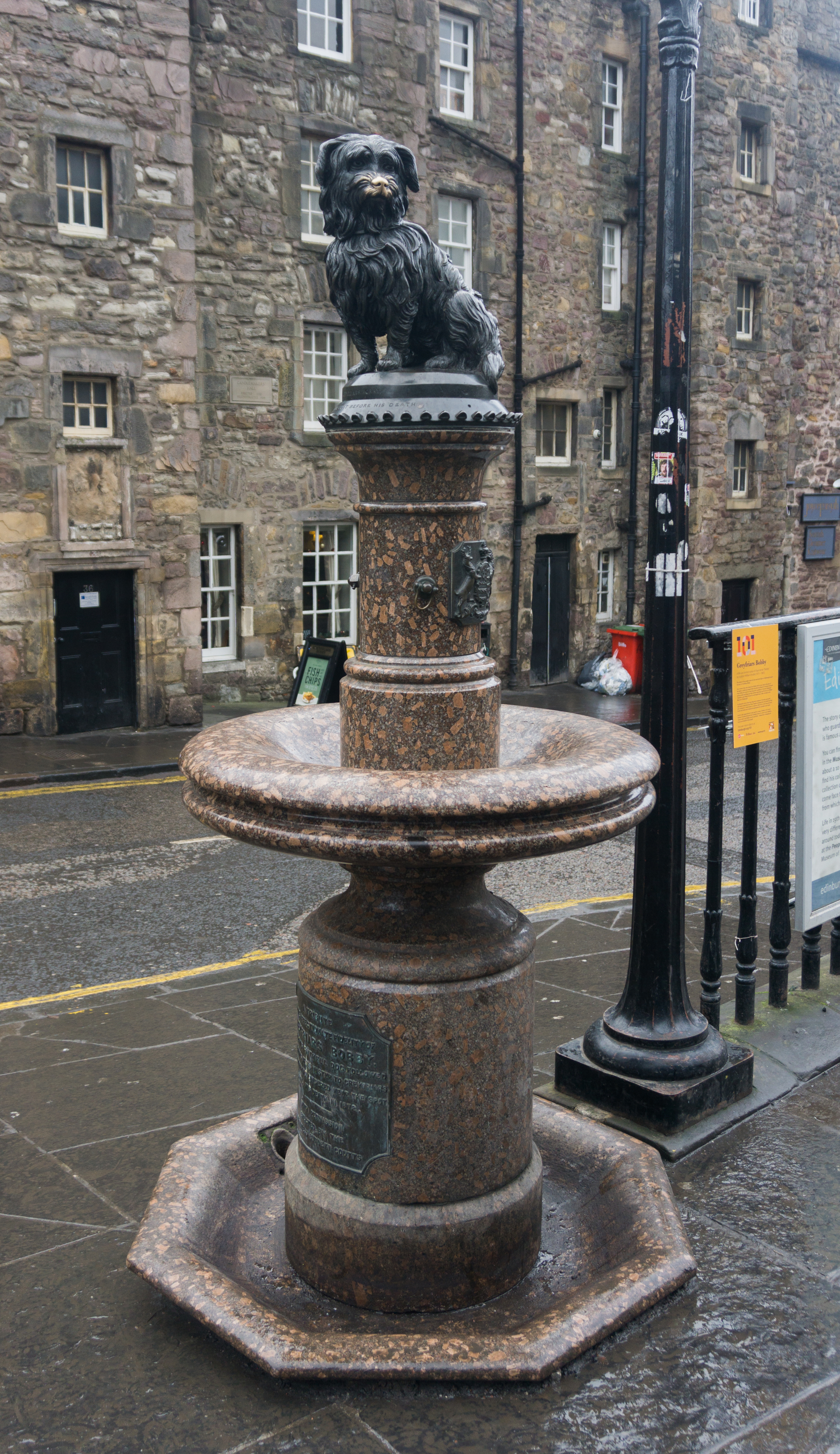
- The fountain on Candlemaker Row

- Location in Edinburgh City Centre
- Interactive map of Greyfriars Bobby Fountain
- Location: 26A Candlemaker Row; Edinburgh; EH1 2QE; Scotland
- Coordinates: 55°56′49″N 3°11′29″W
- Designer: William Brodie
- Material: Bronze and granite
- Height: 3 feet (91 cm)
- Opening date: 1873
- Restored date: 1985
- Dedicated to: Greyfriars Bobby

Listed Building – Category A
- Official name: George IV Bridge, Greyfriars Bobby Fountain
- Designated: 29 April 1977
- Reference no.: LB27899

The Greyfriars Bobby Fountain is a granite fountain in Edinburgh, surmounted by a bronze life-size statue of Greyfriars Bobby, a Skye Terrier or Dandie Dinmont Terrier who became known in 19th-century Edinburgh for supposedly spending 14 years guarding the grave of his owner John Gray, until the dog himself died on 14 January 1872.

The fountain is located at the southern end of George IV Bridge, to the immediate east of Greyfriars Kirkyard and adjacent to the National Museum of Scotland. It was unveiled on 15 November 1873 and is Edinburgh's smallest listed building.

== History and design ==
The memorial was commissioned by Lady Burdett-Coutts, president of the Ladies Committee of the RSPCA, shortly before the dog died, and the bronze statue was made from life by William Brodie. At the time, Brodie was making statues of characters from Walter Scott's Waverley novels for the Scott Monument in Princes Street.

The statue is mounted on a polished column of granite, 3 feet (91 cm) high and 20 inches (51 cm) in diameter, above a polished granite basin 3 feet (91 cm) in diameter, mounted on a plinth, with an octagonal drinking trough at ground level. Bronze plaques are mounted on the column. The fountain was originally furnished with two bronze drinking cups which were attached to the column by a chain. The supply of water to the fountain was discontinued in 1957, and the monument was neglected until its restoration in 1985.

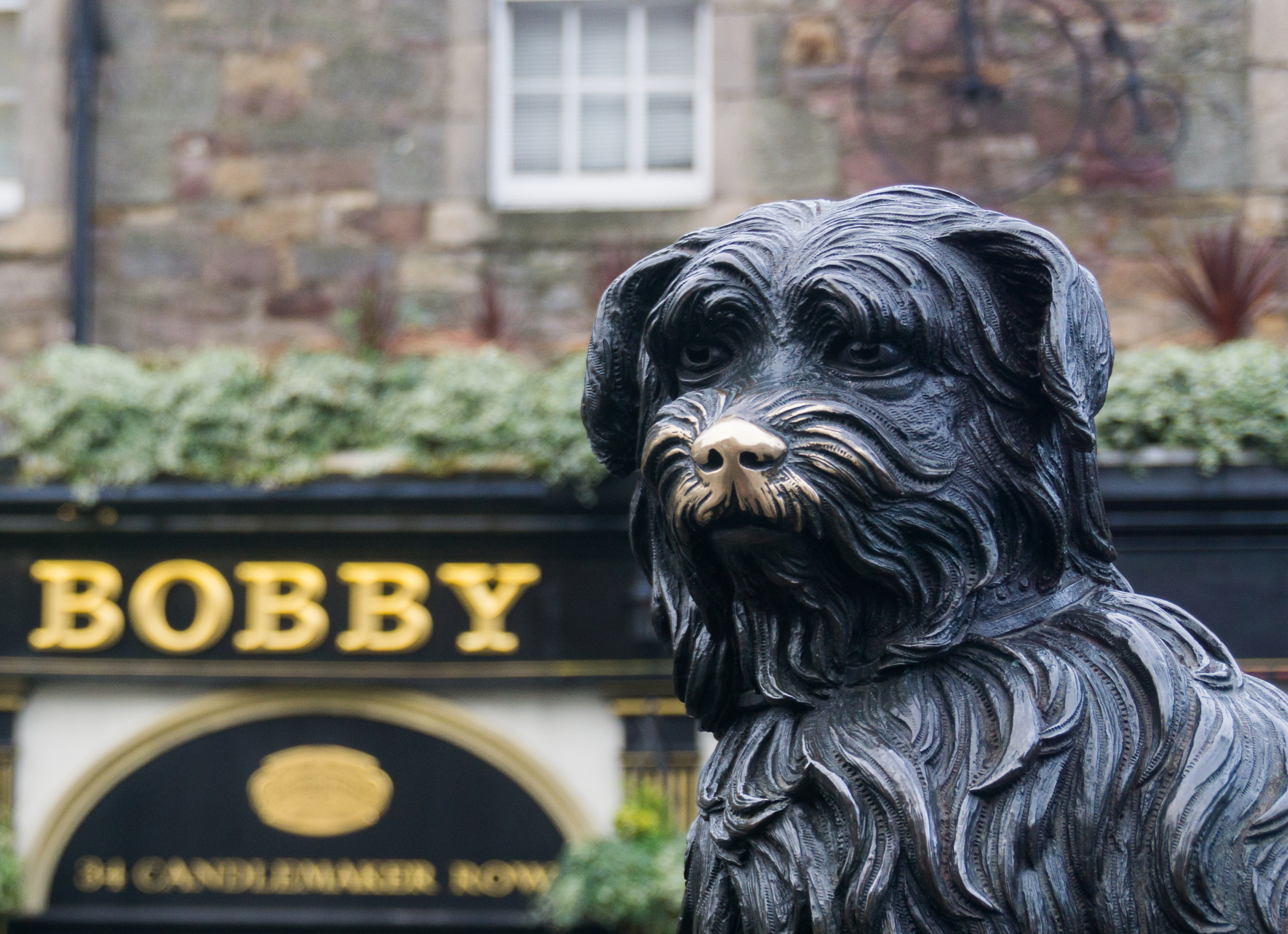
A close up of the statue's nose, highlighting its erosion

=== Rubbing the nose ===
The statue's nose is a popular feature for tourists, who believe that it brings luck if rubbed. The City of Edinburgh Council discourages this as it causes damage to the structure, and Edinburgh residents have campaigned to discourage the tradition.
