= The Battle of the Sexes (1959 film) =

1959 British film by Charles Crichton

- Theatrical release poster
- Directed by: Charles Crichton
- Written by: Monja Danischewsky
- Based on: The Catbird Seat by James Thurber
- Produced by: Monja Danischewsky
- Starring: Peter Sellers; Robert Morley; Constance Cummings
- Narrated by: Sam Wanamaker
- Cinematography: Freddie Francis
- Edited by: Seth Holt
- Music by: Stanley Black
- Production company: Prometheus Film Productions Ltd.
- Distributed by: Bryanston Films
- Release dates: 25 February 1960 (UK); 18 April 1960 (US)
- Running time: 80 minutes
- Country: United Kingdom
- Language: English
- Budget: £133,060

The Battle of the Sexes is a 1959 British black and white comedy film directed by Charles Crichton and starring Peter Sellers, Robert Morley, and Constance Cummings. It was written by Monja Danischewsky based on the 1942 short story "The Catbird Seat" by James Thurber. A timid accountant in a Scottish Tweed weaving company cleverly bests a brash modern American efficiency expert whose ideas threaten his way of life.

== Plot ==
Mr Martin, the accountant for a Scottish Tweed weaving company, is in Edinburgh buying whisky and cigarettes on the Royal Mile. He is called to the death-bed of the owner, old MacPherson, at Moray Place. MacPherson offers him a whisky but Martin declines, so MacPherson drinks for the two and promptly dies.

The new owner of the Tweed company, young MacPherson, is enamoured of a zealous American woman, Angela Barrows, who is an efficiency expert and wants to turn her hand to revolutionising the very traditional company. She insists on visiting "the factory" on the Hebrides islands, only to discover that the work is done by old couples, on crofts where they spin the wool.

She plans to replace the 700 weavers, dotted across the islands, with a single large factory. While being driven through the city, she also says the company should change to synthetic fibres, causing the chauffeur to drive into the back of a brewer's dray.

Mr. Martin watches a Sherlock Holmes film at the cinema and is inspired to kill Mrs. Barrows. As he is a non-smoker and a non-drinker, he decides he can mislead any future investigation by smoking and drinking at the scene of the planned crime. He buys a half-bottle of whisky and a packet of cigarettes. However, in her flat, after a series of botched attempts, his conscience gets the better of him and he cannot kill her.

He tries to remove all evidence when young MacPherson suddenly appears, and manages to avoid detection. Back in the office, MacPherson interrogates Martin and finds his denial more plausible than Mrs. Barrows' claims. She cannot take any more, accuses them all of being mad, and leaves for good. Thus Mr. Martin wins his "battle of the sexes". Later, seeing her crying at the station, he is moved to buy her a flower.

== Cast ==
- Peter Sellers as Mr. Martin
- Robert Morley as Robert MacPherson
- Constance Cummings as Angela Barrows
- Jameson Clark as Andrew Darling
- Ernest Thesiger as Old Macpherson
- Donald Pleasence as Irwin Hoffman
- Moultrie Kelsall as Graham
- Alex Mackenzie as Robertson
- Roddy McMillan as Macleod
- Michael Goodliffe as detective (on film in cinema)
- Noel Howlett as Mr. White
- Abe Barker as Mr Meekie
- William Mervyn as detective's friend (on film in cinema)
- Patricia Hayes as Jeannie Macdougall
- Fred Griffiths as railway porter
- Glyn Houston as railway porter

== Production ==
Film rights to the story were owned by Hecht Hill Lancaster. Billy Wilder was signed to direct. Then Charles Crichton was brought out from London to direct the film but it didn't proceed. Eventually they sold the rights.

It was the first film made by the newly-formed Bryanston Films, who approved it on 13 May 1959. Crichton liked the script, felt Robert Morley was "slightly miscast... but I think it was about the best performance Peter Sellers ever gave in his life."

== Reception ==
=== Box office ===
The film was a minor box office hit earning Bryanston a profit of £10,894. Kine Weekly called it a "money maker" at the British box office.

=== Critical ===
The Monthly Film Bulletin wrote: "Though traces of Thurber remain visible, Monja Danischewsky's script concentrates on obvious humour – stock Scottish types, routine tradition-versus-automation skirmishes – and eschews the rigorous discipline of satire for easy-going, Ealing-inherited burlesque. There are a couple of clever twists, and a moderately successful attempt to pull off a chaotic murder sequence in the manner of Unfaithfully Yours; but these few good moments fail to atone for stretches of flatness and repetition, emphasised by Charles Crichton's surprisingly slack handling. For the rest, Robert Morley, Constance Cummings and a familiar Scottish cast labour hard to work variations on their predictable comic turns, and Peter Sellers – relying perhaps a shade unnecessarily on a beautifully coiffured white wig and David Kossoff's mannerisms – gives another not unamusing one-man show."

Kine Weekly wrote: "Thepicture opens promisingly and the twist ending is quite good theatre, but laughs are difficult to come by during the middle stages. Constance Cummings has her moments as Mrs. Barrows, and Robert Morley is a polished stooge as Robert, but Peter Sellers, aping David Kossoff's style, easily walks away with the honours, such as they are, as Martin. Its verbal cracks, like the physical gags, occasionally crackle, but by eschewing popular romance the comedy sacrifices teenage pull and appears longer than it is."

The New York Times critic A. H. Weiler called it a "gentle, tongue-in-cheek ribbing that cleaves to the spirit, if not entirely to the letter of Thurber's lampoon."

Stanley Kauffmann of The New Republic wrote: The Battle of the Sexes, transfers James Thurber's story The Catbird Seat to Scotland and spins it out to unjustified length. There is only one long joke in the picture, full of predictable padding.
