= William Brodie (sculptor) =

Scottish sculptor

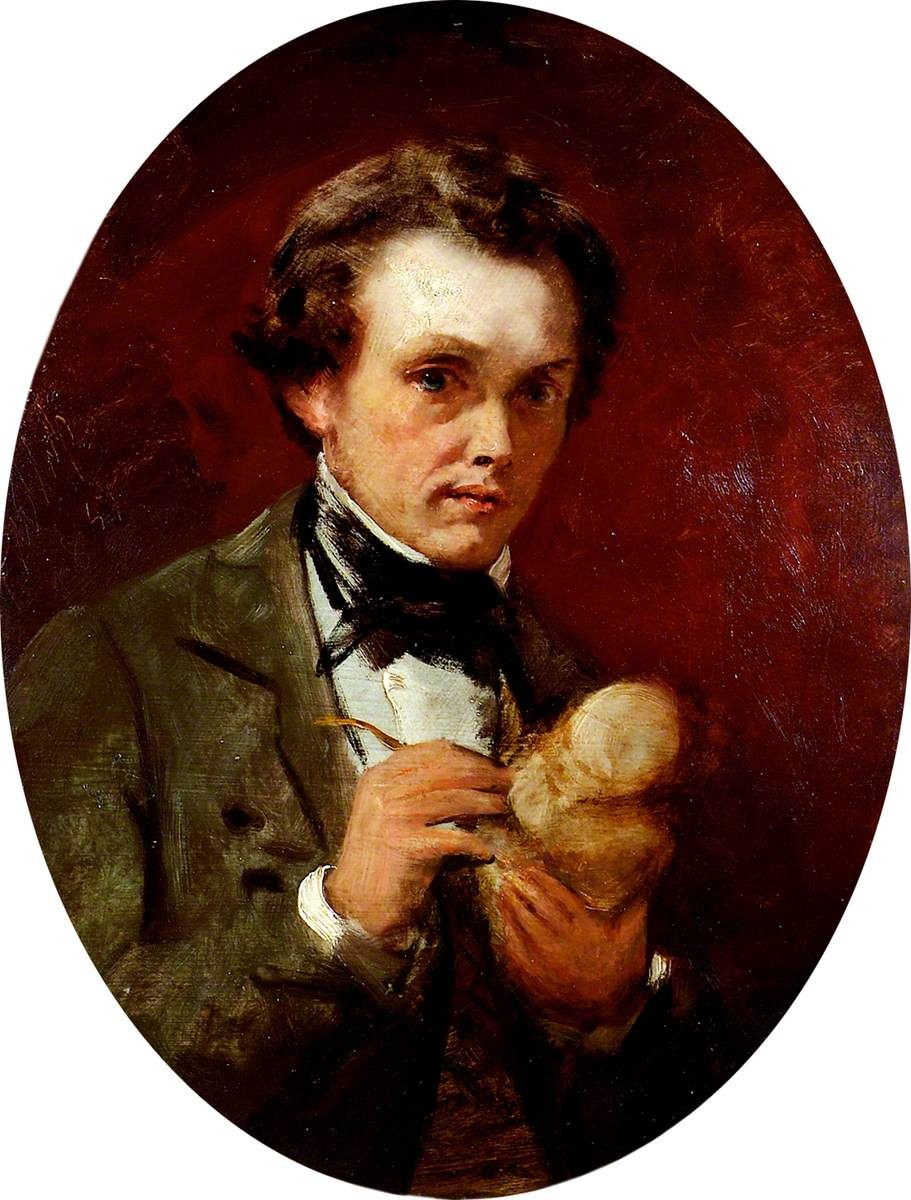
William Brodie by John Phillip

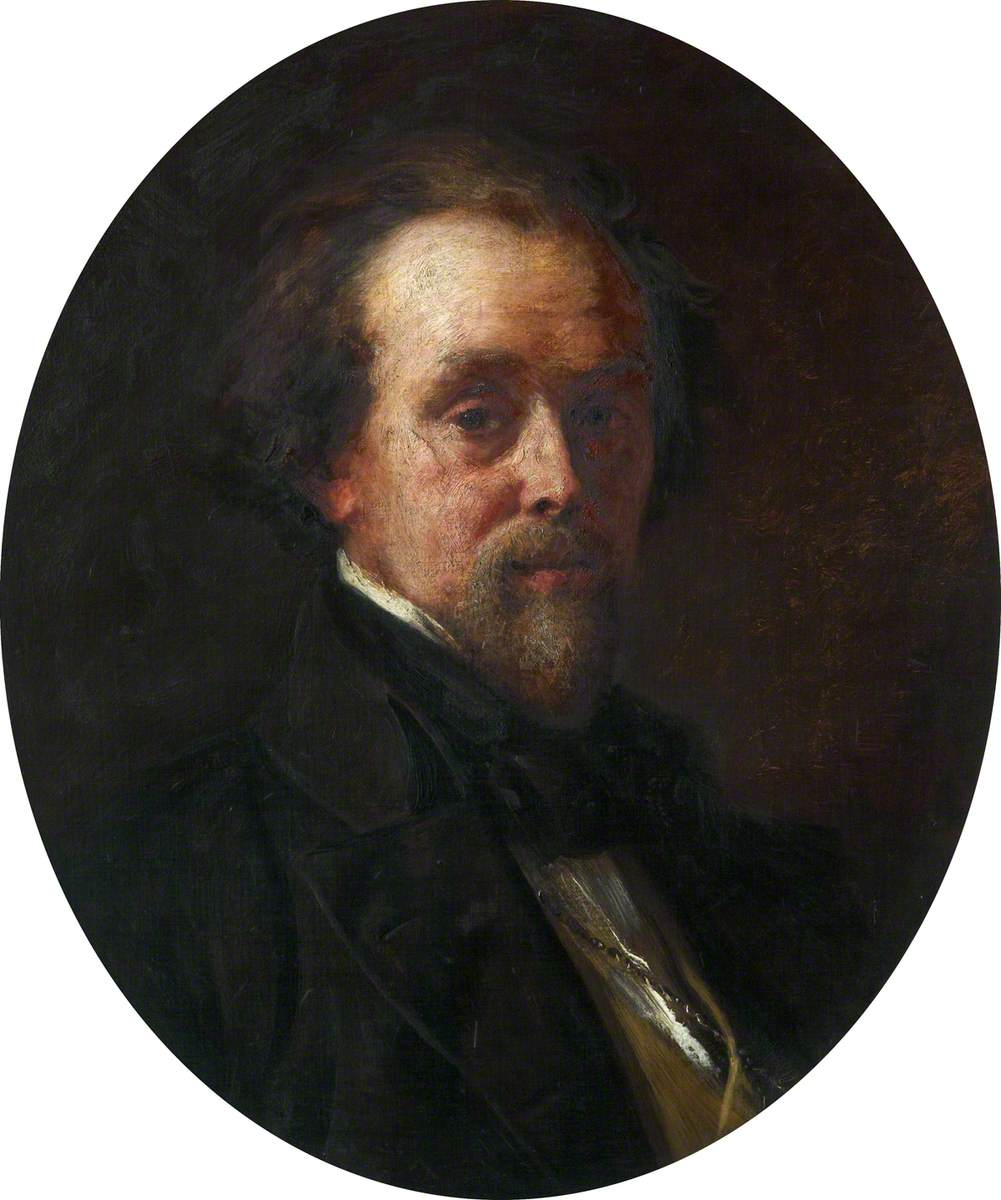
William Brodie by John Phillip

William Brodie (22 January 1815 – 30 October 1881) was a Scottish sculptor who worked in Edinburgh.

== Life ==
He was the son of John Brodie, a Banff shipmaster, and elder brother of Alexander Brodie (1830–1867), also a sculptor. When he was about six years old, his family moved to Aberdeen. William Brodie was later apprenticed to a plumber, studying in his spare time at the Mechanic's Institute, where he amused himself by casting lead figures of well-known people. He soon began to model small medallion portraits which attracted the attention of John Hill Burton. It was Burton who encouraged him to go to Edinburgh in 1847. Here Brodie studied for four years at the Trustees' School of Design, learning to model on a larger scale, and also executing a bust of one of his earliest patrons, Lord Jeffrey. At this time he lived at 14 Heriot Place in the Lauriston district of Edinburgh.

About 1853 he went to Rome, where he studied under Lawrence Macdonald, and it was with the latter's assistance that he modelled "Corinna, the Lyric Muse", a work which Copeland reproduced in miniature in Parian four years later.

Brodie was elected Associate of the Royal Scottish Academy (RSA) in 1857, and Royal Scottish Academician in 1859. In 1876 he was appointed secretary of the RSA, a post he held until his death.

In 1875, he made the group of "A Peer and His Lady Doing Homage" for the Prince Consort Memorial in Edinburgh.

Brodie exhibited at the Royal Academy, 1850–1881, and at the Royal Scottish Academy, 1847–1881; at the Great Exhibition of 1851 he showed a group of "Little Nell and Her Grandfather" (characters from Dickens' The Old Curiosity Shop). His most famous work is probably the Greyfriars Bobby Fountain.

Brodie died at his home at 9 Cambridge Street, Edinburgh, on 30 October 1881. He is buried with his wife and daughter in the Dean Cemetery under a simple granite monument surmounted by an urn, unlike his far grander monuments to others around him. The grave lies on the north side of the main east-west path, west of the large Beattie obelisk. The urn bears a carving of a caterpillar being reborn as a butterfly, a Greek symbol indicating a belief in reincarnation or a second life beyond death.

== Family ==
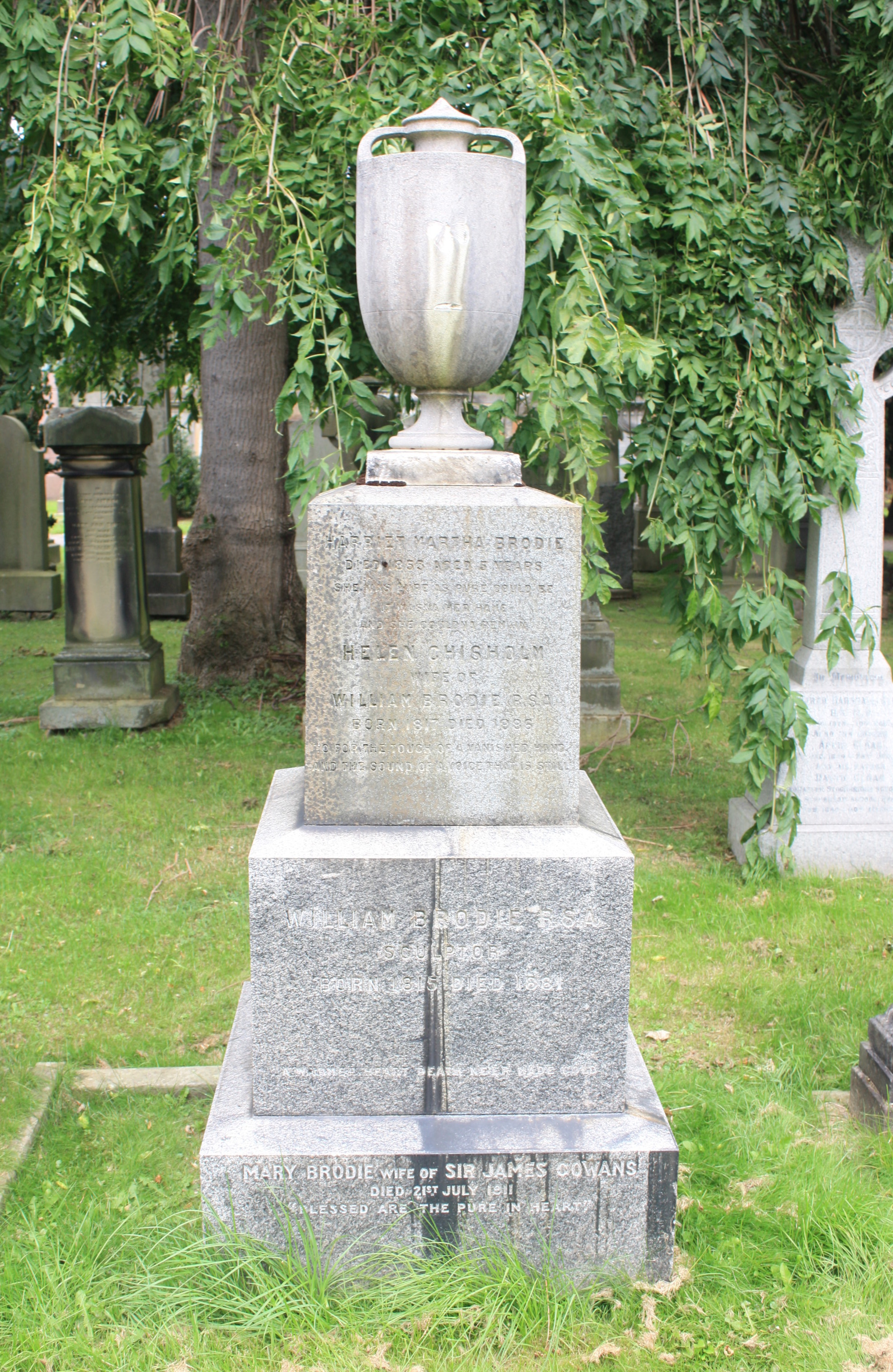
The grave of Brodie at Dean Cemetery

Brodie was married to Helen Chisholm (1817–1886). Their daughter Mary Brodie married the Edinburgh architect, Sir James Gowans. Both are buried with him in Dean Cemetery.

== Trained by Brodie ==
- Amelia Robertson Hill (1820–1904)
- David Watson Stevenson (1842–1904)

== List of works ==
- Bust of Sir Thomas Dick-Lauder (exhibited at RSA 1847)
- Bronze statue of Hercules (1850) now at Portmeirion, Wales.
- Statuary group "Little Nell and her Grandfather", at the Great Exhibition (1851)
- Bust of Lord Jeffrey (exhibited at RSA 1850)
- Bust of Lord Cockburn (exhibited at RSA 1855). Now in the NE corner of Parliament Hall in Edinburgh's Law Courts.
- Bust of the Duke of Argyll for Dunrobin Castle (1855)
- Statue of Hecamede for the Rt. Hon. Henry Labouchere (1856)
- Bust of Lord Alfred Tennyson (exhibited at RSA 1857)
- Bust of Lord Dunfermline Scottish National Portrait Gallery (1858)
- Statue of Oenone, Avington Park, Hants. (1858)
- Bust, "Laura", at Bowood (1858)
- Bust of Hugh Miller, Scottish National Portrait Gallery (1858)
- James Buchanan Monument, Dean Cemetery, Edinburgh (1860)
- Bust of George Kinnaird, National Gallery of Scotland (1860)
- Memorial to the 93rd Sutherland Highlanders in the Indian Mutiny, within St. Giles Cathedral, Edinburgh (1860)
- Bronze relief portrait on the gravestone of Rev. Duncan MacFarlan, Glasgow Necropolis (1860)
- Statue of Dr. Thomas Alexander, director general of the Army Medical Department during the Crimean War, Prestonpans (1862)
- Bust of Professor John Stuart Blackie, Scottish National Portrait Gallery (1863)
- Funerary monument to John Graham Gilbert, Glasgow Necropolis (1863).
- Monument to the 71st Highland Light Infantry in Glasgow Cathedral (1863)
- Bas-relief heads of the Cowans flanking the doorway of the Royal Bank Stationery Warehouse on West Register Street, Edinburgh (1864)
- Statue of Albert, Prince Consort, Perth (1864)
- Statue of Lady Kinnaird (exhibited Royal Academy 1866)
- Bas-relief portrait heads of Alexander Runciman and John Runciman on the west outer wall of Canongate Kirk on the Royal Mile, Edinburgh (1866)
- Bust of Queen Victoria, Balmoral (1868)
- Bust of Dr Adams, University of Aberdeen (1868)
- Monument to Alexander Smith, Warriston Cemetery (1868)
- Bust of John Phillip RA, (exhibited Royal Academy 1868)
- Bust of Alexander MacDuff of Bonhard, Perth Museum (1868)
- Bust of Miss Ada Barclay, Scottish National Gallery (1869)
- Marble statue of John Graham Gilbert in Kelvingrove Art Gallery Glasgow (1870)
- Marble bust of Thomas Jamieson Boyd, Lord Provost of Edinburgh (1871)
- Statue of Dr Thomas Graham, George Square, Glasgow (1872)
- The Greyfriars Bobby Fountain on the corner of George IV Bridge and Candlemaker Row in Edinburgh (1872)
- Statue of St. Andrew on the Life Insurance Building, 28–36 Renfield Street Glasgow (1872). Opposite a statue of St. Mungo by G E Ewing. Demolished 1929.
- Bust of Mrs Farquharson of Invercauld (exhibited RSA 1873)
- Figure of "Young Scholar" on the Buchanan Institute, Greenhead Street, Glasgow (1873)
- Monument to Dr Thomas Guthrie in St Columba's Free Church on Johnston Terrace, Edinburgh (1873)
- Monument to Rev. John Paul in St. Cuthbert's, Edinburgh (1873)
- Bust of Baroness Burdett-Coutts, for the Coutts Bank (1873)
- Portrait medallion on the grave of Robert William Thomson (engineer), Dean Cemetery, Edinburgh (1873)
- A number of figures commissioned for the centenary of Sir Walter Scott's birth (1871) added to the Scott Monument in 1874
- Bust of John Boyd Baxter, Procurator Fiscal and benefactor of the University of Dundee – Dundee Sheriff Court (1874)
- Moquette for statue of David Livingstone to stand in George Square Glasgow for a competition. This model is now within the David Livingstone Museum at High Blantyre (1875).
- Bust of Dr Thomas Guthrie for Inverary Manse, Argyll (1875)
- The carving of the "Moffat Ram" on the William Colvin Drinking Fountain, Moffat (1875).
- Monument to Dr Thomas Guthrie, St. John's Church, Princes St, Edinburgh (1875)
- Figures of "The Nobility" and a bronze relief scene from the Great Exhibition on the Prince Albert Memorial in Charlotte Square, Edinburgh (1876) (main figure by Sir John Steell commissioned in 1865, unveiled in 1876).
- Bust of Sir James Young Simpson Edinburgh (1877)
- Bust of Dr Crawford, University of Edinburgh (1877)
- Statue of Sir David Brewster Edinburgh (1877)
- Statue of Sir James Young Simpson on Princes Street Edinburgh (1877)
- Bust of Robert Bryson, Master of the Merchant Hall in Edinburgh, 1875 to 1877
- Bust of Thomas Carlyle Scottish National Portrait Gallery (1879)
- Bust of Henry Irving (exhibited at Royal Academy 1879)
- Bronze head of Samuel Bough on his gravestone in Dean Cemetery (1879)
- Bust of Sir James Young Simpson, Westminster Abbey (1879). Young declined burial in Westminster Abbey choosing to be buried closer to home in Warriston Cemetery, Edinburgh (now derelict).
- Bust of David Livingstone privately owned by Livingstone-Bruce family (1879)
- Bust of Ellen Terry (exhibited in Royal Academy 1880)
- Bust of William Nelson, Scottish National Portrait Gallery (1880)
- Statue of George Brown in Toronto Canada (1880)
- Large monument to John Hill Burton and his family, Dean Cemetery (1881) (commissioned by Burton during his lifetime)
- The figure of Amy Robsart (who appears in Scott's Kenilworth) as part of the final phase of statuary on the Scott Monument in 1882.
- Statuary group "The Genius of Architecture crowning the Theory and Practice of Art" now in Princes Street Gardens but originally in Sir James Gowans house on Napier Road in Merchiston, Edinburgh ("Rockville") now demolished. Date unknown. Probably built with the house, possibly as a wedding present to Gowans as his son-in-law (see above).
- Bust of James Nelson, Glasgow Art Gallery (date unknown)
- Bust of Professor John Stuart Blackie, Scottish National Portrait Gallery (date unknown)
- Bust of Robert Herdman, Scottish National Portrait Gallery (date unknown)
- Statue of Corinna, the Lyric Muse (date unknown)
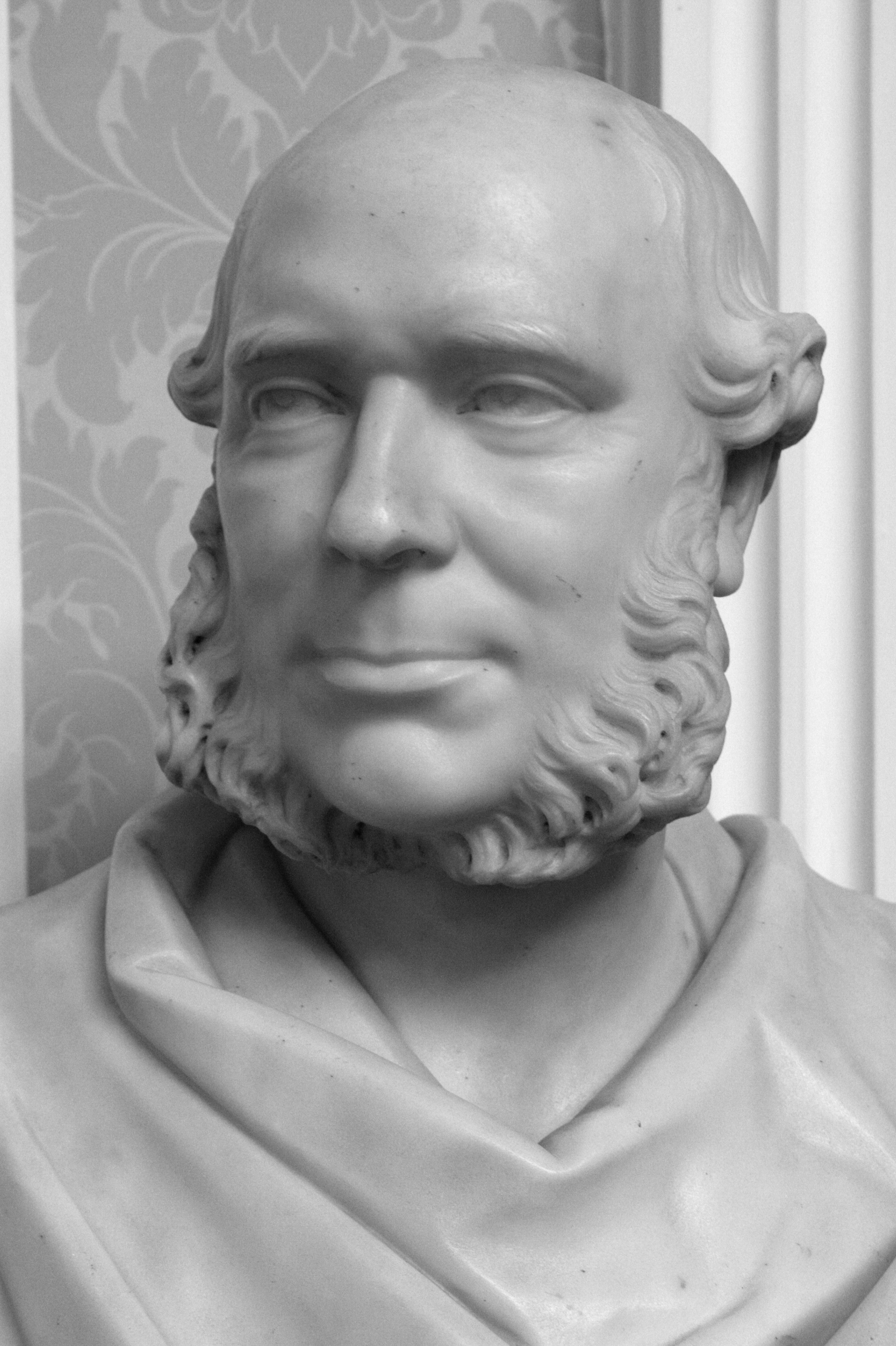
Robert Bryson, 1878

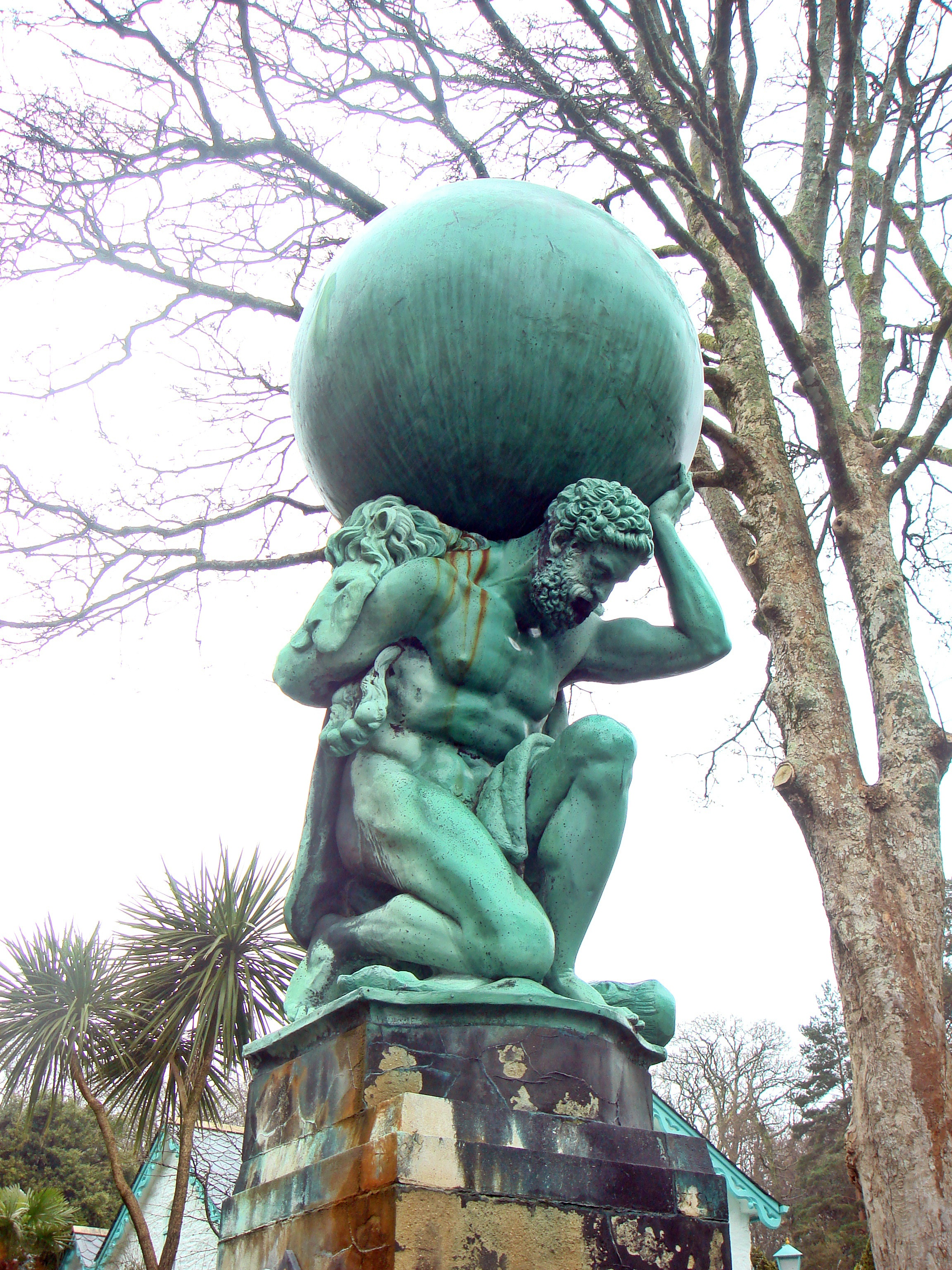
Hercules, a bronze statue in Portmeirion

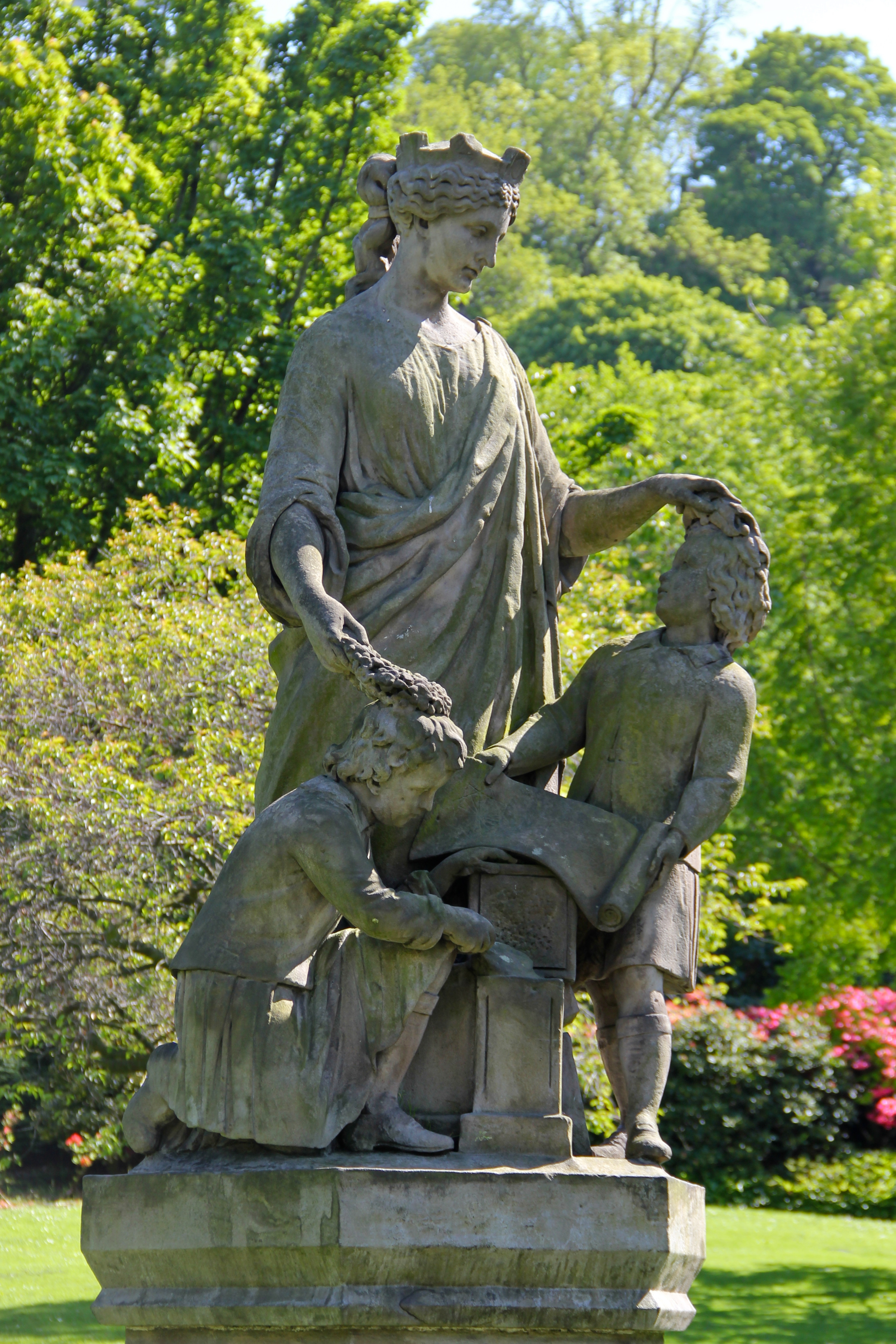
The Genius Of Architecture Rewarding At Once The Science And The Practice Of The Art in Edinburgh

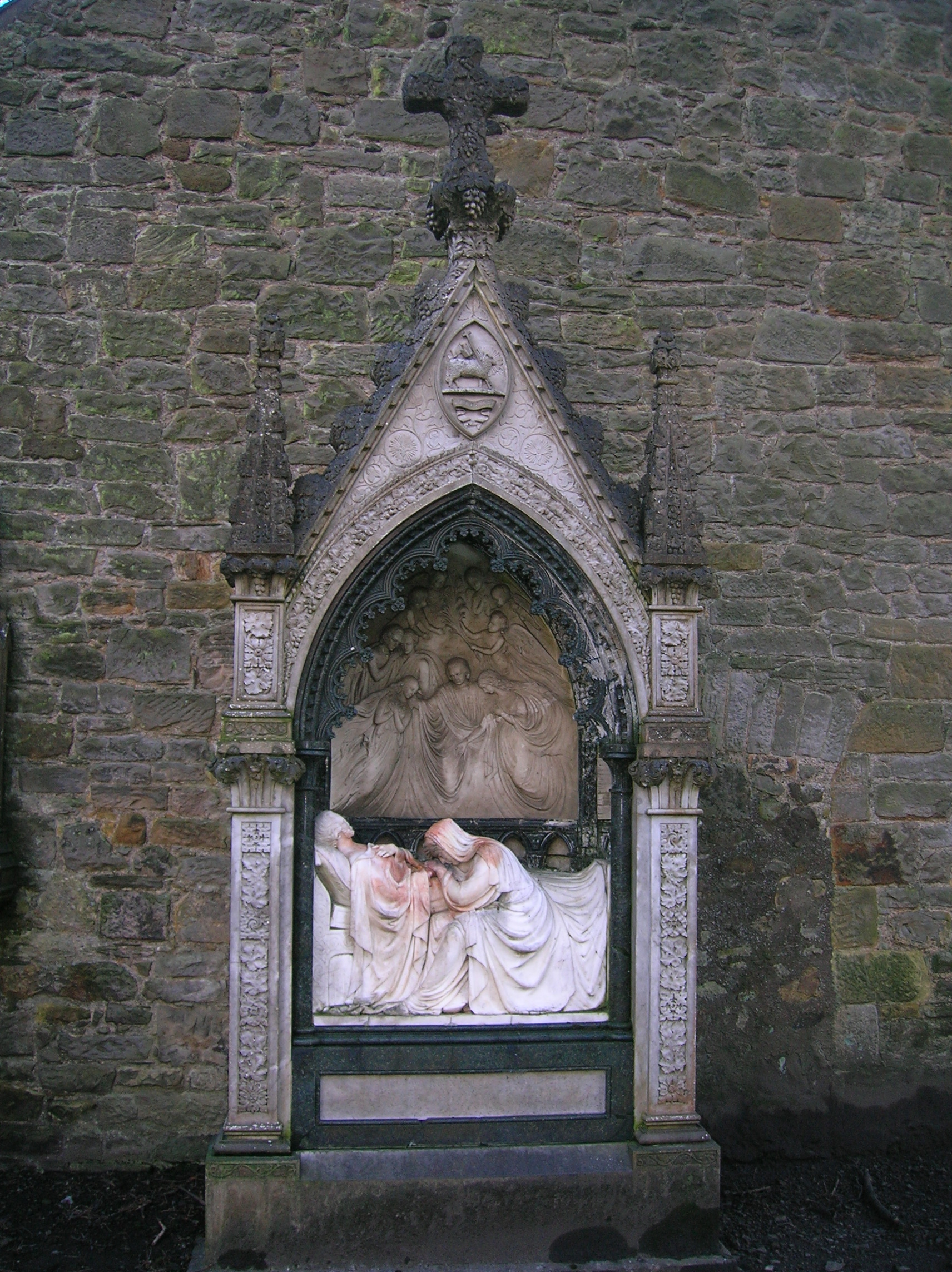
The John Spier memorial, now at Beith Auld Kirk.

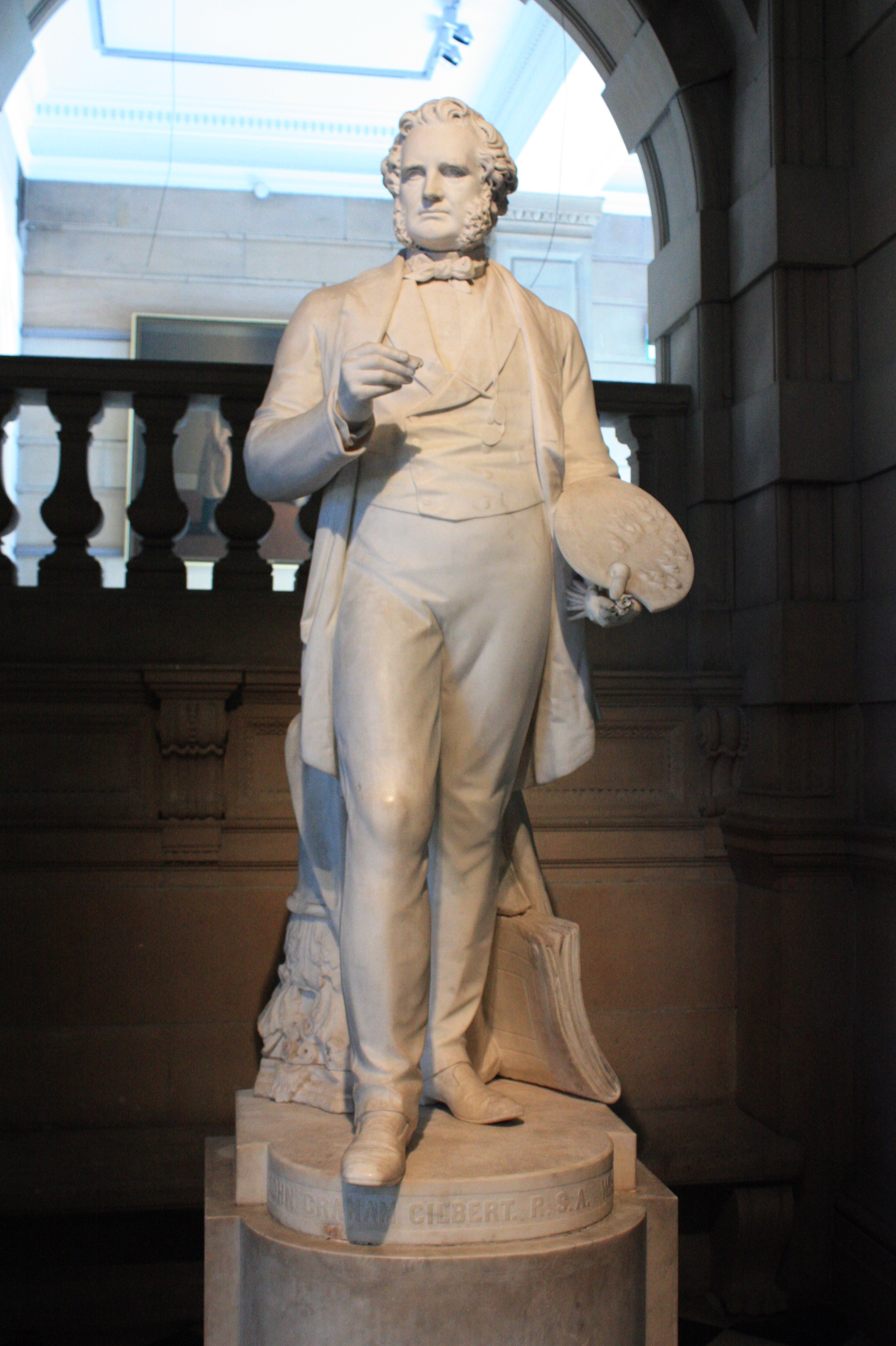
John Graham-Gilbert, Kelvingrove Art Gallery and Museum

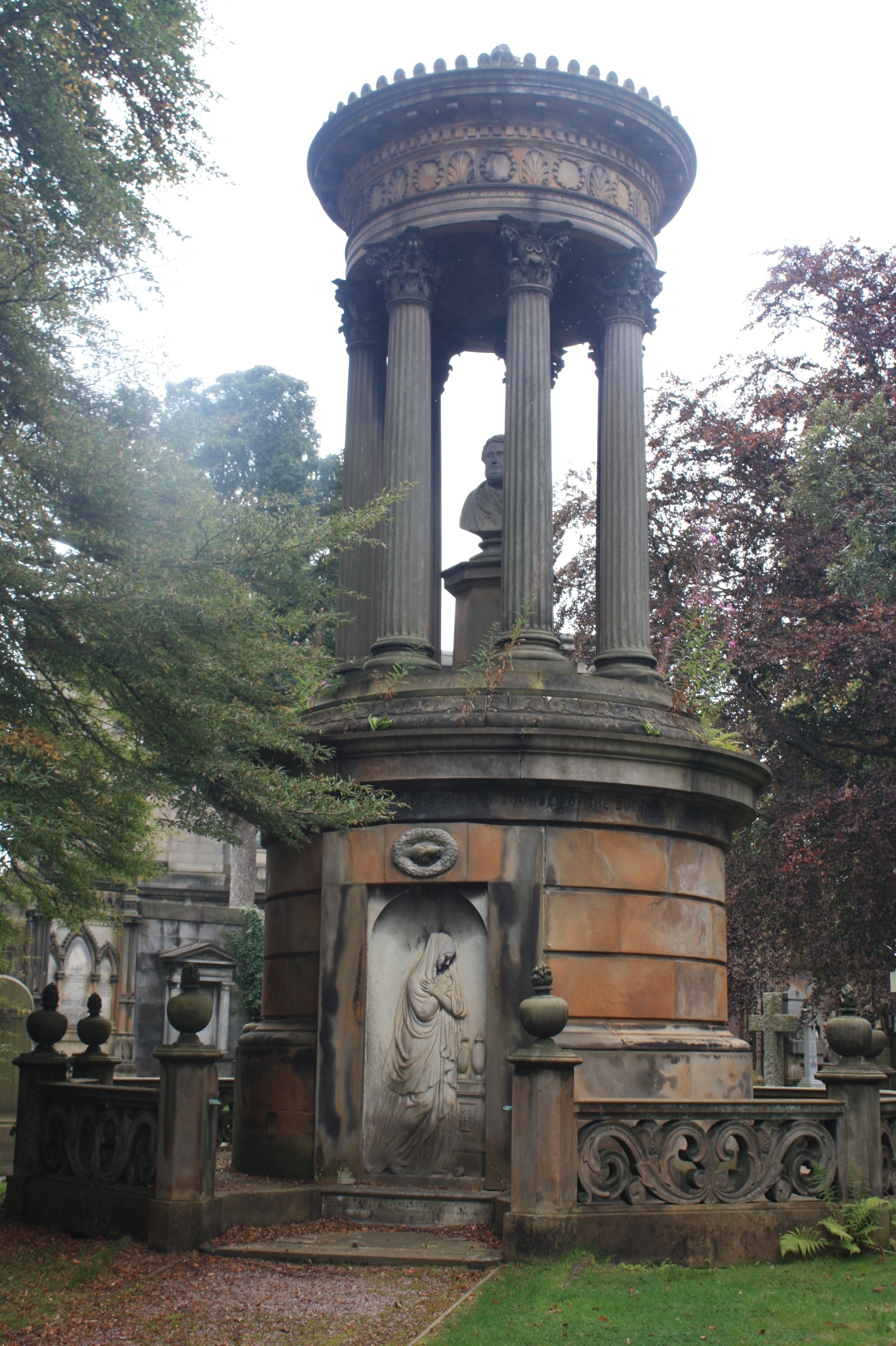
Buchanan Memorial, Dean Cemetery (Brodie's largest work)

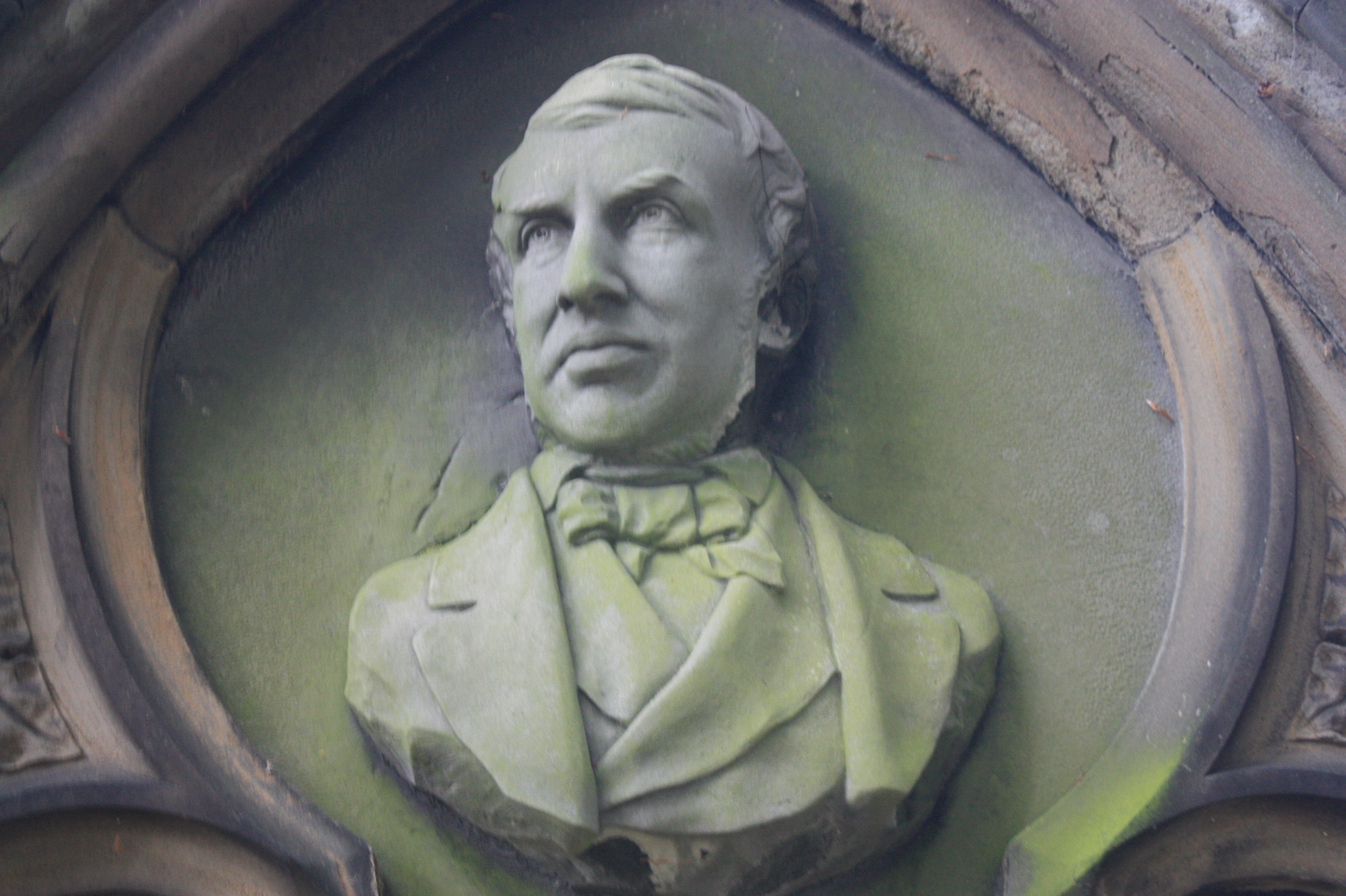
John Hill Burton on his wife's grave in Dean Cemetery, 1881

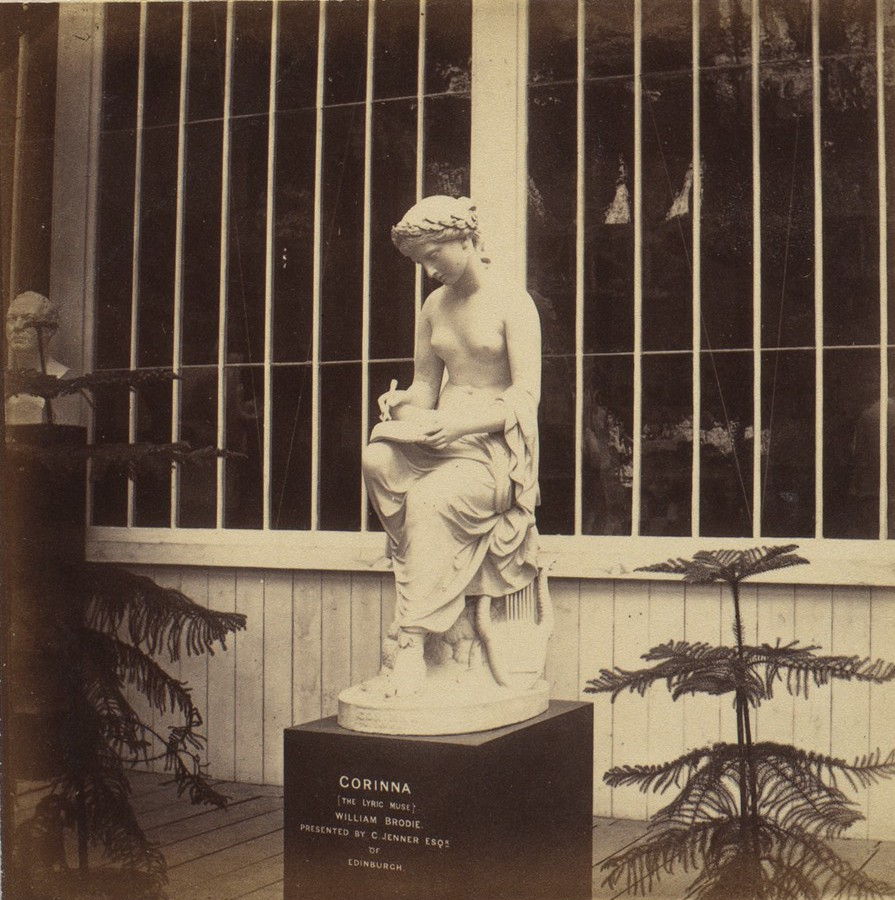
Corinna, a 1859 photo
