= Laurence Naismith =

English actor (1908–1992)

- As Argus in Jason and the Argonauts (1963)
- Born: Lawrence Johnson; 14 December 1908; Thames Ditton, Surrey, England
- Died: 5 June 1992 (aged 83); Southport, Queensland, Australia
- Occupation: Actor
- Years active: 1948–1982

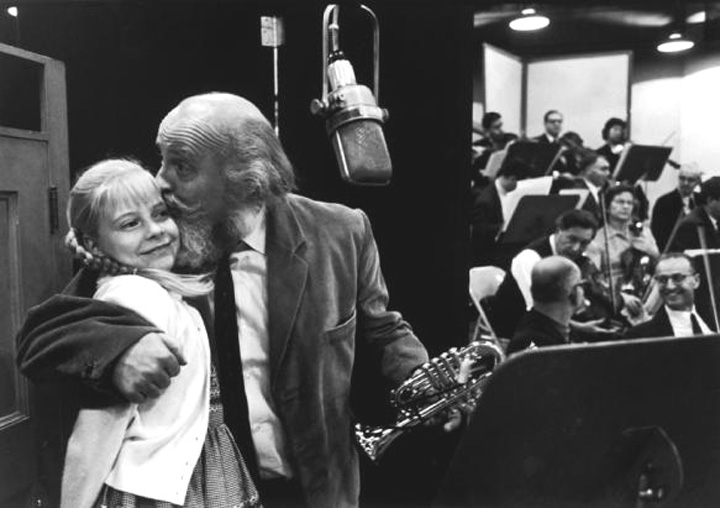
Kathy Cody and Laurence Naismith recording the cast album for Here's Love (1963)

Laurence Naismith (born Lawrence Johnson; 14 December 1908 – 5 June 1992) was an English actor. He made numerous film and television appearances, including starring roles in the musical films Scrooge (1970) and the children's ghost film The Amazing Mr. Blunden (1972). He also had memorable roles as Captain Edward Smith of the RMS Titanic in A Night to Remember (1958), the First Sea Lord in Sink the Bismarck! (1960), and Argus in Jason and the Argonauts (1963).

== Early life and career ==
Naismith was born as Lawrence Johnson on 14 December 1908 in Thames Ditton, Surrey. He attended All Saints Choir School, Margaret Street, London, and was a chorus member for a 1927 production of the George Gershwin musical Oh, Kay!. He later worked in repertory theatre and ran a repertory company of his own. Naismith served in the British Merchant Navy and at the outbreak of the Second World War, he joined the British Army where he became an officer in the Royal Artillery.

== Film ==
His film roles included Carrington V.C. (1954), Richard III (1955), The Man Who Never Was (1956), A Night to Remember (1958), Sink the Bismarck! (1960), The World of Suzie Wong (1960) and Jason and the Argonauts (1963). He played the non-singing role of Merlin in the 1967 film version of the musical Camelot and appeared in the James Bond film Diamonds Are Forever (1971) as the chairman of the diamond trading syndicate.

== Television ==
In 1965, Naismith played the title role of the Virginia statesman George Mason in the NBC documentary series, Profiles in Courage. William Bakewell played George Wythe in the episode, and Arthur Franz was cast as James Madison. In 1965, Naismith guest-starred as barber Gilly Bright in episode 25, "The Threat" of the ABC military drama, 12 O'Clock High and Dr. McCallister in the ABC action drama, The Fugitive, starring David Janssen. In 1969 he played Don Q Hought in an episode of Bonanza. He played Judge Fulton in the television series The Persuaders! (1971), with Tony Curtis and Roger Moore. He portrayed Emperor of Austria Franz Joseph in the BBC production Fall of Eagles (1974). Naismith played the Prince of Verona in the BBC Television Shakespeare version of Romeo and Juliet. He also appeared in the BBC sitcom Oh, Father! (1972) and played in The Invaders (1967–68) with Roy Thinnes.

== Stage ==
In 1934, he appeared alongside Jack Buchanan in the musical Mr. Whittington in London's West End. In 1952 he appeared at the Vaudeville Theatre in Sweet Madness by Peter Jones. On Broadway he performed in the Meredith Willson musical Here's Love in 1963, with Janis Paige.

== Filmography ==
- A Piece of Cake (1948) as Merlin Mound
- Trouble in the Air (1948) as Tom Hunt
- Badger's Green (1949) as Mr. Butler
- Kind Hearts and Coronets (1949) as Warder in Jail (uncredited)
- Train of Events (1949) as Joe Hunt (segment "The Actor")
- The Chiltern Hundreds (1949) as Reporter (uncredited)
- Room to Let (1950) as Editor
- The Happiest Days of Your Life (1950) as Dr. Collet
- Pool of London (1951) as Commissionaire (uncredited)
- Hell Is Sold Out (1951) as Dr. Monceau
- There Is Another Sun (1951) as Riley
- Chelsea Story (1951) as Sergeant Matthews
- Calling Bulldog Drummond (1951) as Hardcastle, Card Player (uncredited)
- High Treason (1951) as Reginald Gordon-Wells
- His Excellency (1952) as First Soldier
- Whispering Smith Hits London (1952) as Parker
- The Happy Family (1952) as Councillor
- I Believe in You (1952) as Sergeant Braxton
- Mother Riley Meets the Vampire (1952) as Police Sergeant at Desk (uncredited)
- Penny Princess (1952) as Louis the Jailkeeper (uncredited)
- A Killer Walks (1952) as Doctor James
- The Long Memory (1952) as Hasbury
- Cosh Boy (1953) as Inspector Donaldson
- Time Bomb (1953) as Ambulance Man (uncredited)
- Rough Shoot (1953) as Blossom
- The Beggar's Opera (1953) as Matt of the Mint
- Mogambo (1953) as Skipper
- Love in Pawn (1953) as Uncle Ramos
- The Million Pound Note (1954) as Walter Craddock (uncredited)
- The Black Knight (1954) as Major Domo
- Carrington V.C. (1954) as Major Panton
- The Dam Busters (1955) as Farmer
- Josephine and Men (1955) as Porter
- Richard III (1955) as The Lord Stanley
- The Man Who Never Was (1956) as Adm. Cross
- The Weapon (1956) as Jamison
- Lust for Life (1956) as Dr. Bosman
- Tiger in the Smoke (1956) as Canon Avril
- The Extra Day (1956) as Kurt Vorn
- The Barretts of Wimpole Street (1957) as Dr. Chambers
- Seven Waves Away (1957) as Captain Paul Darrow
- Boy on a Dolphin (1957) as Dr. Hawkins
- Robbery Under Arms (1957) as Ben Marston
- The Gypsy and the Gentleman (1958) as Dr. Forrester
- I Accuse! (1958) as Judge, Esterhazy Trial
- Gideon's Day (1958) as Arthur Sayer
- A Night to Remember (1958) as Capt. Edward John Smith
- The Two-Headed Spy (1958) as Gen. Hauser
- Tempest (1958) as Maj. Zurin
- Solomon and Sheba (1959) as Hezrai
- Third Man on the Mountain (1959) as Teo Zurbriggen
- Sink the Bismarck! (1960) as First Sea Lord
- The Angry Silence (1960) as Martindale
- The Trials of Oscar Wilde (1960) as Prince of Wales
- Village of the Damned (1960) as Doctor Willers
- The Criminal (1960) as Mr. Town
- The World of Suzie Wong (1960) as O'Neill
- The Singer Not the Song (1961) as Old Uncle
- Greyfriars Bobby (1961) as Mr. Traill
- The Valiant (1962) as Admiral
- I Thank a Fool (1962) as O'Grady
- The 300 Spartans (1962) as First Delegate
- We Joined the Navy (1962) as Admiral Blake
- Cleopatra (1963) as Arachesilaus (uncredited)
- Jason and the Argonauts (1963) as Argus
- The Three Lives of Thomasina (1963) as Reverend Angus Peddie
- Sky West and Crooked (1965) as Edwin Dacres
- Deadlier Than the Male (1967) as Sir John Bledlow
- Camelot (1967) as Merlyn
- The Scorpio Letters (1967) as Burr
- The Long Duel (1967) as McDougal
- Fitzwilly (1967) as Mr. Cotty (uncredited)
- Eye of the Cat (1969) as Dr. Mills
- The Valley of Gwangi (1969) as Professor Bromley
- The Bushbaby (1969) as Prof. 'Cranky' Crankshaw
- Run a Crooked Mile (1969) as Lord Dunnsfield
- Scrooge (1970) as Mr. Fezziwig
- Quest for Love (1971) as Sir Henry Larnstein
- Diamonds Are Forever (1971) as Sir Donald Munger
- Young Winston (1972) as Lord Salisbury
- The Amazing Mr. Blunden (1972) as Mr. Blunden

=== Television ===
- The Adventures of Robin Hood (1956) as Sir William de Courcier
- Danger Man (1960) as Spooner
- The Prince and the Pauper (1962) as Earl of Hertford
- Profiles in Courage (1965) as John Quincy Adams/George Mason
- The Fugitive (1965–1967) as Major Fielding/Dr. Andrew Emmett McAllister/John Mallory
- The Invaders (1967) as Professor Curtis Lindstrom/Cyrus Stone
- Bonanza (1969) as Don Q. Hought
- The Persuaders! (1971) as Judge Fulton
- Fall of Eagles (1974) as Emperor Franz Josef
- Romeo and Juliet (1978) as Prince Escalus
- I Remember Nelson (1982) as Rev. Edmund Nelson
