= Eleanor Stackhouse Atkinson =

American novelist (1863–1942)

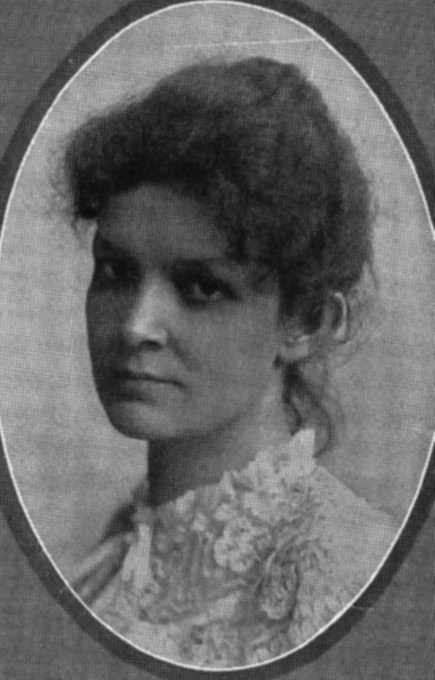
- Atkinson in The New Student's Reference Work
- Born: Eleanor Stackhouse; January 7, 1863; Rensselaer, Indiana, United States
- Died: November 4, 1942 (aged 79)
- Occupations: Author, journalist, teacher
- Spouse: Francis Blake Atkinson (m. 1890)
- Children: two daughters: Dorothy, Frances
- Writing career
- Pen name: Nora Marks
- Notable work: Greyfriars Bobby (1912 novel)

Eleanor Stackhouse Atkinson (January 7, 1863 – November 4, 1942) was an American writer, journalist and teacher.

== Marriage ==
Born Eleanor Stackhouse in Rensselaer, Indiana, she later married Francis Blake Atkinson, also an author. The couple had two daughters, Dorothy Blake (b. 1892) and Frances Eleanor (b. 1899).

== Career ==
She taught in schools in both Indianapolis and Chicago. She wrote for the Chicago Tribune as a stunt girl reporter under the pseudonym "Nora Marks" from 1888 to 1890, and later became publisher of the Little Chronicle Publishing Company, Chicago; this published several of her own works, along with other educational books and the Little Chronicle, an illustrated newspaper intended for young children.

While she wrote both fiction and non-fiction, the former mostly romances and the latter mostly educational books, she is best known for her novel Greyfriars Bobby, first published in 1912 (U.S.) and 1913 (U.K.). This popular work recounted the famous story of the eponymous dog; her version became one of the most influential retellings of the story. Many details of the book, especially those concerning the dog's master, differ from the historical record.; until recently it was assumed that she had no opportunity for original research of her setting. It seems likely that she worked from the basic story and embellished it from her own imagination. The story, however, is lovingly detailed; the descriptions of the geography may be somewhat confused, but effort was clearly made to get names correct, and to get across the atmosphere of the city. Despite having no known connection to Scotland, she attempted to reproduce the local dialect, which has been regarded by some commentators as convincing and strongly phrased; this suggests it is possible she picked up the story directly from Scottish immigrants to the Midwest.

"I wullna gang to the infairmary. It's juist for puir toon bodies that are aye ailin' an' deein'." Fright and resentment lent the silent old man an astonishing eloquence for the moment. "Ye wadna gang to the infairmary yer ainsel', an' tak' charity."

The book is often considered a classic, especially for children, and has been reprinted several times; it was the basis for the films Challenge to Lassie (MGM, 1949) and Greyfriars Bobby (Disney, 1961), although both of these postdated her death. Both films starred Donald Crisp.

== Personal life ==
Blake's daughter, Eleanor Blake, wrote a detective novel, Death Down East (1942). Her son, Atkinson's grandson, was the movie and television actor Wally Cox. Her husband Francis Atkinson was a fellow newspaperman and opened The Little Chronicle Publishing Company with her.

== Selected works ==
- Mamzelle Fifine : A Romance of the Girlhood of the Empress Josephine on the Island of Martinique (1903)
- Boyhood of Lincoln (1908) (also published as Lincoln's Love Story)
- Story of Chicago and National Development, 1534-1910. (1910)
- New Student's Reference Work for Teachers, Students and Families (1911)
- Greyfriar's Bobby (1912)
- Loyal Love (1912)
- Johnny Appleseed: The Romance of the Sower (1915)
- Pictured Knowledge; Visual Instruction Practically Applied for the Home and School (1916)
- Hearts Undaunted : A Romance of Four Frontiers (1917)
- "Poilu," a Dog of Roubaix. (1918)
