= Skye Terrier =

British breed of dog

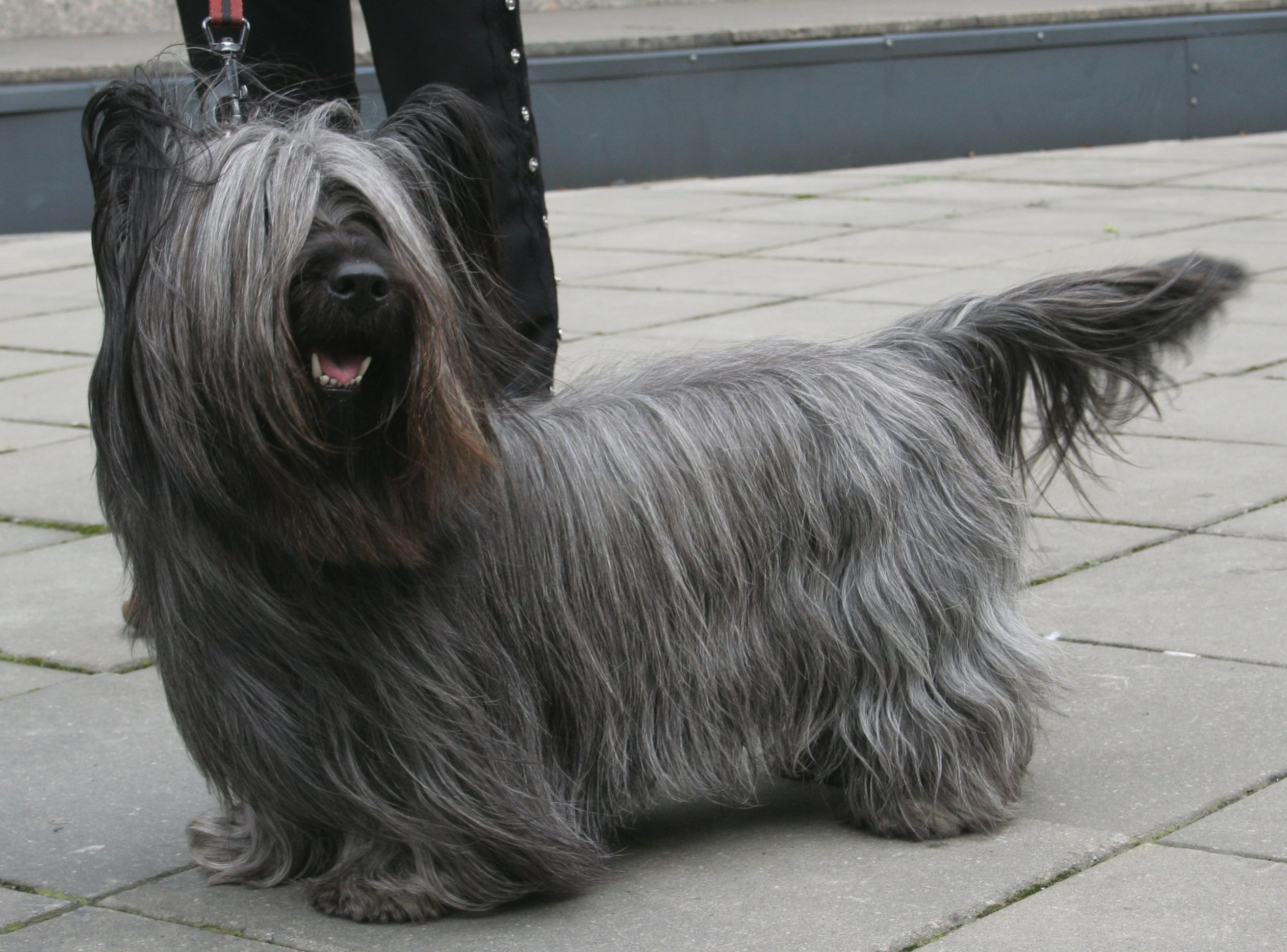
- Other names: Scotch Terrier
- Origin: Scotland
Traits
- Weight: 12–18 kg (26–40 lb)
Kennel club standards
- The Kennel Club: standard
- Fédération Cynologique Internationale: standard

The Skye Terrier is a Scottish breed of terrier. It is long, low, hardy and short-legged, and in the twenty-first century is among the most endangered breeds of the United Kingdom.

== History ==
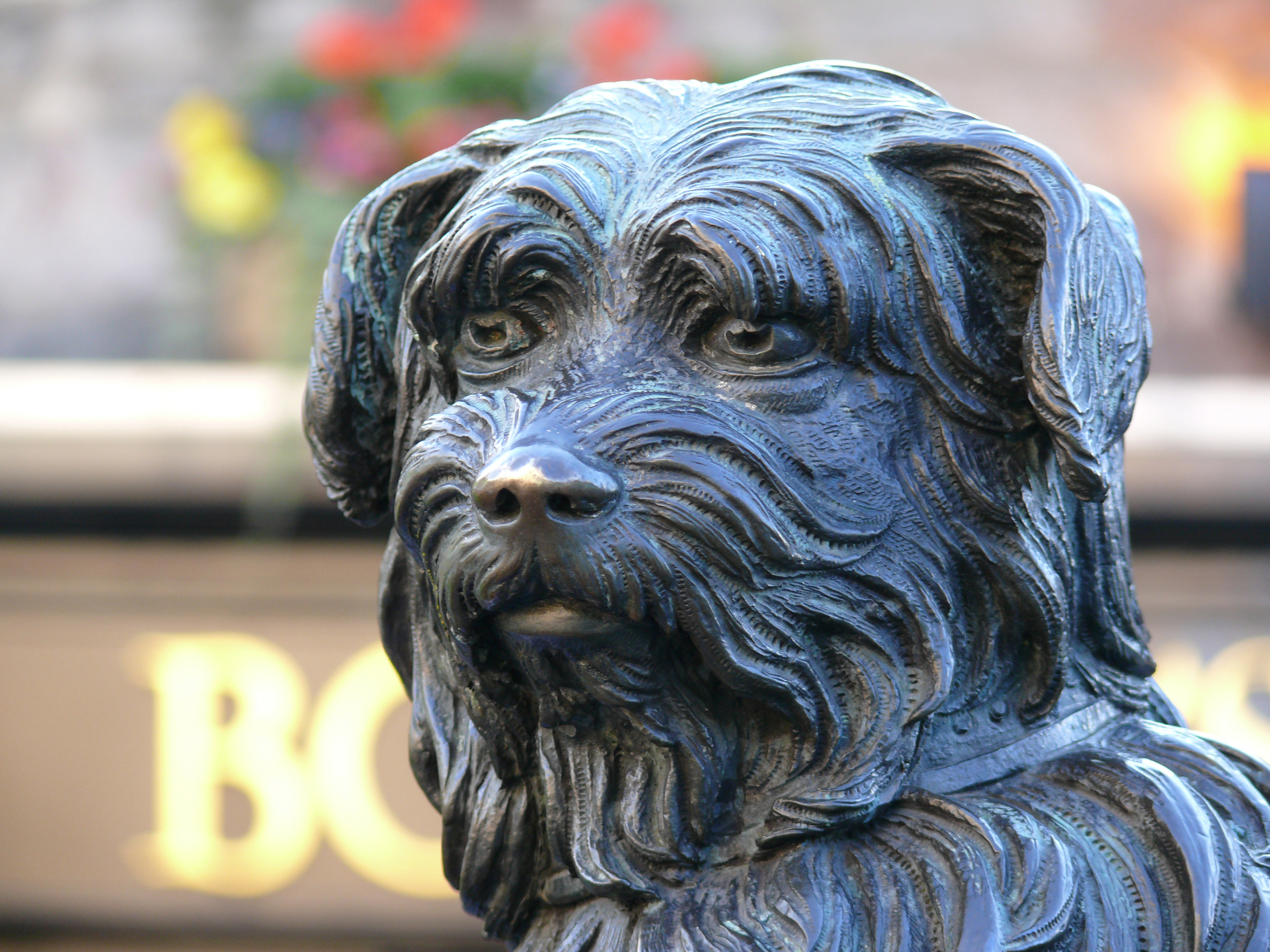
A statue of Greyfriars Bobby, a famously loyal Skye Terrier

A colour lithograph of Skye Terriers was included in The Illustrated Book of the Dog by Vero Shaw in 1881.

== Under threat ==
There are concerns that the breed is under threat of extinction with only 30 born in the UK in 2005. It is today one of the most endangered of the Vulnerable Native Breeds of that country. The breed may disappear completely within 40 years.

== Appearance ==
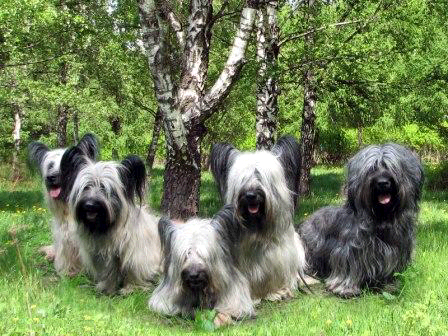

=== Coat ===
The Skye is double coated with a short, soft undercoat and a hard, straight topcoat. The shorter hair of the head veils the forehead and eyes, forming a moderate beard. The ears are generally well feathered and, in prick-eared examples, the hair normally falls like a fringe, accenting the form, and blending with the side locks.

=== Colour ===
Fawn, dark or light silver-grey, and cream are the standard colours. Regardless of colour all Skye terriers should have black points on their ears. muzzle and nose. There is generally no further patterning on the body, but a small white spot on the chest is relatively common.

=== Types ===
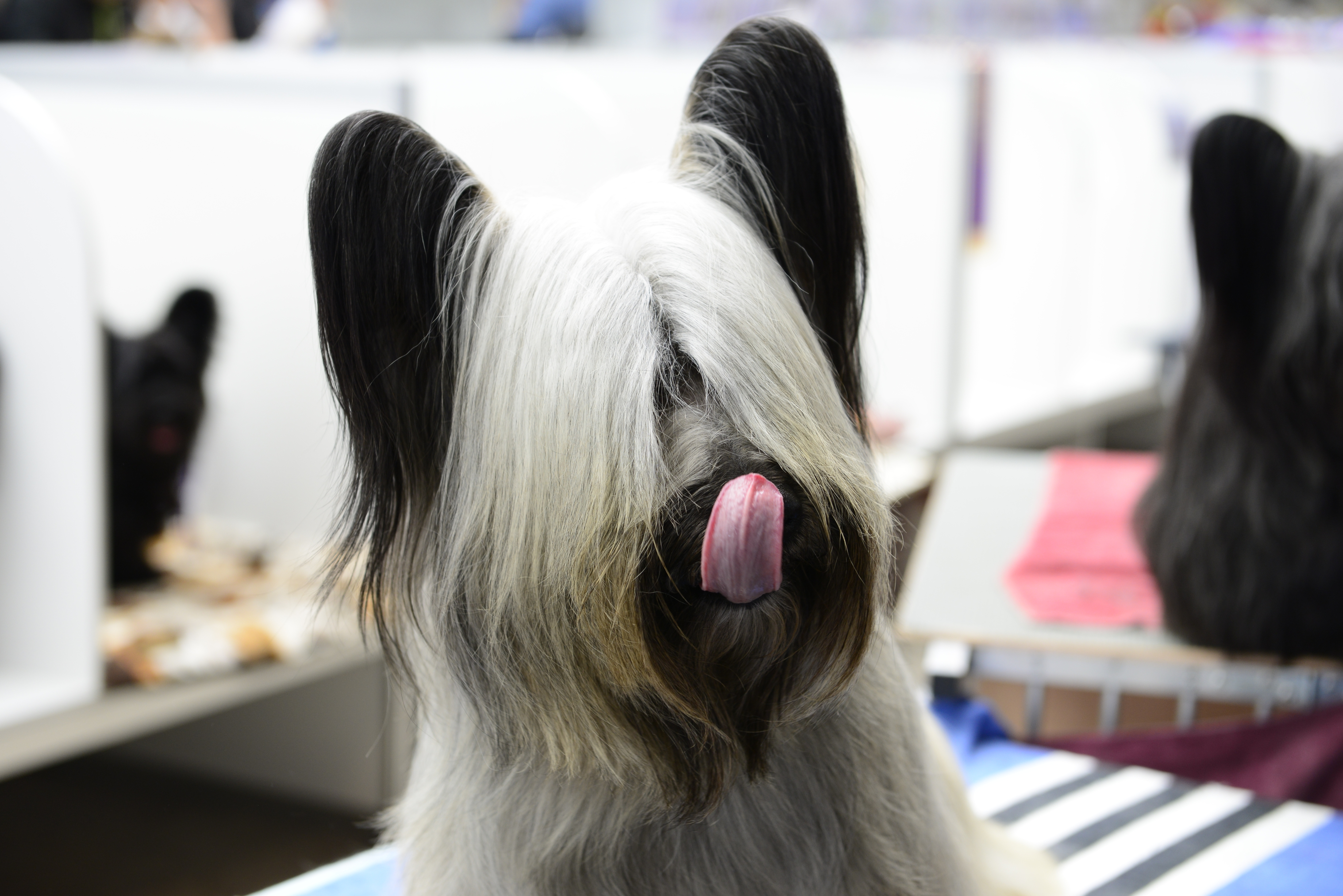
The light grey coat

Except for the shape and size of the ears, there is no significant difference nor preference given between the prick- and drop-eared types. When prick, they are medium-sized, carried high on the skull and angled slightly outwards.

== Health ==
In 1998, 'Skye terrier hepatitis' was described from biopsies of the livers of nine related Skye Terriers. This condition is not known in any other breed and the aetiology is unknown. It causes severe liver disease with scar tissue formation that may progress to cirrhosis. Researchers with the Cambridge University Department of Veterinary Medicine found that the condition is not actually a form of hepatitis. Prognosis varies between dogs and no gene has been identified as causing the condition nor has any heritability been properly demonstrated.

A 2024 UK study found a life expectancy of 12.4 years from a sample of 39 deaths for the breed compared to an average of 12.7 for purebreeds and 12 for crossbreeds.
