= Daniel Boyle (writer) =

Scottish screenwriter

Daniel Boyle is a Scottish screenwriter best known for devising the television series Hamish Macbeth and writing twelve episodes of the show.

Boyle left school at fifteen and for the next eleven years worked as a seaman. He left the sea and became a postman for four years before going to university as a mature student. After university his main occupation was as a college lecturer. He became a full-time writer in 1990, writing extensively for television, had four original films produced, and contributed episodes to series Inspector Morse, Rebus, Hamish Macbeth, Taggart and Lewis.

Boyle is married and has three children and four grandchildren.

== Screenplays ==
Screenplays written by Daniel Boyle
Date first broadcast	Title	Director	Cast	Synopsis Awards	Station Series
26 August 1988	Playing for Real: Episode 5	Jim Hill	Patricia Kerrigan, Alec Heggie, Jake D'Arcy, Iain Andrew, David Meldrum, Lawrie McNicol, Sandy Welch, Anne Kristen, Juliet Cadzow, Grace Glover, Libby McArthur, Barbara Rafferty, Johnny Irving, Nancy Mitchell, Paul Young, Ian Sexon, Tony Caunter, Frederick Warder, Robert Lang, Roger Lloyd Pack, Richard Howard, Robert Howie, Mike Grady, Jo McStay, Gavin Brown, Martin Heller and Rita Adam	The fate of the clubhouse is to be decided. Whose side is Suzy Gilbert-Walker on? Real Falkirk are drawn against the Chelsea Challengers, a team of actors led by the existentialist Jean-Paul Witherspoon, a man who doesn't conform to any tactical pattern. Mo goes to confession.	BBC1
5 February 1989	Leaving	Sandy Johnson	Kenneth McFadyen, Gary Greer, Alan Summers, Alex Norton, Paul Young, Gerry Slevin, Hugh Ross, Sean Scanlan, Paul Hannaway, Marcus Railton, Maggie Bell, Gerard Kelly, Caroline Paterson, Lorraine Brett, Adrian May, Andrew Goodfellow, Tony MacBeath, Alex McCrindle, Johnny Irving, Hugh Martin, Alastair Cording, Romilly Squire, Monica Brady, Craig Curran, Anthony McHale, Quentin Sommerville, James Maitland, Alan Kirk, Wyli McDonald and John Gordon	Greenock, 1960: Nick, Gus and Jada are in their last weeks at school, aware that the decisions they make now will be crucial to their future.	BBC2 Screen Two
21 March 1989	A View of Harry Clark	Alister Reid	Griff Rhys Jones, Elaine Paige, Laura Claire Duerden, Benjie Lawrence, Charlotte Coleman, Adrian Murphy, Ian Hart, Jake D'Arcy, Mary Ann Reid, Louis Emerick, James Culshaw, Al T Kossy, Mitzi Meuller, Sandra Gough, Iain McColl, Ian Sexon, Grace Kirby and Jill Balcon	Harry Clark is a social worker on the verge of cracking up. His job is to help other people: who is there to help him?	BBC1 The Play on One
20 February 1991	Inspector Morse: Second Time Around	Adrian Shergold	John Thaw, Kevin Whately, Kenneth Colley, Pat Heywood, Ann Bell, Oliver Ford Davies, James Grout, Christopher Eccleston, Adie Allen, Sam Kelly, Jenny Laird, Maurice Bush, Mark Draper, Simon Adams, Peter Warrington, Liz Kettle, David Bauckham, Claude le Sache, Pamela Stirling, Shahnaz Pakravan, Robert Goodale, Helena McCarthy, Graeme du Fresne, Matthew Green, Neale McGrath, Peter Gordon, Simon Coady and Russell Kilmister	A highly thought-of and distinguished senior officer, Charlie Hillian, has just retired and is writing a book about his biggest cases. During the night after he received an OBE, Hillian is killed in a struggle in his rural Oxfordshire home. The notes for one chapter of his forthcoming book are missing, the only case in the book which Hillian and his then DS, Patrick Dawson, never solved. That case involved the murder of an eight-year-old girl, Mary Lapsley, and it appears that someone wants that chapter to be unpublished.	Zenith Productions for Central ITV
26 February 1992	Inspector Morse: Dead on Time	John Madden	John Thaw and Kevin Whately	When Henry Fallon, an Oxford don, commits suicide, Morse discovers he has a painful link with the man's widow, Susan.	Zenith Productions for Central ITV
11 March 1992	Inspector Morse: Happy Families	Adrian Shergold	John Thaw and Kevin Whately	Morse becomes the victim of a hate campaign by the press as he investigates the death of a cruel, boorish industrialist.	Zenith Productions for Central ITV
6 January 1993	Inspector Morse: Deadly Slumber	Stuart Orme	John Thaw, Kevin Whately and Jason Durr	Matthew Brewster, owner of a private clinic, is found dead in his garage with the car engine running.	Zenith Productions for Central ITV
13 January 1993	Inspector Morse: The Day of the Devil	Stephen Whittaker	John Thaw, Kevin Whately and Keith Allen	John Peter Barrie, a convicted rapist and devil worshipper, escapes from a prison infirmary by eluding the authorities with several disguises.	Zenith Productions for Central ITV
25 September 1994	Meat	John Madden	Jonny Lee Miller, Sarah-Jane Potts, Peter Wight, John Simm, Laurence Kavanagh, Sarah Carpenter, Trevor Peacock, Robert Hamilton, Bill Cashmore, Louise Heaney, Graham Fletecher-Cook and Dennis Blanch	On his release from a young offenders' institution, Charlie Dyce's single-mindedness makes him both friends and enemies when he eventually finds work in a seedy London cafe. There he meets and falls for a teenage prostitute, Myra, whose love transforms his life and gives him back a sense of identity. But when she becomes pregnant with Charlie's baby, her jealous pimp Frank exacts his revenge, pushing Charlie's powers of endurance to the limit.	BBC1 Screen One
26 March 1995	Hamish Macbeth: The Great Lochdubh Salt Robbery	Nicholas Renton	Robert Carlyle, Ralph Riach, Jimmy Yuill, Stuart Davids, Valerie Gogan, Brian Pettifer, Anne Lacey, Duncan Duff, Barbara Rafferty, Stuart McGugan, Rab Christie, Bill Leadbitter, Greer Gaffney, David Ashton, Jon Croft, Julia Wallace, John Grieve, Kenny Ryan, Anne Lannan and Pip Torrens	Hamish has his hands full dealing with two cases – a salt theft from a local grocery store, and the disappearance of the local wife abuser, Geordie Robb.	BBC1
23 April 1995	Hamish Macbeth: Wee Jock's Lament	Nicholas Renton	Robert Carlyle, Ralph Riach, Ken Hutchinson, Billy McColl, Jimmy Yuill, Stuart Davids, Brian Pettifer, Duncan Duff, Patricia Ross, Graham De Banzie, Shirley Henderson, Anne Lacey, Stuart McGugan, Dolina MacLennan, Rab Christie, Michael Marra, Christine Primrose and Grieg Guthrie	Hamish tries to track down two escaped convicts whom he believes ran over and killed his dog Wee Jock. Suspecting this actions may result in murder, the townsfolk set out to find him before he reaches boiling point.	BBC1
24 March 1996	Hamish Macbeth: A Perfectly Simple Explanation	Nicholas Renton	Robert Carlyle, Philip Jackson, Brian Alexander, Juliet Cadzow, Ron Donachie, Shirley Henderson, Stuart McGugan, Barbara Rafferty, Valerie Gogan, Billy Riddoch, Stuart Davids, David Ashton, Ralph Riach, Laurie Ventry, Anne Lacey, Brian Pettifer, Duncan Duff, Rab Christie, Dolina MacLennan, Ronnie Letham and Iain McColl	Hamish is branded a devil by a religious group who claim that Lochdubh is the new Gomorrah. His initial disdain turns to concern for head of the Church of the Stony Path, Malachi MacBean, whose behaviour continues to become more erratic.	BBC1
14 April 1996	Hamish Macbeth: Radio Lochdubh	Nicholas Renton	Robert Carlyle, Brian Alexander, Stuart Davids, Shirley Henderson, Valerie Gogan, Stuart McGugan, Billy Riddoch, Duncan Duff, Barbara Rafferty, Ralph Riach, Ronnie Letham, Iain McColl, Peter Wight, Dinah Stabb, Brian Pettifer, Anne Lacey, Margery Withers and Hugo Munro	Hamish is ordered to close down a popular local pirate radio station by two radio detection officers, but faces backlash from the locals. Meanwhile, his personal life takes a turn from the worse when he breaks up with Alex, but his decision soon turns into tragedy.	BBC1
21 April 1996	Hamish Macbeth: No Man is an Island	Nicholas Renton	Robert Carlyle, Valerie Gogan, Edith MacArthur, Ralph Riach, Gerard Kelly, David Ashton, Shirley Henderson, Billy Riddoch, Stuart Davids, Stuart McGugan, Brian Pettifer, Anne Lacey, Duncan Duff, Barbara Rafferty, Michael MacKenzie and Iain Andrew	Hamish takes off to a remote island following Alex's death, but ends up having to rescue an elderly woman, Belle, who discovers the remains of an unexploded landmine. Meanwhile, Hamish's replacement, PC Duggan, begins to offend the locals.	BBC1
28 April 1996	Hamish Macbeth: The Lochdubh Deluxe	Nicholas Renton	Robert Carlyle, Andrew Keir, Jimmy Chisholm, Ida Shuster, Robert Carr, Anne Lacey, Brian Pettifer, Sheila Keith, David Ashton, Stuart Davids, Ralph Riach, Stuart McGugan, Barbara Rafferty, Billy Riddoch, Duncan Duff, Jake D'Arcy, Robert Ellis, Joe Greig, Laurie Ventry and Daniel Boyle	Hamish has to intervene in a family feud, and investigates the disappearance of a body from the local burial ground. Lachie Jr. is asked to become the new assistant to the undertaker, who has become tired of his nephew's behaviour.	BBC1
16 March 1997	Hamish Macbeth: The Honourable Policeman	Jonas Grimås	Robert Carlyle, David Ashton, Sally Dexter, Sharon Small, Mona Bruce, Ralph Riach, Duncan Duff, Stuart Davids, Stuart McGugan, Barbara Rafferty, Billy Riddoch, Brian Pettifer, Anne Lacey, Shirley Henderson, John Malcolm and Sheila Donald	Hamish is invited to be the best man at the local laird's wedding, but suspects the laird's fiancé may be harbouring an ulterior motive for wanting to marry. Meanwhile, Hamish is forced to train a new woman police constable, Anne Patterson.	BBC1
23 March 1997	Hamish Macbeth: Deferred Sentence	Nicholas Renton	Robert Carlyle, Alan MacNaughton, Tom Watson, Caroline Paterson, Ann-Louise Ross, Amanda Walker, Michael Byrne, Colette O'Neil and Daniel Boyle	Hamish investigates a twenty-year-old mystery which has divided the island of Laggan-Laggan, whilst trying to avoid becoming embroiled in the rivalry between Father McPhail and his adversary, Enoch McDuff.	BBC1
30 March 1997	Hamish Macbeth: The Lochdubh Assassin	Nicholas Renton	Robert Carlyle, Shirley Henderson, Ralph Riach, Stephen Henderson, Sandy McDade, Forbes Masson, Stewart Porter, James Ryland, David McKay, Stuart Davids, Billy Riddoch, Stuart McGugan, Barbara Rafferty, Anne Lacey, Brian Pettifer, David Ashton and Michael MacKenzie	Hamish must protect the village from a gang of ruthless villains who follow Isobel back from Glasgow, but he has a particularly difficult time keeping them under control – as they have yet to commit a crime.	BBC1
6 April 1997	Hamish Macbeth: The Good Thief	Jonas Grimås	Robert Carlyle, James Young, Stephen Henderson, Campbell Morrison, Tam Dean Burn, Stuart Davids, Ruaridh Hepburn, Anne Lacey, Ralph Riach, Sandy McDade, Billy Riddoch, Stuart McGugan, Brian Pettifer, Barbara Rafferty, Duncan Duff and Bill Murdoch	Hamish has to uncover the secret of Frankie's best friend from Glasgow, Tusker Gray, who threatens to ruin the annual singing contest between Lochdubh Stag Bar and the Dunbracken Arms.	BBC1
27 April 1997	Hamish Macbeth: Destiny (part 1)	Nicholas Renton	Robert Carlyle, Ralph Riach, Sean Scanlan, Kenny Ireland, Caroline Loncq, Brian Pettifer, David Ashton, Billy Riddoch, Stuart Davids, Stephen Henderson, Anne Lacey, Duncan Duff, Stuart McGugan, Barbara Rafferty, Shirley Henderson, Sandy McDade and Joe Greig	Hamish is forced to uncover the location of the Stone of Destiny after John's criminal brother, Kenneth McIver, is sprung from an American jail, and returns to Lochdubh in search of the priceless artifact.	BBC1
4 May 1997	Hamish Macbeth: Destiny (part 2)	Nicholas Renton	Robert Carlyle, Ralph Riach, Sean Scanlan, Caroline Loncq, Shirley Henderson, Brian Pettifer, David Ashton, Billy Riddoch, Stuart Davids, Duncan Duff, Stuart McGugan, Barbara Rafferty, Kenny Ireland, John Grieve, Brendan Conroy and Ray De-Haan	Hamish and friends trek across the mountains to rescue John after Ava and Kenneth manage to steal the Stone of Destiny. But while Hamish and Isobel's relationship begins to blossom, John's fate proves to be much darker.	BBC1
2 October 2001	Murder Rooms: Mysteries of the Real Sherlock Holmes: The White Knight Stratagem	Paul Marcus	Ian Richardson, Charles Edwards and Rik Mayall	Dr. Joseph Bell helps the police investigate the murder of a money lender; but old animosity between him and the officer in charge leads to conflict. Matters become worse when Doyle sees merit in the lieutenant's theories rather than in Bell's.	BBC One
27 December 2002	Bait	Nicholas Renton	John Hurt, Rachael Stirling and Sheila Hancock	When Jack Blake picks up a woman and her daughter, stranded when their car breaks down, he is struck by the daughter's resemblance to his own murdered child. Jack sees an opportunity to unwittingly involve both women in a scheme, in which he hopes will unmask his daughter's killer.	ITV
16 September 2005	Taggart: Cause and Effect	Patrick Harkins	Alex Norton	As uniform attend a report of a break in, they arrive to find an ex-copper hiding in the corner, and the battered body of an attractive woman lying on the floor. The investigation begins with the victim's husband, Dennis Pryde, but leads Burke into reuniting with an old colleague, Jack Anderson, who was jailed for five years for corruption.	STV
2 February 2006	Rebus: The Falls	Matthew Evans	Ken Stott	Rebus investigates the murder of a retired obstetrician, who is found dead in his home having been the victim of torture. A clue left at the scene by the killer leads Rebus to the local museum, and puts him onto the trail of a stalker targeting a university student.	STV
6 March 2006	Rebus: Fleshmarket Close	Matthew Evans	Ken Stott	Rebus investigates the death of a Kosovan national who is found dead in a seedy Edinburgh slum, but a racist slur left on the victim's head leads him into contact with a group of local gangland bosses, and it's not long before a second corpse is discovered.	STV
8 September 2006	Rebus: The Black Book	Roger Gartland	Ken Stott	Rebus finds himself drawn towards a cold case after a prostitute is buried alive beneath a famous Scottish landmark, but finds himself stonewalled when his prime suspect turns out to be a member of parliament – forcing his superiors to draft in a fellow DI to rein him in.	STV
18 February 2007	Lewis: Whom the Gods Would Destroy	Marc Jobst	Kevin Whately and Laurence Fox	DI Lewis and DS Hathaway investigate the murder of Dean Greely. As the investigation continues, they discover that Greely and three other men had formed a club during their Oxford student days, the Sons of the Twice Born. Today, the men have little contact with one another and initially deny that their club existed. When a second member of the foursome is murdered, it becomes apparent that they have a secret, from 30 years ago, and that someone is out for revenge.	ITV

Scripts currently seeking production:

- ‘Mary Dogood.’ Three part series for TV. Black comedy
- ‘Maurice, Lee, and JFK.’ Ten part series for TV plus second series on assassination of JFK and aftermath.
- ‘Loving Burns.’ Feature. Factional bio of the Scottish poet.
- ‘Illusion.’ Three part TV series featuring Glasgow based PI John Paris.
- ‘The Satan Gene.’ Feature. US based thriller.
- ‘Dancing At The Shore.’ Feature. Comedy set in West of Scotland 1960’s dance hall.
- ‘The Road From Ardcranna.’ Three part TV drama based on Highland Clearances.

== Books ==
- Mary Dogood ISBN 9781465865755
- Illusion ISBN 9781466179530
- The Road From Ardcranna ISBN 9780463771549
