= Adam Foundation Prize in Creative Writing =

International Institute of Modern Letters at Victoria University of Wellington Prize

The Adam Foundation Prize in Creative Writing was set up in 1996 by benefactors Denis and Verna Adam. It is awarded to an outstanding MA student at the International Institute of Modern Letters at Victoria University of Wellington.

== History ==
The Adam Foundation Prize in Creative Writing was set up in 1996 by Denis and Verna Adam (through the Victoria University Foundation), to further their wish of encouraging and supporting the development of creative writing in New Zealand.

Denis and Verna Adam were art collectors and philanthropists who established the Adam Foundation in 1975 to house their art collection and later to support the arts in general, believing that art “nurtures the finer instincts of human beings”. Denis Adam died in October 2018, aged 94.

In 2009, the Prize was awarded for the first time to a work of creative non-fiction and in 2014, a young adult novel, described by Mal Peet as “richly imagined, sinisterly futuristic and morally complex,” was the first of its genre to win the award.

== Eligibility and conditions ==
The prize is awarded annually to the author of the best page-based portfolio for the MA in creative writing in the International Institute of Modern Letters at Victoria University of Wellington.

It is awarded by the Academic Board on the recommendation of the Heads, School of English, Film and Theatre.

The prize carries a monetary value (currently $3000) which may vary subject to available funds.

== List of winners by year ==
- 1997: Catherine Chidgey. In a Fishbone Church (novel). Published by Victoria University Press (VUP), 1998. Also winner of the Best First Book of Fiction at the 1998 Montana Book Awards.
- 1998: William Brandt. Alpha Male (short fiction). Published by VUP, 1999, and subsequently published by Jonathan Cape. Also winner of the Best First Book of Fiction at the 1999 Montana Book Awards.
- 1999: No award made.
- 2000: Tim Corballis. Below (novel). Published by VUP, 2001.
- 2001: Paula Morris. Queen of Beauty (novel). Published by Penguin, 2002. Also winner of the Best First Book of Fiction at the 2003 Montana Book Awards.
- 2002: Cliff Fell. The Adulterer's Bible (poetry). Published by VUP, 2003. Also winner of the Best First Book of Poetry at the 2004 Montana Book Awards.
- 2003: Josh Greenberg. A Man who Eats the Heart (novel). Published by VUP, 2004.
- 2004: Emily Dobson. A Box of Bees (poetry). Published by VUP, 2005.
- 2005: Michele Amas. After the Dance (poetry). Published by VUP, 2006. Also shortlisted for Best First Book of Poetry at the 2007 Montana New Zealand Book Awards.
- 2006: Anna Taylor. Going Under: Stories (short story collection). Published as Relief by VUP, 2009.
- 2007: Eleanor Catton. The Rehearsal (novel). Published by VUP, 2008 and subsequently by Granta in the UK (2009) and Little Brown in the US (2010). Also winner of the NZSA Hubert Church Best First Book Award for Fiction at the 2009 Montana NZ Book Awards, and of the 2009 UK Society of Authors' Betty Trask Award.
- 2008: Lynn Jenner. Dear Sweet Harry (mixed genre). Published by Auckland University Press, 2010. Also winner of the Best First Book of Poetry in the 2011 New Zealand Post Book Awards.
- 2009: Ashleigh Young. Can You Tolerate This? (personal essays). Also winner of the Royal Society Te Apārangi Award for General Non-Fiction 2017 and the 2017 Windham Campbell Prize in Nonfiction.
- 2010: Rayne Cockburn. Someplace for Boys (novel).
- 2011: Hera Lindsay Bird. And Together We Fight Crime (prose poetry collection).
- 2012: Kerry Donovan Brown. Lamplighter (novel). Published by VUP, 2014.
- 2013: Helena Wiśniewska Brow. Give Us This Day: a memoir of family and exile. Published by VUP, 2014.
- 2014: Craig Gamble. The Watch List (young-adult novel).
- 2015: Nick Bollinger. Goneville (music memoir). Published by AWA Press, 2016.
- 2016: Annaleese Jochems. And Lower (novel). Published as Baby, VUP, 2017.
- 2017: Tayi Tibble. In a Fish Tank Filled with Pink Light (poetry collection). Published as Poūkahangatus, VUP, 2018. Also winner of the Best First Book of Poetry at the 2019 Ockham New Zealand Book Awards.
- 2018: Laura Southgate. The Boyfriend (novel). Published by VUP, 2019.
- 2019: Rebecca K Reilly. Vines (novel). Published as Greta & Valdin by VUP, 2021. Also winner of the Best First Book of Fiction at the 2022 Ockham New Zealand Book Awards.
- 2020: Kōtuku Titihuia Nuttall. Tauhou. Published by Te Herenga Waka University Press (THWUP), 2022.
- 2021: Sharron Came. Peninsula (novel). Published by THWUP, 2022.
- 2022: Olive Nuttall. Kitten (novel). Published by THWUP, 2024.
- 2023: Joseph Trinidad, Lucky Creatures (essay collection).
- 2024: Gilbert Ostini, Rockface (novel).
- 2025: Niamh Vaughan, The World Reversed (memoir).

== See also ==
- List of New Zealand literary awards
