= Heart of the High Country =

- Written by: Elizabeth Gowans
- Directed by: Sam Pillsbury
- Starring: Valerie Gogan; Frank Whitten; Kenneth Cranham
- Composer: John Charles
- Country of origin: New Zealand
- Original language: English
- No. of seasons: 1
- No. of episodes: 6

Production
- Producers: Lloyd Phillips; Rob Whitehouse
- Cinematography: James Bartle
- Editors: Ken Sparks; Patrick Monaghan
- Running time: 60 minutes

Original release
- Release: November 12 – December 17, 1985

Heart of the High Country is a 1985 New Zealand/England produced television series shot in New Zealand. It was written by English writer Elizabeth Gowans and starred Valerie Gogan in her first major role. It is about a British girl, Ceci, who in the 1870s travels to New Zealand for a new opportunity, spanning 20 years of her life. It first aired in Britain from November 1985 before screening in New Zealand from November 1986.

== Cast ==
- Valerie Gogan as Ceci
- Kenneth Cranham as Calvin Laird
- John Howard as Ginger
- David Letch as Jock Bowen
- Peter Bland as Billy
- Frank Whitten as Reg Bowen
- Bill Johnson as Old Bowen
- Marshall Napier as Harry
- Ross Duncan as Sam
- Michele Amas as Olwen
- Gordon Karpin as William
- Myra Dalziel as Annie

== Reception ==
Harry Rose in the Swindon Advertiser said he "was almost dumbfounded by the naive values of the production. I mean it was really corny!" Jim Schembri of the Age says "It is a singularly unusual and brave offering that, with a little effort, is very rewarding."
