= Duncan Duff =

Scottish actor (born 1964)

- Born: Edinburgh, Scotland
- Education: RADA
- Occupation: Actor
- Years active: 1987–present
- Spouse: Rosalie Robinson
- Children: 2

Duncan Duff (born in Edinburgh, Scotland) is a British stage, television and film actor who trained at the Royal Academy of Dramatic Art in London from 1985 to 1987. He is best known for A Quiet Passion (2016), Wild Target (2010), Big Kids (2000), and Hamish Macbeth (1997).

== Career ==
Duff made his professional stage debut in 1987 with the British theatre company Cheek by Jowl, founded by Declan Donnellan and Nick Ormerod, in a production of Macbeth at the Donmar Warehouse and on tour. He played the Thane of Angus and the cream faced loon, earning his Equity card and establishing himself as a member of the company for the next four years. The following year he played Caliban in Cheek by Jowl’s The Tempest which opened at the Taormina Festival, Sicily.

He also appeared in Cheek by Jowl’s productions of Philoctetes by Sophocles and Miss Sara Sampson by Gotthold Lessing. His fifth and final collaboration with the company was playing Horatio to Timothy Walker’s Hamlet in a production which played in London, UK, Europe, Hong Kong and Japan.

In 1992, Duff created the role of Willie Dobie in Scottish playwright Simon Donald’s new play, The Life of Stuff, at The Traverse Theatre in Edinburgh with Shirley Henderson. Duff also appeared in the British premiere of Physical Jerks at Alan Ayckbourn’s Stephen Joseph Theatre Scarborough, Life Goes On written by Adrian Hodges at The Haymarket Basingstoke, Three Sisters at Liverpool Everyman, Time and the Room at the Gate Theatre London and the eponymous role in Anatol by Arthur Schnitzler at Nottingham Playhouse. At the National Theatre, Duff played Bartolomeo Pergami in Nick Stafford’s new play Battle Royal directed by Howard Davies, which starred Zoe Wanamaker and Simon Russell Beale. In 2002, he was Jason opposite Maureen Beattie’s Medea in Theatre Babel’s production of Liz Lochhead’s adaptation of Medea at the Edinburgh Festival and then on tour.

On television, Duff played the dope-smoking Doc Brown in the cult BBC 1 series Hamish Macbeth devised by Daniel Boyle and set in the Highlands of Scotland, co-starring with Robert Carlyle for three series (1995 - 1997). He starred as Geoff Spiller in the short-lived BBC comedy Big Kids with Imogen Stubbs (2000). For two years Duff was nefarious property developer Lewis Cope in BBC Scotland’s BAFTA Award winning drama River City (2002 - 2004) set in Glasgow.

Duff has leading roles in TV dramas such as: Why We Went To War (2006) playing Jonathan Powell; Roman Mysteries (2007) portraying the Emperor Domitian; the first season of TV show Skins (2007) playing evangelistic Congratulations Leader Pete; Purves & Pekkala (2009) AKA New Town by Annie Griffin, playing highly strung architectural preservationist Ernst de Bont; the beleaguered Governor of Boulogne in The Tudors (2010); TV presenter Tom Sutherland in the BBC series Lip Service (2010).

Duff has also acted in sitcoms: May To December (1994), The Creatives (1998), Not Going Out (2008). He was the anchor Richard Pritchard co-starring with Sharon Horgan in Broken News (2005) by John Morton for BBC and Gus Plotpoint in Charlie Brooker’s Touch of Cloth (2013) for Sky. In the cinema he has appeared in comedy roles in Carry On Columbus (1992), Festival (2005) directed by Annie Griffin, Wild Target (2010) directed by Jonathan Lynn, and Burke & Hare (2010) directed by comedy legend John Landis. Duff has appeared in dozens of short films, two of which were nominated for awards: King’s Christmas (1986; BAFTA nominated) and The Girls (2007; BIFA nominated).

Duff portrayed: Austin Dickinson, the brother of American poet Emily Dickinson, played by Cynthia Nixon, in Terence Davies's A Quiet Passion (2016); also starring Jennifer Ehle, Keith Carradine, Catherine Bailey, Joanna Bacon and Emma Bell. It was described by Richard Brody of The New Yorker as "an absolute drop-dead masterwork".

== Filmography ==
Television
Year	Title	Role	Notes
1990	The Wreck on the Highway		
1990	Taggart	Porter	Episode: Hostile Witness
1990	This is David Harper	Lorry Driver	Episode: A List Of Abuses
1991	Casualty	Policeman	Episode: Something to Hide
1992	Between The Lines	Officer 1	Episode: Out of the Game
1992	In Dreams	Vicar	
1993	Calling The Shots	Matt	
1994	May to December	Robbie	Episode: Son of my Father
1995–1997	Hamish Macbeth	Doc Brown	19 episodes
1996	Taggart	Stephen Harding	Episode: Angel Eyes
1998	The Creatives	Greg Jackson	Episode: Come to Cummerton
2001	Casualty	Pete	Episode: For My Next Trick
2000	Big Kids	Dr. Geoffrey Spiller	
2002	River City	Lewis Cope	
2004	If...	George Rowling Q.C.	
2005	The Bill	Brian York	Episodes: - No. 299 / No. 300
2005	Broken News	Richard Pritchard	6 episodes
2006	Why We Went To War	Jonathan Powell	
2006	Rosemary & Thyme	Frank Minelli	Episode: Seeds of Time
2006	Not Going Out	Pete	Episode: Caretaker
2006	Doctor Who	Newsreader	Episodes: Rise of the Cybermen / Age of Steel
2007	Skins	Congratulations Leader	Episode: Cassie
2007	Roman Mysteries	Emperor Domitian	
2009	New Town	Ernst de Bont	
2010	The Tudors	The Governor of Boulogne	Episode: As It Should Be
2010	Taggart	Sammy Kirkwood	
2010	Lip Service	Tom Sutherland	
2011	Casualty	Professor Michael Fitch	Episode: Starting Out
2012	Silent Witness	Counsel 2	
2013	Lee Nelson's Well Funny People	Football Team Manager	
2013	A Touch of Cloth	Gus Plotpoint	
2014	Waterloo Road	Arran Mackenzie	
2020	The Crown	Cecil Parkinson	Episode: War (Season 4, Episode 10)
Film
Year	Film	Role	Notes
1986	King's Christmas	Trevor King	BAFTA Nominated
1992	Carry On Columbus	Inquisitor #2	
1998	Middleton's Changeling	Antonio	
2005	Festival	Gordon Menzies	
2007	If I'm Spared	Tom	
2007	The Girls	Richard	BIFA Nominated
2010	Wild Target	The Jeweller	
2010	Burke & Hare	The Attendant	
2011	Island	Social Worker	
2013	Killer Moves	The Velvet Glove	
2014	Ivory Stage	Peter Grey	
2016	A Quiet Passion	Austin Dickinson	
2016	Clean Sheets	Will	
2017	Seeing Him	Mark	
2017	Rehab Matters	Robert	
2018	Sleep	Armando	
2020	The Bay of Silence	Curator	
