= Gulag (1985 film) =

- Based on: story by Yehousha Ben-Porat; Dan Gordon; Raphael Shauli
- Written by: Dan Gordon
- Directed by: Roger Young
- Music by: Elmer Bernstein
- Country of origin: United States
- Original language: English

Production
- Producer: Andrew Adelson
- Production companies: HBO Premiere Films; Lorimar Pictures; MFI Furniture Group
- Budget: $5 million

Original release
- Network: HBO
- Release: January 13, 1985

Gulag is a 1985 drama and film directed by Roger Young, aired originally on HBO and later released to home video. It was reviewed by the New York Times.

== Synopsis ==
TV reporter and former star athlete Mickey Almon is covering an international athletic event in Moscow when he is arrested by the KGB after being approached by a Russian scientist wanting him to smuggle secret information out of the Soviet Union. Almon is imprisoned and interrogated over several days by prison official Bukovsky who ultimately forces him to confess to being a spy for the United States. Though promised with release for doing so, Almon is instead transported to a railway station and placed aboard a train on a Stolypin prison car with other political prisoners bound for a Gulag labour camp near the Arctic Circle. After arriving, Almon meets a fellow foreign prisoner, a heroic Englishman who teaches him how to survive the brutal life of the camp. In time, after learning that his ultimate fate in the camp will eventually be death through hazardous labour, Almon and the Englishman conspire together to plot an escape to Norway.

== Cast ==
- David Keith as Mickey Almon
- Malcolm McDowell as Kenneth "Englishman" Barrington
- David Suchet as Matvei
- Warren Clarke as Hooker
- John McEnery as Diczek
- Nancy Paul as Susan Almon
- Brian Pettifer as Vlasov
- George Pravda as Bukovsky
- Eugene Lipinski as Yuri
- Shane Rimmer as Jay
- Ray Jewers as TV Interviewer
- Bogdan Kominowski as Stolypin Guard

== Production ==
Production company Lorimar claimed the story was based on fact. Gulag was actually based on material gathered from Soviet dissidents who succeeded in emigrating to Israel. Aleksandr Solzhenitsyn's The Gulag Archipelago was also cited as a source of "similar incidents" portrayed in the film.

The film was shot in London and in Norway. Seva Novgorodtsev, a Russian emigre who owns a company called Russian Roulette, served as technical adviser.

== Home media ==
The film was released on VHS and Betamax by Prism Entertainment under license from Lorimar. But, this film was produced by Lorimar Productions and it belongs to same company (subsequently later it owned by Warner Bros.) originally. However, it never released on DVD or Blu-ray by Warner Bros. Home Entertainment.
