= Ralph Riach =

Scottish actor (1936–2022)

Ralph McKenzie Riach (26 January 1936 – 20 March 2022) was a Scottish actor from Elgin, Moray.

== Early years ==
Riach was born in Elgin, Scotland. He was educated at the Royal Conservatoire of Scotland in Glasgow, and he worked in Perth on a variety of jobs before he began his acting career.

== Career ==
Riach portrayed John McIver (better known as "TV John") in BBC One Scotland's comedy/drama Hamish Macbeth. His career began at the age of 50, when he appeared in Lost Empires (1986). He appeared in television shows including Chancer, Mosley, Taggart, Monarch of the Glen, Peak Practice, Doctor Finlay, and Tutti Frutti.

Film appearances included The House of Mirth (2000), The Messenger: The Story of Joan of Arc (1999), Braveheart (1995), Copying Beethoven (2006) and Cloud Atlas (2012). He also portrayed John Laurie in We're Doomed! The Dad's Army Story (2015). In 2014, he played a scene in Scottish feature film Time Teens: The Beginning directed by Ryan Alexander Dewar. He appeared in the short film Darkness in The Afternoon in 1999.

== Filmography ==
=== Film ===
| Year | Title | Role | Notes |
|---|---|---|---|
| 1990 | Crossing the Line | Laundry Manager | |
| 1995 | Braveheart | Priest No. 1 | |
| 1997 | In Praise of Older Women | Conde | |
| 1998 | Dangerous Beauty | Lorenzo Gritti | |
| 1998 | The Governess | Mr. Hewlett | |
| 1999 | My Life So Far | Sir David Drummond | |
| 1999 | The Messenger: The Story of Joan of Arc | English Judge | |
| 2000 | The House of Mirth | Lord Hubert Dacy | |
| 2002 | Anazapta | Physician | |
| 2004 | One Last Chance | Mr. Murray | |
| 2004 | The Rocket Post | Old Donald | |
| 2006 | Copying Beethoven | Wenzel Schlemmer | |
| 2007 | Death Defying Acts | Mr. Robertson | |
| 2008 | Is Anybody There? | Clive | |
| 2008 | Good | Brunau | |
| 2012 | Cloud Atlas | Ernie | |
| 2014 | What We Did on Our Holiday | Jimmy Cazzarotto | |
| 2015 | Time Teens | The Meridian | |
| 2018 | The Party's Just Beginning | The Caller | |

=== Television ===
| Year | Title | Role | Notes |
|---|---|---|---|
| 1986 | Lost Empires | Edinburgh Empire M.D. | Episode #1.1 |
| 1986–2003 | Taggart | Various roles | 5 episodes |
| 1986 | First Among Equals | Frank Boyle | Episode #1.8 |
| 1987 | Tutti Frutti | Barman | Episode: "Don't You Rock Me Daddy-O" |
| 1987 | Watching | Mr. Ambrose | 2 episodes |
| 1988 | City Lights | Glasgow Museum Official | Episode: "I'm Willie, Fly Me" |
| 1990 | The Play on One | Fr Maxwell | Episode: "Changing Step" |
| 1990–1991 | Chancer | Willy Stebbings | 15 episodes |
| 1991 | 4 Play | John Breck | Episode: "Ball on the States" |
| 1991 | Clarissa | Uncle Anthony | 3 episodes |
| 1991, 1998 | Casualty | Mr. Nichol / Alex | 2 episodes |
| 1992 | Rides | Mr. Goodwin | Episode: "Which One of You Is the Victim?" |
| 1992 | The Bill | Gordon Ellis | Episode: "Priorities" |
| 1993 | Screen Two | Dr. Sutherland | Episode: "The Long Roads" |
| 1993–1994 | Doctor Finlay | Dr. Gilmore | 10 episodes |
| 1995 | Kavanagh QC | Malcolm Gibson | Episode: "Heartland" |
| 1995 | Wycliffe | Dr. Bonner | Episode: "Lost Contact" |
| 1995–1997 | Hamish Macbeth | TV John / Euan McIver | 20 episodes |
| 1997 | Lloyds Bank Channel 4 Film Challenge | Ted | Episode: "Nurse Ajax" |
| 1997, 2000 | Peak Practice | Malcolm McReadie / Mr. Rees | 2 episodes |
| 1998 | Mosley | Ramsay MacDonald | 3 episodes |
| 2000 | Murder Rooms: Mysteries of theReal Sherlock Holmes | The Strand Editor | Episode: "The Dark Beginnings of Sherlock Holmes" |
| 2000 | Randall and Hopkirk (Deceased) | Mr. Asmodius | Episode: "A Man of Substance" |
| 2000 | Brotherly Love | Reverend McDonald | 5 episodes |
| 2000, 2001 | Monarch of the Glen | Geordie McCann | 2 episodes |
| 2001 | The Russian Bride | Larry | Television film |
| 2003 | Canterbury Tales | Mr Malcolm Wickens | Episode: "The Miller's Tale" |
| 2004 | 55 Degrees North | Stanley Hanson | Episode #1.5 |
| 2004 | Quite Ugly One Morning | Alexander Kinross | Television film |
| 2005 | The Strange Case of Sherlock Holmes & Arthur Conan Doyle | Cleeve | Television film |
| 2006 | Low Winter Sun | Mister Gillot | Television film |
| 2007 | Wedding Belles | John Eddie | Television film |
| 2010–2011 | Rosamunde Pilcher's Shades of Love | Noel's Lawyer | 3 episodes |
| 2011 | South Riding | Lord Sedgmire | Episode #1.3 |
| 2011 | Young James Herriot | Professor Henry Legge | 3 episodes |
| 2011–2013 | Doctors | Marcus Tidwell / Ron Wise | 3 episodes |
| 2012 | New Tricks | Colin Ogilvy | Episode: "Glasgow UCOS" |
| 2013 | M.I. High | Bodger | Episode: "Grosse Encounters" |
| 2015 | Holby City | Frank Thorpe | Episode: "Cover Up" |
| 2015 | We're Doomed! The Dad's Army Story | John Laurie | Television film |
| 2016 | Shetland | Man on Beach | Episode #3.1 |
| 2017–2018 | Fortitude | Ralfi Sigurdson | 9 episodes |
| 2018 | Grandpa's Great Escape | Mr. Willkins | Television film |
| 2018 | Still Game | Old Ricky | Episode: "Balls Up" |
