= Paula Morris =

New Zealand writer

Paula Morris MNZM
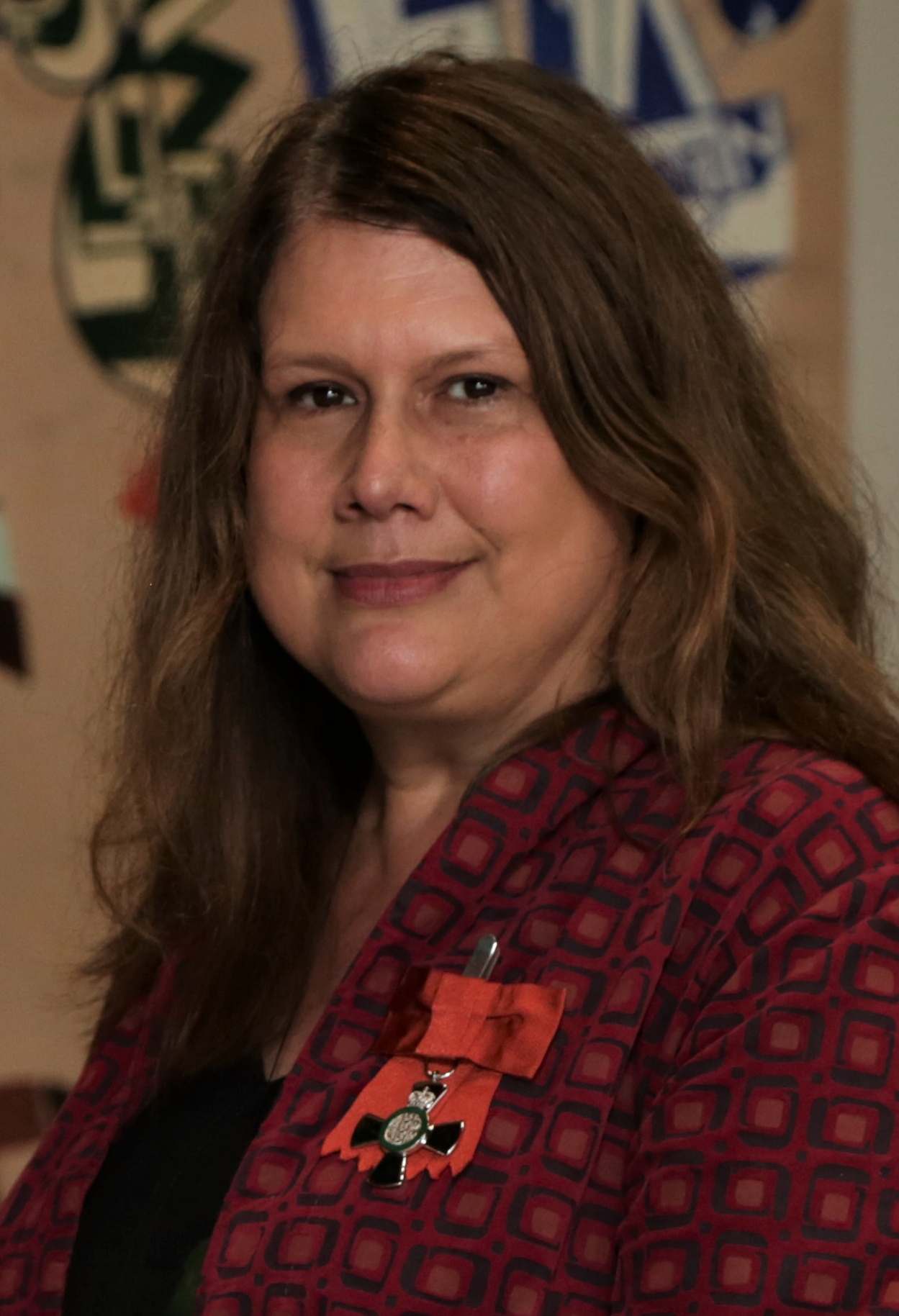
- Morris in 2019
- Born: Paula Jane Kiri Morris; 18 August 1965 (age 61); Auckland, New Zealand
- Occupations: Novelist; short-story writer; editor; literary academic

Academic background
- Education: University of York
- Thesis: Magnolias and rattlesnakes: the southern lady in American fiction (1989)
- Doctoral advisor: Hermione Lee

Paula Jane Kiri Morris MNZM (born 18 August 1965) is a New Zealand novelist, short-story writer editor and literary academic. She is an associate professor at the University of Auckland and founder of the Academy of New Zealand Literature.

== Life ==
Morris was born and raised in Auckland, New Zealand. Her father is a New Zealander and her mother is English; the family's tribal affiliations are Ngāti Wai, Ngāti Manuhiri and Ngāti Whātua. She graduated from the University of Auckland in 1985 with a BA in English and history, and moved to the United Kingdom the same year. After completing a DPhil at the University of York, under the supervision of Hermione Lee, and after a brief stint living in Manchester, she moved to London, working for BBC Radio 3 as a production assistant, Virgin Records as Press Officer for Virgin Classics, and PolyGram (now Universal) as Press and Promotions Manager for Philips.

In 1994, Morris moved to New York to become Product Manager for the German record label ECM, then distributed by BMG. During her four years at BMG Classics she rose to become Label Director of ECM and eventually vice-president of Marketing for World Music and Jazz.

Morris began taking fiction-writing classes at the West Side Y in 1997, and started making her living from writing two years later, freelancing as a copywriter and promotions manager for The New York Times, writing encyclopaedia entries for Contemporary Black Biography, and also working as a freelance branding consultant. In 2001 she moved back to New Zealand to join the MA in Creative Writing programme at the International Institute of Modern Letters, Victoria University of Wellington, where she was taught by Bill Manhire.

From 2002 to 2004, Morris attended the Iowa Writers' Workshop, where she was the recipient of the Glenn Schaeffer Fellowship (2002–03) and a Teaching-Writing Fellowship (2003–04), graduating with an MFA. In the spring of 2003 she was also the University of Iowa International Program's Writer-in-Residence.

From 2005 until 2010, Morris was an assistant professor at Tulane University in New Orleans, moving back to the UK in 2010 to teach at the University of Stirling in Scotland. At Stirling she was programme director of the new MLitt in Creative Writing (Prose).

Between 2012 and 2014, Morris was fiction writer-in-residence at the University of Sheffield. Since 2015 she has taught at the University of Auckland, where she convenes the Master of Creative Writing programme.

Her short story False River was shortlisted for the 2015 Sunday Times EFG Private Bank Short Story Award, the richest prize in the world for a single short story. It is the title story in her collection False River (Penguin, 2017), a book that combines stories and essays around the theme of lies and secret histories.

== Career ==
Morris's MA dissertation project at Victoria University won that year's Adam Foundation Prize and became her first published novel, Queen of Beauty (Penguin New Zealand, 2002). It won the NZSA Hubert Church Best Book of Fiction at the 2003 Montana New Zealand Book Awards.

Many of the stories that formed Morris' dissertation project at Iowa, supervised by Marilynne Robinson, are collected in Forbidden Cities (Penguin New Zealand, 2008), which was a finalist in the 2009 Commonwealth Prize SE Asia/Pacific region. At Iowa Morris also worked on two novels – Hibiscus Coast (Penguin New Zealand, 2005) and Trendy But Casual (Penguin New Zealand, 2007) – both of which she completed while living in New Orleans.

Her 2011 novel Rangatira won best work of fiction at the 2012 New Zealand Post Book Awards, and fiction winner at the 2012 Ngā Kupu Ora Māori Book Awards. The novel was serialised and broadcast by Radio New Zealand in 2012 and published in German that year by Walde + Graf. It was longlisted for the 2013 International Dublin Literary Award.

Morris has appeared at literary festivals and conferences in the US, China, New Zealand, the UK, Germany and Switzerland, and held a number of writer's residencies, including the Buddle Findlay Sargeson Fellowship in 2008 (with Brigid Lowry). During her tenure as a Sargeson fellow, Morris undertook two editorial projects: The Penguin Book of Contemporary New Zealand Short Stories (2008) and an expatriate-writing issue of Landfall.

She also wrote her first Young Adult novel, Ruined, published in 2009 by Scholastic US. Morris followed this with another YA supernatural mystery, Dark Souls (2011) and Unbroken (2013), which is a sequel to Ruined. Her most recent Young Adult novel is The Eternal City, set in contemporary Rome. In 2013 Morris published her first children's book, the second title in Puffin's New Zealand Girls series: Hene and the Burning Harbour.

Morris has been awarded a number of residencies, including the Brecht House in Denmark, and the Bellagio Foundation in Italy. In 2016 she was a writer-in-residence at the Passa Porta International House of Literature in Brussels. She has held two residencies at the International Writers' and translators' House in Ventspils, Latvia – in 2015 and 2017.

In 2018, she was awarded the Katherine Mansfield Menton Prize, and in the 2019 New Year Honours she appointed a Member of the New Zealand Order of Merit, for services to literature.

Morris was co-editor of two landmark anthologies of fiction, poetry and creative nonfiction: Ko Aotearoa Tātou (Otago University Press 2020) and, with Alison Wong, A Clear Dawn: New Asian Voices from Aotearoa New Zealand (Auckland University Press 2021). In 2020 she collaborated with photographer Haru Sameshima on Shining Land: Looking for Robin Hyde (Massey University Press), which was longlisted for the 2021 Ockham New Zealand Book Awards (Otago University Press 2020).

In November 2021 Morris launched the website KoreaSeen, a platform for reviews and articles about Korean television and film, both classic and contemporary.

An associate professor at the University of Auckland, Morris directs the Master of Creative Writing degree programme.

== Bibliography ==
- Queen of Beauty (2002)
- Hibiscus Coast (2005)
- Trendy but Casual (2007)
- Forbidden Cities (2008)
- The Penguin Book of Contemporary New Zealand Short Stories (editor) (2008)
- Ruined (2009)
- Dark Souls (2011)
- Rangatira (2011)
- Unbroken (2013)
- Hene and the Burning Harbour (2013)
- On Coming Home (2015)
- The Eternal City (2015)
- False River (2017)
- Shining Land: Looking for Robin Hyde (2020)
- Ko Aotearoa Tātou (2020)
- A Clear Dawn: New Asian Voices from Aotearoa New Zealand (2021)
