= The Chief (1990 TV series) =

British police procedural TV series (1990–1995)

- Genre: Crime drama
- Created by: Jeffrey Caine
- Starring: Tim Pigott-Smith; Martin Shaw; Karen Archer; Eamon Boland; Stuart McGugan; Gillian Bevan; Tony Caunter; Bosco Hogan
- Composers: Nigel Beaham-Powell; Bella Russell
- Country of origin: United Kingdom
- Original language: English
- No. of series: 5
- No. of episodes: 35

Production
- Executive producers: Brenda Reid; Chris Pye
- Producers: Ruth Boswell; John Davies
- Cinematography: Philip S. Burne
- Editors: Alan Newton; Richard Kennan; Keith Judge
- Running time: 50 minutes
- Production company: Anglia Television

Original release
- Network: ITV
- Release: 20 April 1990 – 16 June 1995

The Chief is a British television crime drama series that aired on ITV from 20 April 1990 until 16 June 1995. A total of five series and thirty-five episodes were produced.

== Overview ==
The series followed the work of the fictitious "Eastland Constabulary", particularly focusing on Chief Constable John Stafford (Tim Pigott-Smith), and his efforts to restore order within his volatile team. Later, focus shifted towards Stafford's replacement, Alan Cade (Martin Shaw). The series was produced by Anglia Television and was mostly filmed and set in East Anglia. The series was notable for a lot of political content, in particular for Stafford's battles with the Home Office and local politicians. John Alderson, a former Chief Constable of the Devon and Cornwall Police, was an adviser on the show, allowing it to be portrayed as reflecting real life.

== Cast ==
- Tim Pigott-Smith as Chief Constable John Stafford (Series 1–3)
- Martin Shaw as Chief Constable Alan Cade (Series 3–5)
- Karen Archer as Assistant Chief Constable / Acting Deputy Chief Constable / Acting Chief Constable Anne Stewart (Series 1–4)
- Eamon Boland as Detective Chief Superintendent Jim Gray (Series 1–3)
- Stuart McGugan as Detective Superintendent / Detective Chief Superintendent / Acting Assistant Chief Constable Sean McCloud (Series 3–4)
- Gillian Bevan as Detective Superintendent Rose Penfold (Series 5)
- Tony Caunter as Deputy Chief Constable / Acting Chief Constable Arthur Quine (Series 1–2)
- Bosco Hogan as Deputy Chief Constable Wes Morton (Series 5)
- Dean Lepley as PC Jack Sayers (Series 1–5)
- Brian Bovell as PC Charlie Webb (Series 5)
- Michael Cochrane as Nigel Crimmond (Series 1–5)
- Gillian Martell as Diane Lewis (Series 2–5)
- Judy Loe as Dr. Elizabeth Stafford (Series 1–3)
- Ross Livingstone as Tim Stafford (Series 1–2)
- T. P. McKenna as Colin Fowler (Series 2–4)
- Julian Glover as Andrew Blake (Series 5)

== Series overview ==
Series	Episodes	First airdate	Last airdate	DVD release
1	6	20 April 1990	25 May 1990	1 February 2010
2	6	5 April 1991	10 May 1991	12 April 2010
3	6	16 April 1993	21 May 1993	18 April 2011
4	10	7 January 1994	11 March 1994	18 July 2011
5	7	5 May 1995	16 June 1995	9 April 2012

The series has been released in Australia (Region 4): Series 1 and Series 2 on 5 March 2014; Series 3 and Series 4 on 7 May 2014; Series 5 on 9 July 2014; and "The Chief Collection" on 7 March 2018.

== Home media ==
A behind-the-scenes book, entitled On Duty with The Chief, written by Peter Haining, was published on 31 January 1995 to tie in with the broadcast of the fifth and final series. In 2010, Network began realising The Chief on Region 2 DVD, with a "12" certificate. The content has not been modified from the original broadcasts, and every episode contains the title cards for the commercial breaks. There are no special features.

== Episodes ==
=== Series 1 (1990) ===
No.	Title	Directed by	Written by	British air date
1	"Crash Course"	Brian Farnham	Jeffrey Caine	20 April 1990
John Stafford (Tim Pigott-Smith) takes up duty as the new chief constable for Eastland Police.
2	"Daydreamer"	Brian Farnham	Jeffrey Caine	27 April 1990
Stafford is accused of being overly soft on the weeding of Special Branch files.
3	"Call Sign Bravo"	Brian Farnham	Jeffrey Caine	4 May 1990
Stafford intercepts Special Branch papers on their way to MI5. ACC Stewart (Karen Archer) is determined to clear her boss's name following his son's arrest.
4	"The Great Escape"	Brian Farnham	Jeffrey Caine	11 May 1990
Stafford has to contend with vigilante groups formed in response to the arrival of crack cocaine in the area.
5	"Ring O' Ring O' Roses"	Brian Farnham	James Fielding	18 May 1990
When a drugs raid goes badly wrong, a group of militant university students challenges Stafford's authority.
6	"For Whom the Bell Tolls"	Brian Farnham	James Fielding	25 May 1990
Stafford's ongoing battles with the Home Office reach crisis point.

=== Series 2 (1991) ===
No.	Title	Directed by	Written by	British air date
1	"A Sudden Cause for Demonstration"	Desmond Davis	Jeffrey Caine	5 April 1991
Stafford returns from suspension and is immediately called upon to deal with a series of bomb threats by animal rights activists.
2	"Walk Home"	Desmond Davis	Jeffrey Caine	12 April 1991
A hitchhiker is kidnapped, and Stafford has to deal with an ensuing siege. Stewart contends with vigilante security guards working on a private estate.
3	"Jack and Jill"	Desmond Davis	Jeffrey Caine	19 April 1991
Stafford continues to deal with the siege at the hospital. A female officer resigns from the force, citing sexual harassment. Stewart's husband, Martin, walks out on her.
4	"Take Care"	Desmond Davis	Jeffrey Caine	26 April 1991
Stafford considers whether to allow the screening of a controversial documentary about BSE. Stewart gets into hot water.
5	"Deep Breath"	Desmond Davis	Peter Pallister	3 May 1991
Two youths throw bricks from a walkway bridge and hit a police car, killing an officer. Stafford deals with the subsequent unrest on a housing estate.
6	"The Thunder and the Lightning"	Desmond Davis	Peter Pallister	10 May 1991
A child playing on a beach is poisoned by spillage from an oil tanker. Stafford is ordered to evict a group of environmental protesters from a ship carrying toxic waste.

=== Series 3 (1993) ===
No.	Title	Directed by	Written by	British air date
1	"The Time for Change"	A.J. Quinn	Peter Jukes	16 April 1993
Stafford becomes Head of Europol, but the position gives him plenty of free time, so the Home Office asks him to tackle corruption within the Metropolitan Police as Alan Cade arrives. Anne has a promotion board for DCC, while also dealing with a major firearms incident in Norfolk.
2	"Songbird"	A.J. Quinn	Peter Jukes	23 April 1993
Stafford's corruption inquiry reaches a successful conclusion, and the officer who assisted him with the case is appointed as Eastland's new chief constable.
3	"A Long Cold Lonely Winter"	A.J. Quinn	Ray Jenkins	30 April 1993
An American gas rig is hijacked on Alan Cade (Martin Shaw)'s first day, but will his choice of negotiator pay off?
4	"Seeing Red"	A.J. Quinn	Ray Jenkins	7 May 1993
A hospital laboratory technician implicates a local councillor in illegal working practices. When he believes his accusations are being ignored, he dramatically breaks through the cordons during a royal visit to a school concert.
5	"The Trust of Justice"	A.J. Quinn	Peter Jukes	14 May 1993
Cade allows a police informant to orchestrate a drug deal while investigating a smuggling ring, only to find it leads to his death.
6	"Dealbreaker"	A.J. Quinn	Ray Jenkins	21 May 1993
When Cade is threatened with an investigation over the death of a drugs informer, his team closes ranks. The Home Office, preferring to have a hold on its maverick chief constable, decides not to act.

=== Series 4 (1994) ===
No.	Title	Directed by	Written by	British air date
1	"In the Wake of Terror"	A.J. Quinn	Peter Jukes	7 January 1994
A bomb blast in Norwich’s Royal Arcade leads to suspected IRA involvement. Cade isn’t happy that he is being kept in the dark, and goes toe-to-toe with Special Branch over their refusal to allow images of the suspects to be released to the press. When a commuter train full of children becomes the next target, Cade finds himself the subject of public outrage. And if that were not enough, his girlfriend leaves him.
2	"The Magician's Key"	A.J. Quinn	Ray Jenkins	14 January 1994
A passenger plane carrying Chinese illegals docks at Dipton airfield, but an argument leads to the brutal murder of a Triad. As the operation is linked to the Belgian embassy, Cade is forced to deal with a less than helpful Commissars, who appears to be untrustworthy. As chaos unfolds, Triad gangsters arrive in Eastland to avenge the murder of one of their own.
3	"Hammer and Tongs"	Roger Gartland	Ray Jenkins	21 January 1994
The Raglan estate becomes Cade’s latest target in an anti-social behaviour war when a man phones into a local radio show, threatening to set alight to local youths unless action is taken. Meanwhile, a veteran criminal brutally attacks a defenceless pensioner during a burglary on her home, and after a series of intimidation attempts, Cade sticks his neck out to protect the only witness prepared to stand against him.
4	"Pretty Face"	Roger Gartland	Michael Russell	28 January 1994
A break in at a chemical engineering warehouse leads to a young PC being badly injured in a hit-and-run. Cade is furious to discover that the perpetrators are none other than a group of inept customs and excise officers working undercover. Meanwhile, with the departure of Anne Stewart, Cade agrees to employ pushy public relations executive Alison Dell in an attempt to boost the force's image following the terror scandal.
5	"Extreme Delegation"	A.J. Quinn	Michael Russell	4 February 1994
Hilary Scott is attacked by anti-abortionists on her way to the clinic. Terrified by their campaign, she goes home to rethink her decision.
6	"Forger's Gamble"	A.J. Quinn	Michael Russell	11 February 1994
Cade causes controversy when he announces a radical plan to decriminalise certain drugs for an experimental trial.
7	"Four and Twenty Blackbirds"	Roger Gartland	Peter Jukes	18 February 1994
Cade's life is put in jeopardy when a visiting Italian judge is the victim of an assassination attempt.
8	"Strained Relations"	A.J. Quinn	Peter Jukes	25 February 1994
Tensions between the police and the Crown Prosecution Service mount following the acquittal of a child murderer.
9	"The Right Wing"	A.J. Quinn	Peter Jukes	4 March 1994
A group of Neo-Nazis plans to raid the home of a local councillor.
10	"Appropriate Force"	A.J. Quinn	Peter Jukes	11 March 1994
Cade is forced to defend his team when an illegal immigrant dies while officers attempt to restrain him.

=== Series 5 (1995) ===
No.	Title	Directed by	Written by	British air date
1	"Gunfire"	Tom Cotter	Maggie Allen	5 May 1995
Cade's attitude to firearms is challenged after an armed robbery on a countryside mansion.
2	"Public Outcry"	Tom Cotter	Len Collin	12 May 1995
Cade faces a dilemma after a child is killed by joyriders on a local estate.
3	"Written in History"	Rick Stroud	Anthony Read	19 May 1995
Two deadly incidents of racial hatred, more than 20 years apart, cause problems for Cade.
4	"Nuclear"	Tom Cotter	Steve Griffiths	26 May 1995
A large demonstration takes place at a nuclear plant while Cade is away investigating a member of the force.
5	"Running Out of Friends"	Tom Cotter	Ian Kennedy Martin	2 June 1995
Cade leans on an old friend when he suspects the others are conspiring against him.
6	"Internal Affairs"	Tom Cotter	Susan Wilkins	9 June 1995
Emotions run high when charges of harassment are brought within the Eastland force – and against it.
7	"The End of the Line"	Rick Stroud	Ian Kennedy Martin	16 June 1995
Cade's future is in doubt when he comes under fire from the tabloid press.
