= Brian Pettifer =

British actor (born 1953)

- Born: 1 January 1953 (age 73); Durban, South Africa
- Occupation: Actor
- Years active: 1966–Present
- Family: Linda Thompson (sister); Teddy Thompson (nephew); Kamila Thompson (niece)

Brian Pettifer (born 1 January 1953) is a Scottish actor who has appeared in many television shows, and also on stage and in film. He is the younger brother of folk musician Linda Thompson.

== Early life ==
Pettifer was born in Durban, South Africa, he subsequently moved with his family to Glasgow, Scotland in 1961, where he lived for the next decade. He studied a junior course at the Royal Scottish Academy, where he happened to be in the same class as future acting colleague Alex Norton.

== Career ==
He began his career as a child in various BBC Scotland productions including This Man Craig and Dr. Finlay's Casebook. In 1971 he moved to London during the course of that decade he featured in supporting roles in a number of TV series including Timeslip, Take Three Girls, Villains, Sutherland's Law, Last of the Summer Wine and Return of the Saint. He also played cousin Hughie in the long running Liverpool based 70s sitcom The Liver Birds. Between 1975 to 1978, he appeared as Bruce Leckie in national service comedy Get Some In!, where he was the butt of jokes directed at him by Corporal Marsh played by Tony Selby.

His first film role was in Lindsay Anderson's film if.... (1968). He also appeared in Anderson's O Lucky Man! (1973) and Britannia Hospital (1982) playing the same character in all three Anderson films, that of Biles. His other film credits include roles in Amadeus (1984), A Christmas Carol (1984), Gulag (1985), Heavenly Pursuits (1986), Little Dorrit (1987), The Great Escape II: The Untold Story (1988), Loch Ness (1996), The House of Mirth (2000), Dr Jekyll and Mr Hyde (2002), The Rocket Post (2004), Vanity Fair (2004) and Lassie (2005). In 2001, he played Alfred Meyer in the BBC/HBO film Conspiracy.

Pettifer was a regular in Rab C. Nesbitt, as Andra Binnie, a dim-witted companion of Rab, who was mainly seen propping up the bar. He reportedly hated filming the show and never watched any of the 50 episodes that he appeared in. Between 1995 to 1997, he appeared in all 20 episodes of Hamish Macbeth, as grocery shop owner Rory Campbell who tries to keep his ongoing relationship with Esme (Anne Lacey) a secret.

In 2001, he played the part of Dr. Cameron in the Radio 4 series entitled Adventures of a Black Bag, based on the books by A.J. Cronin that chart the early years of Dr. Finlay.

The following year he guest starred in an episode of Still Game. In 2005, he appeared in the first episode of the BBC drama Bleak House. In 2011 and 2013, he played Father Richards in The Field of Blood. In 2012, Brian Pettifer appeared as Archie Milgrow in the episode Old School Ties in the series New Tricks. He also appeared in the reaccuring role of Poupart in the BBC One series The Musketeers. In 2019, he appeared in an episode of Holby City playing patient Laurie Stocks.

In 2015, Pettifer appeared in the crime comedy The Legend of Barney Thomson along with his Hamish Macbeth co-star Robert Carlyle. The following year he played Angus in the remake of Whisky Galore! (2016). In 2021, he portrayed Billy a drunken bus passenger, alongside Timothy Spall in the road-trip drama The Last Bus.

== Theatre ==
Pettifer's stage career has encompassed a wide range of supporting and ensemble roles in various Scottish and English theatre productions. In 1985 he appeared in the touring production of Trumpets and Raspberries, an English language adaption of the Italian farce comedy by Dario Fo which was originally staged at the Edinburgh Fringe then toured around Scotland. Following a sell out tour, a second tour took place the following year. Pettifer appeared in the dual role of Father Bridaine and De Strop in Declan Donnellan's Cheek by Jowl production of Alfred de Musset's Don't Fool with Love, paired with The Blind Man, which were both staged at the Donmar Warehouse in 1993. Pettifer played the School Board President in the satirical play The Government Inspector by Nikolai Gogol at the Almeida Theatre, London during the 1997-8 season, which later transferred to the King's Theatre in Edinburgh.

In 2002, Pettifer played the title role in Uncle Vanya, an adaption of Chekhov's play by poet Tom Leonard, with additional Scottish dialect. He played Snug in the Glyndebourne Festival Opera production of the Fairy-Queen, an opera by Henry Purcell based on Shakespeare's A Midsummer Night's Dream. It debuted at the Glyndebourne Festival in 2009 where it was lauded for its creative spectable, the production then toured internationally at the Opéra Comique, Paris in January 2010 and the Brooklyn Academy of Music, New York in March 2010 as part of a co-production with those two venues, a further a revival was staged at the Glyndebourne Festival in 2012. In 2015, Pettifer appeared alongside his Rab C. Nesbitt co-stars Gregor Fisher and Barbara Rafferty in the National Theatre of Scotland's touring production of Yer Granny, an adaption of La Nona by Argentine playwright Roberto Cossa, in this version the setting was changed to 1970's Scotland.

Pettifer made his directorial debut in Dead Funny by Terry Johnson, staged by the Borderline Theatre Company which toured around Scotland following its Edinburgh premiere in 2004. Two years later, he worked again with the company, where he directed Losing Louis by Simon Williams at the Byre Theatre in St Andrews, an adaption of the farce by Simon Mendes de Costa.

== Selected Filmography ==
=== Film ===
Year	Title	Role	Notes
1968	if....	Biles - Junior	
1973	O Lucky Man!	Laurence Biles	
1982	Britannia Hospital	Biles: Administration	
1984	Amadeus	Hospital Attendant	
1984	A Christmas Carol	Ben	TV movie
1985	Gulag	Vlasov	TV movie
1986	Heavenly Pursuits	Father Cobb	
1987	Little Dorrit	Clarence Barnacle	
1988	The Great Escape II: The Untold Story	Kirby-Green	TV movie
1995	In the Bleak Midwinter	Ventriloquist	
1996	Loch Ness	Repairman	
1997	The James Gang	Spanner	
1998	Vigo	Fatman	
1999	The Messenger: The Story of Joan of Arc	The Executioner / Torturer at Process	
2000	The House of Mirth	Mr. Bry	
2001	Conspiracy	Alfred Meyer	
2003	Dr Jekyll and Mr Hyde	Poole	TV movie
2004	One Last Chance	Macgregor	
2004	The Rocket Post	Reverend Shand	
2004	Vanity Fair	Mr. Raggles	
2005	Lassie	O'Donnell	
2010	Donkeys	Brian Colburn	
2011	Hattie	Ron	TV movie
2015	The Legend of Barney Thomson	Charlie Taylor	
2016	Whisky Galore!	Angus	
2017	Darkest Hour	Lord Kingsley Wood	
2019	Get Duked!	PC Dougie	
2021	The Last Bus	Billy	
2024	Damaged	Village Man	

=== Television ===
Year	Title	Role	Notes
1965 - 1967	Dr. Finlay's Casebook	Various	4 episodes
1966 - 1967	This Man Craig	James Craig	22 episodes
1969	ITV Sunday Night Theatre	Adam Armour	Episode: "My Bonnie Jean"
1970	Armchair Theatre	Nigel Purvis	Episode: "Warm Feet, Warm Heart"
1970	Thirty-Minute Theatre	Spratt	Episode: "Is That Your Body, Boy?"
1970	Redgauntlet	Rab	2 episodes (mini-series)
1970 - 1971	Timeslip	Paul	6 episodes
1970 - 1972	Play for Today	Schoolboy/ Youth	2 episodes
1971	Take Three Girls	Reggie	Episode: "Duet for Two Left Feet"
1972	The Liver Birds	Cousin Hughie	2 episodes
1972	Villains	Youth	Episode: "Chas"
1973	Hunter's Walk	Gordon	Episode: "Outcast"
1973	Six Days of Justice	David Galloway	Episode: "We'll Support You Evermore"
1973	Sutherland's Law	Stevie Sampson	Episode: "The Ship"
1974	Bedtime Stories	Alan	Episode: "The Water Maiden"
1975 - 1978	Get Some In!	Bruce Leckie	34 episodes
1976	Clayhanger	Stifford	3 episodes
1976	Last of the Summer Wine	The Best Man	Episode: "Going to Gordon's Wedding"
1978	Return of the Saint	Bartender	Episode: "The Arrangement"
1982	Cloud Howe	Dite Peat	3 episodes (mini-series)
1983	Father's Day	Attendant's Son	Episode: "They'll Never Learn"
1986	Farrington of the F.O.	Billy Murdoch	Episode: "Tourists"
1987	City Lights	Alisdair	Episode: "Crimewatch OK"
1987 - 2005	Taggart	Ian Summerville/ Sir Archie Drummond/ Arthur Magee	4 episodes
1988	Screen Two	Cyril	Episode: "Lucky Sunil"
1988 - 2014	Rab C. Nesbitt	Andra Binnie	50 episodes
1989	Coronation Street	Bernie Bagshaw	2 episodes
1990 - 1994	The Bill	Family Doctor/ Billy Hardy	2 episodes
1993	Lovejoy	Willie Kinross	Episode: "The Colour of Mary"
1994	Dandelion Dead	Bank Manager	4 episodes (mini-series)
1994	Nice Day at the Office	Dave	6 episodes
1994	The Tales of Para Handy	Newspaper Editor	Episode: "The End of the World"
1995	Degrees of Error	Dr. Benson	3 episodes
1995	The Ghostbusters of East Finchley	Howard Heights	Episode #1.6
1995 - 1997	Hamish Macbeth	Rory Campbell/ Hector Campbell	20 episodes
1997	The Baldy Man	Various	2 episodes
1997	The History of Tom Jones, a Foundling	Parson Supple	5 episodes (mini-series)
1998	Invasion: Earth	Motorist	Episode: "Only the Dead"
1999	Life Support	Gordon Travers	3 episodes
2000	My Family	Mr. Hodder	Episode: "Pain in the Class"
2001	Monarch of the Glen	Eric Morton	Episode #2.6
2002	Dalziel and Pascoe	Mortimer	Episode: "The Unwanted"
2002	Rockface	Brother Thomas	Episode #1.6
2002	Snoddy	Professor Baxter	3 episodes
2003	Still Game	Bert	Episode: "Wummin"
2004	Heartbeat	Andrew McIntyre	Episode: "Down to Earth
2004	Hustle	Tip Jones	Episode: "Picture Perfect"
2005	Bleak House	Mr. Growler	Episode #1.12
2005	Till the Ends of the Earth	Wheeler	3 episodes (mini-series)
2009	Collison	Ed Wilson	3 episodes (mini-series)
2010	Garrow's Law	Robert Boycott	Episode #2.3
2011	Doc Martin	Mr. Coley	Episode: "Don't Let Go"
2011 - 2013	The Field of Blood	Father Richards	4 episodes
2012	New Tricks	Archie Milgrow	Episode: "Old School Ties"
2014 - 2015	The Musketeers	Poupart	3 episodes
2015	Jonathan Strange & Mr Norrell	Honeyfoot	7 episodes
2017	Black Mirror	William Grange	Episode: "Crocodile"
2018	Doctors	Weslie 'Wes' Knight	Episode: "Our Time"
2019	Holby City	Laurie Stocks	Episode: "China Crisis"
2022	Grace	Hector Hegarty	Episode: "Dead Man's Footsteps"
2022	Outlander	Old Charlie	Episode: "Echoes"
2023	Endeavour	Jephthah Claypole	Episode: "Exeunt"

== Selected Theatre Credits ==
Year	Title	Role	Company	Director	Notes
1979	The House	Billy	Joint Stock Theatre Company	Richard Wilson	Play by David Halliwell, staged at Arts Centre, Darlington and ICA Theatre, London.
1985 - 1986	Trumpets and Raspberries	The Doctor	Borderline Theate Company	Morag Fullerton	Play by Dario Fo (adapted by Roger McAvoy and Anna Maria-Guigini), toured at various theatres across Scotland and Northern Ireland.
1989	The Misanthrope	Clitandre	Bristol Old Vic Theatre Company	Paul Unwin	Play by Jean-Baptiste Molière (adapted by Tony Harrison), staged at National Theatre, London and Bristol Old Vic - Theatre Royal, Bristol.
1990	The Ship	Pat	The Ship's Company, Govan	Bill Bryden	Play by Bill Bryden, staged at Harland and Wolff, Govan.
1992	A Midsummer Night's Dream	Tom Snout	National Theatre	Robert Lepage	Play William Shakespeare, staged at National Theatre, London.
1993	The Blind Men	De Stropp	Cheek by Jowl	Declan Donnellan	Play by Michel de Ghelderode, staged at Donmar Warehouse, London.
1993	Don’t Fool with Love	Father Bridaine	Cheek by Jowl	Declan Donnellan	Play by Alfred de Musset, staged at Donmar Warehouse, London.
1997 - 1998	The Government Inspector	School Board Governor	Almeida Theatre	Jonathan Kent	Play by Nikolai Gogol, staged at Almeida Theatre, London and King's Theatre, Edinburgh.
1997 - 1998	Shining Souls	Vincent/ The Minister	Peter Hall Theatre Company	Chris Hannan	Play by Chris Hannan, staged The Old Vic, London.
2000	Victoria	Armitage / Bryce / Businessman / Callum / Carter	Royal Shakespeare Company	Anna Mackmin	Play by David Greig, staged at The Other Place, Stratford upon Avon.
2002	Uncle Vanya	Uncle Vanya	Theatre Babel	Graham McLaren	Play by Anton Chekhov (adapted by Tom Leonard), toured at the Royal Lyceum, Edinburgh.
2009 - 2010/ 2012	The Fairy-Queen	Snug	Glyndebourne Festival Opera	Jonathan Kent	Play by Henry Purcell, staged at Glyndebourne, East Sussex, followed by international tour.
2015	Yer Granny	Uncle Tam	National Theatre of Scotland	Graham McLaren	Play by Roberto Cossa (adapted by Douglas Maxwell), toured at various theatres across Scotland.
