= Liza Walker =

English actress

- Born: United Kingdom

Liza Walker is a British actress known for the films Hackers (1995) and The Jungle Book (1994), and the television series Maigret (1992).

She received the 1997 Jack Tinker Award for Most Promising Newcomer for her performance in Closer at the Royal National Theatre.

== Filmography ==
- El Sueno Del Mono Loco (Twisted Obsession), 1989
- Buddy's Song, 1991
- Teenage Health Freak, 1991 TV series
- Century, 1993
- Marooned, 1994 short film
- The Jungle Book, 1994
- Solitaire for 2, 1995
- Hackers, 1995
- Savage Play, 1995
- E=Mc2, 1996
- The Escort, 1999
- London's Burning, 2002 TV series
- Closer, 1997 stage play

== Guest appearances and cameos ==
- Casualty, episode "A Will to Die", 1990
- Boon, episode "Pillow Talk", 1991
- Inspector Morse, episode "Cherubim and Seraphim", 1992
- Maigret, episode "Maigret on the Defensive", 1992
- Casualty, episode "Sunday, Bloody Sunday", 1993
- Minder, episode "The Roof of All Evil", 1993
- 99-1, episode "Where The Money Is", 1994
- The Good Sex Guide, episode "2.2", 1994
- The Bill, episodes "Blind Alley" and "Getting Personal", 2008, and episode "Return of the Hunter", 2001
- Casualty, episode "Black Dog Day", 2003
- Dalziel and Pascoe, episode " Glory Days" 2006
- Doctors, episode "Guilty", 2010
