= Savage Play =

Savage Play is a 1995 New Zealand drama film directed by Alan Lindsay and starring Peter Bland, Paris Jefferson and featuring James Fleming. The screenplay concerns a young New Zealander searching for his father.

== Plot summary ==
During a rugby tour of Britain and Ireland in 1888, a young New Zealander searches for his father who he has never met. While there he falls in love with the daughter of an aristocrat.

== Cast ==
- Peter Bland ... Prince of Wales
- James Fleming ... Wrestler
- Paris Jefferson ... Violet
- Peter Kaa ... Pony
- Rena Owen ... Takiora
- Gavin Richards ... Kim
- Ian Richardson ... Count
- Martyn Sanderson ... Henry
- Robin Thomson ... Durham
- Liza Walker ... Charlotta
- Piripi Waretini ... Tabby
