= Rebecca K Reilly =

New Zealand author (born 1991)

- Born: 16 August 1991 (age 35); Waitakere City, New Zealand
- Education: Master of Arts, Victoria University of Wellington
- Occupation: Novelist
- Writing career
- Notable works: Greta & Valdin (2021)
- Website: rkr.rodeo

Rebecca Kay Reilly (born 16 August 1991) is a New Zealand author. Her debut novel Greta & Valdin (2021) was a bestseller in New Zealand and has received critical attention domestically and internationally. It received the 2019 Adam Foundation Prize in Creative Writing, the Hubert Church prize for the best first book of fiction at the 2022 Ockham New Zealand Book Awards and the 2022 Aotearoa Booksellers' Choice Award.

== Early life and education ==
Reilly was born on 16 August 1991 in Waitakere City, New Zealand. She is of Ngāti Hine and Ngāti Wai descent.

Reilly completed a Master of Arts in Creative Writing at the International Institute of Modern Letters at Victoria University of Wellington, where she was the 2019 recipient of the Adam Foundation Prize in Creative Writing for her debut novel, then titled Vines. It was subsequently renamed Greta & Valdin. The novel took her a year and a half to write, although she had been collecting material for 14 years.

== Career ==
Greta & Valdin was published by Victoria University Press in 2021. It is a novel about the family and romantic relationships of two siblings, both queer and of mixed Russian and Māori descent, and set in Auckland. Reviewer Hannah Tunnicliffe for Stuff said Reilly "fuses socio-political commentary with humour, making Greta & Valdin both smart and funny." Ash Davida Jane called it "the best novel of the year". Becky Manawatu praised "the tenderness Reilly achieves through her love for these characters, which translates page by page, word by word, to a love of people". Rachel O'Connor for Landfall noted a level of "information overload" but concluded "there is much to enjoy in Greta & Valdin, and hopefully much more to come from its author, whose youthful, funny voice delivers a fresh and entertaining tour of life and love in Auckland's CBD". Steve Braunias, in his list of the ten best New Zealand novels of 2021, ranked it as number one, calling it "the funniest and also the most original, enjoyable and best novel published in New Zealand in 2021".

Greta & Valdin was shortlisted for the Jann Medlicott Acorn Prize for Fiction at the 2022 Ockham New Zealand Book Awards, and was awarded the Hubert Church prize for the best first book of fiction. Reilly was one of two Māori authors shortlisted for the Jann Medlicott award. At the time of the shortlisting announcement it was the top book on the Nielsen best-seller books chart, and The Spinoff books editor Catherine Woulfe noted that the novel "will win by miles if the judges are of a mind to nod to the national mood". The book won the Aotearoa Booksellers' Choice Award at the 2022 Aotearoa Book Trade Industry Awards. It was third on the list of New Zealand fiction bestsellers of 2022.

In September 2022 Reilly was a judge, together with Harry Ricketts, of the Nine to Noon short story competition on Radio New Zealand.

Greta & Valdin was published in the UK and USA on 6 February 2024. A review by The New York Times described it as a "generous, tender debut novel of family and self-acceptance" and "so brimming with life it can feel almost dizzying". It received a starred review from Kirkus Reviews; the review's tagline was "Say hello to your new favorite fictional family". It was shortlisted for the Waterstones Debut Fiction Prize, a finalist for the Lambda Literary Award for Bisexual Literature, and listed as one of the best books of 2024 by TIME, NPR, and Harper's Bazaar.

In March 2026, Hutchinson Heinemann announced that it would be publishing Reilly's second novel, Bon Vivant, in April 2027.
