= Stuart McGugan =

Scottish actor

- Born: 2 March 1944 (age 82); Stirling, Stirlingshire, Scotland
- Occupations: Actor, TV presenter
- Years active: 1966–present
- Known for: It Ain't Half Hot Mum (1974–1981); Play School (1975–1986)

Stuart McGugan (born 2 March 1944) is a Scottish actor and television presenter. He is best known for the role of Gunner 'Atlas' Mackintosh in It Ain't Half Hot Mum and for being a presenter on the children's show Play School.

== Early life ==
McGugan was born in Stirling and raised in Letham and Westmuir. He attended Forfar Academy, and after being kicked out got his first job was as a reporter for Kirriemuir Herald. McGugan had a life long love for drama, having performed stage shows when in boy scouts, and tried to apply to enter Royal Scottish Academy of Music and Drama when he was sixteen, but was denied due to lack of money and because of his gap in education from being kicked out of school. He re-applied a few years later and was accepted, graduating in 1965. McGugan joined Royal Shakespeare Company and National Theatre of Scotland.

== Career ==
In the 1970s, McGugan worked in a Repertory theatre in Leeds when he got a phone call from his agent that Jimmy Perry and David Croft wanted to see him; he was doing eight shows a week so went to see them at a rehearsal room in London owned by the BBC. He was interviewed by an executive, while Perry and Croft were finishing rehearsing for an episode of Dad's Army, and went back up to Leeds for a show. He heard nothing else until around Christmas 1973 when he was asked to come down to film for a pilot episode of It Ain't Half Hot Mum; fortunately McGugan just so happened to have booked ten days off work and so went down to London to film it. McGugan landed the role of Gunner 'Atlas' Mackintosh in It Ain't Half Hot Mum for fifty-six episodes from 1974 to 1981.

McGugan was a presenter on BBC's Play School from 1975; he regularly presented the programme for more than 10 years. He played Bomba MacAteer in the 1987 series Tutti Frutti. McGugan appeared as Gordon Stewart in two series of the London Weekend Television (LWT) series Wish Me Luck between 1988 and 1989, in The Chief as Chief Superintendent Sean McCloud from 1993 to 1994, then in the mid-1990s was the pub owner Barney Meldrum in BBC Scotland's Hamish MacBeth. He had a recurring role as a factory worker in the Perry/Croft sitcom You Rang, M'Lord?. McGugan made his film debut in 1996 in an uncredited role as a taxi driver in Trainspotting.

He played the character Derek Simpson in Family Affairs in 1997. McGugan was in a Middle Ground Theatre Company tour of a stage adaptation of the 1960 film Tunes of Glory; McGugan played Colonel Jock Sinclair, originally played by Alec Guinness in the film. The production visited Jersey, Wolverhampton and Perth, Scotland in early 2007.

== Personal life ==
McGugan was married to his first wife, Annie Long, from 1970 to 1982. He met his second wife, Cordelia Monsey, in 1981 and started a relationship after his divorce, and married on New Year's Eve 2018. They have a child, Mitch (born 1988/1989), who is a classically trained violinst and heavy metal drummer who plays in the band Karybdis.

== Filmography ==
=== Film ===
Year	Title	Role	Notes
1996	Trainspotting	Taxi driver	Uncredited
2012	The Echoes of Empire	Various roles	
2014	Gustaf	The voice of reason	Voice only, short film
2017	The Fitzroy	Captain Hunt	
2018	Playing Dead	Alfie	

=== Television ===
Year	Title	Role	Notes
1966	This Man Craig	Micheal Dunn	One episode
1967	The Revenue Men	Boy	One episode
1971	The View from Daniel Pike	Bell	One episode
1972	Madame Sin	Sailor	One episode
1972	Man of Straw	Major Fox	Two episodes
1972	Thirty-Minute Theatre		One episode
1973	Scotch on the Rocks	First policeman	One episode
1974—1981	It Ain't Half Hot Mum	Gunner 'Atlas' MacKintosh	Fifty-six episodes
1975	Anne of Avonlea	Billy Gillis	One episode
1975	Churchill's People	Auchinlech	One episode
1975	Six Days of Justice	P.C. Rankin	One episode
1975	Oil Strike North	Allan Miller	One episode
1975	The Sweeney	Hicks	One episode
1975—1986	Play School	Himself	Two hundred and seventy six episodes
1976	Beasts	Jimmy Beattie	One episode
1976—1995	This is Your Life	Himself	Two episodes
1977	Rob Roy	Thorncliffe	Two episodes
1977	Dad's Army	The Scottish Sargent	One episode
1978—1982	Record Breakers	Himself	Five episodes
1979	Sykes	Jack	One episode
1979	The Mourning Brooch	Samson	Two episodes
1980	Star Turn	Himself	Two episodes
1980—1981	Play Away	Himself	Three episodes
1982	Grey Granite	Jim Trease	Two episodes
1984	Aladdin and the Forty Thieves	Thief	Television film
1984	The Brief	Chief Supt. Mackay	One episode
	The Cannon and Ball Show	Himself	One episode
1985	Oscar	Warden at Pentonville	One episode
1985	Operation Julie	D.S. Ron Staples	Television film
1985	The Personal Touch	John	Television film
1986	Comrade Dad	Telephone Installer	One episode
1986	The Sunday Premiere	Hotel guest	One episode
1986	The Happy Valley	Hotel Guest	Television film
1987	Tutti Frutti	Bomba MacAteer	Six episodes
1988	Floodtide	Det. Sgt. Marks	Two episodes
1988	The Management	Inspector MacKintosh	Two episodes
1988	Taggart	Walter Fairley	Three episodes
1989—1990	Wish Me Luck	Gordon Stewart	Eleven episodes
1990—1993	You Rang, M'Lord?	Jock Macgregor	Five episodes
1991	Spender	Alfie	One episode
1991	Uncle Jack and the Loch Noch Monster	Robert	Five episodes
1991—2007	The Bill	Various	Five episodes
1992—1994	The Chief	Sean McCloud	Thirteen episodes
1993	Brookside	Psychiatrist	One episode
1993	Strathblair	Grant	Two episodes
1995—1997	Hamish Macbeth	Barney Meldrum	Ninteteen episodes
1996	Some Kind of Life	Stuart Browning	
1997	Dalziel and Pascoe	Inspector Cruickshank	One episode
1999—2000	Mike and Angelo	Derek Frost	Two episodes
2000	The Creatives	Cameron	One episode
2000	Little Bird	Eddie Hughes Snr.	Television film
2001	Murphy's Law	Shopkeeper	Television film
2002	Heartbeat	Hemmings	One episode
2002	Casualty	Martin Davidson	One episode
2003	Rockface	Hotel receptionist	One episode
2003	Silent Witness	George Franks	One episode
2003	Footballers' Wives	Barry	Two episodes
2003—2010	Doctors	Harry McCree (2003), Pete Cameron (2010	Two episodes
2004	Family Affairs	Derek Simpson	Three episodes
2007	Comedy Connections	Himself	One episode
2009	Boy Meets Girl	Malcolm	Four episodes
2009	Benidorm	Wink McAndrew	One episode
2011	The Royal	Ken Letham	One episode
2011	Postcode	D. I. Flinn	Television film
2019	Pointless Celebrities	Himself	One episode, partnered with Melvyn Hayes
