= Michele Amas =

New Zealand actor and poet (1961–2016)

- Born: Michele Louise Amas; 8 October 1961; Dunedin, New Zealand
- Died: 26 December 2016 (aged 55); Wellington, New Zealand
- Occupations: Actress; Poet; Playwright
- Years active: 1980–2016
- Spouse: Ken Duncum
- Children: 1

Michele Louise Amas (8 October 1961 – 26 December 2016) was a New Zealand actress of stage, screen, television and radio, poet and playwright. She began writing poetry at age 10 and began her professional acting career in 1980. Amas wrote and directed the 2002 short film Redial which competed at the Venice Film Festival in the same year. and her first collection of poetry, After the Dance, published in 2006 was shortlisted for a Montana New Zealand Book Award and nominated for the 2008 Prize in Modern Letters. She earned a Chapman Tripp Theatre Award for her portrayal of Barbara in the 2011 play August: Osage County.

== Biography ==
Amas was born in Dunedin, New Zealand, on 8 October 1961. She was the daughter of Beth and Bruce Amas and had an older brother. Amas was brought up in Dunedin. She and attended Queen's High School, where she got inspiration to become a professional actress from her drama teacher. Amas began writing poetry when she was ten years old. She relocated to Wellington in 1982 and graduated from the drama school Toi Whakaari two years later. Amas had a cameo role as a horse in the 1980 British film The Elephant Man. In 1985, She portrayed Olwen as a young woman in the fourth and sixth episodes of the New Zealand television programme Heart of the High Country.

In 1991, Amas played Anna Cassar in the television series Shark in the Park and as a mother in the television programmes Christmas Shopping and Wonderful World. She was a cast member of the film I'm in Here two years later. Amas was Primose Iredale in the first episode of the 1995 television programme Mirror, Mirror. She portrayed the pathologist Jennifer Collins in three episodes of the 1990s television series Duggan from 1997 to 1999. Amas researched for the role by consulting several pathologists and learnt more women were becoming pathologists. She earned a nomination for Best Supporting Actress for her role in the series in 2000. From 1997 to 1998, Amas played Ruby in the television series The Enid Blyton Secret Series.

She played the part of the shy and nervous Fleur in the 2001 comedy play Take A Chance On Me by Roger Hall. That same year, Amas acted in the short film Sox and was the narrator of the television programme Tutus & Town Halls. She went on to direct and write the 2002 short film Redial, which competed at the 59th Venice International Film Festival held in the same year. Amas finished a master's degree in creative writing at Victoria University of Wellington in 2005. Her poem collection, The Angle of Clouds, won Amas the annual Adam Foundation Prize in Creative Writing for the best portfolio at Victoria University's master's degree course in creative writing. Amas portrayed Lauren in two seasons of the mid-2000s television programme Seven Periods with Mr Gormsby and Kate McKenzie in Holly's Heroes.

In 2006, her first collection of poetry, After the Dance, was published. It was shortlisted for the NZSA Jessie McKay Award as the Best First Book of Poetry Award at the Montana New Zealand Book Awards (today the Ockham New Zealand Book Awards) and was nominated for the 2008 Prize in Modern Letters. Amas played the part of Barbara in August: Osage County at Circa Theatre in 2011. The performance earned her a Chapman Tripp Theatre Award. Amas subsequently became a playwright, authoring the full-length theatre programme Goldilocks and the Three Bears staged by Kidzstuff Theatre for Children in 2012 and the 2013 pantomime Mother Goose held at Circa Theatre. She wrote the 2014 comedy-drama play The Pink Hammer, and voiced many plays on Radio New Zealand as well as children's stories and readings throughout her career.

== Personal life ==
She was married to the playwright Ken Duncum. She had one child. On 26 December 2016, Amas died in Wellington following a long period of time with cancer. Her funeral took place at All Saints Church on the afternoon of 30 December 2016, in Hataitai, Wellington.

== Approach ==
Bill Manhire, the Victoria University Institute of Modern Letters founding director, said of Amas' poetry: "Her poems have a domestic focus, and are full of wit and thoughtfulness and tenderness, and - as you'd expect from someone with her theatre background – they have perfect pitch and perfect timing." New Zealand Poetry Shelf's Paula Green added: "There is a tenderness, a maternal cord that feeds the poems and ignites every mother cell in your body as you read." Actor Ray Henwood commented on Amas' acting style: "She was able to pick up a character immediately and absorb it from the very first rehearsal."
