= Marooned (1994 film) =

1994 short film

Marooned is a 1994 short film directed by Jonas Grimås and starring Robert Carlyle, Stevan Rimkus and Liza Walker. The film centres around Peter Camaron (Carlyle) who works at Left Luggage at a train station.

== Cast ==
Robert Carlyle as Peter Camaron

Stevan Rimkus as Craig

Liza Walker as Claire

== Filming ==
The train station scenes were filmed at Glasgow Central station.
