= Hamish Macbeth (TV series) =

Scottish television series

- Genre: Police procedural Mystery; Comedy drama
- Written by: Daniel Boyle
- Directed by: Nicholas Renton
- Starring: Robert Carlyle; Ralph Riach; Shirley Henderson; Valerie Gogan; Barbara Rafferty; Stuart McGugan; Anne Lacey; Brian Pettifer; Duncan Duff; Jimmy Yuill; Billy Riddoch; Stuart Davids; David Ashton; John Grieve
- Country of origin: United Kingdom
- Original language: English
- No. of series: 3
- No. of episodes: 20

Production
- Executive producers: Trevor Davies; Scott Meek; Andrea Calderwood
- Producers: Deidre Keir; Charles Salmon
- Production location: Scotland
- Running time: 50 minutes
- Production company: Zenith Entertainment

Original release
- Network: BBC1
- Release: 26 March 1995 – 4 May 1997

Hamish Macbeth is a Scottish mystery comedy-drama television series produced by BBC Scotland that aired from 26 March 1995 to 4 May 1997. It is loosely based on a series of mystery novels by M. C. Beaton (Marion Chesney). The series concerns a local police officer, Constable Hamish Macbeth, in the fictitious town of Lochdubh on the west coast of Scotland. The title character was played by Robert Carlyle. It consisted of three series, with the first two series containing six episodes and the third containing eight.

The series was released on DVD in the United Kingdom and the United States in 2005 and 2006 respectively, with the exception of the first series episode ‘West Coast Story’. This was due to rights issues surrounding the episode's extensive use of songs and play elements from West Side Story.

In September 2023 the series was made permanently available on BBC iPlayer.

== Synopsis ==
Hamish Macbeth, a police constable in the Northern Constabulary, accompanied by his dog, a West Highland Terrier named Wee Jock, keeps the peace in the small town of Lochdubh. He does so without great reliance on the letter of the law and with every intention of avoiding being promoted out of what is his ideal job. He strongly dislikes involvement from Inverness police, and sometimes his intention does not seem to be to capture local petty criminals but to keep them away from prison and penalties.

The major running theme of the series is the tension caused by Hamish's attraction to both the journalist of the local newspaper, Isobel Sutherland, and the aristocratic author Alexandra Maclean. Other themes include the clairvoyance of Hamish's friend and co-worker "TV John" McIver, the not-so-secret romance between the school-teacher Esme Murray and the shopkeeper Rory Campbell, the volatile marriage of the publican Barney Meldrum and his wife Agnes, the schemes of the two Lachie MacCraes, father and son, the laid-back, pipe-smoking Doc Brown, and Major Peregrine Maclean, father of Alexandra and penniless aristocratic widower.

The series was accompanied by the Gaelic music of John Lunn.

== Production ==
The series was filmed on location in the village of Plockton, the larger port village of Kyle of Lochalsh and the surrounding area. A map of the Lochdubh area shown in the episode ‘In Search of a Rose’ places Lochdubh close to Toscaig, just to the north of Kyle of Lochalsh, with Lochdubh Island being part of the Crowlin Islands.

The series was directed mainly by Nicholas Renton, with Mandie Fletcher directing four episodes and Jonas Grimas directing two episodes in 1997.

== Cast ==
- Robert Carlyle as PC Hamish Macbeth; A policeman in the village of Lochdubh, laid-back in dealing with the inhabitants' quirky ways. He works to avoid promotion or transfer (often by letting others take credit for any of his successful policework) and is clearly more interested in keeping the peace than enforcing the letter of the law.
- Ralph Riach as John James McIver, known as "TV John"; Hamish's lanky older friend and confidant—almost a father figure—who got his nickname because he was the first man in Lochdubh to have a television set. He's Hamish's civilian assistant, manning the station when Hamish is away and keeping the station in order, cooking Hamish's meals and so forth. TV John is also gifted with the sight.
- Shirley Henderson as Isobel Sutherland; A reporter on The Lochdubh Listener who is in love with Hamish. Hamish later realises his love for her, but their relationship remains largely unrequited. She temporarily left Lochdubh for a job in Glasgow, but later returns and starts a relationship with Hamish.
- Valerie Gogan as Alexandra "Alex" Maclean (Series 1–2); Major Maclean's daughter, a novelist who has an on/off relationship with Hamish. She breaks up with Hamish after discovering that he no longer has feelings for her, and is actually in love with Isobel. She then attempts to leave Lochdubh, but falls down a muddy cliff and dies.
- Barbara Rafferty as Agnes Meldrum; a landlady who runs the local pub with her husband, Barney. It is later revealed that when she was 16, she had a son named Gavin, whom she gave up for adoption. He later reunites with her.
- Stuart McGugan as Bernard Keir Hardy "Barney" Meldrum; the local publican, an "incomer" from Glasgow. He also runs boat tours of the loch.
- Anne Lacey as Esme Murray; The local teacher and owner of the boarding house.
- Brian Pettifer as Rory Duncan Campbell; Owner of the local grocery shop, and a "very close friend" of Esme. Due to his nervous disposition and somewhat strait-laced nature, he tries to keep their relationship a secret—with very little success.
- Duncan Duff as Dougal Alexander Fleming Brown, AKA "Doc"; The kilt-wearing, pipe-smoking, fairly young village doctor, who appears to smoke quantities of marijuana.
- Jimmy Yuill/Billy Riddoch as Lachlan McCrae, Sr.; A local schemer who does odd jobs of sometimes dubious legality, most often relying on the making of unlicensed sausages or other foodstuffs for his income. Despite his (generally unsuccessful) quasi-criminal escapades, Lachlan also does legitimate repair work and is treated with respect by the rest of the town.
- Stuart Davids as Lachlan McCrae, Jr; "Lachie Junior" is uneducated and somewhat dim, but is friendly and generally well liked. He starts out working with his father as an all-purpose (if somewhat inept) assistant, but ends up rising considerably in status when he becomes the local undertaker.
- David Ashton as Major Roderick Peregrine ("Roddy") Maclean; Alex's father, local landowner and former army officer. A major figure in the town in terms of social standing, although he's virtually penniless.
- Zippy as Wee Jock; Hamish's dog. After Wee Jock dies, he is replaced by another dog named simply "Jock".

=== Recurring characters ===
- Jon Croft as Malkie Clunie (Series 1); The Major's groundsman and gamekeeper.
- Mona Bruce as Edith ("Edie") (Series 3); The Major's housekeeper.
- Dolina MacLennan as Flora (Series 1–2); The secretary and receptionist at the local newspaper office, and prolific knitter.
- Iain McColl as Neil (Series 2–3); Operator of the local omnibus and the small, unstaffed local railway station.
- Ronnie Letham as Peter (Series 2–3); Station Officer at the local fire station, which is run by trained locals.
- Ron Donachie as Zoot McPherrin (Series 1–2); Leader of a hippie colony, with various Lochdubh associations.
- Laurie Ventry as Reverend Alan Snow (Series 2); Local clergyman of undisclosed denomination.
- Bill Leadbitter as D.I. Willie Bruce (Series 1); Hamish's superior from the Inverness police force.
- Alex Norton as Duncan Soutar (Series 1–2); Local farmer.
- Rab Christie as Jimmy Soutar (Series 1–2); Duncan Soutar's son.
- Sandy McDade as Jean Foley (Series 3); A friend of Isobel's, who along with her nephew, Frankie, leaves Glasgow to stay in Lochdubh.
- Stephen Henderson as Frankie Bryce (Series 3); Jean's nephew, who comes with her and Isobel to stay in Lochdubh.

== Episodes ==
=== Series overview ===
Series	Episodes	Originally released	
Series	Episodes	First released	Last released
1	6	26 March 1995	30 April 1995
2	6	24 March 1996	28 April 1996
3	8	16 March 1997	4 May 1997

=== Series 1 (1995) ===
No. overall	No. in series	Title	Directed by	Written by	Original release date
1	1	"The Great Lochdubh Salt Robbery"	Nicholas Renton	Daniel Boyle	26 March 1995
Hamish has his hands full dealing with two cases – a salt theft from a local grocery store, and the disappearance of the local wife abuser, Geordie Robb.
2	2	"A Pillar of the Community"	Nicholas Renton	Stuart Hepburn	2 April 1995
Hamish is asked to keep the peace when tensions arise as a newcomer, Vicky Jeffreys, tries to teach the villagers about their own "traditional" heritage and takes over events at the Lochdubh day celebrations.
3	3	"The Big Freeze"	Patrick Lau	Dominic Minghella	9 April 1995
Hamish investigates a burglary at Major Maclean's residence, but suspects he is faking the incident to claim the insurance money. However, DI Bruce is determined to catch a gang he suspects are responsible.
4	4	"West Coast Story"	Ian Knox	Brian Elsley	16 April 1995
Hamish sets out to expose the poor dealings of local bank manager Cameron Dicks, who seeks to bankrupt Duncan Soutar. When Hamish's cheques also bounce, he joins the village production of West Side Story.
5	5	"Wee Jock's Lament"	Nicholas Renton	Daniel Boyle	23 April 1995
Hamish tries to track down two escaped convicts who he believes ran over and killed his dog Wee Jock. Suspecting his actions may result in murder, the townsfolk set out to find him before he reaches boiling point.
6	6	"A Bit of an Epic"	Sid Roberson	Julian Spilsbury	30 April 1995
Hamish decides to join a famous tour guide on a mountain trek through the steep Scottish hillsides, with a party of inexperienced English office workers, suspecting that trouble may arise. When he is led into a dangerous situation, his fears are proven correct.

=== Series 2 (1996) ===
No. overall	No. in series	Title	Directed by	Written by	Original release date
7	1	"A Perfectly Simple Explanation"	Nicholas Renton	Daniel Boyle	24 March 1996
Hamish is branded a devil by a religious group who claim that Lochdubh is the new Gomorrah. His initial disdain turns to concern for head of the Church of the Stony Path, Malachi MacBean, whose behaviour continues to become more erratic.
8	2	"In Search of a Rose"	Mandie Fletcher	Stuart Hepburn	31 March 1996
Hamish investigates the disappearance of a local seafarer. Barney Meldrum opens a new visitor attraction – a whale-watching expedition – in the village.
9	3	"Isobel Pulls it Off"	Mandie Fletcher	Dominic Minghella	7 April 1996
Hamish becomes jealous when Isobel breaks a big story with the local newspaper, and finds a new boyfriend, Gary. Hamish's jealously turns to fear when he suspects that Gary may be leading Isobel into the path of some serious trouble.
10	4	"Radio Lochdubh"	Nicholas Renton	Daniel Boyle	14 April 1996
Hamish is ordered to close down a popular local pirate radio station by two radio detection officers, but faces backlash from the locals. Meanwhile, his personal life takes a turn for the worse when he breaks up with Alex, but his decision soon leads to tragedy.
11	5	"No Man is an Island"	Nicholas Renton	Daniel Boyle	21 April 1996
Hamish takes off to a remote island following Alex's death, but ends up having to rescue an elderly woman, Belle, who discovers the remains of an unexploded landmine. Meanwhile, Hamish's replacement, PC Duggan, begins to offend the locals.
12	6	"The Lochdubh Deluxe"	Nicholas Renton	Daniel Boyle	28 April 1996
Hamish has to intervene in a family feud, and investigates the disappearance of a body from the local burial ground. Lachie Jr. is asked to become the new assistant to the undertaker, who has become tired of his nephew's behaviour.

=== Series 3 (1997) ===
No. overall	No. in series	Title	Directed by	Written by	Original release date
13	1	"The Honourable Policeman"	Jonas Grimås	Daniel Boyle	16 March 1997
Hamish is invited to be the best man at the local laird's wedding, but suspects the laird's fiancée may be harbouring an ulterior motive for wanting to marry. Meanwhile, Hamish is forced to train a new woman police constable, Anne Patterson.
14	2	"Deferred Sentence"	Nicholas Renton	Daniel Boyle	23 March 1997
Hamish investigates a twenty-year-old mystery which has divided the island of Lagga-Laggas, whilst trying to avoid becoming embroiled in the rivalry between Father McPhail and his adversary, Enoch McDuff.
15	3	"The Lochdubh Assassin"	Nicholas Renton	Daniel Boyle	30 March 1997
Hamish must protect the village from a gang of ruthless villains who follow Isobel back from Glasgow, but he has a particularly difficult time keeping them under control – as they have yet to commit a crime.
16	4	"The Good Thief"	Jonas Grimås	Daniel Boyle	6 April 1997
Hamish has to uncover the secret of Frankie's best friend from Glasgow, Tusker Gray, who threatens to ruin the annual singing contest between Lochdubh Stag Bar and the Dunbracken Arms.
17	5	"The Trouble with Rory"	Mandie Fletcher	Stuart Hepburn	13 April 1997
Hamish investigates a fire at the local primary school, which destroys part of the building. Esme is shocked when the council decide not to rebuild, but is even more disgusted when she discovers her boyfriend Rory may be connected.
18	6	"More Than a Game"	Mandie Fletcher	Stuart Hepburn	20 April 1997
Hamish suspects that there may be cheating at the annual shinty match against Dunbracken, but the relationship breakdown between Lachie Jr. and his father threatens to overshadow the entire game.
19	7	"Destiny (part 1)"	Nicholas Renton	Daniel Boyle	27 April 1997
Hamish is forced to uncover the location of the Stone of Destiny after John's criminal brother, Kenneth McIver, is sprung from an American jail, and returns to Lochdubh in search of the priceless artifact.
20	8	"Destiny (part 2)"	Nicholas Renton	Daniel Boyle	4 May 1997
Hamish and friends trek across the mountains to rescue John after Ava and Kenneth manage to steal the Stone of Destiny. But while Hamish and Isobel's relationship begins to blossom, John's fate proves to be much darker.

== Home media ==
All home media versions omit Series 1, Episode 4 ("West Coast Story"), due to music rights clearance issues.

- Region 1: All three series have been released on DVD in Region 1 from October 25, 2005, to October 23, 2007.
- Region 2: All three series have been released on DVD in Region 2 from September 5, 2005, to April 24, 2006.
- Region 4: All three series have been released on DVD in Region 4 from March 21, 2006, to February 7, 2007.

DVD Releases
Season	Region 1	Region 2	Region 4
Season 1	October 25, 2005	September 5, 2005	March 21, 2006
Season 2	October 24, 2006	January 23, 2006	September 7, 2006
Season 3	October 23, 2007	April 24, 2006	February 7, 2007
Seasons 1-3	October 23, 2007	October 2, 2006	October 3, 2007

== See also ==
British sitcom
