= Annaleese Jochems =

New Zealand writer

- Born: 1994 (age 31–32); Whangārei, New Zealand
- Education: MA, International Institute of Modern Letters (2016)
- Occupations: Author; bookseller
- Writing career
- Notable work: Baby (2017)

Annaleese Jochems (born 1994) is a New Zealand author and bookseller. Her debut novel Baby (2017) won the Adam Foundation Prize in Creative Writing and the Hubert Church Best First Book Award for Fiction at the Ockham New Zealand Book Awards.

== Life and career ==
Jochems was born in Whangārei in 1994, and grew up on a farm in Pakaraka. Her father is a beef farmer and her mother is a teacher, and she has two younger brothers. She has said she decided to become a writer when she was 14.

Jochems studied creative writing, first at the Manukau Institute of Technology and subsequently at the International Institute of Modern Letters where she completed a Master of Arts. She was the recipient of the Adam Foundation Prize in Creative Writing in 2016 for her draft manuscript, which was published as Baby by Victoria University Press in 2017.

Baby is about a young woman who steals her father's money and runs away with her female personal trainer; the two purchase a boat named Baby. Jochems has said that the novel was inspired by criticism of Fifty Shades of Grey and a desire to subvert stereotypical gender dynamics, as well as by her inability to find a job and a feeling of being "surplus" to society. Fellow New Zealand author Eleanor Catton has described the book as "sultry, sinister, hilarious, and demented". The Guardian described the novel's main character, Cynthia, as "a memorable addition to the growing coterie of unapologetic antiheroines (dis)gracing the pages of contemporary fiction".

In 2018 Baby was shortlisted for the top fiction award at the Ockham New Zealand Book Awards, and received the Hubert Church Award for the best first book. It was also longlisted for the Ngaio Marsh Award for best crime novel. The film rights were acquired by Wild Card Films in 2018, and Scribe published the novel in the UK and United States in 2019.

In June 2018 Jochems and her mother opened a secondhand bookshop called Book Hound in Newtown.
