= Jonas Grimås =

Swedish director (born 1958)

- Born: Jonas Kristofer Ulfson Grimås; 7 August 1958 (age 67); Uppsala, Sweden
- Occupations: Film & television director
- Years active: 1988–present
- Website: jonasgrimas.com

Jonas Grimås (born 7 August 1958) is a Swedish film and television director, based in London since 1988. He was educated at the Dramatiska Institutet in Stockholm, and then the Royal College of Art in London.

In 1988 he won the BAFTA Film Award for best short film with Artisten. He was also nominated in 1995 for best short film with Marooned. In 2011 he was named "Cultural Personality of the Year" by the StockholmsKultur Foundation.

Grimås started out working on Swedish soap-operas, but has made a name for himself making British crime dramas. He was a regular contributor to ITV’s Heartbeat, having directed 30 episodes. He has also directed episodes of Hamish Macbeth, Silent Witness, and Second Sight: Kingdom of the Blind starring Clive Owen. While based in London he has also taken on Swedish projects, directing two episodes of the TV series Wallander, and the adaptations of two Camilla Läckberg novels Predikanten ("The Preacher") and Isprinsessan ("The Ice Princess").
