= Ronnie Letham =

Scottish actor (1949–2008)

- Born: Dugald Ronald Letham; 10 September 1949; Falkirk, Stirlingshire, Scotland
- Died: 27 March 2008 (aged 58); Falkirk, Scotland
- Occupation: Actor
- Years active: 1967–2008

Dugald Ronald Letham (10 September 1949 – 27 March 2008) was a Scottish actor.

== Early life and education ==
Letham was born in Falkirk, Stirlingshire, on 10 September 1949. He had a sister, Maggie, and attended Bantaskine, then Falkirk High School.

Letham originally trained as a teacher at Jordanhill College, Glasgow, before enrolling at the Royal Scottish Academy of Music and Drama.

== Career ==
Letham performed at the Traverse Theatre in Edinburgh, the Royal National Theatre in London, the Odeon Theatre in Glasgow and the Glasgow King's Theatre.

His early television appearances in shows such as Crown Court, Play for Today and The Sweeney gained Letham recognition among television writers and producers. He played Rab B. Nesbitt, father of the eponymous lead character, in a 1996 episode of Rab C. Nesbitt.

Letham had recurring roles in television shows Atletico Partick as Gazza, Hamish Macbeth as Peter the Fireman and Ain't Misbehavin' as Snowy McGraw. He also made three separate appearances on both Taggart and The Bill, playing a different character on each occasion. His final role was as Harry, Isa's estranged husband, in the sitcom Still Game. He appeared in three episodes between 2002 and 2006, when his character was killed off.

== Death ==
Letham died from complications following a fall in Falkirk on 27 March 2008, at the age of 58.

== See also ==
- List of Scottish actors
