= This Man Craig =

British drama television series (1966-1967)

This Man Craig is a television drama series produced by BBC Scotland and screened over fifty-two episodes in 1966 and 1967. It was set in a secondary school in the fictional Scottish town of Strathaird. Episodes were filmed at Glasgow’s Bellahouston Academy and Knightswood Secondary School. The series dealt with the everyday issues affecting both staff and pupils at Strathaird School, and in particular the title character, idealistic science teacher and housemaster Ian Craig (played by John Cairney).

The first series was shown over 26 episodes between January 7, 1966 and July 1, 1966. The second series was shown over twenty-six episodes between September 17, 1966 and March 21, 1967. Only two episodes are known to be still in existence in the BBC Archives. The opening sequence showed Ian Craig driving over the newly-bulit Forth Road Bridge.

Only two episodes ("Dougie" and "The Time Wasters") are known to exist.

== Main cast ==
- John Cairney as Ian Craig
- Ellen McIntosh as Margaret Craig
- Brian Pettifer as James Craig
- Alex McCrindle as Willie Sinclair
- Leonard Maguire as Mr Robertson
- Joan Alcorn as Katie Duncan

== List of episodes ==
Almost all episodes are missing, except when indicated:

=== Season One ===
- With Luv from Rosie
- Patterson
- The Search
- A Wise Father
- Dougie (exists)
- Girl in a Thousand
- Three's Company
- Live Like a Man
- A Lower Deep
- Sticks and Stones
- Big Fall
- The Bike
- Time For Protest
- The Key to it All
- Tall, Fat and Ugly
- A Rough Passage
- The Expedition
- The Romantic
- Certain Standards
- Two Thousand a Year
- A Question of Biology
- Mates
- The Rubbing Rag
- Whose Pigeon?
- The Golden Key to Knowledge
- Old Flame

=== Season Two ===
- The Day Before School
- Early Days
- The Time Wasters (exists; recovered in 2014)
- Swimmer in a Shallow Cup
- The Trolls
- Surgery
- Period of Adjustment
- The Good Chemist
- Sons of McCall
- Nurinder
- What Made Sammy?
- I
- Fresh Off the Boat
- The Pirate Cut
- Pressures
- The Water Baby
- The Tinks
- Then There Were Nine
- There's Got to be a Fire Somewhere
- You Can Choose Your Friends
- Stevie
- The Day's Run
- Chris and the Wheelbarrow
- Another School of Thought
- The Moffatt Foundation
- Two by Two
