= Alec Heggie =

Scottish actor (1944–2022)

Alexander Angus Heggie (19 January 1944 – 2 July 2022) was a Scottish actor who was known for roles in the BBC Scotland series The Haggard Falcon (1974) and his long-running part as Lachie McIvor in the soap opera High Road.

== Early life and education ==
Born in Perth, Scotland, Heggie was the son of Alexander "Sandy" Heggie, an electrical sales worker, and Rita (née Margaret McCulloch), a domestic assistant. After completing his education at Perth High School, Heggie worked at a grocer and later at a wire company. During this time, he joined an amateur dramatic society, which inspired him to pursue acting professionally. He received a scholarship to the Royal Scottish Academy of Music and Drama in Glasgow.

== Career ==
Heggie's career began in theatre, with notable work at the Nottingham Playhouse, the Pitlochry Festival Theatre, and the Young Lyceum Company in Edinburgh. In London, he performed at the Royal Court and the Young Vic, where in 1971 he appeared in Robert Shaw's play Cato Street alongside Vanessa Redgrave and Bob Hoskins. An oft-recounted anecdote from his time at the Young Lyceum involved a production of Hamlet, where his unscripted, humorous observation during a dramatic scene caused his fellow actors to break character.

Heggie later transitioned to television. His appearances included playing Bothwell in The Haggard Falcon (1974), John Shand in a 1978 adaptation of What Every Woman Knows, and roles in Cloud Howe (1982) and Rab C. Nesbitt (1992–97). His most enduring television role was as Lachie McIvor in Scottish Television's High Road (formerly Take the High Road), which he joined for its final five years. His character's wedding was a central plot point in the show's final episode in 2003.

== Personal life ==
Heggie married Jenny Maule in 1975, whom he met while she was working as a personal assistant at Perth Theatre. They had two children: a daughter, Joanne, who died in infancy, and a son, Jonathan.
