= Murder Rooms: Mysteries of the Real Sherlock Holmes =

- Genre: Crime drama
- Created by: David Pirie
- Starring: Ian Richardson; Robin Laing; Charles Edwards; Simon Chandler; Mossie Smith; Ben Macleod; Dolly Wells; Charles Dance
- Composer: John Lunn
- Country of origin: United Kingdom
- Original language: English
- No. of episodes: 6

Production
- Executive producers: Rebecca Eaton; Jim Reeve
- Producers: Alison Jackson; Ian Madden
- Running time: 90 minutes
- Production company: WGBH Boston

Original release
- Network: BBC Two; BBC One
- Release: 4 January 2000 – 2 October 2001

Murder Rooms: Mysteries of the Real Sherlock Holmes is a television crime drama series created by David Pirie, and co-produced by the BBC and WGBH Boston, a PBS station. Six episodes were made and were first broadcast on BBC Two, the first two on 4 and 5 January 2000, and the other four from 4 September to 2 October 2001.

== Plot ==
The series follows Sir Arthur Conan Doyle's time as a general practitioner in Southsea, solving mysteries with the help of his mentor, Dr Joseph Bell, who is based in Edinburgh. The series stars Ian Richardson as Dr Joseph Bell, alongside Robin Laing and later Charles Edwards as Sir Arthur Conan Doyle.

== Cast ==
- Robin Laing as Sir Arthur Conan Doyle (in "The Dark Beginnings of Sherlock Holmes" only)
- Charles Edwards as Sir Arthur Conan Doyle (in the remaining four episodes)
- Ian Richardson as Dr Joseph Bell
- Simon Chandler as Inspector Warner
- Mossie Smith as Mrs Williams
- Ben Macleod as Innes Doyle
- Dolly Wells as Elspeth Scott
- Charles Dance as Sir Henry Carlyle

== Production ==
=== Development ===
The series was inspired by Sir Arthur Conan Doyle's choice to base the character of Sherlock Holmes on Dr Joseph Bell, who had been his tutor at the University of Edinburgh and occasionally worked as a forensic expert for the Edinburgh Police. The series exaggerated the similarities between Bell and Holmes for dramatic effect, with Doyle acting much as Doctor Watson acts in Doyle's stories, and included several scenes from the books, the implication being that these inspire Doyle's fiction.

=== Writing ===
One of the most notable references to Sherlock Holmes is a version of a scene in The Sign of Four in which Holmes deduces that a pocket watch provided by Watson was formerly owned by a drunkard, upon which a furious Watson believes that Holmes has callously acquired information about his unfortunate brother, to whom the watch had belonged, for the sake of a cheap trick. The series' version of the scene has Bell deduce the mental state of Doyle's father, inspiring much the same reaction. (This scene also appears in the otherwise unrelated drama The Strange Case of Arthur Conan Doyle, also by David Pirie.)

David Pirie also wrote three novels related to the series: The Patient's Eyes, The Night Calls and The Dark Water.

=== Filming ===
The series was filmed in Scotland and Cromer, Norfolk.

In Edinburgh Moray Place was used for the first episode, as well as Bakehouse Close, Acheson House, Heriots School and Seacliff Beach. The cloisters of the University of Glasgow doubled as part of the University of Edinburgh.

=== Casting ===
Ian Richardson had earlier played Sherlock Holmes in television adaptations of The Hound of the Baskervilles and The Sign of Four.

== Episodes ==
=== Pilot (2000) ===
The pilot, also sometimes referred to as a "Christmas Special", was first broadcast in two parts on BBC Two. On 24 March 2003 the pilot was released on a DVD on which the two parts were edited into a single 100-minute film, removing more than 20 minutes of footage from the original broadcast. The U.S. release of the DVD, for which the series was retitled Dr. Bell and Mr. Doyle, followed in 2006. It retains the original two-part format.

No.	Title	Directed by	Written by	Original release date	Viewers (millions)
1	"The Dark Beginnings of Sherlock Holmes: Part 1" "Dr. Bell and Mr. Doyle: Part 1 (U.S. Title)"	Paul Seed	David Pirie	4 January 2000	4.31
Following the "death" of Sherlock Holmes Doyle finds himself reflecting on his friendship with Dr Joseph Bell, as well as his long-ago romance with a fellow student, Elspeth Scott (Dolly Wells), the victim of a killer whom he and Bell failed to capture.
2	"The Dark Beginnings of Sherlock Holmes: Part 2" "Dr. Bell and Mr. Doyle: Part 2 (U.S. Title)"	Paul Seed	David Pirie	5 January 2000	4.27
When Elpseth's sister Lady Sarah Carlisle falls ill Doyle comes to believe that her husband, Sir Henry Carlisle, who is a Member of Parliament, may be behind some of the killings.

=== Series (2001) ===
After the pilot was critically acclaimed a series of four episodes was commissioned for BBC One. Although the response was initially positive, viewing figures quickly declined and the final episode of the series drew fewer than three million viewers. These episodes were released on DVD on 16 January 2012, but many fans criticised the decision to reduce the original 16:9 picture ratio to 4:3. The U.S. release, which first circulated in 2006, retains the original 16:9 picture format.

No.	Title	Directed by	Written by	Original release date	Viewers (millions)
3	"The Patient's Eyes"	Tim Fywell	David Pirie	4 September 2001	5.29
Doyle and Bell investigate the case of a woman who believes that she is being followed by an apparition of the man who killed her parents some years before, but Bell assures her that the killer was hanged many years ago and that there has to be another explanation.
4	"The Photographer's Chair"	Paul Marcus	Paul Billing	18 September 2001 (Note: This episode was originally scheduled to air on 11 September 2001, but was postponed due to news coverage of the September 11 attacks.)	N/A
Doyle and Bell investigate the deaths by strangling of two people whose bodies are found floating in a river. While Doyle finds himself captivated by spiritualism, Bell's suspicions lead him to a photographer who believes that he saw his wife's soul leave her body at the moment of death.
5	"The Kingdom of Bones"	Simon Langton	Stephen Gallagher	25 September 2001 (Note: This episode was originally scheduled to air on 18 September 2001, but was replaced by "The Photographer's Chair", which was postponed from the previous Tuesday.)	N/A
A museum curator hires Bell and Doyle to unwrap an Egyptian mummy, but they are surprised to discover that the body is that of a man who has been dead for only three weeks. The subsequent investigation uncovers a group of expatriate rebels plotting to create havoc.
6	"The White Knight Stratagem"	Paul Marcus	Daniel Boyle	2 October 2001	N/A
Bell helps the police to investigate the murder of a moneylender, but an old animosity between him and the officer in charge leads to conflict. Matters become worse when Doyle sees merit in the lieutenant's theories rather than in Bell's.

== Reception and cancellation ==
The series was produced by BBC Films, rather than the drama division. Following the conclusion of the four-episode series the decision was made not to recommission the series despite the critical acclaim for it. One BBC insider wryly commented that it was "too successful for the wrong department".
