= Valerie Gogan =

Scottish actress (born 1960)

- Born: Valerie Margaret Gogan; 5 October 1960 (age 66); Glasgow, Scotland
- Occupations: Film and television actress

Valerie Gogan (born 5 October 1960) is a Scottish actress. Gogan was born in Scotland and left Glasgow in the 1980s to train at LAMDA. She made her film debut in Dangerous Liaisons. She later starred in One More Kiss and Heart of the High Country, and had a major recurring role in the BBC series Hamish Macbeth. She is also known for principal roles in Waking the Dead, The Bill, Doctors as Beth Carlyle, Peak Practice and David Copperfield. On stage, she has worked with the Royal Shakespeare Company, the Royal National Theatre and in London's West End, appearing in, among others, A Doll's House, Les Liaisons Dangereuses, The Rehearsal and The Secret Rapture.

== Career ==
=== Film ===
Gogan made her film debut in Dangerous Liaisons(1988), playing opposite John Malkovich.

=== Television ===
Gogan had a major recurring role in the BBC Scotland series Hamish Macbeth opposite Robert Carlyle, playing Alexandra "Alex" Maclean, a novelist and on-and-off girlfriend of the title character, in its first two series She later appeared in Taggart, Casualty, The Bill, Waking the Dead, Doctors and Silent Witness

=== Stage ===
Gogan has worked on stage with the Royal Shakespeare Company and the National Theatre. Her credits listed on Theatricalia include Emilie in Les Liaisons Dangereuses and Gracielita in Worlds Apart for the Royal Shakespeare Company, Lucile in The Rehearsal at the Almeida Theatre, and a role in the National Theatre's He Who Saw Everything. She has worked with directors including Katie Mitchell, James MacDonald and Simon Usher.

=== Radio ===
She appeared in the BBC Radio 4 drama Rhoda and Pete Get Back On the Scene with Kenneth Cranham.
