= Anne Lacey =

Scottish actress

- Occupation: Actress
- Years active: 1985–present

Anne Lacey (born 1958) is a Scottish actress who has appeared in plays, television series, made-for-television movies, film shorts and radio drama since 1986. Her longest appearance run to date has been in 20 episodes of the TV series Hamish Macbeth from 1995 to 1997 as schoolteacher Esme Murray.

She trained in Scotland, France and Italy.

Her theatre work includes The Princess an the Puddok, The Pearl Fishers, Men Should Weep, The House with the Green Shutters, and The Cone Gatherers. She has worked with the Royal Shakespeare Company, Theatre Alba, the Dundee Repertory Theatre, the National Theatre of Scotland and the Oxford Stage Company.

Her work in film includes Harry Potter and the Goblet of Fire, My Life So Far, and Strictly Sinatra.

Her television work in addition to Hamish Macbeth includes Monarch of the Glen, Holby City, Doctor Finlay, and Rab C. Nesbitt.

== Theatre ==
Year	Title	Role	Company	Director	Notes
	I Didn't Always Live Here	Amie	Hilltop Theatre Company	John Ramage	play by Stewart Conn
1985	The Princess an the Puddok	The Queen	Theatre Alba	Charles Nowosielski	play by David Purves
1986	The Bothy: Tales, Songs, Traditions	Narrator	Netherbow Theatre, Edinburgh		compilation by Donald Smith
1987	Mary Queen of Scots Got Her Head Chopped Off	Mary	Communicado	Gerry Mulgrew	play by Liz Lochhead
1987	The Knicht o the Riddills	Queen Sheena	Brunton Theatre Company, Musselburgh	Charles Nowosielski	play by David Purves
1988	The Straw Chair	Lady Rachel	Traverse Theatre, Edinburgh	Jeremy Raison	play by Sue Glover
1989	The Guid Sisters	Therese Dubuc	Tron Theatre, Glasgow	Michael Boyd	play by Michel Tremblay, translated into Scots by Bill Findlay & Martin Bowman
1993	Bondagers	Maggie	Traverse Theatre, Edinburgh	Ian Brown	play by Sue Glover
2026	I'll Be Seeing You	Mother/Heidi	Pitlochry Festival Theatre	Alan Cumming	play by Martin Sherman

== Radio ==
Year	Title	Role	Producer	Station	Notes
1991	Carver	Marie de Guise	Stewart Conn	BBC Scotland, BBC Radio 3	play by John Purser
1997	The Secret Commonwealth	Lady Fyvie	Patrick Rayner	BBC Radio 4	play by John Purser
