= Scottish Community Drama Association =

Scottish association of amateur dramatic clubs

The Scottish Community Drama Association (SCDA) is an association of amateur dramatic clubs throughout Scotland. It was first founded in 1926. Amateur theatre companies in Scotland have generally presented repertoire in English, Lowland Scots and, more occasionally, Scottish Gaelic.

The SCDA was founded during the period of the Scottish Renaissance, a time of increasing calls to revive many of the cultural and political institutions in Scotland which were perceived as moribund at this period, including native theatre. Serious professional theatre in Scotland had more or less lapsed by the 1880s and the first twentieth century attempt to revive it faltered with the demise of Alfred Wareing's short-lived Glasgow Repertory Theatre (founded in 1909) which closed down on the outbreak of World War I. Its remaining funds were used in the early 1920s to found the amateur Scottish National Players with the goal to promote native theatre. During the interwar years all such initiatives had their origins in the amateur theatre movement, in particular Glasgow's Curtain Theatre (1932–39) founded by Grace Ballantyne, Scottish People's Theatre and Glasgow Unity.

No teaching institutions offered formal provision for training in Scottish styles of performance or diction until the establishment of the Glasgow College of Dramatic Art in 1950 (as part of the Royal Scottish Academy of Music). as a consequence, most of Scotland's ground-breaking mid-twentieth century native actors, such as Duncan Macrae, Roddy McMillan or Molly Urquhart, first developed their skills and methods through performance with the more innovative non-professional companies listed above. Similarly, native playwrights who wished to present authentic representations of Scottish life on the stage, such as Joe Corrie, Robert McLellan, John Brandane, Ena Lamont Stewart and others, first came to attention generally through amateur productions of their plays.

Lowland Scots playwrights in particular were well served by non-professional theatre at a time when voicing for professional actors in Britain was dictated by received pronunciation. Miscasting in professional productions of McLellan's Scots plays was a regular complaint for the playwright, often in contrast to amateur productions of his Scots in which actors without formal training gave sympathetic and authentic delivery of the language.

After James Bridie's establishment of the Citizens Theatre in 1942, Scotland finally began to develop a native professional theatre.

After the introduction of television during the 1950s, the number of amateur companies in Scotland, in common with the situation elsewhere, began to decline from its peak in the 1940s, but it still remains a vigorous part of Scottish cultural life.

The SCDA has maintained a successful annual one-act drama festival since its inception, with one interregnum of five years (1940–45) during the Second World War.

== Sources ==
- Barlow, Priscilla Wise Enough to Play the Fool (Edinburgh, 1995)
- Campbell, Donald Playing for Scotland: A History of the Scottish Stage, 1715-1965, (Edinburgh, 1996)
- Finlay, Bill A History of Scottish Theatre (Edinburgh, 1998)
- Hutchison, David The Modern Scottish Theatre, (Glasgow, 1977)
