= Alfred Wareing =

English actor-manager

Wareing, 1930s

Alfred John Wareing (26 October 1876 – 11 April 1942) was an English actor-manager. He was a pioneer of the repertory theatre in Britain and an authority on the plays of Shakespeare.

== Life and career ==
Wareing was born in Greenwich, London on 26 October, the son of Alfred Hooton Wareing and his wife Henrietta Helena, née Weil. He was educated at the John Roan School and Birkbeck College, London.

He made his first professional appearance on the stage at the St George's Hall, London 1894, with the Elizabethan Stage Society. Engagements followed with F. R. Benson, Maxine Elliott, George Alexander, Johnston Forbes-Robertson and others. In June 1899, he was one of the original members of the Stage Society. At Alexander's St James's Theatre in March 1902 he played Guarino in Paolo and Francesca. In 1904, he turned to management, bringing the Irish Players to London from the Abbey Theatre, Dublin. He was subsequently business manager for Herbert Beerbohm Tree's provincial productions, and for his personal tour (1906). In 1905, he married Gertrude Victoria Isabel Hawker. They had two daughters, one of whom was the actress Lesley Wareing. Between 1906 and 1908 he was general manager for Oscar Asche and Lily Brayton.

In 1909 Wareing founded the Glasgow Repertory Theatre, which he described as the first attempt to establish a citizen's theatre in Britain. Wareing found sufficient interest amongst Glasgow industrialists to provide the £1,000 he needed for a lease of the Royalty Theatre, and the Scottish Playgoers' Company opened on 5 April 1909 with Shaw's You Never Can Tell. Wareing's health was frail, and he was helped by assistant directors who included Norman Page, Harley Granville-Barker and William Armstrong. Among the plays presented by Wareing was The Seagull, the first Chekhov play to be given in English. The team built a reputation and a regular audience, and after initial financial struggles the company came close to breaking even, but in 1913 Wareing's health gave way and he resigned, handing over to Lewis Casson. The First World War put an end to the enterprise; the lessors of the Royalty favoured escapist entertainment in wartime and did not renew the Glasgow company's lease.

After directing and producing seasons at Brighton and Eastbourne Wareing moved to the Theatre Royal, Huddersfield where he was in charge from 1918 to 1931, producing several of the first productions in English of plays by Luigi Pirandello.

Wareing was an authority on the plays of Shakespeare. He helped W. E. Henley with the six-volume "Edinburgh Edition" of the complete works (1901) and from 1931 to 1933 was the librarian of the Shakespeare Memorial Library, Stratford-on-Avon. He died at Stratford-on-Avon on 11 April 1942, aged 65.

== References and sources ==
=== Sources ===
- Parker, John, ed. (1939). Who's Who in the Theatre (ninth ed.). London: Sir Isaac Pitman and Sons. OCLC 473894893.
- Rowell, George (1984). The Repertory Movement: A History of Regional Theatre in Britain. Cambridge and New York: Cambridge University Press. ISBN 978-0-521-23739-0.
