= Helena Carroll =

Scottish-born U.S. based stage/film and television actress

- Helena Carroll Publicity Photo
- Born: Helena Winifred Carroll; 13 November 1928; Glasgow, Scotland, UK
- Died: 31 March 2013 (aged 84); Los Angeles, California, U.S.
- Education: Notre Dame High School; Webber Douglas Academy of Dramatic Art
- Occupation: Actress
- Years active: 1950–2013
- Father: Paul Vincent Carroll

Helena Winifred Carroll (13 November 1928 – 31 March 2013) was a Scottish actress of stage, film, and television. She was the daughter of Irish playwright Paul Vincent Carroll.

== Early life and education ==
Carroll was born in Glasgow in 1928. She was the youngest of three daughters born to Irish parents Helena (née Reilly), a clothing designer, and Paul Vincent Carroll, a famed playwright. Her family was related to Charles Carroll of Carrollton, signer of the United States Declaration of Independence.

Carroll attended Clerkhill Notre Dame High School, a Roman Catholic convent school in Dumbarton, Scotland. She received her acting training at the Central School which later became the Webber Douglas Academy of Dramatic Art London.

== Career ==
=== Stage ===
Carroll appeared in three plays in London's West End and a film, Midnight Episode, by age 20. She made her Broadway debut in Separate Tables by Terence Rattigan. She moved to the U.S. during the 1940s, touring and performing on Broadway and co-founded, with Irish actor Dermot McNamara, the Irish Players, a repertory theater company in Manhattan specializing in works by Irish playwrights.

Helena split her stage work between Dublin, London and New York, appearing on Broadway in, among other productions the original production of Oliver! as Mrs. Sowerberry, as well as Pickwick, Design for Living, Waiting in the Wings, and the Elizabeth Taylor-Richard Burton revival of Private Lives (New York and Los Angeles). Her last stage performance was in 2007 at the age of 78.

=== Film and television ===
Carroll played the leading role of Nora, in a television production of her father's play, The White Steed (1959 Play of the Week Series), directed by Joe Gisterak. Gisterak directed a 1980 commissioned opera of her father's play, Beauty is Fled, as part of the "Children's Opera Series", which her sister, Theresa Perez founded. The opera was performed at the Phoenix Symphony Hall.

Prompted by producer Al Simon and casting director Caro Jones, Carroll moved to Los Angeles in the late 1960s and appeared in numerous films and television programs, including the lively Aunt Kate in John Huston's Academy Award-nominated film The Dead, based on the short story by James Joyce. Other works in Hollywood included The Friends of Eddie Coyle starring Robert Mitchum, The Jerk, directed by Carl Reiner and starring Steve Martin, The Mambo Kings, the Warren Beatty remake of Love Affair, the 1979 NBC mini-series Backstairs at the White House, and such television programs as Kojak, General Hospital, The Edge of Night, Loving Couples, Laverne and Shirley, Murder She Wrote, WKRP in Cincinnati and Married... with Children.

== Personal life ==
Carroll was the youngest of three sisters; her elder sisters were Theresa Elizabeth Perez (1924–2001), a classically trained musician and the producer/founder of the People's Pops Concerts in Phoenix, Arizona, and journalist Kathleen Moira Carroll (1927–2007).

=== Death ===
A longtime resident of Los Angeles, Carroll died in Marina del Rey, California from heart failure on 31 March 2013 at the age of 84. She is survived by half brother, Brian Carroll; niece Helena Perez, nephew Paul Vincent Perez; and a great-nephew, Paul Vincent Reilly.

== Filmography ==
Year	Title	Role	Notes
1950	Midnight Episode	Nurse	
1973	The Friends of Eddie Coyle	Sheila Coyle	
1979	The Jerk	Hester	
1980	Loving Couples	Prudence	
1981	Ghost Story	Mrs. Meredith	
1982	The Clairvoyant	Bag Lady	
1986	Bad Guys	Elsie	
1987	The Dead	Aunt Kate	
1989	Sundown: The Vampire in Retreat	Madge	
1990	Rocky V	Woman Drinker	
1992	The Mambo Kings	Mrs. Shannon	
1992	The Man Upstairs	Molly	
1994	Love Affair	Dorothy	
