= Bessie J. B. MacArthur =

- Born: February 6, 1889; Duns
- Died: 1983
- Occupation: Poet

Bessie Jane Bird MacArthur (Gaelic: Beitidh NicArtair) (6 February 1889 – 1983) was a Scottish English language and Scots language poet and playwright.

She was born Bessie Bisset on 6 February 1889 in Duns, Berwickshire and was raised in Edinburgh. She was educated at the Charlotte Square Institute and St George’s School. She married J. C. C. MacArthur, a sheep farmer of Upper Clydeside. They had a daughter and three sons, two of whom were killed serving in World War II. She later said she stopped writing "for a period of some years after the last war, when I went dumb."

Her short play The Clan of Lochlann, based on the Scottish folktale of the seal wife, won the 1926-27 Scots Radio Drama Competition and was performed for the radio by the Scottish National Players in 1927.

Her Scots language poem about the horrors of war, "Nocht o' Mortal Sicht (1942)," was originally published in The New Alliance in 1962 and included in The Oxford Book of Scottish Verse.

She was a pianist and a Licentiate of the Royal Academy of Music.

== Bibliography ==
- Clan of Lochlann, and Silis: Two Celtic Plays (Edinburgh: W.M. Urquart & Son, 1928)
- The Starry Venture, and Other Poems (London: Elkin Mathews & Marrot, 1930)
- Scots Poems (Edinburgh: Oliver & Boyd, 1938)
- Last Leave (Edinburgh: Oliver & Boyd, 1943)
- From Daer Water: Poems in Scots and English (Dunfermline: H.T. Macpherson, 1962)
- And Time Moves On (West Linton: The Castlelaw Press, 1972)
- Song o' the Lairock (Biggar: Biggar Museum ‘Trust, 1976)
