= Robert McLellan =

Scottish Renaissance dramatist (1907–1985)

- Born: Robert McLellan; 28 January 1907; Linmill Farm, Kirkfieldbank, Lanarkshire, Scotland
- Died: 27 January 1985 (aged 77); High Corrie, Isle of Arran, Scotland
- Education: University of Glasgow (1925–1928)
- Occupations: playwright; writer; poet; elected representative (Arran District Council)
- Spouse: Kathleen Heys
- Relatives: Elizabeth McLellan, née Hannah (d.1928), mother; John McLellan (d.1962), founder of the Allander Press, father; Sadie McLellan, married surname, Pritchard (b.1914), stained glass artist, sister
- Writing career
- Language: Scots and English
- Genres: comic drama; verse drama; poetry; radio drama; short fiction; non-fiction
- Subjects: Scottish character; Scottish history; notable historical figures; Scotland's languages; Enlightenment era Edinburgh; childhood experience; island community life
- Notable works: Toom Byres (1936); Jamie the Saxt (1937); The Carlin Moth (1935); The Flouers o Edinburgh (1948); Sweet Largie Bay (1956); Linmill Stories (composed 1939–1965, collected 1990)
- Notable awards: Arts Council of Great Britain Poetry Award; Civil list pension for services to Scottish literature; OBE
- Movement: Scottish Renaissance

Robert McLellan OBE (1907–1985) was a Scottish Renaissance dramatist, writer and poet and a leading figure in the twentieth century movement to recover Scotland's distinctive theatrical traditions. He found popular success with plays and stories written in his native Scots tongue and is regarded, alongside William Lorimer, as one of the most important modern exponents of fine prose in the language.

In addition to his literary career, McLellan saw active service during World War II, served as an elected councillor for the Isle of Arran, his adopted home after marriage, and was active variously in the League of Dramatists, the Society of Authors and the Lallans Society. In the early 1960s he served briefly as elected president for the District Councils Association for Scotland. He was also a frequent campaigner in defence of local heritage and a dedicated beekeeper.

McLellan today in literature is probably best remembered for the historical comedies, Jamie the Saxt and The Flouers o Edinburgh, and for his short story cycle, Linmill Stories, but his stage-writing career was a long and experimental one spanning over thirty years of crucial development for Scottish theatrical self-expression. In his later career he also wrote for radio and television. He was awarded a Civil List Pension in 1968 for "services to literature in Scotland" and received the Order of the British Empire in 1978.

== Early career ==
Robert McLellan began life as a dramatist in the early 1930s. Much of his early work was first produced by the short-lived Curtain Theatre in Glasgow, a dynamic and ambitious subscription company founded in 1933 and based in the university district of the city.

This early period was a prolific and experimental one for the playwright. Throughout the decade he was effectively Curtain's "house dramatist", trying out various genres and modes in both Scots and English for performance before a dedicated and vocal "studio" audience. Some of these early works in short form, such as Jeddart Justice and The Changeling, were also picked up by other non-professional companies around the country and entered in the annual Scottish Community Drama Association competitions of the era.

McLellan's first notable success came in 1936 with Curtain's production of his full-length three-act comedy, Toom Byres, set among the Border reivers in the early days of the reign of James VI. This was quickly followed in 1937 by Jamie the Saxt, set in the same period but this time in an urban milieu, its action taking place in and around the court in Edinburgh and featuring the king himself in his prime. This latter production, with the young Duncan Macrae famously creating a sensation in the title role, is generally regarded as the one which confirmed McLellan's reputation as a comic dramatist of substance in Scots.

McLellan is known to have been briefly resident in England as a screenwriter at some point around this time, but for whatever reason he soon came back to Scotland, marrying in 1938 and settling on the Isle of Arran. He continued to work with Curtain in mind, but his last production with the company, Portrait of an Artist, this time written in English with a contemporary setting, met with less critical acclaim. For his next works, The Smuggler and The Bogle, both set in the eighteenth century, the playwright made a return to historical Scots comedy.

In the event, The Bogle (later renamed Torwatletie), would wait until 1946 for its debut production. By the time McLellan had completed the play, early in 1940, Curtain theatre was no more, having broken up after the declaration of war in 1939. The war years would entail a significant interruption in McLellan's developing career as a playwright.

== War years ==
By now a first-time father, McLellan enlisted with the Royal Artillery in 1940. He served for the next five years as an anti-aircraft gunner in defence around the British Isles (outwith Scotland) and on the Faroe Islands. Having set drama aside, he turned instead to poetry and short story, modes of writing which he found more conducive within the context of military life. It was also during his years in the services, in circa 1943, while stationed on the Faroes, that he met the poet Hans Djurhuus. McLellan as a writer in Scots later publicly acknowledged the inspiration he derived from his meetings with Djurhuus, a writer engaged in a parallel effort to forge new literary use for his own native Faroese.

But during this time, the playwright had never lost sight of his principal career. As soon as hostilities ended in May 1945, while still in uniform but freed of his duties, McLellan straightway composed the verse drama The Carlin Moth during the fortnight after VE Day, by his own account, in the 'hot attic' of a mansion near Southwold on the Suffolk coast where his unit was stationed at the time. By combining the poetry with his drama, this resumption of his stage work had also added a new mode to his writing.

== Post-war years ==
After demobilisation in 1946, McLellan returned to Arran. During his absence, the war years had seen developments in the Scottish theatre scene, such as the formation of Unity Players in 1941, and James Bridie's founding of Glasgow Citizens in 1943, so McLellan perhaps returned with better hopes for a more professionalised institutional culture for new Scottish work. In any event, he hit the ground running. That same year, a radio production of The Carlin Moth was broadcast on the BBC Scottish Home Service; the debut production of Torwatletie, completed five years previously but kept on ice until his return from the war, was mounted by Unity (subsequently taken in 1947 to the first "Edinburgh Fringe", then on to London's Embassy Theatre in 1948); and McLellan himself was already embarked on composing his next major play, The Flouers o Edinburgh. He also by this time had The Cailleach, a short Scots play with a more sombre tone, under his belt.

McLellan conceived Flouers o Edinburgh first and foremost as a professional vehicle for Bridie's recently founded Citizens, but in the later 1940s the two men began to have differences. McLellan refused permission to tour Jamie the Saxt to London after Bridie insisted on license to make re-writes. Then, in 1948, Bridie's Citizens rejected Flouers. Although Unity once again mounted the debut production, they did not achieve the same success as with Torwatletie, and perhaps it was the radio production in 1951, a few months after Bridie's death, in which the play was finally "discovered". Either way, despite the initial resistance from Citizens, Flouers o Edinburgh went on to become one of McLellan's most popular and frequently revived works.

== 1950s ==
Citizens did finally mount two McLellan debuts: the historical study, Mary Stewart, in 1950, and The Road to the Isles, a contemporary satire of land activism in the Scottish Highlands, in 1954. These new plays did not win the same popular success as previous plays, but McLellan's established works continued to be a popular staple among the country's thriving amateur drama clubs and associations in the years before television. With Scotland's more formal theatrical institutions of the 1950s, on the other hand, McLellan became increasingly frustrated - a frustration he publicly expressed - seeing them as often resistant to, and misapprending of, Scottish theatrical values, especially around the matter of language.

In the course of the decade McLellan increasingly turned instead to broadcast radio, establishing a good working relationship with the Scottish Home Service producer James Crampsie. Crampsie was more in tune with McLellan's needs and aspirations. As well as mounting radio adaptations of his work, he commissioned new writing, including works for broadcast around Burns night, and three substantial series of dramatisations of episodes from Scottish history for schools broadcasts.

One of the next highlights of McLellan's career was the broadcast of his award-winning verse drama for radio in 1957, Sweet Largie Bay, with its beautiful and elegiac evocation of generational change and decline in island life. At the close of the decade, Rab Mossgiel, commissioned by Crampsie to mark the Burns bicentenary in 1959, was the first of the playwright's works to be broadcast on Scottish television.

== Later productions ==
McLellan's play The Carlin Moth was produced by Theatre Alba, with the support of Theatre Workshop, under the direction of Charles Nowosielski on the Edinburgh Festival Fringe in August 1990.

== Biography ==
Robert McLellan was born in 1907 at the home of his maternal grandparents in Linmill, a fruit farm close to Kirkfieldbank in the prosperous fruit-growing Clyde Valley region of Lanarkshire. His father was John McLellan, a printer by trade, who circa 1912 founded, and thereafter ran, the Allander Press in Milngavie, still at that time a detached township to the north of Glasgow. Although the young McLellan grew up in Milngavie, he generally spent his summer holidays the Lanarkshire farm of his grandparents, and it was those times in the immediate pre-First World War period, which later became the inspiration for his Linmill Stories.

After attending Bearsden Academy in Glasgow, McLellan entered the University of Glasgow as an undergraduate in moral philosophy in 1925. He did not complete his degree, possibly abandoning his studies after the death of his mother from tuberculosis in 1928.

McLellan met his future wife, Kathleen Heys from Grindleton, Lancashire, sometime before 1933 while rambling in the Lake District. They married in 1938, settling in Arran where they lived modestly on McLelllan's income as a playwright, latterly supplemented in the post-war years by the produce of his beekeeping and Kathleen's hand crafts.

McLellan died suddenly at home in High Corrie on the day before his 78th birthday in January 1985. He is buried on Arran.

== List of works by Robert McLellan ==
=== Stage plays ===
Dates of first productions:

- 1934 - Jeddart Justice, A Border Comedy in One Act (Curtain Theatre, Glasgow)
- 1934 - Tarfessock, A Tragedy in Three Acts, set in the Kilsyth Hills; a play which McLellan subsequently rejected (Curtain Theatre, Glasgow)
- 1934 - Flight of Graidhne, A Celtic Folk-tale in One Act, drama set in 3rd century Ireland at Tara (first production details not traced)
- 1935 - The Changeling, A Border Comedy in One Act (Clydebank Little Theatre)
- 1935 - Cian and Ethlin, A Play in Five Scenes, a 'Druid allegory' (Curtain Theatre, Glasgow)
- 1936 - Toom Byres, A Comedy of the Scottish Borders, McLellan's first successful full-length play (Curtain Theatre, Glasgow)
- 1937 - Jamie the Saxt, or English Siller, A Historical Comedy in Four Acts (Curtain Theatre, Glasgow; with Duncan Macrae in the title role)
- 1939 - Portrait of an Artist, contemporary drama of bohemian life set in Glasgow (Curtain Theatre, Glasgow)
- 1939 - The Smuggler, A Folk Play in One Act, set on Arran (Whiting Bay Drama Club)
- 1946 - Torwatletie, or The Apothecary, A Comedy in Three Acts, originally completed in 1940 under the title The Bogle; set on the Scottish Solway Coast (Unity Players at the Queen's Theatre, Glasgow, with Roddy McMillan in the title role; subsequently taken to the first 'Edinburgh Fringe' in 1947, and to London's Embassy Theatre in 1948)
- c.1946 - The Cailleach, A Tragedy in One Act, set on Arran under the Cromwellian occupation (first production details uncertain)
- 1948 - The Flouers o' Edinburgh, A Comedy of the Eighteenth Century in Three Acts, (Unity Players at the Kings Theatre, Edinburgh, as part of the 'Fringe' events around the second Edinburgh International Festival)
- 1950 - Mary Stewart, A Historical Drama in Five Acts (Citizens Theatre, Glasgow; Lennox Milne in the title role)
- 1950 - An Tàcharan translation of The Changeling into Gaelic (pamphlet)
- 1950 - A’ Chailleach, translation of The Cailleach into Gaelic (pamphlet)
- 1954 - The Road to the Isles, A Modern Comedy in Three Acts, set in the contemporary Scottish Highlands (Citizens Theatre, Glasgow; cast included actors Roddy McMillan and Fulton Mackay)
- 1962 - Young Auchinleck, A Comedy in Three Acts, Edinburgh International Festival production; biographical drama of the young James Boswell, (Gateway Theatre, Edinburgh)
- 1964 - Pageant for the Burgh of Kirkintilloch (community production mounted in Kirkintilloch)
- 1967 - The Hypocrite, historical drama (Edinburgh Lyceum; cast included actors Walter Carr, Leonard Maguire, Tom Conti, Richard Wilson)
- 1972 - A Pageant of Dumbarton, (community production mounted in Dumbarton, adapted from commission completed by McLellan in 1970)

=== Work on Radio ===
- 1944 - Perrie Becomes Captain, short story (BBC Home Service)
- 1946 - The Carlin Moth, An Island Fairy Tale in Four Scenes, verse drama originally conceived for the stage but first produced on radio (Scottish Home Service)
- 1951 - first radio adaptation of The Flouers o Edinburgh (Scottish Home Service)
- 1954 - As Ithers See Us, documentary drama about James Currie, first biographer of Robert Burns (Scottish Home Service, produced by James Crampsey)
- 1954 - This is My Country, first of a number of series of historical dramatisations which McLellan wrote for schools radio over the next ten years (Scottish Home Service)
- 1956 - Sweet Largie Bay, A Dramatic Poem, verse drama for radio, awarded the 1956 Arts Council of Great Britain Award for Poetry (Scottish Home Service)
- 1959 - Rab Mossgiel, A Play in Three Acts, biographical drama commissioned by the BBC for the Burns bicentenary (Scottish Home Service)
- 1960 - first series of Linmill Stories, narrated by James Gibson, recording broadcast on radio (Scottish Home Service)
- 1962 - Balloon Tytler biographical radio drama in Scots about Scottish polymath James Tytler (Scottish Home Service, produced by James Crampsey)
- 1964 - Waverley Gallery, series of stories from Scott dramatised for radio (Scottish Home Service)
- 1965 - The Old Byre at Clashmore, set in the Scottish Highlands (Scottish Home Service, produced by Stewart Conn)

=== Work on Television ===
- 1959 - television adaptation of Rab Mossgiel, the palay first broadcast on radio earlier that year (BBC TV)
- 1965 - television adaptation of Young Auchinleck, the play first produced at the 1962 Edinburgh International Festival (BBC TV)
- 1965 - Arran Burn, A Poem for Television, read by Iain Cuthbertson, (BBC TV)
- 1978 - filmed interview by Alexander Scott of McLellan at home for Spectrum (BBC TV)
- 1978 - The Daftie, film version by Micheal Alexander of a story from the Linmill cycle (BBC TV)
- 1979 - The Donegals, film version by Micheal Alexander of a story from the Linmill cycle (BBC TV)

=== Non fiction ===
- 1958 - The Case for a Real Scots Theatre, in Saltire Review No. 16, Autumn 1958
- 1960 - Review of Sydney Goodsir Smith's play, The Wallace, in Saltire Review No. 22, Autumn 1960
- 1970 - The Isle of Arran, full-length historical and geographical survey of the Isle of Arran
- 1977 - The Ancient Monuments of Arran, HMSO guide book

=== Unproduced work ===
- 1959 - Kirstan and the Vikar, A Parable in Scots, drama in Scots set on a fictional island under German occupation in World War II (completed in stage and radio versions)
- 1960 - Kilellan, series of completed television sit-com episodes set on Arran (offered to the new STV company in Glasgow but never produced)
- 1964 - A Cure for the Colonel, episode for Dr Finlay’s Casebook (completed but not produced)
- 1965 - Mum and Sally, short drama written for television
- 1967 - Progress to Extinction, drafts for a television documentary on island depopulation
- 1970 - My Dear Dear Sister, long draft play about William and Dorothy Wordsworth

=== Posthumous collections ===
Although individual plays and stories were regularly published throughout McLellan's lifetime, collected editions of his works only appeared posthumously:

- 1990 - Linmill Stories, McLellan's short-story cycle in Scots, ISBN 9-780862-412821
- 2014 - Playing Scotland's Story: Collected Dramatic Works, McLellan's principal plays

== Reviews ==
- Ross, Raymond J. (1983), Directed Irony, which includes a review of Collected Plays, in Hearn, Sheila G. (ed.), Cencrastus No. 11, New Year 1983, pp. 45 7 46, ISSN 0264-0856
