= The Seagull =

1896 play by Anton Chekhov

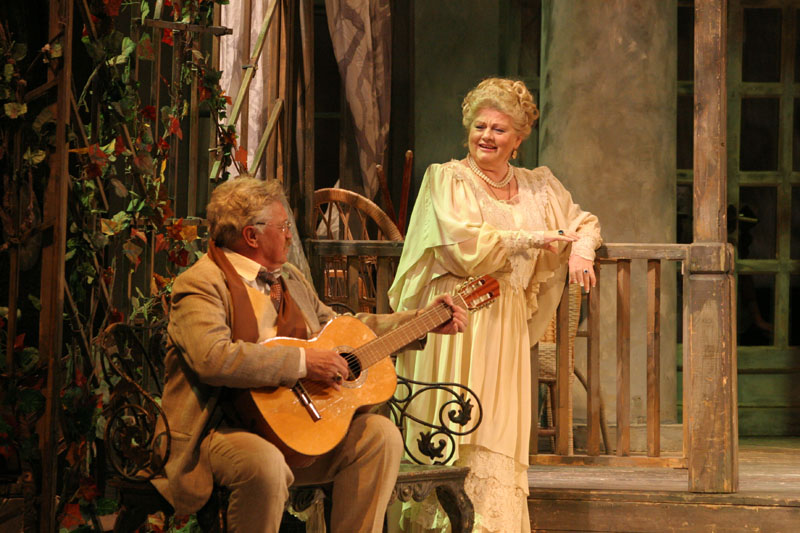
- Maly Theatre production in 2008
- Original language: Russian
- Written by: Anton Chekhov
- Genre: Tragicomedy
- Setting: Sorin's country estate

Premiere
- Date: 17 October 1896
- Place: Alexandrinsky Theatre, Saint Petersburg, Russia

The Seagull (Russian: Ча́йка, romanized: Cháyka) is a play by Russian dramatist Anton Chekhov, written in 1895 and first produced in 1896. The Seagull is generally considered to be the first of his four major plays. It dramatizes the romantic and artistic conflicts among four characters: the famous middlebrow story writer Boris Trigorin, the ingenue Nina, the fading actress Irina Arkadina, and her son the symbolist playwright Konstantin Treplev.

Like Chekhov's other full-length plays, The Seagull relies upon an ensemble cast of diverse, fully-developed characters. In contrast to the melodrama of mainstream 19th-century theatre, lurid actions (such as Konstantin's suicide attempts) are not shown onstage. Characters tend to speak in subtext rather than directly. The character Trigorin is considered one of Chekhov's greatest male roles.

The opening night of the first production was a famous failure. Vera Komissarzhevskaya, playing Nina, was so intimidated by the hostility of the audience that she lost her voice. Chekhov left the audience and spent the last two acts behind the scenes. When supporters wrote to him that the production later became a success, he assumed that they were merely trying to be kind. When Konstantin Stanislavski, the seminal Russian theatre practitioner of the time, directed it in 1898 for his Moscow Art Theatre, the play was a triumph. Stanislavski's production became "one of the greatest events in the history of Russian theatre and one of the greatest new developments in the history of world drama".

Stanislavski's direction caused The Seagull to be perceived as a tragedy through overzealousness with the concept of subtext, whereas Chekhov intended it to be a comedy.

== Writing ==
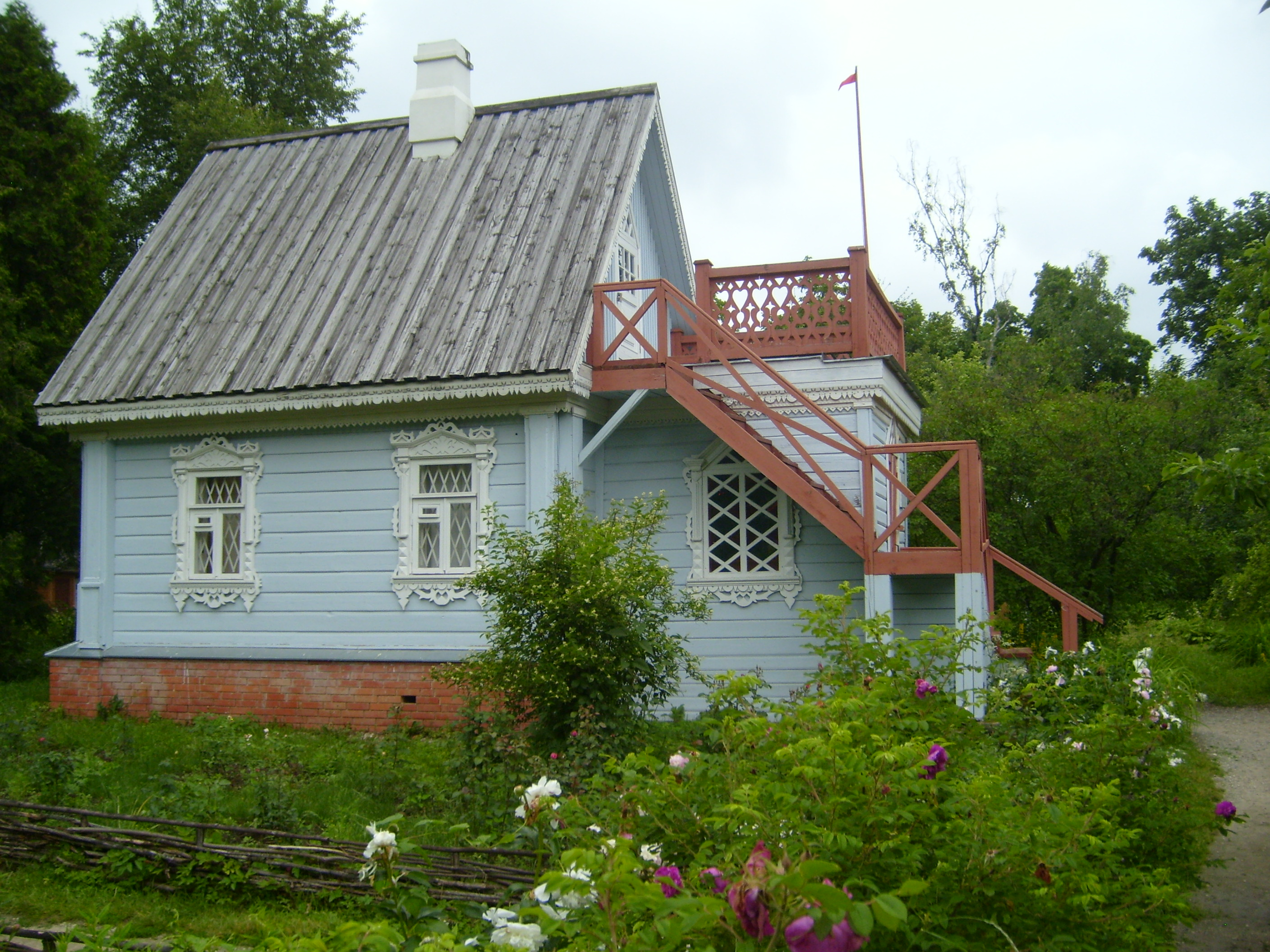
Guest cottage at Melikhovo where Chekhov wrote The Seagull

Chekhov purchased the Melikhovo farm in 1892 and ordered a lodge built in the middle of a cherry orchard. The lodge had three rooms, one containing a bed and another a writing table. Chekhov eventually moved in, and in a letter written in October 1895 he wrote:

I am writing a play which I shall probably not finish before the end of November. I am writing it not without pleasure, though I swear fearfully at the conventions of the stage. It's a comedy, there are three women's parts, six men's, four acts, landscapes (view over a lake); a great deal of conversation about literature, little action, and tons of love.

Thus he acknowledged a departure from traditional dramatic action. This departure became a hallmark of Chekhovian theater. Chekhov's statement also reflects his view of the play as a comedy, a view he maintained towards all his plays. After the play's disastrous opening night, his friend Aleksey Suvorin chided him for being "womanish" and accused him of being in "a funk". Chekhov vigorously denied this, stating:

Why this libel? After the performance, I had supper at Romanov's. On my word of honor. Then I went to bed, slept soundly, and the next day, went home without uttering a sound of complaint. If I had been in a funk I should have run from editor to editor and actor to actor, should have nervously entreated them to be considerate, should nervously have inserted useless corrections, and should have spent two or three weeks in Petersburg fussing over my Seagull, in excitement, in a cold perspiration, in lamentation... I acted as coldly and reasonably as a man who has made an offer, received a refusal, and has nothing left but to go. Yes, my vanity was stung, but you know it was not a bolt from the blue; I was expecting a failure and was prepared for it, as I warned you with perfect sincerity beforehand.

And a month later:

I thought that if I had written and put on the stage a play so obviously brimming over with monstrous defects, I had lost all instinct and that, therefore, my machinery must have gone wrong for good.

The eventual success of the play, both in the remainder of its first run and in the subsequent staging by the Moscow Art Theatre under Stanislavski, encouraged Chekhov to remain a playwright and led to the overwhelming success of his next endeavor, Uncle Vanya, and indeed to the rest of his dramatic work.

== Cast and characters ==
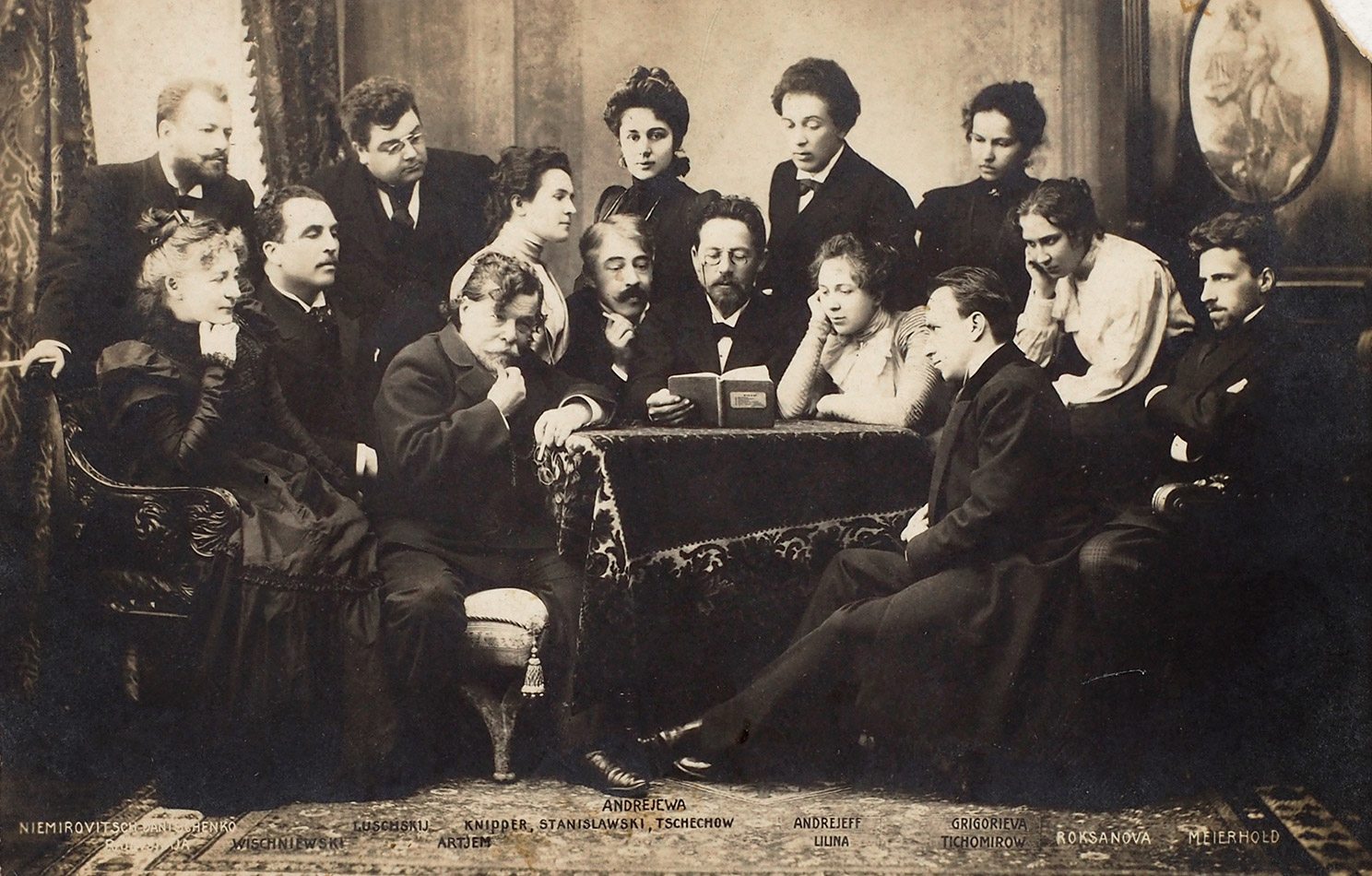
Chekhov reads The Seagull with the Moscow Art Theatre company. Chekhov reads (centre), Konstantin Stanislavski and Olga Knipper (right), Stanislavski's wife, Maria Lilina, (left). Vsevolod Meyerhold (seated, far right) Vladimir Nemirovich-Danchenko (far left).

- Irina Nikolayevna Arkadina – an actress, married surname Trepleva
- Konstantin Gavrilovich Treplev – Irina's son, a young aspiring writer
- Pyotr Nikolayevich Sorin – Irina's brother, owner of the country estate
- Nina Mikhailovna Zarechnaya – a young woman, the daughter of a rich landowner
- Ilya Afanasyevich Shamrayev – a retired lieutenant and the manager of Sorin's estate
- Polina Andreyevna – Shamrayev's wife and Masha's stepmother
- Maria Ilyinishna Shamrayeva, "Masha" – Shamrayev's daughter
- Boris Alexeyevich Trigorin – a novelist
- Yevgeny Sergeyevich Dorn – a doctor
- Semyon Semyonovich Medvedenko – a teacher in love with Masha
- Yakov – a workman
- Cook
- Maid

Notable casts
Character	West End Revival	West End Revival	Public Theater	West End Revival	Broadway Revival	West End Revival	West End Revival
Character	1936	1994	2001	2007	2008	2020	2025
Irina Arkadina	Edith Evans	Judi Dench	Meryl Streep	Frances Barber	Kristin Scott Thomas	Indira Varma	Cate Blanchett
Konstantin Treplev	Stephen Haggard	Alan Cox	Philip Seymour Hoffman	Richard Goulding	Mackenzie Crook	Daniel Monks	Kodi Smit-McPhee
Pyotr Sorin	Frederick Lloyd	Norman Rodway	Christopher Walken	William Gaunt	Peter Wight	Robert Glenister	Jason Watkins
Nina Zarechnaya	Peggy Ashcroft	Helen McCrory	Natalie Portman	Romola Garai	Carey Mulligan	Emilia Clarke	Emma Corrin
Ilya Shamrayev	George Devine	Robert Demeger	John Goodman	Guy Williams	Julian Gamble	Jason Barnett	Paul Higgins
Polina Andreyevna	Clare Harris	Anna Calder-Marshall	Debra Monk	Melanie Jessop	Ann Dowd	Sara Powell	Priyanga Burford
"Masha" Shamreyeva	Marita Hunt	Rachel Power	Marcia Gay Harden	Monica Dolan	Zoe Kazan	Sophie Wu	Tanya Reynolds
Boris Trigorin	John Gielgud	Bill Nighy	Kevin Kline	Gerald Kyd	Peter Sarsgaard	Tom Rhys Harries	Tom Burke
Yevgeny Dorn	Leon Quartermaine	Edward Pethebridge	Larry Pine	Jonathan Hyde	Art Malik	Gerald Kyd	Paul Bazley
Semyon Medvedenko	Ivor Barnard	John Hodgkinson	Stephen Spinella	Ben Meyjes	Pearce Quigley	Mika Onyx Johnson	Zachary Hart
Yakov	Alec Guinness	Jimmy Gardner	Henry Gummer	Peter Hinton	Christopher Patrick Nolan	N/A	N/A

== Plot ==
=== Act I ===
Pyotr Sorin is a retired senior civil servant in failing health at his country estate. His sister, actress Irina Arkadina, arrives at the estate for a brief vacation with her lover, the writer Boris Trigorin. Pyotr and his guests gather at an outdoor stage to see an unconventional play that Irina's son, Konstantin Treplev, has written and directed. The play-within-a-play features Nina Zarechnaya, a young woman who lives on a neighboring estate, as the "soul of the world" in a time far in the future. The play is Konstantin's latest attempt at creating a new theatrical form. It is a dense symbolist work. Irina laughs at the play, finding it ridiculous and incomprehensible; the performance ends prematurely after audience interruption and Konstantin storms off in humiliation. Irina does not seem concerned about her son, who has not found his way in the world. Although others ridicule Konstantin's drama, the physician Yevgeny Dorn praises him.

Act I also sets up the play's various romantic triangles. The schoolteacher Semyon Medvedenko loves Masha, the daughter of the estate's steward Ilya Shamrayev and his wife Polina Andryevna. However, Masha is in love with Konstantin, who is in love with Nina, but Nina falls for Trigorin. Polina is in an affair with Yevgeny. When Masha tells Yevgeny about her longing for Konstantin, Yevgeny helplessly blames the lake for making everybody feel romantic.

=== Act II ===
A few days later, in the afternoon, characters are outside the estate. Arkadina, after reminiscing about happier times, engages in a heated argument with the house steward Shamrayev and decides to leave. Nina lingers behind after the group leaves, and Konstantin arrives to give her a gull that he has shot. Nina is confused and horrified at the gift. Konstantin sees Trigorin approaching and leaves in a jealous fit.

Nina asks Trigorin to tell her about the writer's life; he replies that it is not an easy one. Nina says that she knows the life of an actress is not easy either, but she wants more than anything to be one. Trigorin sees the gull that Konstantin has shot and muses on how he could use it as a subject for a short story:

The plot for the short story: a young girl lives all her life on the shore of a lake. She loves the lake, like a gull, and she's happy and free, like a gull. But a man arrives by chance, and when he sees her, he destroys her, out of sheer boredom. Like this gull.

Arkadina calls for Trigorin, and he leaves as she tells him that she has changed her mind – they will be staying. Nina lingers behind, enthralled with Trigorin's celebrity and modesty, and gushes, "My dream!"

=== Act III ===
Inside the estate, Arkadina and Trigorin have decided to depart. Between acts, Konstantin attempted suicide by shooting himself in the head, but the bullet only grazed his skull. He spends the majority of Act III with his scalp heavily bandaged.

Nina finds Trigorin eating breakfast and presents him with a medallion that proclaims her devotion to him, using a line from one of Trigorin's own books: "If you ever need my life, come and take it." She retreats after begging for one last chance to see Trigorin before he leaves. Arkadina appears, followed by Sorin, whose health has continued to deteriorate. Trigorin leaves to continue packing. After a brief argument between Arkadina and Sorin, Sorin collapses in grief. He is helped by Medvedenko. Konstantin enters and asks his mother to change his bandage. As she is doing this, Konstantin disparages Trigorin, eliciting another argument. When Trigorin reenters, Konstantin leaves in tears.

Trigorin asks Arkadina if they can stay at the estate. She flatters and cajoles him until he agrees to return with her to Moscow. After she has left the room, Nina comes to say her final goodbye to Trigorin and to inform him that she is running away to become an actress against her parents' wishes. They kiss passionately and make plans to meet again in Moscow.

=== Act IV ===
It is winter two years later, in the drawing room that has been converted to Konstantin's study. Masha finally accepts Medvedenko's marriage proposal, and they have a child together, though Masha still nurses an unrequited love for Konstantin. Various characters discuss what has happened in the two years that have passed: Nina and Trigorin lived together in Moscow for a time until he abandoned her and went back to Arkadina. Nina gave birth to Trigorin's baby, but it died in a short time. Nina never achieved any real success as an actress, and she is currently on a tour of the provinces with a small theatre group. Konstantin has had some short stories published, but he is increasingly depressed. Sorin's health is still failing, and the people at the estate have telegraphed for Arkadina to come for his final days.

Most of the play's characters go to the drawing room to play a game of bingo. Konstantin does not join them, instead working on a manuscript at his desk. After the group leaves to eat dinner, Konstantin hears someone at the back door. He is surprised to find Nina, whom he invites inside. Nina tells Konstantin about her life over the last two years. Konstantin says that he followed Nina. She starts to compare herself to the gull that Konstantin killed in Act II, then rejects that and says "I am an actress." She tells him that she was forced to tour with a second-rate theatre company after the death of the child she had with Trigorin, but she seems to have a newfound confidence. Konstantin pleads with her to stay, but she is in such disarray that his pleading means nothing. She embraces Konstantin and leaves. Despondent, Konstantin spends two minutes silently tearing up his manuscripts before leaving the study.

The group reenters and returns to the bingo game. There is a sudden gunshot from off-stage, and Dorn goes to investigate. He returns and takes Trigorin aside. Dorn tells Trigorin to somehow get Arkadina away, for Konstantin has just shot himself.

== Performance history ==
=== Premiere in St. Petersburg ===
The first night of The Seagull on 17 October 1896 at the Alexandrinsky Theatre in Petersburg was a disaster, booed by the audience. The hostile audience intimidated Vera Komissarzhevskaya so severely that she lost her voice. Some considered her the best actor in Russia who, according to Chekhov, had moved people to tears as Nina in rehearsal. The next day, Chekhov, who had taken refuge backstage for the last two acts, announced to Suvorin that he was finished with writing plays. When supporters assured him that later performances were more successful, Chekhov assumed they were just being kind. The Seagull impressed the playwright and friend of Chekhov Vladimir Nemirovich-Danchenko, however, who said Chekhov should have won the Griboyedov prize that year for The Seagull instead of himself.

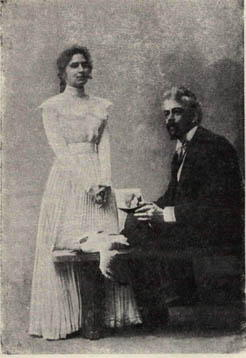
Studio portrait of Stanislavski as Trigorin from the 1898 Moscow Art Theatre production

=== Moscow Art Theatre production ===
Nemirovich overcame Chekhov's refusal to allow the play to appear in Moscow and convinced Stanislavski to direct the play for their innovative and newly founded Moscow Art Theatre in 1898. Stanislavski prepared a detailed directorial score, which indicated when the actors should "wipe away dribble, blow their noses, smack their lips, wipe away sweat, or clean their teeth and nails with matchsticks", as well as organising a tight control of the overall mise-en-scène. This approach was intended to facilitate the unified expression of the inner action that Stanislavski perceived to be hidden beneath the surface of the play in its subtext. Stanislavski's directorial score was published in 1938.

Stanislavski played Trigorin, while Vsevolod Meyerhold, the future director and practitioner (whom Stanislavski on his death-bed declared to be "my sole heir in the theatre"), played Konstantin, and Olga Knipper (Chekhov's future wife) played Arkadina. The production opened on 17 December 1898 with a sense of crisis in the air in the theatre; most of the actors were mildly self-tranquilised with Valerian drops. In a letter to Chekhov, one audience member described how:

In the first act something special started, if you can so describe a mood of excitement in the audience that seemed to grow and grow. Most people walked through the auditorium and corridors with strange faces, looking as if it were their birthday and, indeed, (dear God I'm not joking) it was perfectly possible to go up to some completely strange woman and say: "What a play? Eh?"

Nemirovich-Danchenko described the applause, which came after a prolonged silence, as bursting from the audience like a dam breaking. The production received unanimous praise from the press.

It was not until 1 May 1899 that Chekhov saw the production, in a performance without sets but in make-up and costumes at the Paradiz Theatre. He praised the production but was less keen on Stanislavski's own performance; he objected to the "soft, weak-willed tone" in his interpretation (shared by Nemirovich) of Trigorin and entreated Nemirovich to "put some spunk into him or something". He proposed that the play be published with Stanislavski's score of the production's mise-en-scène. Chekhov's collaboration with Stanislavski proved crucial to the creative development of both men. Stanislavski's attention to psychological realism and ensemble playing coaxed the buried subtleties from the play and revived Chekhov's interest in writing for the stage. Chekhov's unwillingness to explain or expand on the script forced Stanislavski to dig beneath the surface of the text in ways that were new in theatre. The Moscow Art Theatre to this day bears the seagull as its emblem to commemorate the historic production that gave it its identity.

=== Other notable productions ===
- The play had its German premiere in April 1909 at the Hebbel-Theater, Berlin. The play was cordially received but the Berlin correspondent of The Era doubted that the work would last: "It is in the heavy, gloomy style of most Russian writers, while the interest of the average audience is not lively enough in the heroine's adventures to keep the piece any length of time in the bill".
- The first production in English was given at the Royalty Theatre, Glasgow, on 2 November 1909 by the Glasgow Repertory Theatre company, with Mary Jerrold as Arkadina, Milton Rosmer as Konstantin, Hubert Harben as Shamrayev, Campbell Gullan as Trigorin and Laurence Hanray as Sorin.
- The first production in London was at the Little Theatre on 31 March 1912, with Gertrude Kingston as Arkadina.
- The play's Broadway premiere was at the Bandbox Theatre on 20 May 1916, with Helen Westley as Arkadina.
- The French premiere, under the title La Mouette, was staged by Georges Pitoëff at the Théâtre des Champs-Élysées, Paris, in 1922. The cast included Nora Sylvère as Arkadina, Michel Simon as Sorin, Pitoëff as Trigorin and Ludmilla Pitoëff as Nina.
- A production directed by Theodore Komisarjevsky opened at the New Theatre, London, on 20 May 1936, with Edith Evans as Arkadina, John Gielgud as Trigorin, Frederick Lloyd as Sorin, George Devine as Shamrayev, Martita Hunt as Masha and Peggy Ashcroft as Nina. After lukewarm reviews of earlier productions the play was now hailed by British critics: The Times said, "The Seagull is among the supreme masterpieces of the theatre", and The Observer commented that Chekhov would begin to rival Shakespeare as the West End's greatest attraction.
- The Theatre Guild presented the play at the Shubert Theatre, New York, in March 1938. Lynn Fontanne played Arkadina, with Alfred Lunt (Trigorin), Sydney Greenstreet (Sorin), Margaret Webster (Masha) and, in her Broadway debut, Uta Hagen (as Nina). As in Britain, the play now received respectful and enthusiastic notices: one reviewer called it "great drama, tragic and luminous, with a light which shadows the petty playwrighting of today's dramatists".
- Sacha Pitoëff's 1962 production for a five-month tour of France, Switzerland, Belgium and Luxembourg featured Romy Schneider as Nina.
- In 1974, the Williamstown Theatre Festival mounted a production starring Frank Langella (Treplyov), Blythe Danner (Nina), Lee Grant (Arkadina), Kevin McCarthy (Trigorin), and Olympia Dukakis (Pauline Andreyevna). A filmed version was telecast the following year on WNET's Theater in America.
- The first of two productions by the National Theatre in London was in 1994, in an adaptation by Pam Gems, directed by John Caird, with Judi Dench (Arkadina), Norman Rodway (Sorin), Bill Nighy (Trigorin) and Edward Petherbridge (Dorn). A second production by the National Theatre, in 2006, had a cast headed by Juliet Stevenson in a production of Martin Crimp's adaptation, directed by Katie Mitchell.
- In 1998, a production by Daniela Thomas, assisted by Luiz Päetow, toured Brazil under the title Da Gaivota, with Fernanda Montenegro as Arkadina, Matheus Nachtergaele as Treplyov, and Fernanda Torres as Nina.
- The Joseph Papp Public Theater presented Chekhov's play as part of the New York Shakespeare Festival summer season in Central Park from 25 July 2001 to 26 August 2001. The production, directed by Mike Nichols, starred Meryl Streep as Arkadina, Christopher Walken as Sorin, Philip Seymour Hoffman as Treplyov, John Goodman as Shamrayev, Marcia Gay Harden as Masha, Kevin Kline as Trigorin, Debra Monk as Polina, Stephen Spinella as Medvedenko, and Natalie Portman as Nina.
- In January 2007, the Royal Court Theatre staged a production of The Seagull with Kristin Scott Thomas as Arkadina, Mackenzie Crook as Treplyov and Carey Mulligan as Nina. It also featured Chiwetel Ejiofor and Art Malik. The production was directed by Ian Rickson.
- In 2007 a production by the Royal Shakespeare Company toured internationally before coming into residence at the West End's New London Theatre until 12 January 2008. It starred Frances Barber as Arkadina, William Gaunt and Ian McKellen alternating as Sorin, Richard Goulding as Treplyov, Jonathan Hyde as Dorn, Monica Dolan as Masha, and Romola Garai as Nina. Garai in particular was well reviewed.
- On 16 September 2008, the Walter Kerr Theatre on Broadway began previews of Ian Rickson's production of The Seagull with Kristin Scott Thomas reprising her role as Arkadina. The cast also included Peter Sarsgaard as Trigorin, Mackenzie Crook as Treplyov, Art Malik as Dorn, Carey Mulligan as Nina, Zoe Kazan as Masha, and Ann Dowd as Polina.
- In 2011, a new version directed by Golden Mask winner Yuri Butusov debuted at Konstantin Raikin's Satyricon theater, notable for its return to comedy and "Brechtian-style techniques". In 2017 and in coordination with Butusov, a production was filmed and subtitled in English by the Stage Russia project.
- The Oregon Shakespeare Festival staged Seagull in the New Theatre from 22 February until 22 June 2012, adapted and directed by Libby Appel.
- In 2014, a translation into Afrikaans under the title Die seemeeu, directed by Christiaan Olwagen and starring Sandra Prinsloo, was staged at the Aardklop arts festival in Potchefstroom.
- In January 2015, Toronto's Crow's Theatre produced The Seagull in association with Canadian Stage and The Company Theatre. Helmed by Crow's Theatre's artistic director Chris Abraham, the creative team was composed of set and costume designer Julie Fox, lighting designer Kimberly Purtell and sound designer Thomas Ryder Payne. The Robert Falls adaptation, based on a translation by George Calderon, featured an all-Canadian cast including Yanna McIntosh as Arkadina, Eric Peterson as Sorin, Christine Horne as Nina, Tony Nappo as Shamrayev, Bahia Watson as Masha, Tom McCamus as Dorn and Gregory Prest as Medvedenko.
- Regent's Park Open Air Theatre presented a new version of The Seagull by Torben Betts in June 2015. The production received critical praise for its design by Jon Bausor and the new adaptation by Betts.
- In March 2015, Hurrah Hurrah and the Hot Blooded Theatre Company presented The Seagull in an unused shop-front with the help of The Rocks Pop-up.
- In 2016, Thomas Ostermeier, director of Berlin's Schaubühne theatre, directed The Seagull at the Théâtre de Vidy, Lausanne.
- In 2020, Anya Reiss's adaptation of The Seagull began previews on 11 March in the Playhouse Theatre, starring Emilia Clarke as Nina and Indira Varma as Irina. The production was suspended on 16 March due to the COVID-19 pandemic but subsequently reopened at the Harold Pinter Theatre in July 2022 and ran until September.
- Also in 2020, the Auckland Theatre Company presented an on-line production during the COVID-19 lockdown, using the device of a Zoom meeting for the stage. It was adapted by Eli Kent and Eleanor Bishop, who also directed it, with rehearsals and performances carried out online. It was well received by critics around the world, with The Scotsman declaring it one of the "best plays to watch online".

== Analysis and criticism ==
The Seagull is a tragicomedy written in 1895 as an alternative to contemporary theatre in Russia. Some authors argue that the development of this play should be understood in relation to historical conditions such as war, immigration and repression.Chekov likely wanted to break the standard of theater at the time, in which women only existed as a part of the central male lead.

The defining features of the Realism (theatre) style include complex interpersonal relationships such as romantic relationships, social classes, and generational differences, contradictions within characters with respect to what they say and do, as well as the occurrence of events that are indirectly mentioned by the characters. It has been remarked that the play was "a spectacle of waste" (such as at the beginning of the play when Medvedenko asks Masha why she always wears black, she answers "Because I'm in mourning for my life.").

Multiple authors have identified similarities with other theatre plays. For example, The Seagull has an intertextual relationship with Shakespeare's Hamlet. Nina and Treplyov quote lines from it before the play-within-a-play in the first act (and this device is itself used in Hamlet). There are many allusions to Shakespearean plot details as well. For instance, Treplyov seeks to win his mother back from the usurping older man Trigorin much as Hamlet tries to win Queen Gertrude back from his uncle Claudius. In both cases, Konstantin and Hamlet seek to open their mothers’ eyes so they can perceive their partners as they themselves do.

Critics have also compared The Seagull to Henrik Ibsen's The Wild Duck, since both plays share structural and thematic similarities, such as the use of a bird as a potential symbol in the title, the sequential order of events, complex interpersonal relationships, and the suicide of a character at the end of the play.

The use of symbols throughout the play has also been analyzed. Konstantin's play shows a dualistic structure based on oppositional elements. Some examples are life and death, stability and evolution, good and evil, connection and separation. The combination of surrealistic elements within a naturalistic setting has also been interpreted as a dualistic contradiction. The lake in the play has been associated as a symbol of loneliness. The emotional complexity and psychological ambiguity are described by critics as a critical feature of the "Chekhovian world".

The symbol of a dead seagull appears throughout the play. Some critics have related this symbol to Nina since her last name "Zarechnaya" is translated as “beyond the river”. Nina's trajectory in the play has also been interpreted metaphorically as a bird migration. The character is looking for better conditions and returning home after her long trip.

A second interpretation of the seagull is not as a character but as a symbol of the relationship developed between Nina and Konstantin. Finally, the third interpretation involves that "The Seagull", that is, the thing destroyed by the man is Konstantin rather than Nina. Nina will continue to live her life without Boris or Konstantin.

== Translation ==
The Seagull was first translated into English for a performance at the Royalty Theatre, Glasgow, in November 1909. Since that time, there have been numerous translations of the text—between 1998 and 2004 alone there were 25 published versions. In the introduction to his own version, Tom Stoppard wrote: "You can't have too many English Seagulls: at the intersection of all of them, the Russian one will be forever elusive." In fact, the problems start with the title of the play: there's no sea anywhere near the play's settings, so the bird in question was in all likelihood a lake-dwelling gull such as the common gull (larus canus), rather than a nautical variant. In Russian both kinds of birds are named chayka, simply meaning "gull", as in English. However, the title persists as it is much more euphonious in English than the much shorter and blunter "The Gull", which comes across as too forceful and direct to represent the encompassing vague and partially hidden feelings beneath the surface. Therefore, the faint reference to the sea has been seen as a more fitting representation of the intent of the play.

Some early translations of The Seagull have come under criticism from modern Russian scholars. Marian Fell's translation, in particular, has been criticized for its elementary mistakes and total ignorance of Russian life and culture. Peter France, translator and author of the book The Oxford Guide to Literature in English Translation, wrote of Chekhov's multiple adaptations:

Proliferation and confusion of translation reign in the plays. Throughout the history of Chekhov on the British and American stages we see a version translated, adapted, and cobbled together for each new major production, very often by a theatre director with no knowledge of the original, working from a crib prepared by a Russian with no knowledge of the stage.

=== Notable English translations ===
Translator	Year	Publisher	Notes
George Calderon	1909	Glasgow Repertory Theatre	This is the first known English translation of The Seagull. This translation premiered at the Royalty Theatre, Glasgow, on 2 November 1909, also directed by Calderon.
Marian Fell	1912	Charles Scribner's Sons	First published English language translation of The Seagull in the United States, performed at the Bandbox Theatre on Broadway by the Washington Square Players in 1916. Complete text from Project Gutenberg here.
Fred Eisemann	1913	Poet Lore	Appeared in Volume 26, Number 1 (New Year's 1913) of Poet Lore magazine
Constance Garnett	1923	Bantam Books	Performed on Broadway at the Civic Repertory Theatre in 1929, directed by Eva Le Gallienne.
Stark Young	1939	Charles Scribner's Sons	Used in the 1938 Broadway production starring Uta Hagen as Nina, as well as the 1975 film directed by John Desmond.
Elisaveta Fen	1954	Penguin Classics	Along with Constance Garnett's translation, this is one of the most widely read translations of The Seagull.
David Magarshack	1956	Hill & Wang	Commissioned for the 1956 West End production at the Saville Theatre, directed by Michael Macowan, and starring Diana Wynyard, Lyndon Brook, and Hugh Williams.
Moura Budberg	1968	Sidney Lumet Productions	Commissioned and used for the 1968 film directed by Sidney Lumet.
Tennessee Williams	1981	New Directions Publishing	Williams' "free adaptation" is titled The Notebook of Trigorin. First produced by the Vancouver Playhouse Theatre Company in 1981, the United States premiere occurred at the Cincinnati Playhouse in 1996, starring Lynn Redgrave as Madame Arkadina. Williams was still revising the script when he died in 1983.
Tania Alexander & Charles Sturridge	1985	Applause Books	Commissioned and used for the 1985 Oxford Playhouse production directed by Charles Sturridge and Vanessa Redgrave.
Michael Frayn	1988	Methuen Publishing	Translated Nina's famous line "I am a seagull", to "I am the seagull", as in the seagull in Trigorin's story. This was justified by Frayn, in part, because of the non-existence of indefinite or definite articles in the Russian language.
Pam Gems	1991	Nick Hern Books	
David French	1992	Talonbooks	Used in the 1992 Broadway production by the National Actors Theatre at the Lyceum Theatre, directed by Marshall W. Mason and featuring Tyne Daly, Ethan Hawke, Laura Linney, and Jon Voight.
Paul Schmidt	1997	Harper Perennial	Used in the 2008 off-Broadway production at the Classic Stage Company, starring Dianne Wiest, Alan Cumming, and Kelli Garner.
Tom Stoppard	1997	Faber & Faber	Premiered at The Old Vic theatre in London on 28 April 1997. Its United States premiere in July 2001 in New York City drew crowds who sometimes waited 15 hours for tickets.
Peter Gill	2000	Bloomsbury	Translation commissioned by the Royal Shakespeare Company and premiered at the Swan Theatre on 30 January 2000.
Peter Carson	2002	Penguin Classics	
Christopher Hampton	2007	Faber & Faber	Used in the Royal Court Theatre's 2008 production of The Seagull at the Walter Kerr Theatre, directed by Ian Rickson and featuring Peter Sarsgaard, Kristin Scott Thomas, Mackenzie Crook and Carey Mulligan.
Benedict Andrews	2011	Currency Press	Used in the 2011 production at Sydney's Belvoir St Theatre, starring Judy Davis, David Wenham, Emily Barclay, Anita Hegh, Gareth Davies, Dylan Young and Maeve Dermody, adapted for an Australian setting, with minor dialogue changes.
Anya Reiss	2014		Premiered at the Southwark Playhouse.
David Hare	2015	Faber & Faber	Presented at the Chichester Festival Theatre in tandem with Hare's translations of Platonov and Ivanov.

== Adaptations ==
=== Theatre ===
The American playwright Tennessee Williams adapted the play as The Notebook of Trigorin, which premiered in 1981. That year, Thomas Kilroy's adaptation, The Seagull also premiered at the Royal Court Theatre in London. The Canadian playwright Daniel MacIvor wrote an adaptation called His Greatness.

In 2004, American playwright Regina Taylor's African-American adaptation, Drowning Crow, was performed on Broadway.

Emily Mann wrote and directed an adaptation called A Seagull in the Hamptons. The play premiered at the McCarter Theatre May 2008.

Libby Appel did a new version that premiered in 2011 at the Marin Theatre in Mill Valley using newly discovered material from Chekhov's original manuscripts. In pre-Revolutionary Russia, plays underwent censorship from two sources, the government censor and the directors. The removed passages were saved in the archives of Russia, and unavailable till the fall of the Iron Curtain.

In 2011, Benedict Andrews re-imagined the work as being set on a modern Australian beach in his production of the play at Sydney's Belvoir Theatre, which starred Judy Davis, David Wenham and Maeve Darmody. He did this to explore the ideas of liminal space and time.

In 2013, a deconstruction of the play by Aaron Posner, set in the modern day under the title Stupid Fucking Bird, was premiered at the Woolly Mammoth Theatre Company in Washington, D.C.; it won the 2014 Charles MacArthur Award for Outstanding New Play or Musical and has been staged widely across American theatres.

In 2014, Takarazuka Revues's Star Troupe performed a musical version of the play, which was adapted and directed by Naoko Koyonagi. It starred Makoto Rei as Konstantin and Mirei Shiroki as Nina.

A 2022 gender-fluid adaptation of the Tom Stoppard version was completed by the Doris Place Players to great success in Los Angeles.

In 2022, Emilia Clarke starred in Anya Reiss' adaptation, directed by Jamie Lloyd, at the Harold Pinter Theatre in London. It was described as a unique 21st century modernisation. It was reviewed as "radical, stripped-back, strangely gripping".

Thomas Bradshaw wrote a modern-day adaptation set in New York's Hudson Valley entitled The Seagull/Woodstock, NY. The play was produced Off-Broadway by The New Group in 2023 and starred Parker Posey, Nat Wolff, Ato Essandoh, and Hari Nef.

A new version by Duncan Macmillan and Thomas Ostermeier, starring Emma Corrin as Nina and Cate Blanchett as Arkadina, is premiered at London's Barbican Centre in February 2025. Directed by Ostermeier, the adaptation is also starred Priyanga Burford, Tom Burke, Tanya Reynolds, Kodi Smit-McPhee and Jason Watkins. It was met with praise from critics, with Arifa Akbar of The Guardian calling it a "masterful staging [that] has tremendous performances" and Demetrious Matheou of The Hollywood Reporter highlighting Ostermeier's staging as "boisterous, dazzling delight".

A solo dramatic adaptation titled The Gull, written by Zachary Cohn and starring Joan Korte, premiered off-Broadway at Barrow Group Theatre in March 2025.

=== Film ===
Sidney Lumet's 1968 film The Sea Gull used Moura Budberg's translation. The play was also adapted as the Russian film The Seagull in 1972.

The 2003 film La petite Lili by director Claude Miller, starring Ludivine Sagnier as Nina renamed Lili, updates Chekhov's play to contemporary France in the world of the cinema.

Christian Camargo directed a 2014 film adaptation of the play, titled Days and Nights, set in rural New England during the 1980s. The film starred Camargo, William Hurt, Allison Janney, Katie Holmes, Mark Rylance, and Juliet Rylance.

An American film titled The Seagull went into production in 2015. It was released on May 11, 2018, by Sony Pictures Classics; directed by Michael Mayer with a screenplay by Stephen Karam, starring Annette Bening and Saoirse Ronan.

A contemporary Afrikaans language film adaptation directed by Christiaan Olwagen, titled Die Seemeeu, debuted at the Kyknet Silwerskermfees on 23 August 2018. Cintaine Schutte won the Best Supporting Actress award for her portrayal of Masha.

=== Opera ===
The play was the basis for the 1974 opera The Seagull by Thomas Pasatieri to an English libretto by Kenward Elmslie.

=== Musical ===
The 1987 musical Birds of Paradise by Winnie Holzman and David Evans is a metatheatrical adaptation, both loosely following the original play and containing a musical version of the play as the Konstantin equivalent's play.

In 2015, the play was adapted into Songbird, a country musical by Michael Kimmel and Lauren Pritchard. Songbird sets its story in Nashville and centers around Tammy Trip, a fading country star. Tammy returns to the honky tonk where she got her start to help her estranged son launch his own music career. The show was produced at 59E59 Theaters and featured Kate Baldwin and Erin Dilly. It was recognized as a New York Times Critic's Pick.

=== Ballet ===
It was made into a ballet by John Neumeier with his Hamburg Ballet company in June 2002. This version re-imagined the main characters as coming from the world of dance. Arkadina became a famous prima ballerina, Nina was a young dancer on the brink of her career. Konstantin appeared as a revolutionary young choreographer and Trigorin as an older, more conventional choreographer.

An earlier ballet in two acts, by Russian composer Rodion Shchedrin, was first performed at the Bolshoi Theatre, Moscow, in 1980.
