= William Armstrong (theatre director) =

Armstrong, sketched in the Liverpool Daily Post, 1939

William Armstrong, CBE (30 November 1882 – 5 October 1952) was a British actor, theatre manager and director, associated for many years with the Liverpool Playhouse, where as director he was an important influence on young actors in his company, including, at various times, Robert Donat, Robert Flemyng, Rex Harrison, Michael Redgrave and Diana Wynyard.

== Life and career ==
Armstrong was born in Edinburgh and studied music at Edinburgh University, but after teaching for some years he chose a theatrical career in preference to a musical one. He made his professional stage debut with Sir Frank Benson's company at the Shakespeare Memorial Theatre, Stratford-upon-Avon in 1908. He made his first London appearance the following year in Julius Caesar. Subsequently he toured in Germany with Meta Illing's English company, and from 1910 to 1912 he was a member of the Glasgow Repertory Theatre Company, acting as assistant director to its founder, Alfred Wareing. In 1912–13 he toured the US in Arnold Bennett and Edward Knoblock's play Milestones. In September 1914, he joined the Liverpool Repertory Company. He moved on to the Birmingham Repertory Company in 1916, and from 1917 to 1919 toured army camp theatres. In September 1920, he was with the Everyman Theatre repertory company, and in 1922 he toured with Mrs Patrick Campbell in Hedda Gabler, and appeared in the West End in the English-language premiere of Six Characters in Search of an Author.

Armstrong had made a strong impression in Liverpool, and when, in 1922, the company was in financial trouble and in need of an effective young director he was invited to take the post. His obituarist in The Times wrote:

[H]is skill in play selection and production, his eye for good acting, and his happy combination of enterprise and prudence in business managemenl commended him more and more to the supporters of repertory. He put on a very varied list of significant pieces by modern British dramatists … The Playhouse under his management enlisted and trained actors and actresses with extraordinary success, so that in time the West End stage was full of its graduates – of whom Diana Wynyard, Richard Bird, and Robert Donat are typical names.

Other future stars who learned their craft at the Playhouse under Armstrong included Michael Redgrave, Rex Harrison and Robert Flemyng.

Armstrong remained in charge at the Playhouse until 1944, when poor health led him to step down. Between 1941 and 1945 he produced several plays in London, including The Rivals with Edith Evans as Mrs Malaprop. In 1945 he joined Sir Barry Jackson at the Birmingham Repertory as assistant director. He resigned in 1947 because of ill-health and spent the winter of that year in South Africa. He returned to London in 1948, and directed the production at the St James's Theatre of Sacha Guitry's Don't Listen, Ladies with Constance Cummings, Denholm Elliott, Francis Lister and Betty Marsden. He was created a CBE in 1951.

Armstrong died at his home near Birmingham aged 69.

== References and sources ==
=== Sources ===
- Parker, John, ed. (1922). Who's Who in the Theatre (fourth ed.). London: Sir Isaac Pitman and Sons. OCLC 473894893.
- Parker, John, ed. (1925). Who's Who in the Theatre (fifth ed.). London: Sir Isaac Pitman and Sons. OCLC 10013159.
- Rowell, George (1984). The Repertory Movement: A History of Regional Theatre in Britain. Cambridge and New York: Cambridge University Press. ISBN 978-0-521-23739-0.
