= Paul Vincent Carroll =

Irish dramatist and writer (1900–1968)

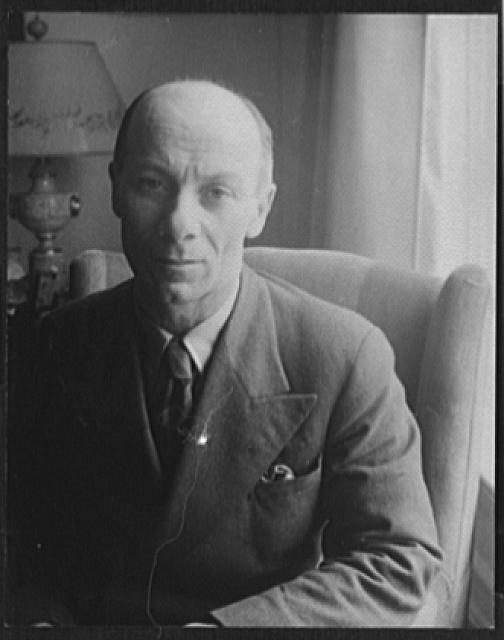
Paul Vincent Carroll (1944) Photo by Carl Van Vechten

Paul Vincent Carroll (10 July 1900 – 20 October 1968) was an Irish dramatist who wrote over 60 plays.

Carroll was born in Blackrock in County Louth, on the east coast of Ireland, and received his degree in history from University College, Dublin (UCD), and settled in Glasgow in 1920. Several of his plays were produced by the Abbey Theatre in Dublin and on Broadway stages. He won two New York Drama Critic's Awards.

== Work as a dramatist ==
Carroll's plays were about Catholicism in Ireland. Himself a devout Catholic, he nonetheless criticised several aspects of Catholic life in rural Ireland and the idiosyncracies of some clergy. Beyond plays, he also wrote short stories, movie scenarios, and television scripts.

He co-founded in 1932 with Grace Ballantine and Molly Urquhart the Curtain Theatre Company in Glasgow, Scotland, and of The Citizens Theatre in the same city. He served as playwright in residence in both.

Carroll's play Green Cars Go East, about a young schoolteacher from the Glasgow slums who encourages her brothers to follow her path towards middle-class respectability, was first performed by the Glasgow Players under the direction of Robert Mitchell at the Lyric Theatre in Glasgow on 30 November 1937.

His play Shadow and Substance won the New York Drama Critic's Award (1938) and The White Steed won the same award in 1939. Critic John Gassner described these as enjoying the status of "best Irish plays" for the next twenty years. Fearing that The White Steed was too anti-clerical for its audience, the Abbey Theatre rejected the play after the writer had finished it in 1938. Audiences at New York's John Golden Theatre, however, found it excellent. Hurt by the Dublin theatre's rejection, Carroll published a dismissal of his former colleagues in a 1939 newspaper publication as "self-appointed magistrates of the arts … some of whom hate the living theatre and fear its full and true interpretive expression." The White Steed went on to enjoy a successful run on Broadway, where it won Carroll a second New York Drama Critics Award.

The Wayward Saint is about an Irish priest who emulates St. Francis of Assisi. It opened at the Cort Theatre in New York in 1955 and closed after 21 performances, a run which critics considered a success.

In 1959, Helena Carroll, the playwright's daughter, organised another production of Shadow and Substance (1937) in New York's Tara Theatre; she played the lead role of Brigid.

In 1972, Carroll's work was the subject of the first issue of The Journal of Irish Literature.

== Personal life ==
After graduating from St Patrick’s Training College, he first worked in Dundalk as a teacher; his father had been one. He soon left the small school and taught for sixteen years in Glasgow. Carroll and his wife, clothing designer Helena Winifred Reilly (1903–1957), married in Glasgow in 1923 and had three daughters; the youngest was actress Helena Carroll. Paul Vincent Carroll died at age 68 in Bromley, Kent, England.

== Works (selection) ==
- The Things That are Caesar's (London, 1934).
- Shadow and Substance (1937, won the Casement Award and the New York Drama Critics' Circle Award).
- The White Steed (1939, won Drama Critics’ Circle Award).
- The Strings Are False (1942, published as The Strings My Lord Are False, 1944).
- Coggerers (1944, later renamed The Conspirators).
- The Old Foolishness (1944).
- The Wise Have Not Spoken (1947).
- Saints and Sinners 1949.
- She Went by Gently (1953, *Irish Writing* magazine. Republished in 1955 in 44 Irish Short Stories edited by Devin A. Garrity).
- The Wayward Saint (1955).
