= Linmill Stories =

Short story cycle

Linmill Stories is the title of a short story cycle written by the playwright Robert McLellan in the Scots language. He began writing the stories in 1939, publishing some of them piecemeal and separately throughout the post-war years until, in the 1960s, the whole cycle was broadcast on radio in Scotland to great critical acclaim. A selection of the stories was published in 1977 as Linmill and Other Stories. The complete cycle was eventually gathered and published posthumously in 1990.

The short stories were inspired by McLellan's childhood in Linmill, Kirkfieldbank. They present a "boy's-eye view of the world".

Modern writing in Scots is relatively rare and predominantly focussed on poetry and dramatic dialogue. McLellan's achievement in fine Scots prose is generally seen, alongside that of William Laughton Lorimer, as being the most important of the mid-twentieth century period.
