= You Never Can Tell (play) =

Play by George Bernard Shaw

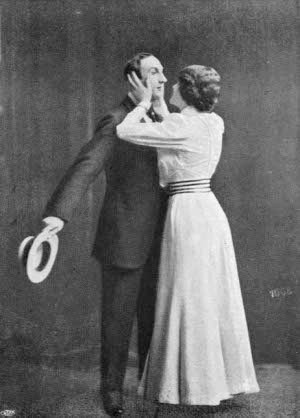
- Olof and Frida Winnerstrand on stage 1908, as Valentine and Gloria
- Original language: English
- Written by: Bernard Shaw
- Subject: A dentist falls in love and a family accidentally meet the father they have never known
- Genre: Comedy
- Setting: A seaside town

Premiere
- Date: 26 November 1899
- Place: Royalty Theatre, by the Stage Society

You Never Can Tell is an 1897 four-act play by Bernard Shaw that debuted at the Royalty Theatre. It was published as part of a volume of Shaw's plays entitled Plays Pleasant.

== Characters and original casts ==
| Role | 1899 | 1900 | 1905 |
|---|---|---|---|
| Valentine, dentist | Yorke Stephens | Yorke Stephens | Harley Granville-Barker |
| Gloria Clandon, the eldest daughter | Margaret Halstan | Mabel Terry-Lewis | Tita Brand |
| Walter (aka William), the waiter | James Welch | James Welch | Louis Calvert |
| Dolly Clandon, twin to Philip | Winifred Fraser | Audrey Ford | Sydney Fairbrother |
| Philip Clandon, twin to Dolly | Roland Bottomley | W. Graham Browne | Norman Page |
| Mrs Clandon, the mother | Elsie Chester | Elsie Chester | Mrs Theodore Wright |
| Fergus Crampton, the landlord and father | Hermann Vezin | Hermann Vezin | J. D. Beveridge |
| Finch McComas, a solicitor | Sydney Warden | George Raiemond | J. H. Barnes |
| Bohun, QC (Queen's Counsel) | Charles Charrington | Charles Charrington | Nigel Playfair |
| Parlor-maid | Mabel Hardinge | Alice Powell | Hazel Thompson |
| Jo, another waiter | Edward Knoblauch | Leopold Profeit | — |

The premiere, on 26 November 1899, was produced under the direction of James Welch. This was a one-off private performance. The play was not presented in public until 1900 when six matinee performances were given at the Strand Theatre. The first run of evening and matinee performances was at the Court Theatre in 1905.

== Plot ==
The play is set in a seaside town and tells the story of Mrs Clandon and her three children, Dolly, Phillip and Gloria, who have just returned to England after an eighteen-year stay in Madeira.

The children have no idea who their father is and, through a comedy of errors, end up inviting him to a family lunch. At the same time, a dentist named Valentine has fallen in love with the eldest daughter, Gloria, who considers herself a modern woman and claims to have no interest in love or marriage.

The play continues with a comedy of errors and confused identities, with the friendly and wise waiter, Walter (most commonly referred to by the characters as "William," because Dolly thinks he resembles Shakespeare), dispensing his wisdom with the titular phrase "You Never Can Tell."

== Setting ==
Time: One Day in August 1896

Place: An English seaside resort

Act I
A dentist's operating room
Act II
The Terrace of the Marine Hotel
Act III
The Clandons' sitting room at the Marine Hotel
Act IV
The Clandons' sitting room at the Marine Hotel – Later at night

== In performance ==
=== London revivals ===
- Savoy Theatre in 1907. Beveridge switched from the subordinate role of Crampton to play the waiter, and Playfair moved from the role of Bohun to that of McComas. Harcourt Williams, who forty years later played the waiter, came into the cast as Valentine. Dorothy Minto played Dolly.
- Garrick Theatre in 1920, with Louis Calvert as the waiter and Lady Tree and her daughter Viola Tree as Mrs and Miss Clandon.
- Little Theatre in 1927 with Esmé Percy as Valentine.
- Westminster Theatre in 1938.
- Wyndham's Theatre in 1947 with Harcourt Williams as the waiter and a cast including Ernest Thesiger, James Donald, D. A. Clarke-Smith and Brenda Bruce. This revival ran for 312 performances.
- Haymarket Theatre in 1966, with:
  - Valentine – Keith Baxter
  - Gloria Clandon – Angela Thorne
  - Walter (aka William) – Ralph Richardson
  - Dolly Clandon – Celia Bannerman
  - Philip Clandon – James Hunter
  - Mrs Clandon – Judy Campbell
  - Fergus Crampton – Harry Andrews
  - Finch McComas – Cyril Luckham
  - Bohun – Moray Watson
  - Jo – Malcolm Reid

=== Other productions ===
The play was staged at the Royalty Theatre, Glasgow, during the first season of the Glasgow Repertory Theatre in April 1909.

You Never Can Tell has also been performed at the Shaw Festival, Niagara-on-the-Lake, Ontario several times: in 1963, 1973, 1979, 1988, 1995, 2005 and most recently in 2015.

== Adaptations ==
=== Radio ===
The BBC broadcast a production on 31 July 1971 starring Freddie Jones as William the Waiter, Prunella Scales as Gloria Clandon, Denys Hawthorne as Valentine, Godfrey Kenton as Mr Crampton, Jo Manning Wilson as Dolly, Lockwood West as Mr McComas and Nigel Anthony as Philip.

The CBC broadcast a production in 1973 with Frances Hyland as Mrs Clandon, Tony Van Bridge as Mr Crampton, Chris Wiggins as William the Waiter, Maureen Fitzgerald as Gloria, Drew Russell as Valentine and William Osler as Mr Bohun.

Another BBC production was broadcast on 29 September 2013 directed by Martin Jarvis and starring Ian Ogilvy as William the Waiter, Jamie Bamber as Valentine, Christopher Neame as Mr Crampton, Moira Quirk as Dolly, Adam Godley as Mr McComas and Rosalind Ayres as Mrs Clandon.

=== Television ===
BBC Television broadcast the Birmingham Repertory Company's production in 1955, with Redmond Phillips as the waiter and Richard Pasco as Valentine; others in the cast included Alan Rowe, Jack May, Bernard Hepton and Alan Bridges.

A second BBC television production was made in 1977, with Cyril Cusack as the waiter and Robert Powell as Valentine. Also in the cast were Richard Everett, Judy Parfitt, Kika Markham, Patrick Magee, Ernest Clark and Warren Clarke.

== Influence ==
Shaw's play was a considerable influence on the young Noël Coward, who acknowledged that he drew on it heavily in his early (1920) play The Young Idea. Concerned that his characters Gerda and Sholto were too similar to the twins Dolly and Philip in Shaw's comedy, Coward arranged for Shaw to be sent a copy of his new play. Shaw made numerous helpful suggestions but advised Coward "never to see or read my plays. Unless you can get clean away from me you will begin as a back number, and be hopelessly out of it when you are forty".

== Sources ==
- Gaye, Freda, ed. (1967). Who's Who in the Theatre (fourteenth ed.). London: Sir Isaac Pitman and Sons. OCLC 5997224.
- Holroyd, Michael (1997). Bernard Shaw: The One-Volume Definitive Edition. London: Chatto & Windus. ISBN 978-0-7011-6279-5.
- Parker, John, ed. (1939). Who's Who in the Theatre (ninth ed.). London: Sir Isaac Pitman and Sons. OCLC 473894893.
- Wearing, J. P. (1976). The London Stage, 1890–1899: A Calendar of Plays and Players. Metuchen: Scarecrow Press. ISBN 0810809109.
- Wearing, J. P. (1981). The London Stage, 1900–1909: A Calendar of Plays and Players. Metuchen: Scarecrow Press. ISBN 081081403X.
