= Kirkfieldbank =

Coordinates: 55.675435°N 3.802829°W

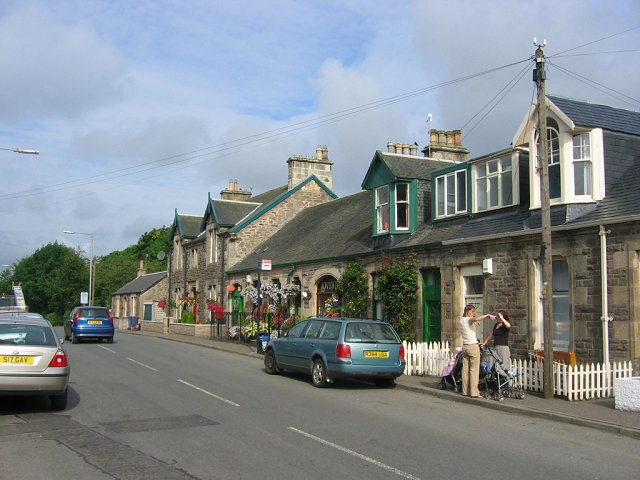
- Riverside Road, Kirkfieldbank

- Location within South Lanarkshire
- Population: 950 (2020)
- OS grid reference: NS867439
  - Edinburgh: 34 miles (55 km)
  - London: 385 miles (620 km)
- Community council: Clyde Valley
- Council area: South Lanarkshire
- Lieutenancy area: Lanarkshire
- Country: Scotland
- Sovereign state: United Kingdom
- Post town: LANARK
- Postcode district: ML11
- Dialling code: 01555
- Police: Scotland
- Fire: Scottish
- Ambulance: Scottish
- UK Parliament: Lanark and Hamilton East
- Scottish Parliament: Clydesdale

Kirkfieldbank is a small village and parish in Scotland, on the banks of the River Clyde. It is close to the town of Lanark and is part of the current South Lanarkshire local authority. The village of New Lanark is also close by, some ten minutes drive upstream.

The fertile Clyde Valley lands surrounding Kirkfieldbank are noted for their fruit farms, many with greenhouses specialising in tomatoes. One of these, Linmill Farm, which in former times specialised in soft fruit, was the birthplace of the dramatist and writer Robert McLellan (1907-1985). His Linmill Stories, a cycle of short stories written in homage to the summers he spent there as a child, strongly evokes the places and people in and around Kirkfieldbank in the period immediately before the First World War, as well as skilfully employing the rich, evocative Lanarkshire Scots spoken in the area at the time.

Kirkfieldbank has a school, a kirk, and two bridge crossings; the old brig, built in 1699, designed by James Lockhart, and a newer one constructed to carry modern traffic. The views from the bridges are picturesque. A caravan park is situated nearby.
