= Curtain Theatre (Glasgow) =

Coordinates: 55.8677°N 4.2754°W

Curtain Theatre was an influential amateur theatrical company active in Glasgow between 1933 and 1939. It was seminal in reviving theatrical culture in Scotland.

== Founding ==
Curtain Theatre was founded by Grace Ballantine, Molly Urquhart and Paul Vincent Carroll with the aim to support new Scottish writing for the stage and develop Scottish styles of performance at a time when Scotland's own native theatre traditions had been all but lost. It emerged from the dissolution of RF Pollock's short-lived Tron Theatre Club in 1932.

== Productions ==
In the seven years between 1933 and 1939, the Curtain produced a full annual programme of plays and launched the careers of a number of playwrights, actors and impresarios who would be influential to the rising Scottish drama of the twentieth century, most notably Paul Vincent Carroll, Robert McLellan and Duncan Macrae. One of its most famous productions was the premiere of McLellan's play, Jamie the Saxt. Its early productions were by subscription in a dedicated small studio theatre which the company established at a private address close to the city's University district. After 1935, productions were mounted in Glasgow's Lyric Theatre.

== Influence ==
Curtain Theatre in its original form folded soon after the outbreak of World War II, although one of its members opened the Park Theatre next door to what had been the Curtain Theatre. Although it was short-lived, the Curtain Theatre activities as a dynamic amateur company played a vitally important part in reviving theatrical culture in Scotland, giving new Scottish actors a home-grown base for developing Scottish self-expression in the theatre arts, and breaking open new paths in the movement which eventually led to the re-establishment of native professional theatre in the country in the 1940s.

== Sources ==
- Priscilla Barlow, Wise Enough to Play the Fool (Edinburgh, 1995)
- Donald Campbell, Playing for Scotland: A History of the Scottish Stage, 1715–1965, (Edinburgh, 1996)
- Bill Finlay, A History of Scottish Theatre (Edinburgh, 1998)
- David Hutchison, The Modern Scottish Theatre, (Glasgow, 1977)
