= Joe Corrie =

Scottish miner, poet and playwright

- Born: 13 May 1898; Slammanan, Stirlingshire, Scotland
- Died: 13 November 1968; Scotland
- Occupations: Miner and Playwright
- Writing career
- Language: Scots
- Notable work: In Time o' Strife (1926)
- Movement: Socialist

Joe Corrie (13 May 1894 – 13 November 1968) was a Scottish miner, poet, novelist and playwright best known for his radical, working class plays.

== Life ==
He was born in Slamannan, Stirlingshire in 1894. His family moved to Cardenden in the Fife coalfield when Corrie was still an infant. During his childhood he often missed school because of his family's straitened circumstances. He was introduced to drama through attendance of travelling theatre shows known as 'penny geggies'.

He started work at the Dundonald Colliery, near Lochgelly, in 1908 and resumed his education, attending Workers Educational Association (WEA) classes and frequenting the library at the local Miners' Welfare Institute. During the First World War, he was moved to the Mossblown Colliery on the Ayrshire coalfield in support of the war effort. After returning to Fife in the early 1920s, he took part in industrial action organised by the Fife Miners' Reform Union.

He died in Edinburgh in 1968.

== Writing ==
=== Poetry ===
Shortly after the First World War, Corrie started writing. His articles, sketches, short stories and poems were published in prominent socialist newspapers and journals, including Forward and The Miner.

Corrie's volumes of poetry include The Image o' God and Other Poems (1927), Rebel Poems (1932) and Scottish Pride and Other Poems (1955). T. S. Eliot wrote "Not since Burns has the voice of Scotland spoken with such authentic lyric note".

=== Drama ===
He turned to writing plays during the General Strike in 1926. His one-act plays and sketches were performed by the Bowhill Players, an amateur company of miners who performed to raise money for local soup kitchens. The company operated professionally as the Fife Miner Players in 1928-31 under the management of comedian and theatrical agent, Hugh Ogilvie. Corrie's first play, Hogmanay was published by the Fife Miners' Reform Union. His full-length play, In Time o' Strife, depicting the General Strike's effect on the Fife mining community, and described by literary scholar Alan Riach as showing exemplary 'defiance of the spirit', toured Fife mining villages and musical halls all over Scotland. In the spring of 2029, the company staged performances in Aberdeen, Coatbridge, Dundee, Dunfermline, Greenock, Kilmarnock, Leith, Mossend, Paisley, Stirling and Glasgow.

Corrie wrote at least six plays about Robert Burns: the full-length Robert Burns and five one-acts, The Rake o’Mauchline, A Man’s A Man; or, Burns Amang the Gentry, There Was a Lad, Clarinda, and Robert Burns and His Highland Mary, as well as a popular radio adaptation of Tam o’ Shanter that was performed and broadcast repeatedly for over forty years, and at least half a dozen radio programs for Burns Nights.

After the successes of 1929, the Fife Miner Players lost momentum and by 1931 they had disbanded. Corrie survived professionally by writing plays for working-class groups who took part in the Scottish Community Drama Association's annual competitive festivals. Winning plays included Martha (1935), And So To War (1936) and Hewers of Coal (1937). A novel, Black Earth, was published in 1939.

Corrie's commitment to naturalism invited strong criticism from the Scottish theatrical establishment in his day and caused him to feel disconnected from other Scottish writers. His work was staged professionally by the Scottish National Players and the Citizens' Theatre, Glasgow. Posthumously, the agitprop theatre group, 7:84 republished In Time o' Strife alongside a collection of writing and poems after their 1982 revival, which Alan Riach has said was met with 'new acclaim'.

=== Songs ===
Corrie also wrote songs and many of his poems have been set to music. Maid of Kenmore was recorded by Robert Wilson. Calum Kennedy recorded Kirsteen. Battlefield Band recorded settings by Alan Reid of The Image o' God, Miners Wives and I Am the Common Man. In 2013, The Joe Corrie Project: Cage Load of Men, a collection of poems set to contemporary and traditional music, was released.

== Legacy ==
The Corrie Centre community provision in Cardenden was named after Corrie in 1985.

On 24 November 1999, The Merchants o Renown presented The Image o' God, a celebration of the poetry and drama of Joe Corrie, including a performed reading of his one-act play, Martha, at the Netherbow Theatre, Edinburgh.

The 2012 feature film, The Happy Lands, was inspired by In Time o' Strife, being set in the same fictional village of Carhill.

In 2019, the University of St. Andrews released a biography of Corrie, as well as a guide to his archive and several academic essays in a new website marking the 50th anniversary of his death. This includes papers by Robert Crawford, Tom Hubbard, Willie Hershaw, Malcolm Petrie, Gavin Bowd, Sarah Leith, and Paul Malgrati.
