= Mary Stewart (play) =

- Written by: Robert McLellan
- Original language: Scots
- Subject: Mary, Queen of Scots

Premiere
- Date premiered: 1951
- Place premiered: Citizens Theatre

Mary Stewart is a five-act play written in Scots by the Scottish playwright Robert McLellan and produced in Glasgow in 1951 by the Citizens Theatre. The next production of the play took place in August 2014 at the Edinburgh Fringe, performed by Theatre Alba. Mary Stewart follows the life of the eponymous Mary, Queen of Scots.
