= Jamie the Saxt =

Jamie the Saxt is a four act play in Scots by the Scottish dramatist Robert McLellan. The play was first produced by Curtain Theatre in Glasgow in 1937 with the actor Duncan Macrae in the title role. The historical subject of the comedy is the conflict between the king of Scots, James VI, and Francis Stewart, the rebellious 5th Earl of Bothwell, in the early 1590s.

== Plot ==
The action of Jamie the Saxt, although a comedy, nevertheless follows attested events closely. McLellan sets each of the four acts at crucial dates in the historical record of the conflict between Francis Stewart, Earl of Bothwell, and the King of Scots beginning on the afternoon of the murder of James Stewart, 2nd Earl of Moray, 7 February 1591/2.

== Production history ==
The first performance of Jamie the Saxt was at the Lyric Theatre, Glasgow, on 31 March 1937. It was revived in 1953 and 1956.
