= The White Steed =

Play written by Paul Vincent Carroll

The White Steed is a play in three acts written in 1939 by Paul Vincent Carroll. It won the 1939 New York Drama Critics' Circle award for Best Foreign Play.

== Setting ==
The setting of the play is the present-day village of Lorcan, County Louth, Ireland.

== Original cast ==
The show was performed at the Cort Theatre and then moved to the John Golden Theatre. It ran all together for 136 performances. It was staged by Hugh Hunt, scenic design by Watson Barratt, general manager was Saul Abraham, and produced by Eddie Dowling.

- Florence Barratt as Meg Megee
- Leslie Bingham as Rosieanne
- Roland Bottomley as Donnacaidh McGoilla Phadraig
- George Coulouris as Father Shaughnessy
- Ralph Cullinan as Phelim Fintry
- Thomas P. Dillon as Inspector Toomey
- Barry Fitzgerald as Canon Matt Lavelle
- Elizabeth Malone as Brigid Brodigan
- Grace Mills as Sarah Hearty
- Farrell Pelly as Patrick Hearty
- Liam Redmond as Denis Dillon
- Jessica Tandy as Nora Fintry
- Tom Tully as Michael Shivers

== Later performances ==
The White Steed was presented on the televised series Play of the Week in 1959.
