= League of Dramatists =

The League of Dramatists in the United Kingdom was an organisation founded in 1931 by George Bernard Shaw under the aegis of the Society of Authors with the purpose to advocate on behalf of practising playwrights in Britain.
