= The Rocks Pop-up =

Temporary initiative in Sydney, Australia

The Rocks Pop-Up was an initiative for activating temporarily vacant buildings by providing creative workers with access to affordable space to produce and showcase original work, and host unique events while a long-term tenant is secured. The Rocks Pop-up supports emerging creative individuals and Organizations who wish to collaborate and exhibit work.

The Rocks Pop-Up project was created in March 2011 by the Sydney Harbour Foreshore Authority and Arts NSW (now Create NSW) with the following objectives:

- To present The Rocks as a showcase for unique, bespoke and locally distinctive work and the home of innovation and creativity in Sydney.
- To activate temporarily vacant properties and bring activity to the precinct.
- To support emerging creative workers with access to affordable space to make work, run creative businesses, sell original products and host unique events.
- To connect the broader arts and creative community with the tenants and residents.

The major outcomes of The Rocks Pop-Up project is raising the profile of The Rocks as a home of innovation and creativity in Sydney, attracting new and return visitors, and increasing the profile and exposure for artists.

The Authority re-launched The Rocks Pop-up in March 2012, providing the opportunity to artists and creative organisations to offer their services as producer, curator and programmer. In 2012, the participants included three arts organisations (ICE, Gaffa and the Red Room Company), eight creative organisations (Art in the Heart Lismore, FBi Radio and Artist Residency Program – ARP), and 90 individual creatives took part. An estimated 40,000 people visited the 12 sites provided.

Various type of events organised by The Rocks Pop-Up include Places + spaces, Cockatoo Calling Rocks, performances by emerging experimental musicians, Word Travels spoken word and literary performances, talks, walks, Organised Cacophony by New Media Curation and The Design Lab Sydney. Elaine Loebenstein presented "Silent Sound", a film screenings with live musical scores and many others events.
