= Glasgow Repertory Theatre =

Glasgow Repertory Theatre was a short-lived Scottish professional theatre founded in Glasgow in 1909 by Alfred Wareing. Its aim, directly inspired by the example of Dublin's Abbey Theatre (which had brought its first tour to Glasgow in 1907 with plays by J. M. Synge and W. B. Yeats), was to break Scotland's theatrical dependence on London. Over the previous thirty years, Scottish theatrical activity had been increasingly dominated by touring London companies using transport by rail to bring their productions north, a situation that had effectively contributed to the demise of the country's own stock theatre companies, which had had growing success in the mid-nineteenth century.

Starting with a season at the Royalty Theatre, Glasgow which commenced on 5 April 1909, Wareing created seasons of international European and English-language drama. The season opened with George Bernard Shaw's You Never Can Tell, followed by Henrik Ibsen's The Enemy of the People, and William Ernest Henley and Robert Louis Stevenson's Admiral Guinea. It continued into May with revivals of Arnold Bennett's Cupid and Common Sense and John Galsworthy's Strife and Sir Pertinax. The company also premiered Richard H.Powell's one-act farce, The White Dove, Catherine Roxburgh's The Convenient Lover, and Robert Bankier's Whose Zoo?, a satire on contemporary Glasgow life. In later seasons, Muddle Annie and The Autocrat of the Coffee Stall, one-act plays by the Anglo-American Harold Chapin, one of the young producers at the Rep, were staged at the Royalty.

Glasgow Repertory was the first theatre in Britain to produce a play by Chekhov (The Seagull). It was however less successful in its aim also to produce native Scottish drama, though its company did mount some productions of new Scottish work and, in 1909, Neil Munro's play Macpherson, deploying his popular comic character, Erchie MacPherson, was well received. Donald Colquhoun's play Jean, about a conflict between father and son on a small farm, was premiered by the company in 1910. One of the ironies of the company's existence was its rejection that year of Graham Moffat's Scots Language comedy The Causey Saint which, under the title Bunty Pulls the Strings, went on to become the box office smash hit of London's West End in 1911 and continued to win outstanding success on international tour.

Glasgow Repertory folded in the autumn of 1914 with the theatre closures which took effect in Britain in the weeks immediately after the start of World War I; this even though the company, in its final season, had broken even for the first time in financial terms.

Although short-lived, the practical legacy of the Glasgow Repertory was important. The company's residual funds were used in 1921 to establish the Scottish National Players, and memory of its 'national' aspirations continued to inspire a growing movement for Scottish theatrical revival in the inter-war years. When James Bridie eventually established Citizens' Theatre in 1943, his principal direct model was Wareing's Glasgow Repertory.

== Books ==
- Donald Campbell, Playing for Scotland, A History of the Scottish Stage 1715-1965 (Edinburgh, 1996)
- Bill Findlay (editor), A History of Scottish Theatre (Edinburgh, 1998)
