= Royalty Theatre, Glasgow =

Former theatre in Glasgow, Scotland

Coordinates: 55.865°N 4.255°W

The Royalty Theatre, Glasgow (later the Lyric Theatre) was a theatre in Glasgow at the corner of Sauchiehall Street and Renfield Street. It was built in 1879 as part of a development by the Central Halls Company chaired by David Rattray, and was one of the first theatre designs of Frank Matcham. In 1895 it was one of the four theatres brought together by Baillie Michael Simons of Glasgow in a new company Howard & Wyndham Ltd. The Royalty staged plays, opera, and musical comedy and in April 1909 became home to Alfred Wareing's Glasgow Repertory Company.

The author and journalist Neil Munro had an association with the Royalty Theatre. In his Erchie MacPherson story, "Jinnet's First Play", first published in the Glasgow Evening News on 24 October 1904, Munro has Erchie take his wife Jinnet to a production of Arthur Wing Pinero's play Letty at the Royalty. Five years later, in 1909, Erchie MacPherson featured as the main character in his play Macpherson, produced at the theatre by the Scottish Playgoers Association Ltd., of which Munro was by then a director.

The Royalty became the Lyric Theatre in 1914 when it was sold to the Young Men's Christian Association (YMCA), and staged troop entertainments during the First World War. In the 1920s, it became the base of the Scottish National Players, though Tyrone Guthrie, its then director, expressed frustration about its poorly equipped stage and having to share the space with other amateur companies.

Paul Vincent Carroll's play Green Cars Go East, about a young schoolteacher from the Glasgow slums who encourages her brothers to follow her path towards middle-class respectability, was first performed at the theatre by the Glasgow Players under the direction of Robert Mitchell on 30 November 1937.

The theatre was rebuilt after a fire in 1953 but demolished in 1959, and replaced by St. Andrew House, a large concrete office block, which is now an hotel.
