= Scottish National Players =

Scottish theatrical company

Scottish National Players, founded in Glasgow c.1920 by figures such as playwright John Brandane, was a non-professional touring theatre company which had the aim to pioneer the establishment of a Scottish National Theatre along the lines of the Irish model established by Dublin's Abbey Theatre around twenty years earlier. The company was founded using left-over funds from the short-lived Glasgow Repertory which had folded in 1914. Its first director was Andrew P. Wilson. It produced 141 plays between 1921 and 1940, and from 1947 to 1948.

The Scottish National Players performed early plays by James Bridie, such as The Sunlight Sonata and Brandane's The Glen is Mine, as well as an ill-fated production of Neil Gunn's drama The Ancient Fire. A number of its productions were directed by the young Tyrone Guthrie. Sometimes criticised for its conservatism, Scottish National Players notably turned down Joe Corrie's early masterpiece In Time o' Strife in 1927. On the other hand, it was instrumental in touring drama around local communities throughout Scotland. Throughout the 1920s and '30s, the company provided the BBC Scotland Region with plays for radio broadcast and actors for the BBC's own repertory companies and programmes of spoken verse. .

In the early 1930s, James Bridie, as one of the board members, attempted to push Scottish National Players to professionalise. Although remaining supportive, he resigned after the board chose to retain its amateur status. Soon after this decision, the company began to lose direction. It ceased production during the Second World War but was revived for a short period afterwards. Its last production, Robert Kemp's A Trump for Jericho, was staged in Lanark in 1947.
