= Timeline of BBC Two =

This is a timeline of the history of BBC Two.

== 1960s ==
=== 1962 ===
- The Pilkington Report on the future of broadcasting observed that ITV lacked any culturally relevant programming. It therefore decided that Britain's third television station should be awarded to the BBC.

=== 1963 ===
- 14 January – Michael Peacock is appointed the first Controller of the BBC's (forthcoming) second television channel. The designation of the new channel as BBC2 is also announced. Peacock is to assume his post on 4 February.

=== 1964 ===
- 4 January – Test transmissions begin for BBC2.
- 20 April – BBC2 starts broadcasting at 7:20pm, however, a power cut had affected its launch night. The first programme was the news bulletin.

The BBC Two ident from the channel's launch in 1964

- 21 April – The power had been restored to Television Centre and programming began with Play School at 11am and the launch schedule postponed from the night before was successfully shown that evening at 7:20pm, also in reference to the power cut, the transmission opened with a shot of a candle which was then blown out by presenter Denis Tuohy.
- 22 August – The first Match of the Day airs on BBC2. The programme moved to BBC1 from the start of the 1964-65 season
- 6 December – The channel goes on the air in the Midlands and East Anglia, because the Sutton Coldfield transmitter initially could not relay BBC2 beyond an area reception to the Midlands region, resulting in a staggered signal.
- 16 December – The first episode of The Likely Lads is broadcast.

=== 1965 ===
- 9 January – Not Only... But Also makes its debut on BBC2.
- 4 March – David Attenborough becomes the channel's new Controller in succession to Michael Peacock who becomes Controller of BBC1. Attenborough remains in this post until 1968.
- 2 May – Sunday Cricket is broadcast for the first time. The programme which runs throughout the afternoon features full coverage of a match "played under knock-out rules".
- 12 September – BBC2 Wales goes on the air. To introduce the service, BBC2 airs a programme titled BBC-2 Comes to Wales, featuring the Secretary of State for Wales James Griffiths, the Lord Mayor of Cardiff, the Deputy Mayor of Newport, Chairman of the Broadcasting Council for Wales Professor Glanmor Williams, David Attenborough and BBC2 Wales Controller Alun Oldfield-Davies.
- 4 October – BBC2 begins broadcasting across the Midlands.
- 31 October – BBC2 in the North of England goes on the air.
- November – BBC2 begins broadcasting across Southampton, Portsmouth, Bournemouth and the Isle of Wight.
- By the start of 1966, BBC2 is broadcasting in central Scotland and Yorkshire.

=== 1966 ===
- 1 January – The first edition of Rugby Special is broadcast, showing weekly highlights of rugby union matches.
- 15 January – BBC2 goes on the air in the South and West of England.
- 5 April – The Money Programme makes its debut on BBC2. It would run until 2010.
- 11 June – BBC2 Northern Ireland goes on the air.
- 9 July – BBC2 Scotland goes on the air, although much of England and some parts of Wales, Scotland and Northern Ireland still cannot receive the channel.
- 20 August – BBC2 begins showing a Midnight Movie on Saturday nights. The film airs through the midnight hour, offering an alternative to BBC1 and ITV as both those channels generally closed at around midnight.
- 2 October – The four-part drama Talking to a Stranger by John Hopkins, recounts a weekend's tragic events from the perspectives of each of the four main participants, begins airing as part of the Theatre 625 series. Two of the leads were Judi Dench and Maurice Denham.

=== 1967 ===
First BBC Two in colour ident from 1967

- 1 January – Debut of the BBC's adaptation of John Galsworthy's The Forsyte Saga on BBC2. The series concludes on 1 July.
- 1 July – BBC 2 becomes Europe's first colour TV broadcaster, showing about five hours of colour programming every week as part of a "launching period", starting with live coverage from the Wimbledon Championships. The full colour service would launch in December.
- 23 October – BBC2 airs the BBC's first bulletin of Service Information.
- 2 December – BBC 2 officially launches its full colour service with a special production of Billy Smart's Circus, at 6.30 pm. This occasion also marks the debut of a new logo and ident: the "cubed 2", which would be used in various forms until the end of 1974. Also shown this evening is the first episode of Vanity Fair, the first drama serial by the BBC to be produced in colour.

=== 1968 ===
- 2 September – The Morecambe & Wise Show makes its debut. The comedy duo had contracted to the BBC to be able to broadcast in colour.

=== 1969 ===
- 23 February – The first episode of Civilisation, written and presented by art historian Kenneth Clark, airs. The thirteen-part series concludes in May.
- 24 March – Debut of the surreal comedy sketch show Q, written by Spike Milligan and Neil Shand and also starring Milligan.

== 1970s ==
=== 1970 ===
- 1 January – The first episode of The Six Wives of Henry VIII airs with Keith Michell in the lead. The six-part series is a sequence of television plays written by six writers.

=== 1971 ===
- 3 January – The first Open University broadcast is aired on BBC2.
- 17 February – BBC2 airs Elizabeth R, a drama serial of six 85-minute plays starring Glenda Jackson in the title role.
- 21 September – The Old Grey Whistle Test makes its debut on BBC2.

=== 1972 ===
- 8 January – Ways of Seeing, a four-part series written and presented by John Berger, begins.
- 12 November – The first episode of America: A Personal History of the United States, a thirteen-part series written and presented by Alistair Cooke, airs.

=== 1973 ===
- 5 May – The Ascent of Man, written and presented by Jacob Bronowski, begins its thirteen-part run.
- 24 August – BBC2 airs a trade test colour film for the final time, having done so during daytime closedowns to provide colour broadcasting in these intervals for use by television shops and engineers (the 'trade') to adjust their television sets.

=== 1974 ===
- 30 January – BBC2 shows the first early morning Open University programming, airing between 6:40am and 7:30am.
- 22 February – BBC2 airs the drama Girl as part of its Second City Firsts anthology series. It tells the story of an affair between two army officers which is the first on British television to feature a gay kiss, between two women.
- 5 December – Party Political Broadcast, the final episode of Monty Python's Flying Circus, airs on BBC2.
- 28 December – BBC2 launches a new ident known as the Striped 2.

=== 1975 ===
- January – When not showing actual programmes, BBC2 begins to fully close down on weekdays between 11:30am and 4pm and continues to do so until September 1983.
- 20 January – Due to the decision to fully close down the network during the day, Service Information is now broadcast once a day, at 10.30am, rather than three times a day.
- 22 January–26 February – Drama series The Love School, about the Pre-Raphaelite Brotherhood is shown on BBC2.
- 19 September – The much-loved comedy series Fawlty Towers makes its debut on BBC2. The second series would air four years later coincidental to it moving to BBC1.
- 1 October – The first episode of the long-running documentary series Arena airs.

=== 1976 ===
- 20 September – The twelve-part serial I, Claudius begins.

=== 1977 ===
- 25 October – The first series of Ripping Yarns, written by Michael Palin and Terry Jones, begins. A pilot episode aired in January 1976.
- 22 December – Count Dracula airs on BBC2, starring Louis Jourdan in a television adaptation of the Bram Stoker novel. It was directed by Philip Saville.

=== 1978 ===
- 6 April – The four-part drama series Law & Order begins airing on BBC2. Each of the four stories within the series is told from a different perspective, including that of the Detective, the Villain, the Brief and the Prisoner. The series proves to be controversial at the time due to its depiction of a corrupt British law enforcement and legal system.
- 13 July – The original series of Top Gear begins airing on BBC2, having started as a locally produced programme at BBC Pebble Mill the previous year.
- 31 October – Empire Road first airs. It was, according to the BFI's Screenonline website, "the first serious attempt at a long-running drama on British television addressing Britain's growing multi-racial society." It runs for sixteen episodes over two series ending in October 1979.

=== 1979 ===
- 2 January – BBC2 airs the first episode of Michael Wood's documentary history series, In Search of the Dark Ages.
- 23 June – BBC2 launches the world's first computer-generated ident, the BBC Two 'Computer Generated 2'.
- 25 October – The final episode of the comedy series Fawlty Towers airs on BBC2.

== 1980s ==
=== 1980 ===
- 28 January – The first edition of Newsnight airs on BBC2. Its launch had been delayed by four months by the Association of Broadcasting Staff, at the time the main BBC trade union.
- 25 February – The first episode of the political sitcom Yes Minister, "Open Government", airs on BBC2.
- March – The first in-vision Ceefax transmissions air. These consist of 30-minute transmissions that BBC2 airs on weekdays between 10am and 10:30am and between 3:30pm and 4pm.
- 6 September – BBC2 launches a computer generated clock, probably the first of its kind in the world.

=== 1981 ===
- 5 January – The Hitchhiker's Guide to the Galaxy, the television version of Douglas Adams' radio comedy of the same name makes its debut on BBC2.
- 20 January – BBC2 airs live coverage of the inauguration of Ronald Reagan as the 40th President of the United States.
- 17 May – Sunday Grandstand launches. It airs during the Summer months on BBC2. The programme also includes weekly coverage of Sunday Cricket that has been shown on BBC2 since 1965.
- 23 October – The last ever teatime block of Open University programmes airs. From 1982 onwards, only a single Open University programme airs and is billed in TV listings as a general programme rather than an Open University programme. This allows BBC2 to begin weeknight programmes at 5:35pm throughout the year instead of just before 7pm. The displaced OU programmes are moved to a late night slot, airing after the conclusion of regular programmes.
- November – BBC2 starts its weekdays at the earlier time of 3:55pm.

=== 1982 ===
- 15 April – BBC2's start time moves to the later time of 5:10pm with transmissions beginning with a single Open University programme with regular programmes now beginning at 5:40pm.
- 1 October – BBC2’s weekday daytime four-hour transmitter shutdown is suspended for the next four months. This is to assist riggers adjust aerials during the lead up to, and the launch of, Channel 4.
- 10 October – Boys from the Blackstuff makes its debut on BBC2 with the last episode shown on 7 November.
- 9 November – The first episode of the anarchic sitcom The Young Ones starring Rik Mayall, airs on BBC2.
- 23 December – At 10:30am, Service Information airs on BBC2 for the final time.

=== 1983 ===
- 7 February – The four-hour weekday transmitter shutdown resumes.
- 2 May – From this day, Ceefax pages air during all daytime downtime, although BBC2 continues to fully close down for four hours after Play School ends.
- 27–28 August – BBC2 Rocks Around the Clock by airing non-stop music programmes all day and also all night.
- 16 September
  - Play School airs on BBC2 for the final time.
  - BBC2 closes down during the day for the final time, all future daytime downtime is filled by Pages from Ceefax.
- 19 September – Daytime on Two launches on BBC2. Airing during term-time from just after 9am until 3pm, the strand encompasses the BBC Schools programming previously shown on BBC1 and the BBC's adult educational programmes which are shown at lunchtime. A special version of the BBC2 'Computer Generated 2' ident is launched to introduce the programmes.
- 5 December – Following the end of the Daytime on Two term, Ceefax is shown non-stop throughout the day on BBC2 for the first time with transmissions running continuously from around 9am until the start of programmes at 5:35pm.

=== 1984 ===
- 28–29 July – BBC2 hosts Jazz on a Summer's Day, a weekend of programmes devoted to jazz music.
- 25–26 August – For the second time, BBC2 airs Rock Around the Clock.
- 23 September – The single TV drama play Threads airs on BBC2. It was repeated on 1 August 1985 on BBC2 as part of the After the Bomb series.
- 5 October – BBC2 airs an Open University programme at teatime for the final time.
- 8 October – BBC2 launches a full afternoon service, consisting primarily of repeats of Dallas and old feature films.
- December – BBC2 stops airing a late evening Saturday night news summary, meaning that they now only air a single 15-minute news and sport bulletin on Saturdays.

=== 1985 ===
- 6 January – The first Screen Two broadcast takes place.
- 7 January – The BBC ends its experiment with afternoon broadcasting and from this date Ceefax pages are shown continuously on BBC2 between 9am and 5:25pm apart from when Daytime on Two is in season and when sporting events are being shown.
- 11 January – Victoria Wood as Seen on TV makes its debut on BBC2.
- 18 February – BBC2 Wales launches at the same time as BBC1's COW (Computer Originated World, a computer generated globe) and when BBC Wales TV becomes BBC1 Wales.
- 10 April – An eight-part dramatisation of Charles Dickens' novel Bleak House begins.
- 28 April – The World Snooker Championship Final between Dennis Taylor and Steve Davis draws BBC2's highest ever rating of 18.5 million viewers.
- 13 July – Live Aid pop concerts are held in Philadelphia and London and televised around the world. Over £50 million is raised for famine relief in Ethiopia. BBC2 shows the London concert with the Philadelphia concert shown on BBC1.
- 27 July – BBC2 airs "Blues Night", an Arena special dedicated to the Blues and featuring artists from the genre, including Sonny Boy Williamson, B. B. King, Blind John Davis and Big Bill Broonzy.
- 30 July – Debut of the pop music culture series No Limits on BBC2.
- 31 July – The War Game, made for the BBC's The Wednesday Play strand in 1965 but banned from broadcast at the time is finally shown on television as part of BBC2's After the Bomb season.
- 6 September – The weekly regional programmes slot moves to BBC2, airing at 8pm on Fridays. They had previously been shown late in the evening on BBC1.

=== 1986 ===
- 30 March – BBC2 launches the TWO ident which features the red, green and blue pieces a year and a half prior to the launch of their new corporate logo and airs until 16 February 1991.
- 21 May – A Very Peculiar Practice makes its debut on BBC2.
- 2 September – Ahead of the launch of all-day television on BBC1, the weekly magazine programme for Asian women, Gharbar transfers back to BBC2. It moves to a new day and a new slot, 9am on Tuesdays.
- 9 September – The last ever non-stop all-day BBC2 Ceefax transmission takes place.
- 20–21 September – For the third and final time, BBC2 goes Rock Around the Clock.
- Autumn – BBC2 launches regional versions of Rugby Special so that each nation can receive full coverage of games from their country.
- 14 October – BBC2 begins regular late afternoon programming by showing a film during the second half of the gap between the end of Daytime on Two and the start of the evening's programmes.
- 17 October – BBC2 airs a teatime news summary with subtitles for the final time. For the past three years, this bulletin which had aired at around 5:25pm, had been the first programme of the day, apart from educational programmes and sports coverage.
- 27 October – The BBC launches its daytime television service and BBC2 provides a full afternoon service for the first time. However, when Daytime on Two was not being shown, BBC2 continues to air Pages from Ceefax and does not start airing until 2pm. It wasn't until 1989 that BBC2 started to show morning programmes when Daytime on Two was not on the air.
- 8 December – Six weeks after launching its daytime service, the BBC starts airing hourly news summaries. BBC2 airs three early afternoon bulletins at 2pm, 3pm and 3:50pm with the latter being followed by the mid-afternoon regional news summary which had been transferred from BBC1 on 27 October. Each bulletin is followed by a weather forecast.

=== 1987 ===
- 28 April – BBC television programming in Hindi and Urdu finishes after more than twenty years following the airing of the final edition of Gharbar. It is replaced by a new English language programme for the Asian community, Network East in July.
- 22 June – The BBC's lunchtime children's block moves from BBC1 to BBC2. It is shown slightly earlier at 1:20pm.
- 25 July – The BBC's new programme for the Asian community, Network East, launches. The 40 minute show airs on Saturday afternoons.
- 30 September – Malcolm McKay's screenplay The Interrogation of John, a film concerning the police questioning of a potential murder suspect makes its debut on BBC2. Starring Dennis Quilley, Bill Paterson and Michael Fitzgerald, it later forms the first of a three-part series titled A Wanted Man which further develops the story and airs in 1989.
- 11 October – A new Sunday morning children's strand called Now on Two launches. It airs between October and January during the Open University off-season.
- 31 December – BBC2 airs a 5-hour Whistle Test special to welcome in 1988. It aired from 9:35pm on New Year's Eve to 2:55am on New Year's Day and takes a look back through the archives in what is the programme's final outing until 31 years later in 2018 before a new edition airs.

=== 1988 ===
- 15 February – Red Dwarf makes its debut on BBC2.
- 25 March – BBC2 airs Two of Us, a gay-themed television film. It was produced as part of the BBC Schools SCENE series and intended for young adults. It confronted the Thatcherite government's attempt to ban gay sex education in schools via the controversial and since repealed section 28 legislation. Given this backdrop, the BBC opted not to show it during the day and it aired late at night on this day, even though it was originally created for a school audience. In 1990, the play was finally shown during the day when it aired in a lunchtime slot.
- 9 May – The youth strand DEF II is launched on BBC2.
- 11 June – The Nelson Mandela 70th Birthday Tribute concert is staged at Wembley Stadium, London, which was broadcast to 67 countries and an audience of 600 million.
- 16 September – BBC2 airs programmes for the Open University on weekday lunchtimes for the final time.

=== 1989 ===
- 16 January – The Late Show, Britain's first daily television arts programme which is presented by Sarah Dunant, makes its debut on BBC2, immediately after Newsnight.
- 20 January – BBC2 airs live coverage of the inauguration of George Bush as the 41st President of the United States.
- 2 March – First airing of My Brother David, an edition of the BBC2 schools series Scene in which Simon Scarboro talks about the life of his brother, David Scarboro who originally played the EastEnders character Mark Fowler who fell to his death from Beachy Head in 1988. The programme is repeated on 19 June for a general audience as part of BBC2's DEF II strand.
- 21 April – BBC2's 25th anniversary. Programming includes an edition of Arena in which the author Graham Greene sets out to trace a namesake who posed as him for many years and an edition of The Late Show which looks at the early BBC2 jazz programme Jazz 625.
- 19 June
  - For the first time, BBC2 airs during the morning when not showing Daytime on Two with weekday programmes beginning at 10am, as opposed to lunchtime.
  - My Brother David, first shown on 2 March, is repeated as part of BBC2's DEF II strand.
- 25 September – BBC2 airs The Interrogation of John, Malcolm McKay's 1987 screenplay starring Dennis Quilley, Bill Paterson and Michael Fitzgerald. The film, about the police questioning a murder suspect that first aired in 1987, now forms the first of a three-part series titled A Wanted Man which further develops the story. The second part of the trilogy, The Secret, airs on 27 September with Shoreland concluding the series on 28 September.
- 4 October – Jeremy Paxman makes his first appearance as presenter of BBC2's Newsnight, he would host it until 2014.
- 7 October – For the first time, BBC2 broadcasts non-Open University programming on Saturday mornings. Previously, BBC2 had merely aired the testcard (and from 1983 Pages from Ceefax) during the Open University (OU) winter break. The off-season OU programmes are shown at 9am with mainstream programming airing after the end of the OU broadcast.
- 8 October – The Sunday morning children's block shown during the Open University off-season is expanded. It starts at 7.30am and is rebranded as Children's BBC Two.
- 21 November – Television coverage of proceedings in the House of Commons begins and the BBC's parliamentary coverage is shown on BBC2.
- 22 November – Following the commencement of televised coverage of the House of Commons the previous day, BBC2 launches a breakfast round-up of yesterday's proceedings. This is preceded by the 8am bulletin from Breakfast News. Previously, the only BBC2 breakfast output was programmes from the Open University. Their programmes continue to be shown on BBC2 at breakfast but in an earlier timeslot.

== 1990s ==
=== 1990 ===
- 2 February – The BBC Schools Scene gay-themed television film Two of Us is given its first daytime airing on BBC2. The channel had opted to show it late at night at the time of its previous airing in March 1988.
- 13 February – The American science fiction series Quantum Leap makes its British debut on BBC2.
- 14 April – BBC2 begins airing the 94-part 1988 Indian serial, Mahabharat, a dramatisation of the epic poem the Mahabharata. The programme is shown in Hindi with English subtitles.
- 3 October – The BBC Radio 1 comedy show The Mary Whitehouse Experience comes to television with a series on BBC2.
- 23 October – David Lynch's critically acclaimed serial drama Twin Peaks receives its British debut at 9pm on BBC2. The series is set in the small American town of the same name.
- 30 October – Debut of The Sentence, an eight-part BBC2 documentary series looking at life inside Glen Parva Young Offenders Institute near Leicester, Europe's largest prison of its type. It is the first time a television crew has been given access to the prison.
- 7 December – BBC2 airs Your Move, a pioneering interactive show in which the home audience are invited to play chess against grandmaster Jonathan Speelman using telephone voting to select each move.

=== 1991 ===
Logo used from 1991 to 1997

- 14 January – The American sitcom The Fresh Prince of Bel-Air airs in the UK for the first time, making its debut on BBC2 as part of the DEF II programming strand.
- 18 January – BBC2 airs a special edition of Arena in which playwright Arthur Miller meets ANC leader Nelson Mandela. In the film, Mandela talks for the first time about his life and experiences from a personal standpoint.
- 12 February – A year after the release of Nelson Mandela from prison, BBC2 airs an edition of its Assignment documentary strand in which journalist Donald Woods returns to South Africa to give his personal assessment of that country's future.
- 15 February – The BBC2 'TWO' ident appears for the final time after nearly five years in use.
- 16 February – BBC1 and BBC2 receive new idents, both generated from laserdisc and featuring the BBC corporate logo introduced in 1988. BBC1 features a numeral '1' encased in a globe and BBC2 features eleven idents based around a numeral '2'.
- 18 June – BBC2 airs the concluding episode of David Lynch's offbeat drama, Twin Peaks.
- 20 June – An edition of BBC2's The Late Show is the final programme to be broadcast from the BBC's Lime Grove Studios.
- 30 July – British debut of the Australian series for pre-schoolers Johnson and Friends on BBC2.
- 26 August – BBC2 airs a day of programmes paying tribute to the Lime Grove Studios which includes a remake of the 1950s soap opera The Grove Family featuring stars from the present day.
- 17 September – The comedy series Bottom, starring Rik Mayall and Adrian Edmondson, makes its debut on BBC2.
- 20 September – BBC2 begins a rerun of Gerry Anderson's 1960s series Thunderbirds. The classic show proves to be popular, leading to a shortage of Tracy Island toys in stores during the run up to Christmas 1991, something that prompts the children's series, Blue Peter to show viewers and their parents how to make their own Tracy Island model. An instruction sheet produced by the programme receives more than 100,000 requests.
- 21 December – BBC2 airs A Perfect Christmas, featuring the best of Christmas programming from the BBC archives. Shows include festive episodes of The Flower Pot Men, Dr. Finlay's Casebook and the 1986 Christmas Day episodes of EastEnders.
- 28 December – BBC2 airs Hail! Hail! Rock 'n' Roll, Taylor Hackford's acclaimed documentary celebrating Chuck Berry's 60th birthday with footage of two concerts from 1986.

=== 1992 ===
- 4 January – BBC2 airs Freddie Mercury: a Tribute, a special programme introduced by Elton John that celebrates the life and work of Freddie Mercury who died in November 1991.
- 21 January – BBC Select launches overnight on BBC1 and BBC2 as a subscription service showing specialist programmes for professionals including businessmen, lawyers, teachers and nurses. The service ends in 1995.
- 20 April – The Freddie Mercury Tribute Concert for AIDS Awareness, an open-air concert in tribute to the late Freddie Mercury, is held at London's Wembley Stadium. The concert airs on BBC2 in the UK and is televised worldwide.
- 31 August – BBC2 spends the evening in TV Hell.
- 8 October – BBC2 airs the first edition of Later... with Jools Holland. Artists and groups that featured are The Neville Brothers, The Christians, Nu Colours and D'Influence.
- 12 November – The first episode of Absolutely Fabulous, a sitcom written by and starring Jennifer Saunders, airs on BBC2. The series also features Joanna Lumley, Julia Sawalha, Jane Horrocks and June Whitfield. Subsequent series would air on BBC1.
- 28 December – As part of a theme night devoted to (rival) broadcaster Granada Television, BBC2 airs the first new edition of University Challenge in five years. The programme returns for a full series two years later, presented by Jeremy Paxman.
- 30 December – BBC2 airs Unplugged – Eric Clapton, in which Eric Clapton plays acoustic versions of some of his tracks.

=== 1993 ===
- 20 January – BBC2 airs live coverage of the inauguration of Bill Clinton as the 42nd President of the United States.
- 15 February – BBC2 airs Oprah Winfrey's interview with singer Michael Jackson.
- 4 April – Children's BBC begin to repeat the school drama Grange Hill from its first series in 1978 on Sunday mornings on BBC2 as part of the show's 15th anniversary celebrations. These repeats end in 1999 with series 16. Prior to the repeats, Rugrats begins airing on the same day.
- 17 April – Arena presents a new four-part series "Tales of Rock 'N' Roll" on BBC2, looking at the story of 4 rock songs of how they came about and the history behind them and who and what they involved. Starting with "Peggy Sue" who was tracked down in Sacramento, California to be found running her own drain-clearing company Rapid Rooter and then to be taken back to Lubbock, Texas to recall how she knew Buddy Holly and how her marriage to drummer Jerry Allison turned out. "Heartbreak Hotel" where the song came to be written after the two songwriters discovered an article about a suicide in a hotel in Miami after reading about it in the Miami Herald. "Walk on the Wild Side" looks at all the characters that were involved in the song and how Lou Reed used to spend time at Andy Warhol's studio, as they all did (Holly Woodlawn and Joe Dallesandro were the only ones still around to tell the tale) and Highway 61 Revisited which looked at Bob Dylan's roots and everything that was connected with U.S. Route 61. The series ran for four weeks on Saturday nights on 17 April, 24 April, 1 May and 8 May.
- 20 October – Kirsty Wark makes her debut as anchor on Newsnight.
- 26 December – The Wrong Trousers, the second short film starring Wallace and Gromit, airs on BBC2.
- 31 December – BBC2 airs the first Hootenanny, an annual New Year's Eve music show hosted by Jools Holland. The inaugural edition includes performances from Sting, the Gipsy Kings and Sly and Robbie.

=== 1994 ===
- 2 January – BBC2 begins a repeat run of the 1960s American series The Fugitive.
- 10 January – The Welsh language soap opera Pobol y Cwm makes its debut in the rest of the UK when BBC2 begins airing episodes daily from Mondays to Thursdays. The series was shown with English subtitles which aired for three months and on an experimental basis.
- 19 January – The Day Today, a comedy show that parodied news, current affairs and various documentaries created by Armando Iannucci and Chris Morris, makes its debut on BBC2. It also starred Doon Mackichan, Patrick Marber, David Schneider, Rebecca Front and Steve Coogan. Each episode is presented as a mock news programme and also relies on a combination of ludicrous and fictitious stories covered with a serious pseudo-professional attitude. The series ends on 23 February.
- 4 March – BBC2 begins airing Laurel Avenue, the acclaimed American miniseries that tells the story of an eventful weekend in the lives of an extended African-American family living in St. Paul, Minnesota. The second part aired on 5 March. and ends with the third part on 6 March.
- 16 April – BBC2 celebrates its 30th birthday (four days early) with an evening of programmes selected and introduced by former controller David Attenborough. Among them are episodes of Elizabeth R and The Barry Humphries Show, a 1967 documentary about politics in India and a new episode of Call My Bluff.
- 2 May – BBC2 airs Cry Freedom, Richard Attenborough's 1987 acclaimed drama about South African journalist Donald Woods.
- 23 May – The BBC2 youth strand DEF II comes to an end after six years.
- 27 August – BBC2 presents a night of programming dedicated to ATV.
- 17 September – BBC2 airs the first edition of Top of the Pops 2, a programme showing footage from present day editions of Top of the Pops, as well as material from the series archive.
- 19 September – BBC2 launches a weekday afternoon business, personal finance and consumer news programme Working Lunch which airs for 42 weeks per year.
- 21 September – University Challenge returns after a seven-year absence and two years after a special edition was shown, the revived series has Jeremy Paxman as host and would present it until 2023.
- 27 September – The comedy sketch series The Fast Show makes its debut on BBC2, starring Paul Whitehouse, Charlie Higson, Simon Day, Mark Williams, John Thomson, Caroline Aherne and Arabella Weir.
- 18 November – The Trial, a series of documentaries, makes its debut on BBC2. It is filmed largely inside Scottish courts in 1993 and early 1994. Filming of the series is possible because the Criminal Justice Act 1925, the legislation banning photography in British courts does not apply in Scotland.
- 17 December – BBC2 begins a season of films starring Burt Lancaster following his death in October. It opens with Elmer Gantry, a 1960 film in which he stars alongside Jean Simmons.

=== 1995 ===
- 29 January – BBC2 begins its weekly roundup of proceedings in the O. J. Simpson murder trial with The Trial of O. J. Simpson.
- 25 February – BBC2 airs a documentary about The Rev. W. Awdry called The Thomas the Tank Engine Man as part of their Bookmark series. It is narrated by Hilary Fortnam, Awdry's daughter and includes a look at Thomas merchandise, the success of Thomas, images from the original Railway Series books with stock narration by John Gielgud, interviews with several people such as The Reverend himself, fans of Thomas, Awdry's son Christopher, children's author and poet Michael Rosen, various people who worked on the books and toys, Brian Sibley who also wrote the Reverend's autobiography, the people behind the television broadcasts and the rights of Thomas in Japan and the producers of the television series Britt Allcroft and David Mitton, plus a special behind the scenes peek of the 100th episode "Thomas and the Special Letter" and the Reverend criticising the series 3 episode "Henry's Forest".
- 15 March – As part of the Modern Times series, BBC2 airs Death on Request a Dutch documentary showing a doctor giving a terminally-ill patient a lethal injection of drugs. The programme is criticised by groups opposed to euthanasia.
- 29 June – Debut of Gaytime TV, the BBC's first gay magazine programme. It would run until July 1999.
- 8 October – BBC2 airs the final edition of The Trial of O. J. Simpson as coverage of the trial draws to a conclusion.
- 12 November – BBC2 airs Twin Peaks: Fire Walk with Me, David Lynch's 1992 prequel to the acclaimed series Twin Peaks. The film stars Sheryl Lee, Ray Wise and Kyle MacLachlan.
- 24 December – A Close Shave, the third short film starring Wallace and Gromit, airs on BBC2.

=== 1996 ===
- 15 January–11 March – Our Friends in the North, a critically acclaimed nine-part serial spanning the 1960s to the 1990s in the lives of four friends, airs on BBC2.
- 10 June–23 August – For the Summer period, the late afternoon block of children's programmes on BBC1 are transferred to BBC2.
- 19 July–4 August – The BBC provides full live coverage of the 1996 Olympic Games. The majority of the coverage airs on BBC1 although for two hours at peaktime, it airs on BBC2. Also for the first time, the BBC provides alternative live action during the overnight hours on BBC2.
- 24 November – The American animated series The Simpsons begins airing on BBC2 with the episode There's No Disgrace Like Home which aired on BBC1 the previous evening.

=== 1997 ===
Logo used from 1997 to 2001

- 14 January – Viewing figures released for 1996 indicate BBC1 and BBC2 as the only terrestrial channels to increase their audience share during the year.
- 31 March – The hugely popular children's series Teletubbies makes its debut on BBC2.
- 10 June – BBC2 airs the documentary Homeground: An Exile's Return, telling the story of Martin McGartland, a former British agent who infiltrated the Provisional Irish Republican Army.
- 13 June – The Daytime on Two strand comes to an end after fourteen years.
- 31 August – BBC2 brings a newsflash about Diana, Princess of Wales's car accident, shown after their late-night film Reds. At 6am, one hour after Diana's death was confirmed, a rolling news programme, first anchored by Martyn Lewis and from 1pm by Peter Sissons, is shown on both BBC1 and BBC2 until the latter breaks away at 3pm to provide alternative programming (a shortned Sunday Grandstand, BBC1 leftover Countryfile, documentary The Restless Year, the premiere of Full Circle with Michael Palin (another BBC1 programme), Stephen Hawking's Universe (which is the only scheduled programme of all the BBC television channels to air on its intended channel, but delayed by the aforementioned Full Circle with Michael Palin), The Natural World, Everyman, which is also a BBC1 leftover, and ending with the film Ring of Bright Water). Among the programmes to be pulled from BBC2's day's schedule are Open University programming, Children's BBC, the American game show Singled Out, Star Trek: Voyager, The Outer Limits, Reality Bites, and The Doors.
- 6 September – BBC2 provides in-vision signing of the funeral of Diana, Princess of Wales.
- 10 September – BBC2 begins airing the six-part documentary series The Nazis: A Warning from History which examines the rise and fall of the Nazi Party in Germany. The final part aired on 15 October.
- 4 October – To coincide with the introduction of the BBC's new corporate logo, the channel is now officially known as BBC Two rather than BBC2. The idents are unchanged but does feature some new editions.

=== 1998 ===
- Early in 1998, BBC Two stops shutting down its transmitters when it isn't airing the BBC Learning Zone. Instead, they air Pages from Ceefax during all overnight downtime.
- 20 February – Debut of Robot Wars on BBC Two.
- 21 March – BBC Two airs Richard Eyre's television version of his Royal National Theatre production of King Lear in the Performance series. It stars Ian Holm in the eponymous role, as well as Barbara Flynn, Amanda Redman and Victoria Hamilton as Lear's daughters.
- 7 June – To mark the tenth anniversary of the death of Russell Harty, BBC Two airs You Are, Are You Not, Russell Harty?, a documentary paying tribute to the chat show presenter.
- 21 June – The final Screen Two broadcast takes place. The strand ends after 13 years as the BBC moves its attentions away from single dramas to focus production on series and serials.
- 12 August – BBC Two announce plans for an evening of programmes dedicated to the Helen Fielding novel Bridget Jones's Diary and issues raised in the book for later in the year.
- 19 September – BBC Two airs a special Bee Gees edition of TOTP2.
- 10 October – BBC Two airs Blue Peter Night, a selection of programmes celebrating 40 years of the long-running children's series Blue Peter.
- 20 October – A new late-night programme review of the day's events in Westminster, Despatch Box, is launched. It replaces The Midnight Hour.
- 26 October – Ads Infinitum makes its debut on BBC Two.
- 17 December – Jane Root is appointed Controller of BBC Two, becoming the first female head of a BBC channel. She will replace the outgoing incumbent, Mark Thompson in January 1999.
- 29 December – BBC Two airs a special edition of TOTP2 dedicated to glam rock.

=== 1999 ===
- 11 January – The black comedy show The League of Gentlemen makes its debut on BBC Two. Along with The Fast Show and Goodness Gracious Me, it is credited with boosting international interest in British comedy series.
- 7 March – BBC Two airs the final episode of the 1993 series of Grange Hill, concluding a Sunday morning rerun of the first 16 series of the school drama which began in April 1993.
- 26 March – Debut of As the Crow Flies, a seven-part BBC Two series in which Janet Street-Porter sets out to walk the 350 miles between the Edinburgh and Greenwich observatories.
- 29 April – The Planets, an eight-part documentary series exploring the Solar System, makes its debut on BBC Two.
- 24 July – Goodness Gracious Me Night, an evening of programming dedicated to the Asian comedy sketch show Goodness Gracious Me, airs on BBC Two.
- 27 August – The BBC names Gordon Brewer and Anne Mackenzie as the presenters of Newsnight Scotland, BBC Two's forthcoming Newsnight opt-out for Scottish viewers.
- 6 September – The children's programme Tweenies makes its debut on BBC Two at 10:30am and is repeated at 3:25pm on BBC One.
- 4 October – Launch of Newsnight Scotland, the BBC Scotland opt-out of the main Newsnight programme on BBC Two.
- 7 October – Gimme Some Truth, a 56-minute documentary featuring unseen footage of John Lennon is set to air on British television. Work was recently completed on the project but a deal to broadcast it is yet to be agreed. The film is ultimately shown on BBC Two on 13 February 2000.
- 24 October – Debut of the BBC Two documentary series Playing the Race Card which looks at the history of race and immigration in the United Kingdom.
- 27 October – BBC Two airs the 150th edition of TOTP2.
- 16 November – BBC Two begins repeating episodes of Doctor Who, starting with the first episode of the 1970 adventure Spearhead from Space.
- 8 December – BBC Two airs a special edition of TOTP2 featuring performances by Canadian country singer Shania Twain.
- 31 December – BBC Two simulcasts part of 2000 Today as midnight approaches in London.

== 2000s ==
=== 2000 ===
- 17 January – BBC Two begins airing a four-part adaptation of Gormenghast, Mervyn Peake's series of fantasy novels. It stars Jonathan Rhys Meyers and is launched with a massive publicity campaign, but it is panned by critics and loses 40% of its viewership by the third episode. Figures indicate that the first episode is watched by 4.2 million, a healthy audience for a BBC Two programme, but by the third episode, aired on 31 January, fell to 2.5 million.
- 13 February – BBC Two airs Gimme Some Truth, a documentary featuring footage of John Lennon as he recorded his 1971 album Imagine.
- 22 July – The ten-part popular culture series I Love the '70s makes its debut on BBC Two, starting with I Love 1970. Each edition is dedicated to a different year of the decade, it concludes on 23 September with I Love 1979.
- 14 August – The game show The Weakest Link, presented by Anne Robinson, makes its debut on BBC Two.

=== 2001 ===
BBC Two logo used from 19 November 2001 to 18 February 2007

- 13 January – Debut of the ten-part BBC Two series I Love the '80s which examines the pop culture of that decade. It starts with I Love 1980 and concludes on 24 March with I Love 1989.
- 20 January – BBC Two airs live coverage of the inauguration of George W. Bush as the 43rd President of the United States.
- 15 August – Unveiling its Autumn schedule, the BBC announces that the ten-part World War II drama, Band of Brothers will air on BBC Two, instead of BBC One as originally planned. The channel says the decision to move the series is to allow "an uninterrupted 10-week run" and not because it was considered not to be mainstream enough.
- 18 August – Debut of the ten-part BBC Two series I Love the '90s which examines the pop culture of that decade. It starts with I Love 1990 and concludes on 3 November with I Love 1999.
- 26 September – BBC Two airs a special edition of TOTP2 featuring a live concert from Elton John.
- 5 November – BBC 2W is launched, broadcasting on digital services in Wales on weekday evenings.
- 14 November – BBC Two announces that the 1991 idents are to be axed and to be replaced by a new set of four computer-generated idents on 19 November.
- 19 November – BBC Two introduces a new set of four computer-generated idents at 7am, replacing the previous set of over 20 (four of which dating back to 1991). ITV2 rebrands on the same day.

=== 2002 ===
- 2 March – BBC Knowledge ceases transmission in the early hours of the morning (the first BBC channel to permanently close) with BBC Four launching to replace it at 7pm. The opening night is simulcast on BBC Two.
- 3 March – The acclaimed American spy drama 24, starring Kiefer Sutherland as agent Jack Bauer, makes its British debut on BBC Two.
- 6 June – BBC Two begins airing The Hunt for Britain's Paedophiles, a three-part documentary following investigations by Scotland Yard's specialist Paedophile Unit. The programme proves to be controversial, even before airing, as it is reported that after spending two years shadowing investigators, many members of the production team required counselling to deal with their exposure to the things witnessed by the unit's detectives. Executive producer Bob Long defends the programme, saying he hopes it will lead to better policing of the crime. The series concludes on 20 June.
- 20 October – BBC Two's motoring series Top Gear is relaunched with a new format.
- 24 November – Sir Winston Churchill is voted the Greatest Briton of all time by viewers of BBC Two's 100 Greatest Britons.
- 19–20 December – The final editions of Westminster Live and Despatch Box air.

=== 2003 ===
- 8 January – As a result of the review of the BBC's political output, coverage of politics is relaunched with the debut of Daily Politics.
- 11 January – Steven Spielberg's science-fiction miniseries Taken makes its British debut on BBC Two.
- 6 February – Prime Minister Tony Blair appears on Newsnight with Jeremy Paxman and a live audience where he is questioned about the Iraq crisis. Blair is also taken aback when Paxman asks him about his Christian faith and whether he and US President George W. Bush have prayed together.
- 9 February – After a long delay, BBC Choice is replaced by BBC Three. The opening night is simulcast on BBC Two.
- 5 April – BBC Two launches The Big Read, a nationwide search for Britain's favourite book. The project is designed to encourage the nation to read while people will be asked to vote for their favourite novel.
- 17 May – Following a public vote to find Britain's favourite book, the BBC's The Big Read reveals the top 100 in a special programme.
- 11 September – Debut of the panel game show QI on BBC Two, presented by Stephen Fry.
- 15 October – BBC Two airs the documentary When Michael Portillo Became a Single Mum in which former Defence Secretary Michael Portillo assumes the mantle of Merseyside single mother Jenny Miner for a week.
- 5 December – The third series of the American spy drama 24 will not air on BBC Two after negotiations between Fox and the BBC ended without a deal being reached.
- 13 December – J. R. R. Tolkien's The Lord of the Rings trilogy wins the BBC's The Big Read after receiving 23% of the vote.
- 16 December – BBC Two airs a special two-act edition of TOTP2 featuring performances from Fleetwood Mac and James Brown.
- 26 December – Debut of That Was the Week We Watched on BBC Two, narrated by actor Simon Pegg and airing six nights a week (except on New Year's Eve) looks back on past television shows for the Radio Times and TVTimes schedules from the years 1967, 1970, 1973, 1977, 1982 and 1986. The series airs until New Year's Day 2004.

=== 2004 ===
- 29 March – BBC Two Controller Jane Root will leave her role to take up a position with the Discovery Network in the United States, it is reported.
- 13 April – BBC Two airs Hawking, a drama about the life and work of theoretical physicist Professor Stephen Hawking and stars Benedict Cumberbatch in the title role.
- 19 April – Tots TV begins airing on CBeebies and BBC Two. These broadcasts continue until 2009.
- 20 April – BBC Two celebrates 40 years on air by broadcasting Happy Birthday BBC Two.
- 7 May – The Simpsons is broadcast on BBC Two for the final time as the show moves to Channel 4 on 5 November.
- 14 May – BBC Four Controller Roly Keating is appointed to succeed Jane Root as Controller of BBC Two.
- 4 October – The UK debut of the American version of The Apprentice with Donald Trump on BBC Two. The UK version with Alan Sugar would debut on 16 February 2005.
- 29 November – The BBC announces that Top of the Pops will move from its Friday evening BBC One slot to BBC Two where it will air on Sunday evenings.
- 2 December – BBC Two unveils its Winter season of programming, which will include a major documentary, Auschwitz, to coincide with Holocaust Memorial Day.

=== 2005 ===
- 8 January – Jerry Springer: The Opera airs on BBC Two, despite protests from Christian Voice and other groups.
- 11 January – Debut of the six-part BBC Two documentary series Auschwitz: The Nazis and 'The Final Solution', which recounts the history of Auschwitz concentration camp. The final part is aired on 15 February.
- 27 January – Holocaust Memorial Day and the 60th anniversary of the liberation of Auschwitz concentration camp are observed in the UK. BBC Two and BBC News 24 air Auschwitz Remembered, a special news programme providing coverage of memorial events.
- 16 February – The first series of the UK version of The Apprentice makes its debut on BBC Two.
- 19 March – Ahead of the return of Doctor Who to BBC television later in the month, BBC Two airs a "Doctor Who Night", with three programmes celebrating the series.
- 2 July – BBC Two airs the first half of the Live 8 pop concert from Hyde Park with the second half airing on BBC One.
- 17 July – After 41 years broadcasting on BBC One, music show Top of the Pops is switched to BBC Two due to declining audiences. This is not enough to save it and it is axed the following year.
- 19 September – The famous children's classic character Muffin the Mule (who has disappeared from TV screens for a very long time) is back with a brand new 2D animated series on BBC Two.
- 26–27 September – No Direction Home, Martin Scorsese's documentary on Bob Dylan, makes its debut on BBC Two in the UK, under the Arena banner.
- 5 October – The 6am CBeebies programming block on BBC Two ends and is replaced by an hour of Pages from Ceefax.
- 28 October – Sheffield based rock band Arctic Monkeys make their first appearance on BBC Two's Later...with Jools Holland.
- 21 December – The BBC is to trial a three-month experiment in which its Saturday morning schedules for BBC One and BBC Two will be swapped. The changes, taking effect from January 2006 are being implemented because of frequent scheduling changes caused by big events and breaking news stories and will mean children's programming will be absent from BBC One's Saturday morning lineup for the first time since 1976.

=== 2006 ===
- 20 June – The BBC announces that Top of the Pops will be axed, the final show airing on 30 July.
- 30 July – Top of the Pops airs its final regular edition after being axed earlier in the year. However, the show returns for a Christmas special.
- 16 October – The children's programme Numberjacks makes its debut on BBC2.
- 31 October – Pop star Madonna appears on Newsnight, where she gives her first British television interview about her controversial adoption of an African baby.
- 17 November – Episode eight of Series D of QI is a Children in Need special with Alan Davies, Rich Hall, Jonathan Ross and Phill Jupitus who discuss the topic of Descendants with presenter Stephen Fry.
- 16 December – At 5:30am, BBC Two airs the final Open University course-related television broadcast with their course content now available through media such as podcasts and DVDs it is no longer necessary for the programmes to be aired on television and radio. However, the Open University continues to make programming for a broader audience with series including Coast, Child of Our Time and Battle of the Geeks.
- 25 December – The weekday 6am CBeebies programming block on BBC Two is reintroduced.

=== 2007 ===
Boxed variant of 2007 to 2021 logo, used from 2007 to 2018 as a primary logo and from 2018 to 2021 as a secondary one

- 28 January – BBC Two airs the final edition of Sunday Grandstand.
- 18 February – BBC Two launches 14 new idents designed by Abbott Mead Vickers BBDO and produced by Red Bee Media, with the "2" becoming a "Windows of the World" a portal through which the world is seen differently.
- 8 June – Adele Adkins, a 19-year-old singer from London makes her television debut on BBC Two's Later... with Jools Holland, performing her song "Daydreamer". She became one of the first artists to appear on the show without having released a record because producer Alison Howe booked her after hearing a demo tape. Adele's debut album, 19, is released in January 2008.
- 11 July – The Alastair Campbell Diaries makes its debut on BBC Two, a series in which Campbell reads extracts from his memoirs over footage of key moments in the recently ended Blair government. The three part series is aired over three nights, concluding on 13 July.
- 17 October – The town of Whitehaven in Cumbria becomes the first place in the UK to lose their analogue television signals and start the digital switchover, starting with BBC Two. The other four channels are switched off on 14 November.

=== 2008 ===
- 22 July – BBC Two Controller Roly Keating is appointed as the BBC's first director of archive content. He will take up the role in the Autumn.
- 1 October – BBC Four Controller Janice Hadlow is appointed Controller of BBC Two, replacing outgoing incumbent Roly Keating from November.
- 5 November – BBC Two airs a Newsnight special on the election of Barack Obama in which presenter Jeremy Paxman famously addresses the rapper Dizzee Rascal as "Mr Rascal".
- 19 November – QI airs its last episode to be originally shown on BBC Two, as part of Children in Need. The series moves to BBC One during Christmas.

=== 2009 ===
- 2 January – BBC 2W closes as part of plans to achieve 3% savings at BBC Cymru Wales. Consequently, the digital version of BBC Two becomes a simulcast of BBC Two on analogue with fewer Wales opt-outs.
- 7 February – BBC Two airs the first part of Iran and the West, a landmark three-part documentary marking the 30th anniversary of the Iranian Revolution.
- 7 April – BBC Two suffers its second worse peak time viewing audience since 2001, with a share of 5.3%.

== 2010s ==
=== 2010 ===
- 23 June – Following the previous day's emergency budget statement, David Cameron and Nick Clegg are questioned by a live audience on its potential impact. The programme Britain's Economy: Cameron and Clegg Face the Audience is presented by Nick Robinson and aired on the BBC News Channel and BBC Two.

=== 2011 ===
- 13 June – BBC Two airs the controversial documentary Choosing to Die, a film presented by Terry Pratchett that examines the topic of assisted suicide.
- 6 October – BBC Director General Mark Thompson announces that BBC HD will close to be replaced by a high definition simulcast of BBC Two. BBC Two HD will work much the same way as BBC One HD. This move allows the corporation to save £2.1 million, used to count towards their budget deficit following the freezing of the license fee and the extra financial responsibility of additional services.

=== 2012 ===
- 18 January – A call by BBC Two's Stargazing Live for amateur astronomers to locate possible exoplanets, planets orbiting stars outside the Solar System, leads to the discovery of a new Neptune-sized exoplanet by two viewers, one in Peterborough. The planet is named Threapleton Holmes B in their honour.
- 12 March – BBC Two airs a programme in its This World strand concerning the Chinese television programme Interviews Before Execution in which death row inmates are interviewed by a reporter shortly before they are executed. Chinese authorities cancel the show following international interest generated by the documentary.
- 19 May – "Absent Friends", a fourth series episode of comedy Dad's Army, is repeated on BBC Two for the first time since its original broadcast in 1970. Previously, the episode was left out of repeat runs because of the controversial appearance of the Original IRA.
- 9 August – The BBC commissions a one-off drama to celebrate the 50th anniversary of Doctor Who. The film, An Adventure in Space and Time will tell the story of the team behind Doctor Who's creation and will air on BBC Two in 2013.
- 23 October – After 32 years, Pages from Ceefax is shown for the last time during downtime on BBC Two. To mark the occasion the last broadcast is introduced by the symbol the channel was using 32 years earlier, older music is played and a final special image is shown thanking viewers for watching. The Plain English Campaign gives the service a lifetime achievement award for its "clarity" and use of "everyday words".
- 28 October – Instead of launching a digital version of Pages from Ceefax, BBC Two starts showing This is BBC Two during its overnight downtime. This consists of a loop of trailers of forthcoming BBC Two programmes.

=== 2013 ===
2012–2018 (secondary), 2015–2021 (Northern Ireland), 2018–2021 (primary)

- 4 January – CBBC and CBeebies both air on BBC Two for the last time.
- 26 March – BBC Two launches in high definition for the first time, two and a half years after BBC One did.
- 8 May – BBC Two Controller Janice Hadlow takes temporary control of BBC Four following the departure of Richard Klein to become head of ITV factual programming.
- 12 September – Debut of the period crime drama Peaky Blinders on BBC Two.

=== 2014 ===
- 5 February – Debut of the dark comedy anthology series Inside No. 9 on BBC Two.
- 6 February – The BBC announces Newsnight Scotland will end during 2014 and be replaced by Scotland 2014 as part of a shake up of BBC Scotland's referendum coverage. The final edition is broadcast on 22 May.
- 7–23 February – The BBC gives over BBC Two to non-stop coverage of the 2014 Winter Olympics with live action shown continuously from around 5am until mid-evening and this is followed by a one-hour highlights programme.
- 15 February – Janice Hadlow will step down as joint Controller of BBC Two and BBC Four to take up a new role in charge of "special projects and seasons" at the BBC.
- 11 April – Kim Shillinglaw is named Controller of BBC Two and BBC Four, replacing Janice Hadlow.
- 20 April – 50th anniversary of the launch of BBC Two.
- 30 April – Jeremy Paxman announces he will leave Newsnight in June after 25 years with the programme.
- 2 May – BBC Two's Newsnight appoints The Guardian newspaper's investigations editor, Nick Hopkins as its investigations correspondent.
- 18 June – Jeremy Paxman leaves Newsnight after 25 years of news broadcasting but he continues to host University Challenge.
- 8 July – BBC Two brings back the 1991–2001 idents (based around a sans-serif '2') for the channel's 50th anniversary. Since then, the idents have become permanent and will air into 2015 and beyond until they were replaced with new idents in September 2018.
- 4 August – The BBC broadcast a series of memorial events in Great Britain and Belgium marking 100 years since Britain's entry into the First World War. BBC Two broadcasts a memorial service at Westminster Abbey, culminating at 11pm, the hour at which Britain's entry was confirmed.
- 14 September – The closing ceremony of the inaugural Invictus Games takes place in London with a music concert at Olympic Park featuring artists and groups such as Bryan Adams, Ellie Goulding, James Blunt and the Kaiser Chiefs.
- 22 September – The BBC apologises after seven viewers complained about an edition of TOTP2 that aired on 13 September on BBC Two which included a brief clip of Jimmy Savile from a 1971 edition of Top of the Pops. The footage has since been edited out of the programme.
- 1 October – BBC Two airs the This World documentary Rwanda's Untold Story, which questions official accounts of the 1994 Rwandan genocide.
- 13 November – The BBC2 "Window on the World" idents is seen for the final time after 7 years in use. Although elements of it (programme slides) are retained.
- 27 December – Part One of the Top Gear Patagonia Special is aired on BBC Two and seen by an average audience of 4.7 million viewers. The second part, which features the controversial Argentina leg of the programme's visit to South America, airs the following day and is watched by an average of 4.8 million viewers.

=== 2015 ===
- 21 January – The television adaptation of Hilary Mantel's novels Wolf Hall and Bring Up the Bodies makes its debut on BBC Two to much critical acclaim, but viewers quickly take to social media to complain about the poor lighting in the series.
- 3 February – Reinventing the Royals, a BBC Two documentary pulled from the 4 January schedule because of concerns over the broadcasting rights of archive footage, is rescheduled for 19 February.
- 16 February – The BBC unveils a series of new arts programmes that will air in primetime slots. They include a new BBC Two series titled Artsnight and a one off debate, Artists Question Time, presented by Kirsty Wark, which will air on BBC Four.
- 4 March – BBC Two airs the Storyville documentary India's Daughter, which includes an interview with the man convicted over the 2012 Delhi gang rape.
- 17 March – The BBC confirms it has bought the rights to broadcast BT Sport's The Clare Balding Show, which will air on BBC Two. The programme makes its BBC Two debut on 3 April.
- 7 April – BBC News launches a new two-hour weekday current affairs programme called The Victoria Derbyshire Show. The programme is broadcast on both BBC Two and the BBC News Channel.
- 9 May – Contemporary dancer Connor Scott wins the inaugural BBC Young Dancer competition, broadcast live on BBC Two.
- 17 May – BBC Two begins airing The Detectives, a three-part documentary series following investigators at Greater Manchester Police's sex crimes unit. The series, aired over three consecutive nights, focuses on the investigation into historical sex crimes committed by disc jockey Ray Teret and his subsequent trial and conviction for those offences.
- 17 June – BBC Two airs the first in a series of televised debates ahead of the 2015 Labour Party leadership election, which sees the potential candidates hoping to succeed Ed Miliband go head-to-head in front of a studio audience.
- 28 June – BBC Two airs the final edition of Top Gear to be presented by Jeremy Clarkson, Richard Hammond and James May, a 75-minute compilation of footage shot before the trio quit the show. After its broadcast Clarkson says that he is "so sad and sorry it's ended like this".
- 5 July – The 2015 FIFA Women's World Cup Final between the United States and Japan is aired on BBC Two. The coverage is watched by an audience of 500,000.
- 4 October – The BBC admits that a volcanic eruption shown on the first episode of BBC Two's Patagonia: Earth's Secret Paradise was actually footage from two different volcanoes taken four years apart.
- 2 November – BBC Two starts airing Simply Nigella, the first cookery programme to be presented by Nigella Lawson since her personal life was the subject of a high-profile court case. The programme, aired at 8:30pm, attracts 2.3 million viewers (a 10.8% audience share), but proves to be to the detriment of the quiz show Only Connect, which was moved forward an hour from its usual slot to make way for Lawson's new show. Having attracted an audience of 2.3 million for its 26 October edition, Only Connect's new timeslot sees it garner a viewership of 1.7 million, a drop of 600,000. The show will return to its usual time once Simply Nigella has finished. The first episode of Simply Nigella also becomes the subject of a social media storm after viewers are shown how to make avocado on toast, with many feeling the recipe is too easy.

=== 2016 ===
- 19 January – BBC One controller Charlotte Moore is appointed to the newly created role of controller of BBC TV channels and iPlayer, while Kim Shillinglaw, current controller of BBC Two and BBC Four is to leave the BBC and her position abolished.
- 15 February – BBC Two begins airing The People v. O. J. Simpson, the first series in the American true crimes anthology, American Crime Story.
- 29 May – Top Gear relaunches with Chris Evans as presenter. The episode is seen by an average 4.4 million viewers.
- 25 June
  - Following the EU referendum in which the UK voted to leave the European Union, Newsnight airs a special edition looking at life after Brexit.
  - Adele headlines the Pyramid Stage at Glastonbury 2016. The set, aired on BBC Two, is watched by a peak audience of 3.7 million, making it the most watched performance to be televised during this year's festival and giving a single Glastonbury set the largest number of viewers since 2008.
- 1 July – Patrick Holland, current head of documentaries commissioning at the BBC, is appointed to the newly created role of BBC Two channel editor.
- 11 August – The BBC has signed Gabby Logan to present The Premier League Show, a midweek BBC Two magazine programme focusing on the Premier League, beginning on 25 August. Gary Lineker will also present a slot on the show.
- 6 September – BBC Two announces that it will dedicate its Saturday night scheduling to the arts from 1 October and throughout the Autumn season with programmes about literature, cinema and music.

=== 2017 ===
- 7 January – BBC Two airs the documentary David Bowie: The Last Five Years on the eve of what would have been the singer's 70th birthday.
- 3 June – BBC Two airs Sgt Pepper's Musical Revolution with Howard Goodall, a documentary presented by Howard Goodall celebrating the 50th anniversary of the release of The Beatles album Sgt. Pepper's Lonely Hearts Club Band.
- 13 June – BBC Two airs the documentary Jo Cox: Death of An MP to coincide with the first anniversary of her murder.
- 15 June – Antibiotics are voted Britain's greatest invention following a live television special, Britain's Greatest Invention on BBC Two.
- 17 June – Following the Grenfell Tower fire in London, BBC Two pulls the documentary Venice Biennale: Sink or Swim as it features artist Khadija Saye who is believed to be among those to have perished in the blaze. In addition, the opening edition of BBC One's singing contest Pitch Battle is also replaced by a different edition after the blaze, a decision taken due to song lyrics.
- 9 August – The BBC announces that the Radio 4 cultural review programme Front Row will be extended to television and begin airing on BBC Two in September.
- 18 August – BBC Two have acquired the broadcast rights to The Assassination of Gianni Versace, the second series of the FX true crimes anthology drama series American Crime Story, the series will air in 2018.
- 4 September – BBC Two airs Diana and I, a film that explores how the death of Diana, Princess of Wales affected ordinary people.
- 23 September – BBC Two airs the Later...with Jools Holland 25th anniversary special, a concert held at the Royal Albert Hall on 21 September. Acts include Foo Fighters, Paul Weller, Van Morrison, Dizzee Rascal, Gregory Porter, Kali Uchis, Camille, Songhoy Blues and Jorja Smith. The TV version of Front Row makes its debut on the same evening.
- 26 September – BBC Two airs the Horizon documentary "Being Transgender", a film that looks at what it means to be transgender and what happens when someone undergoes transitioning.
- 30 September – Launch of Saturday Mash-Up! on BBC Two and CBBC, a new Saturday morning children's TV show that will attempt to recapture the spirit of classic BBC programmes such as Going Live! and Live & Kicking.
- 14 October – In addition to Saturday Mash-Up! (until 16 December 2017), some of the CBBC programmes were aired on BBC Two's Saturday morning strand.

=== 2018 ===
- 17 March – BBC Two announces it will axe Robot Wars for the second time due to a lack of making new action toys as Hexbug reintroduced production rather late, the series having been revived in 2016.
- 28 May – BBC Two airs a new adaptation of King Lear set in a mythologised but futuristic present and starring Anthony Hopkins in the eponymous role, as well as Emma Thompson, Emily Watson and Florence Pugh as Lear's daughters.
- 24 July – The final edition of Daily Politics is broadcast, ending a fifteen-year run as BBC News' flagship weekday politics show.
- 14 August – BBC Two airs one-off edition of the 1990s comedy sketch show Goodness Gracious Me featuring new material and old and new characters.
- 28 August – BBC Two confirms that Autumnwatch will air a week of programmes from New England in October to celebrate the US region's colourful autumn.
- 3 September – The first edition of Politics Live is broadcast.
- 25 September – BBC Two airs The Flu That Killed 50 Million, a docudrama about the 1918 Spanish flu pandemic narrated by Christopher Eccleston.
- 27 September – BBC Two receives a new set of idents. The Curve idents replace the '2' logo in various ident sets since 1991.
- 28 October – BBC Two airs a live episode of the anthology series Inside No. 9 to coincide with Halloween.
- 20 November – The BBC Two programmes Winterwatch, Springwatch and Autumnwatch will be broadcast from the Cairngorms in 2019.
- 29 November – HD simulcast channels of BBC Two Wales and BBC Two Northern Ireland begin broadcasting.

=== 2019 ===
- 17 February – BBC Two Scotland closes in preparation for the launch of the BBC Scotland channel. Viewers in Scotland can still watch the national version of BBC Two, with regional content aired by BBC Two Scotland being transferred to the new channel.
- 24 February – The new BBC Scotland channel launches and replaces BBC Two Scotland.
- 26 April – BBC Two airs the debut episode of The Looming Tower, a ten-part dramatisation of non-fiction book of the same name that explores the rising threat of Osama bin Laden and al-Qaeda during the years before the 9/11 attacks in 2001.

== 2020s ==
=== 2020 ===
- 29 January – BBC News announces it will shed 450 posts, including roles from Newsnight and BBC Radio 5 Live, as part of £80m worth of savings being made by the BBC.
- 17 March – The final edition of The Victoria Derbyshire Show is broadcast in order to focus on coverage of the Coronavirus pandemic. The programme had been due to come off air later in 2020 due to funding cuts.

=== 2021 ===
BBC Two logo used since 2021.

- 9 April – At 12:04, BBC Two announces the death of Prince Philip, Duke of Edinburgh, during the daily morning simulcast with the BBC News channel. Programmes are then cancelled in favour of ongoing news coverage of unfolding events and special programmes paying tribute to the Prince. Among the show pulled from that day's schedule included Head Hunters, the Australian series 800 Words, coverage of the 2021 Masters Tournament, Eggheads, Flog It!, Richard Osman’s House of Games, MOTDx, Great British Menu, Gardeners' World, I'll Get This Extra Helping and Battlestar Galactica. The BBC receives a significant number of viewer complaints about its continuous coverage, which on BBC Two continues until 6am the following morning.
- 20 October – The BBC introduces its new logo, being a modification of a previous one used since 1997. BBC Two also received the new logo, being a refreshed version of the previous logo, matching BBC's new graphical identity. The 'curve' idents remain, however.

=== 2022 ===
- 7 March – For a short period, BBC Two broadcasts early evening screenings of BBC One's afternoon soap Doctors, airing the programme four nights a week at 7pm.
- 11–21 August – The BBC shows full live coverage of the 2022 European Championships with around 14 hours of live coverage each day. BBC Two shows the majority of the coverage, apart from during the afternoon when the event transfers to BBC One.
- 3 September – CBeebies programming returns on Saturday mornings on BBC Two at 6:35am, with CBBC programming moving to 7:20am. The Saturday morning strand is officially branded as the Saturday Kids Zone (often known as The Best of CBBC, The Best of CBeebies, Saturday Morning Kids Zone or simply the Kids Zone).
- 8 September – BBC Two airs some programmes initially scheduled to be shown on BBC One (namely Doctors, Money for Nothing, Escape to the Country, Garden Rescue, The Bidding Room and Pointless), due to the latter channel covering news of the health of Queen Elizabeth II. BBC Two then interrupts coverage from the 2022 Diamond League finals to announce her death. Programmes are then cancelled to provide news coverage or documentaries highlighting the life of the late Queen. Among the programmes pulled from that day's schedule are Saving Lives at Sea, All That Glitters: Britain's Next Jewellery Star, Stuck and Fake or Fortune? (airing on the Sign Zone)
- 9–16 September – Most of BBC One's pre-recorded daytime programmes are shown on BBC Two due to most of BBC One's output being given over to provide live coverage of the death and state funeral of Elizabeth II.
- 19 September – BBC Two broadcasts live coverage of the state funeral of Queen Elizabeth II with in-vision signing.

=== 2023 ===
- 17 April – Nicky Campbell's BBC Radio 5 Live weekday morning show starts to be simulcast on BBC Two. It is also seen on the BBC News Channel, which two weeks earlier had merged with BBC World to form a single global channel with UK opt-outs.
- 6 May – BBC Two airs full coverage of the coronation of Charles III and Camilla, with its coverage having in-vision signing.
- October – The simulcasting of Nicky Campbell's BBC Radio 5 Live weekday morning show ends to allow for extended live coverage of the Gaza war and when programming returns to normal, the simulcast does not reappear after October 2023. Consequently, BBC News is now shown each weekday from 9am until lunchtime.

=== 2024 ===
- 27 May – Newsnight relaunches as a half-hour "interview, debate and discussion" programme, ditching its special reporting team. The change is part of cost-cutting measures across the BBC.

=== 2025 ===
- 3 March – BBC Two airs the 500th edition of the quiz show Only Connect.

=== 2026 ===
  - 18 September – The Friday edition of Newsnight moves to the earlier time of 7pm.

== See also ==
- Timeline of BBC One
- Timeline of the BBC Television Service
- Timeline of non-flagship BBC television channels
- Timeline of RTÉ Television
