= 2014 in Scottish television =

This is a list of events in Scottish television from 2014.

== Events ==
=== January ===
- 5 January – Speaking on an edition of BBC One's The Andrew Marr Show, Prime Minister David Cameron declines an invitation from Scottish First Minister Alex Salmond to take part in a televised debate on Scottish independence ahead of September's referendum on the issue.
- 5 January – Figures released by TV Licensing Scotland indicate that just over 700 homes in Scotland continue to purchase black-and-white television licences, 230 of them in Glasgow.
- 10 January – BBC Alba debuts Bean a' Mhinisteir (The Minister's Wife), a six-part reality television programme about the wives of Church of Scotland ministers.
- 21 January – Writing in the Daily Record, MSP Joan McAlpine urges television bosses to act to ensure more balanced broadcasting, after an academic study found that news reports tend to favour the pro-union argument in the Scottish independence debate.
- 29 January – A safety advert for Cycling Scotland is banned by the Advertising Standards Authority for showing a rider without a helmet.
- 30 January – The Scottish Football Association agrees a new four-year deal with Sky Sports to show its matches in the UK and Ireland.

=== February ===
- 3 February – The Law Society of Scotland says it is in favour of allowing cameras into Scottish Courts, and suggests adopting the format used by New Zealand, where filming is left to the Judge's discretion.
- 5 February – The BBC confirms that Sarah Smith will join BBC Scotland to present Scotland 2014, a 30-minute weeknight studio programme about the independence referendum. The programme replaces Newsnight Scotland from May, which will not return once Scotland 2014 ends in October.
- 6 February – Sarah Smith criticises Twitter users who have accused her of anti-independence bias following the previous day's announcement of her new presenting role.
- 17 February – Debut of The Street, a documentary about Glasgow's Sauchiehall Street. The programme has caused controversy before going on air because it contains scenes involving racist behaviour, and scantily-clad women.
- 19 February – STV journalist Peter Smith is named Young Talent of the Year by the Royal Television Society for an investigation into boardroom practices at Glasgow Rangers.
- 22 February – BBC Alba is forced to delay the broadcast of Ross County's match with St Mirren because of the amount of swearing that could be heard from supporters. Transmission of the match—scheduled for 17:30—is delayed until the post-watershed time of 22.55.
- 25 February – Scotland Tonight airs a referendum debate featuring Deputy First Minister Nicola Sturgeon and Scottish Labour leader Johann Lamont. Lesley Riddoch, writing in The Sunday Post later describes the debate as a "shambles" because of its argumentative nature, and because presenter Rona Dougall was not an effective chair.
- 26 February – Speaking at the Oxford Media Conference, Maria Miller, the UK's Secretary of State for Culture, Media and Sport says Scotland will lose the BBC if it votes for independence in September.
- February – STV's The Nightshift once again becomes a seven-days-a-week programme, but only for four months when in June it reverts to being shown on four nights each week.

=== March ===
- 7 March – Ministers in the Westminster Government are considering decriminalising non-payment of the TV licence, making it a civil offence instead, the Daily Telegraph reports.
- 7 March – Research by TV Licensing indicates that children in Scotland still prefer to watch their favourite programmes on television despite technology making shows available through other media.

=== April ===
- 2 April – The BBC confirms that its school drama, Waterloo Road will end in 2015, following the conclusion of series 10.
- 19 April – STV leaves the Confederation of British Industry after it backed the campaign against Scottish independence, saying that partiality rules meant it had no choice.
- 23 April – STV reports a 5% increase in revenue over the first quarter of 2014.
- 28 April – STV HD launches on Sky+ HD and Freesat.

=== May ===
- 7 May – STV hires BBC producer Sarah Brown to be its head of drama.
- 22 May – The final edition of Newsnight Scotland is broadcast on BBC Two Scotland.

=== June ===
- 2 June – Launch of STV Glasgow.
- 12 June – Addressing the Better Together Campaign, the cross-party group arguing for Scotland to stay as part of the United Kingdom in the forthcoming referendum, former Prime Minister Gordon Brown says that plans for a state-funded Scottish Broadcasting Service in an independent Scotland would require a significantly higher TV licence fee to enable it to produce the same quantity of programming currently put out by the BBC.
- 22 June – First Minister Alex Salmond agrees to take part in a televised debate on independence with head of the Better Together campaign, Alistair Darling, which will be aired by STV.
- 23 June – The BBC announces its largest ever political debate ahead of the referendum. 12,000 first time voters will gather at Glasgow's SSE Hydro for a BBC One debate on independence on 11 September.
- 29 June – Hundreds of demonstrators gather outside BBC Scotland's Pacific Quay studios in Glasgow to protest at what they perceive to be the corporation's pro-union bias.

=== August ===
- 5 August – Alex Salmond and Alistair Darling take part in a televised debate on Scottish independence held by STV at Glasgow's Royal Conservatoire of Scotland. The debate is streamed live online through STV Player, but viewers outside Scotland report encountering problems trying to watch the feed.
- 19 August – Writing in The Guardian, former BBC Director General John Birt writes of the "devastating" impact he feels a Yes vote in the forthcoming Scottish independence referendum would have on the BBC, and that Scottish viewers would have to pay to receive BBC services. His views are echoed in a speech the following day by Margaret Curran, the Shadow Secretary of State for Scotland.
- 21 August – The Iain Banks novel Stonemouth is to be adapted into a two part television drama for BBC Scotland in a joint project between the broadcaster and production company Slate North.
- 25 August – BBC One Scotland airs a second televised debate on Scottish independence, featuring Alex Salmond and Alistair Darling.

=== September ===
- 11 September – First Minister Alex Salmond is involved in a heated exchange with BBC journalist Nick Robinson during a referendum press conference in Edinburgh after Salmond accuses the Treasury of leaking market sensitive information outside of trading hours. Robinson had reported plans by The Royal Bank of Scotland to relocate to England in the event of a Yes vote the previous evening, causing some overnight negative market reaction in Asia, and prompting the First Minister to call for an investigation into the source of the leak, which he felt the BBC should co-operate with. An official announcement from the bank was due to be made at 7.00 am on 11 September.
- 11 September – BBC One airs Scotland Decides: The Big, Big Debate in which 16 and 17-year-old first time voters are given the opportunity to quiz a Question Time-style panel of politicians about issues surrounding the Independence referendum.
- 14 September – Demonstrators gather outside BBC Scotland's Glasgow headquarters to protest against what they perceive to be the BBC's anti-independence bias.
- 16 September – Two days before the independence referendum, BBC One airs Scotland Decides: The Dimbleby Interviews in which David Dimbleby conducts an in-depth interview with Gordon Brown for the No campaign and Alex Salmond for the Yes campaign.
- 18–19 September – The BBC, ITV and Sky News provide coverage of the results of the Scottish independence referendum as the results are counted overnight. Shortly after 5.00 am, it is announced that Scotland has voted to reject secession from the United Kingdom.

=== October ===
- 12 October – Jackie Bird celebrates 25 years of working on Reporting Scotland.

=== November ===
- 18 November – Ofcom rules that STV was in breach of broadcasting rules after airing a repeat edition of Scotland Tonight discussing the independence referendum on the day the vote was being held.

== Debuts ==
=== BBC ===
- 10 January – Bean a' Mhinisteir (The Minister's Wife) on BBC Alba
- 30 January – The Stuarts on BBC Two
- 17 February – The Street on BBC One
- 27 May – Scotland 2014 on BBC Two
- 27 October – Scot Squad on BBC Two

=== STV ===
- 17 March – The Widower
- 31 March – The Lie
- 7 May – Billy Connolly's Big Send Off

== Television series ==
- Reporting Scotland (1968–1983; 1984–present)
- Sportscene (1975–present)
- Public Account (1976–present)
- The Beechgrove Garden (1978–present)
- Only an Excuse? (1993–2020)
- River City (2002–2026)
- The Adventure Show (2005–present)
- Trusadh (2008–present)
- STV Rugby (2009–2010; 2011–present)
- Gary: Tank Commander (2009–present)
- Sport Nation (2009–present)
- STV News at Six (2009–present)
- The Nightshift (2010–present)
- Scotland Tonight (2011–present)
- Shetland (2013–present)

== Ending this year ==
- 22 May – Newsnight Scotland (1999)

== Deaths ==
- 14 July – John Milne, 72, Journalist and broadcaster
- 31 July – Kenny Ireland, 68, Actor and theatre director
- 25 November – Arthur Montford, 85, Sports broadcaster

== See also ==
- 2014 in Scotland
