= 2014 in Scotland =

- Centuries: 19th; 20th; 21st
- Decades: 1990s; 2000s; 2010s; 2020s
- See also: List of years in Scotland; Timeline of Scottish history 2014 in: The UK • England • Wales • Elsewhere; Scottish football: 2013–14 • 2014–15; 2014 in Scottish television

Events from the year 2014 in Scotland.

== Incumbents ==
- First Minister and Keeper of the Great Seal – Alex Salmond (until 18 November 2014); Nicola Sturgeon (since 20 November 2014)
- Secretary of State for Scotland – Alistair Carmichael

=== Law officers ===
- Lord Advocate – Frank Mulholland
- Solicitor General for Scotland – Lesley Thomson
- Advocate General for Scotland – Lord Wallace of Tankerness

=== Judiciary ===
- Lord President of the Court of Session and Lord Justice General – Lord Gill
- Lord Justice Clerk – Lord Carloway
- Chairman of the Scottish Land Court – Lord McGhie until 1 October; then Lord Minginish

== Events ==
=== January ===
- 3 January – The Scottish Environment Protection Agency issue more than 20 flood warnings, though none of them is "severe".
- 13 January – The UK Treasury says that should Scots vote to leave the United Kingdom, it will honour all UK government debt issued up to the date of Scottish independence.
- 23 January – Cowdenbeath by-election for the Scottish Parliament constituency of Cowdenbeath is won by Alex Rowley of the Labour Party.
- 29 January – During a visit to Scotland, Mark Carney, Governor of the Bank of England says that in the event of Scottish independence, the country would need to give up some powers in return for a currency union with the United Kingdom.

=== February ===
- 13 February – UK Chancellor of the Exchequer George Osborne, backed by Labour and the Liberal Democrats, says a vote for Scottish independence would mean walking away from the pound.

=== March ===
- 18 March – Scottish Labour's Devolution Commission publishes its long-awaited report setting out proposals for enhanced devolution that will be implemented if Scotland votes no in the referendum and if Labour are elected in 2015.
- 29 March – A government minister at the heart of the pro-union campaign admits that a currency union would eventually be agreed between an independent Scotland and the remainder of the UK to ensure fiscal and economic stability on both sides of the border.

=== April ===
- 1 April – Death of Keane Wallis-Bennett: a 12-year-old girl is killed when a wall in her Edinburgh school collapses.

=== May ===
- 22 May – European Parliament Election. In the results, announced on 26 May, the SNP wins the popular vote and retains 2 MEPs, Labour retains 2 MEPs, the Conservatives retain their single MEP and UKIP wins the final seat from the Liberal Democrats.
- 23 May – A fire at the Glasgow School of Art causes severe damage to the main building, designed by Charles Rennie Mackintosh.
- 31 May
  - Start of passenger services on Edinburgh Trams.
  - Three people are killed and one injured after a vehicle collides with spectators at the Jim Clark Rally in the Borders.

=== July ===
- 15 July – Launch of .scot geographic top-level domain name.
- 23 July – The 2014 Commonwealth Games open in Glasgow.

=== August ===
- 3 August – The 2014 Commonwealth Games closing ceremony is held in Glasgow.
- 5 August – The first of two televised debates between Alex Salmond and Alistair Darling is held at Glasgow's Royal Conservatoire of Scotland ahead of September's referendum on Scottish independence.
- 25 August – The second televised debate between Alex Salmond and Alistair Darling is broadcast from Glasgow.

=== September ===
- 6 September – A YouGov opinion poll on Scottish independence commissioned for The Sunday Times gives the Yes campaign a majority for the first time. The 51–49 result applies when undecided voters are excluded.
- 7 September – Speaking on the BBC's The Andrew Marr Show, Chancellor George Osborne pledges a "plan of action" for further devolution to Scotland if Scots vote "No" in the forthcoming referendum.
- 8 September – Speaking in Edinburgh, former UK Prime Minister Gordon Brown sets out a timetable for transferring more powers to Scotland in the event of a "No" vote.
- 9 September – The Scottish leaders of the three main UK political parties give their backing to greater devolved powers for the Scottish Parliament as Prime Minister David Cameron and Opposition leader Ed Miliband plan a trip to Scotland to campaign together for a "No" vote.
- 15 September – 'The Vow', a joint statement by the leaders of the three main unionist parties, David Cameron, Ed Miliband and Nick Clegg, promising more powers for Scotland in the event of a "No" vote, is published in the Daily Record.
- 18 September – 2014 Scottish independence referendum held. The referendum question is: "Should Scotland be an independent country?"
- 19 September – 2014 Scottish independence referendum results:
  - Scotland votes "No" to Scottish independence by a margin of 55.3% to 44.7%.
  - Voter turnout at the referendum was 84.5%, a record high for any election held in the United Kingdom since the introduction of universal suffrage in 1918.
  - Prime Minister David Cameron announces plans for further devolution of powers to Scotland as well as to the other countries of the United Kingdom with the Smith Commission established under Lord Smith of Kelvin to convene talks.
  - Alex Salmond announces his resignation as First Minister of Scotland and leader of the Scottish National Party following the defeat of the "Yes" campaign at the referendum.
- 24 September – Nicola Sturgeon launches her campaign to become leader of the Scottish National Party and Scottish First Minister in the forthcoming leadership election.

=== October ===
- 1 October – Membership of the Scottish National Party has trebled from 25,000 to 75,000 in the 13 days since the referendum on Scottish independence.
- 15 October – Nicola Sturgeon will succeed Alex Salmond as leader of the Scottish National Party and First Minister of Scotland after she was the only candidate to put their name forward in the party's leadership election.
- 20 October – Introduction of a minimum charge of 5p for single-use plastic shopping bags.
- 24 October – Johann Lamont resigns as leader of the Scottish Labour Party with immediate effect, triggering a leadership election.
- 30 October – Resignation of Anas Sarwar as deputy leader of the Scottish Labour Party.

=== November ===
- November – Golden Eagle Oilfield production begins.
- 2 November – Former UK Chancellor of the Exchequer and leader of the Better Together campaign Alistair Darling announces he will step down as an MP at the next general election.
- 14 November
  - Nicola Sturgeon succeeds Alex Salmond as leader of the Scottish National Party at their annual conference in Perth, while Stewart Hosie is elected to the deputy leadership role vacated by Sturgeon.
  - Angus Sinclair, the serial killer and rapist convicted after a retrial of the "World's End Murders" of 17-year-old Edinburgh residents Christine Eadie and Helen Scott in 1977, is jailed for 37 years, the longest ever sentence handed out by a Scottish court; he will die in prison.
- 18 November – Alex Salmond officially resigns the office of First Minister of Scotland to Queen Elizabeth II and the Scottish Parliament, paving the way for Nicola Sturgeon to take the reins of power.
- 19 November – The Scottish Parliament elects Nicola Sturgeon as the first female First Minister of Scotland.
- 20 November – Nicola Sturgeon is officially sworn in as First Minister of Scotland at the Court of Session in Edinburgh, in front of senior judges.
- 21 November – The launch is announced of The National, Scotland's first daily newspaper to take a pro-independence stance.
- 24 November – Launch of The National, initially on a five-day trial basis.
- 27 November – The Smith Commission, established by David Cameron to look at enhanced devolution for Scotland following the referendum, publishes its report, recommending the Scottish Parliament should be given the power to set income tax rates and bands.

=== December ===
- 1 December – Former UK Prime Minister Gordon Brown announces he is to stand down as an MP from his Scottish seat at the next general election after 32 years.
- 5 December – Scotland reduces its drink-drive limit from 80 mg to 50 mg, bringing its legal limit into line with much of mainland Europe.
- 6 December – Reports surface that former Scottish First Minister Alex Salmond will stand for Parliament in the Gordon constituency at the 2015 general election. Salmond confirms his intention to contest the constituency the following day.
- 13 December – MP Jim Murphy is elected as the new Scottish Labour leader beating MSPs Neil Findlay and Sarah Boyack with 55.7% of the vote, declaring it his "driving purpose" to end poverty and inequality. Meanwhile, Kezia Dugdale is elected as the party's new deputy leader; she also becomes Leader of the Opposition in Holyrood.
- 16 December – Leader of the House of Commons, William Hague, sets out Conservative plans for English votes for English laws to prevent Scottish MPs from voting on legislation that does not affect Scotland.
- 22 December – 2014 Glasgow bin lorry crash: six people are killed after a refuse lorry crashes into a group of people in Queen Street, Glasgow.
- 29 December – The Scottish government confirms a case of Ebola being treated in a Glasgow hospital. The victim is a healthcare worker who had travelled back from Sierra Leone the previous day.
- 31 December – Healthcare worker Pauline Cafferkey receives an unnamed experimental anti-viral drug and blood plasma from Ebola survivors as part of her treatment.

== Arts ==
- Summer – Rona Munro's trilogy The James Plays premiere at the Edinburgh International Festival.

== Deaths ==
- 26 January – Ian Redford, footballer and manager (born 1960)
- 26 January – John Farquhar Munro, MSP (born 1934)
- 5 March – Ailsa McKay, economist and academic (born 1963)
- 4 April – Margo MacDonald, journalist and politician (born 1943)
- 24 April – Sandy Jardine, international footballer and manager (born 1948)
- 3 May – Dick Douglas, Labour, then SNP, Member of Parliament (born 1932)
- 9 May – Mary Stewart, novelist (born 1916 in England)
- 13 June – David MacLennan, theatre actor and producer (born 1948)
- 24 September – Hugh C. Rae, novelist (born 1935)

== See also ==
- 2014 in England
- 2014 in Northern Ireland
- 2014 in Wales
