= Brian Taylor (journalist) =

Scottish journalist (born 1955)

Brian Taylor (born 9 January 1955) is a former political editor for BBC Scotland and columnist for the Scottish broadsheet newspaper The Herald. Taylor – who joined the BBC in 1985 – originally co-presented Left, Right and Centre and was political correspondent prior to his political editor role. He covered politics on television beginning from the 1979 general election.

In 2009, he presented Holyrood and the Search for Scotland's Soul, a documentary by BBC Scotland Investigates to mark the 10th anniversary of the devolved Scottish Parliament.

== Early life ==
Taylor attended the independent High School of Dundee and graduated from the University of St Andrews in 1977 with an MA (Hons) degree in English. Following his graduation, Taylor was employed as a journalist by the Aberdeen-based Press & Journal before a six-year spell as a lobby correspondent at Westminster.

== Career ==
Taylor joined the BBC in 1985, co-presenting the BBC Scotland political programme Left, Right and Centre with Kirsty Wark, and presenting Good Morning Scotland. Following this, he was appointed political correspondent and then political editor in 1991.

Taylor has written two books on Scotland's new Parliament: The Scottish Parliament (Polygon, Edinburgh University Press, 1999), an account of the road to devolution and its consequences; and Scotland's Parliament: Triumph and Disaster (Edinburgh University Press, November 2002), analysing the early years of the new Parliament.

On the 10 September 2020 it was announced that he would retire at the end of October. Glenn Campbell took over in his political editor role the following year.

In February 2021 it was announced that Taylor had joined The Herald as a columnist.

== Personal life ==
Taylor is married with two sons.

Taylor is a keen Dundee United football supporter and attends games regularly. He has presented the club's inaugural Hall of Fame dinner on a number of occasions.

He was awarded an honorary degree by Abertay University in 2010.

Taylor joined Twitter in 2012 and did not tweet anything until 2020 after he retired from BBC Scotland. His lack of tweets made him a Twitter icon who people regularly joke has said something outrageous then deleted it.

Media offices
Preceded by ?	Political Editor: BBC Scotland; 1991–2020	Succeeded by Glenn Campbell
