= Peter Barron =

Public relations head for Google

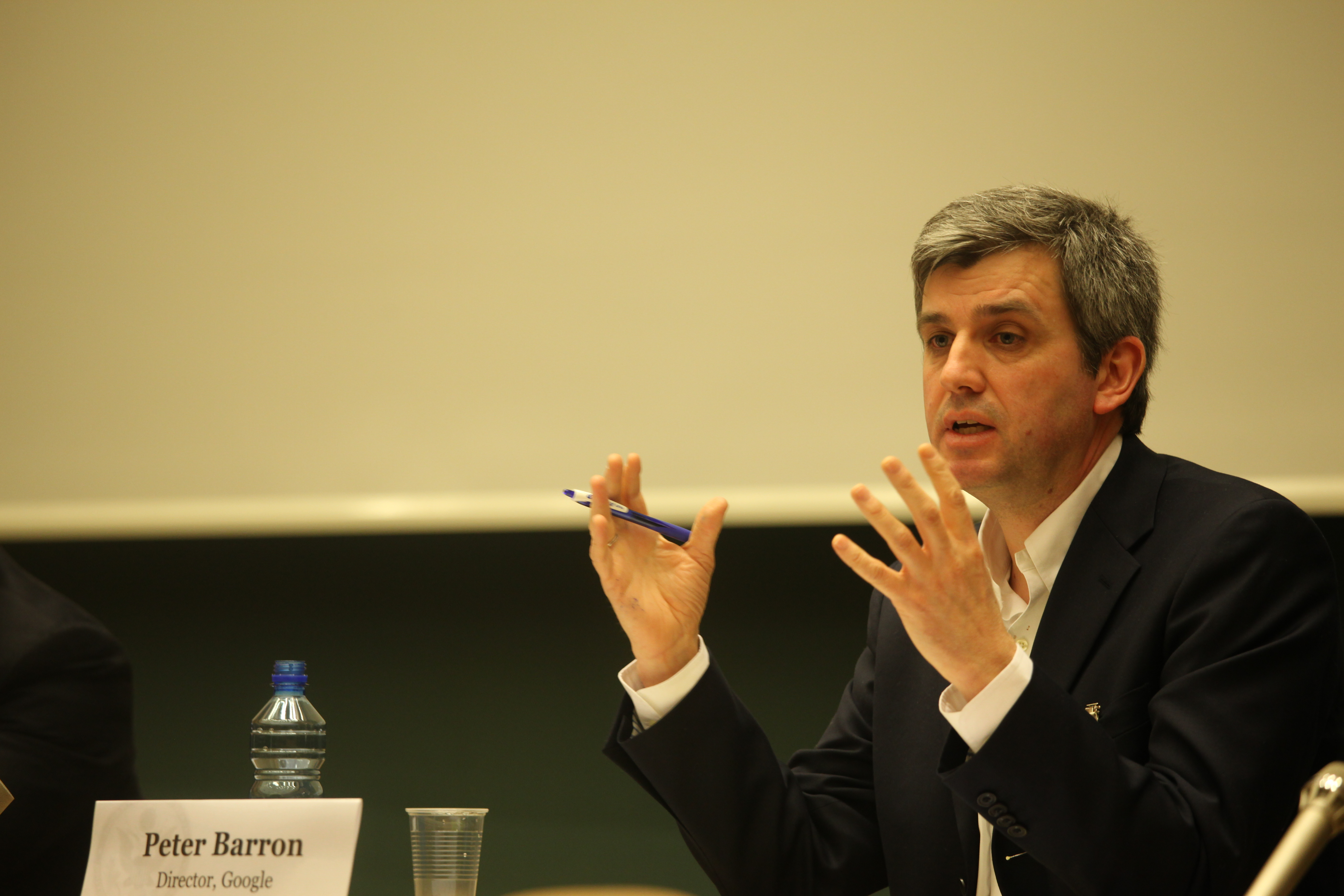
- Born: 1962 (age 63–64); Belfast, Northern Ireland
- Education: Royal Belfast Academical Institution
- Employers: BBC (former); Google (current)

Peter Barron (born 1962) is a Northern Irish journalist and Google's head of communications for Europe, Middle East and Africa.

Peter Barron was born in Belfast and educated at the Royal Belfast Academical Institution. He spent most of his career at the BBC, and immediately prior to his Google appointment in 2008 had for four years been editor of the BBC programme Newsnight.

== Career overview ==
- Mid-1980s, Luxembourg News Digest
- 1987 Editor and journalist, Algarve News and Algarve Magazine
- 1988 BBC News trainee
- 1990 Producer, Newsnight
- 1997 Deputy editor, Channel 4 News, ITN
- 2002 Deputy editor, Tonight with Trevor McDonald
- 2003 Editor, BBC current affairs
- 2004 Editor, Newsnight
- 2006–07 Advisory chair, Edinburgh International TV Festival
- 2008 Head of comms and public affairs, Google UK, Benelux and Ireland

== Awards ==
He won the 1995 Royal Television Society award for Newsnight's coverage of the arms-to-Iraq scandal.

Media offices
Preceded by George Entwistle	Editor: Newsnight; 2004–2008	Succeeded by Peter Rippon
