= Peter Rippon =

British broadcasting executive (born 1965)

Peter William Rippon (born 22 August 1965) is a British broadcasting executive. He is the editor of the BBC Online Archive. He was previously the editor of BBC Television's current affairs programme Newsnight, but he departed due to the controversy over his decision not to broadcast a posthumous investigation into the sexual abuse allegations against Jimmy Savile.

== Early life ==
Rippon was born in Henley-on-Thames. He is the son of Robin Rippon and Susan Westcott. He has an older sister and younger brother and sister.

Rippon attended the Gillotts School, a comprehensive school, in Henley on Thames in the South Oxfordshire district of south-eastern Oxfordshire.

Rippon graduated from the University of East Anglia (UEA) with a BA in Philosophy and Politics, and gained an MSc in International Politics from the University of Southampton.

== BBC career ==
Rippon joined the BBC in 1989 as a trainee. At Radio 4 he became (concurrently) the editor of The World at One, PM, iPM, Broadcasting House and The World This Weekend. He has also edited Newshour for the BBC World Service. Rippon's programmes have won numerous awards including Sony Gold in 2007 for interactivity for PM.

Moving into television, on 7 November 2008 he was appointed the editor of Newsnight following his predecessor, Peter Barron, departing to work for Google.

In 2011, it was found by BARB that the Newsnight audience was on average around 450,000. Ten years previously it was around 1 million. When Rippon was editor, Newsnight was named news programme of the year by the Royal Television Society (2012). It also won Emmy (2009, 2011) and Peabody (2010) awards under his leadership.

=== Newsnight item about Jimmy Savile ===
In late 2011, Rippon spiked an item about the history of the suspected paedophile Jimmy Savile on Newsnight. Rippon argued that the decision was in part based on the Crown Prosecution Service reporting a lack of evidence. Internal emails revealed that his concern was over the fact that the only evidence was from "the women". His editor's blog gives the background of why he, at the time, came to the conclusions that he did. In October 2012, Rippon stepped aside from his role as editor pending an independent review into his decision to drop the investigation into Savile. The Pollard Review into the incident investigated the decision exhaustively. It concluded that Rippon's decision not to air the item was "flawed" but "done in good faith" and without undue pressure from his bosses. Rippon disagreed that his evidence was flawed, setting out his reasons in evidence to the inquiry. In October 2012, the chairman of the BBC Trust, Lord Patten, when interviewed on Radio 4's The Media Show about the Savile affair, remarked "Peter Rippon is a very distinguished editor who broke the story about service companies which we've been having to deal with ever since."

Media offices
Preceded by Peter Barron	Editor: Newsnight; 2008–2012	Succeeded by Ian Katz
Preceded by ?	Editor: The World at One, The World This Weekend; 2007–2008	Succeeded by Jamie Angus
