= Glenn Campbell (broadcaster) =

Scottish broadcaster (born 1976)

- Born: 1976 (age 49–50); Islay, Scotland
- Occupation: Broadcaster
- Notable credit(s): Newsnight Scotland, The Politics Show

Glenn Campbell (born 1976) is a Scottish journalist and broadcaster for BBC Scotland news and current affairs, currently political editor for BBC Scotland. He grew up on Islay and studied at the University of Glasgow.

== Biography ==
His career began in commercial radio. A former head of news and sport at Scot FM, he also presented the station's news magazine 'Lunchtime Live' which won a silver Sony Award in 1999.

Campbell joined BBC Scotland in 2001, originally working for their radio station, BBC Radio Scotland. Currently, he works for their television arm, and has regularly reported and presented on programmes such as Reporting Scotland and Scotland 2016. He also presented the network's coverage of the 2007 Scottish election and contributes regularly on Good Morning Scotland. He has been a stand-in presenter on Radio 4's PM programme. Campbell hosted BBC Scotland's coverage of the 2015 general election and anchored coverage of the 2016 Scottish Parliament election.

On 25 August 2014, Campbell moderated the second Scottish independence debate between Alistair Darling and Alex Salmond in Glasgow. He then hosted the referendum result programme on BBC One Scotland on 18 September 2014.

On 15 December 2020, Campbell was announced as BBC Scotland's political editor, beginning in January 2021.

In August 2023, Campbell announced that he had been diagnosed with brain cancer and was receiving treatment. This was a rare form of brain cancer called a Oligodendroglioma which is incurable, however it is "better" than other types according to Campbell. In the wake of this, Campbell also began fundraising for a charity called 'Brain Tumour Research' to establish the 5th brain tumour research centre in the UK, and to scale up research into brain tumours.

Media offices
Preceded by Brian Taylor	Political Editor: BBC Scotland; 2021–present	Incumbent
