= Tim Whewell =

BBC radio and television journalist

- Education: University College, Oxford; Cardiff School of Journalism, Media and Cultural Studies
- Employer: BBC

Tim Whewell is a radio and television journalist and foreign correspondent with the BBC.

== Life ==
He grew up in Manchester, where his father Harry Whewell worked for the Manchester Guardian, then studied Russian and modern history at University College, Oxford, then trained at Cardiff University's School of Journalism. He was Moscow Correspondent for the BBC World Service from 1990 to 1993. He first worked at the Sheffield Morning Telegraph from 1984, then the Sheffield Star.

In 1991, he broadcast live from the Russian parliament's White House, while it was under siege. His wife Rachel, who worked as his translator, was also in the building. He was foreign reporter for Newsnight for twelve years, until November 2013.

His report on child sacrifices in Uganda for BBC Radio 4's Crossing Continents won the 2010 Best Radio Documentary One World Media Award.
