= Engineering Announcements =

- Also known as: Engineering Announcements for the Radio and Television Trade
- Opening theme: "Current Affairs"; by Francis Monkman (1983–1990)
- Ending theme: same as opening
- Country of origin: United Kingdom
- Original language: English

Production
- Running time: 10 minutes

Original release
- Network: ITV (1970–1983); Channel 4 and S4C (1983–1990)
- Release: 23 November 1970 – 31 July 1990

Engineering Announcements for the Radio and Television Trade, sometimes abbreviated to Engineering Announcements, is a former weekly television program of news and information intended for technicians and salespeople in the United Kingdom, produced and transmitted by the Independent Television Authority (and later the Independent Broadcasting Authority) from 23 November 1970 until 31 July 1990, coming off air five months before the IBA was disbanded.

Engineering Announcements began because the ITA had been getting so many queries about delays to the launch of local relays. The ITA felt that the trade should be kept informed about when stations were to open and that the best way to do this was via a television programme and as time progressed, the broadcast expanded to cover technical advances in the industry, such as the launch of satellite television and NICAM stereo, along with details of new transmitters and the scheduling of transmitter downtime.

Engineering Announcements, and the BBC's similar Service Information, are examples of regularly scheduled "ghost programmes," so called because they were never advertised in on-air schedules, in newspaper TV listings, the TV Times or on teletext.

== Scheduling ==
Engineering Announcements was originally scheduled directly after Monday's Newcomers, another ghost programme which offered the advertising trade the opportunity to watch first runs of new adverts before they aired in prime time on ITV. It was shown at 9:45 a.m. On 18 September 1972, Engineering Announcements moved to 9:10 a.m. on Tuesdays, where it remained until 1983.

The launch of TV-am meant that the ITV network would no longer be available to show the programme at that time although it continued to be shown on ITV for the two months following the launch of TV-am, airing in the gap between the end of TV-am and the start of ITV – the gap was needed to allow for switching ITV from national transmission to the local ITV contractor, and for those two months the programme aired at 9.17am. When this process became automated, this gap was no longer required. TV-am's hours were extended until 9:25 a.m. and consequently the slot used to transmit Engineering Announcements on ITV disappeared. This saw the programme move, on 24 May 1983, to Channel 4 and S4C. It continued to be shown at the same time (Tuesdays at 9:15 a.m.) and a repeat broadcast at 12:15 p.m. was launched with the change of channel, although the lunchtime repeat was not shown on S4C.

The 1980s saw Channel 4's broadcast hours increase and Engineering Announcements was forced into increasingly earlier time slots. The 12:15 p.m. repeat was lost in September 1987 when ITV Schools was transferred to Channel 4/S4C. It then moved to 8:10 a.m. at the start of 1989 and when Channel 4 launched its breakfast television service in April 1989, Engineering Announcements was moved to 5:45 a.m., where it could be recorded by engineers for later viewing. It remained in that slot until the programme's final edition on 31 July 1990. Throughout its time on Channel 4, the theme tune to the programme was "Current Affairs" by Francis Monkman.

Engineering Announcements was the only programme broadcast on ITV during the 1979 strike which saw ITV off the air for ten weeks in all parts of the UK, but not in the Channel Islands, from August until 24 October.
