= 2014 in England =

- Centuries: 19th; 20th; 21st
- Decades: 1990s; 2000s; 2010s; 2020s
- See also: 2013–14 in English football 2014–15 in English football 2014 in the United Kingdom; Other events of 2014

Events from 2014 in England

== Incumbent ==
- Monarch - Elizabeth II
- Prime Minister - David Cameron

== Events ==
=== January ===
- 7 January – Four people are killed when a United States Air Force Sikorsky HH-60G Pave Hawk helicopter, based at RAF Lakenheath in Suffolk, crashes at a nature reserve in Cley next the Sea, north Norfolk.
- 8 January – A jury at the High Court, London returns an 8–2 majority verdict of lawful killing at the inquest into the death of Mark Duggan, whose death at the hands of Trident Gang Crime Command Metropolitan Police firearms officers in August 2011 sparked the 2011 England Riots. This verdict was reached despite the fact the jury also found that Mark Duggan was not holding a gun when he was shot by the police, sparking protests outside the court and in Tottenham.
- 15 January – Birmingham City Council could be forced to sell off some of its assets to pay £1bn of legal claims over equality.
- 16 January – Sir Peter Fahy, the Chief Constable of Greater Manchester Police will face prosecution over safety breaches after an unarmed man was shot dead in Cheshire in March 2012.
- 24 January – Sedgemoor District Council in Somerset declares a "major incident" in flooded areas as forecasters warn of more rain.
- 25 January – Trees are uprooted and structural damaged caused to buildings by lightning as a heavy rainstorm hits the Midlands region.
- 30 January – Figures released by the Met Office indicate Southern England and parts of the Midlands have experienced their highest January rainfall since records began in 1910. The announcement comes as military personnel prepare to help residents in flooded areas of Somerset.

=== February ===
- 1 February – Sally Morgan, the outgoing chair of Ofsted claims she is the victim of a "determined effort" by 10 Downing Street to appoint more Conservatives to key public sector positions.
- 6 February – The Ministry of Defence sends around 40 Royal Marines to the Somerset Levels to help with flood protection as more storms are expected. The Government also provides an extra £30 million for repairs.
- 8 February – Rail links to South West England are cut off as fresh storms hit the area.
- 11 February – After visiting some of the country's flood hit areas, David Cameron says that "money is no object" as he announces measures to help those affected by the storms. He also warns that things may get worse before they get better. 1,600 troops are deployed to help in the relief effort, with more available if needed.
- 20 February – A 4.1 magnitude earthquake is recorded under the Bristol Channel.
- 26 February – The two men convicted of the murder of Lee Rigby are sentenced to life imprisonment, Michael Adebolajo without the possibility of parole, and Michael Adebowale with the possibility of parole after 45 years.
- 28 February – Spree killer Joanne Dennehy is given a whole life sentence for three murders and two attempted murders committed in 2013.

=== March ===
- 5 March – Birmingham City Council is to sell the NEC Group because the authority is facing legal claims over equal pay totalling more than £1bn.
- 11 March – MPs vote 297–239 to allow the controversial Clause 119 element of the Care Bill that will allow ministers to close hospitals in an NHS trust if a neighbouring trust is in financial difficulty, even if the hospital concerned is performing well.

=== May ===
- 7 May – Former Co-operative Bank chairman Paul Flowers is fined £400 after being convicted of possessing cocaine, methamphetamine and ketamine. Flowers stood down from his role at the bank in 2013 due to allegations concerning drug taking, inappropriate expense payments and use of rent boys.

=== June ===
- 9 June – The teaching of creationism is banned from free schools and academies.

=== August ===
- 22 August – Labour candidate David Jamieson is elected as the Police and Crime Commissioner for the West Midlands.

=== November ===
- 11 November – The Bank of England fires former foreign exchange dealer Martin Mallett due to allegations of market manipulation.
- 17 November – The Church of England adopts legislation allowing for appointments of women as bishops.

== See also ==
- 2014 in Northern Ireland
- 2014 in Scotland
- 2014 in Wales
