= Scotland Decides: Salmond versus Darling =

- Presented by: Glenn Campbell
- Starring: Alex Salmond; Alistair Darling
- Country of origin: United Kingdom
- Original language: English

Production
- Production location: Kelvingrove Art Gallery and Museum
- Running time: 90 minutes (approx.)
- Production company: BBC Scotland

Original release
- Network: BBC One Scotland; BBC Two
- Release: 25 August 2014

Scotland Decides: Salmond versus Darling is a Scottish television debate that was first broadcast on BBC One Scotland on 25 August 2014. The 90-minute broadcast marked the second and last face-to-face debate between First Minister Alex Salmond and Alistair Darling before the Scottish independence referendum held on 18 September 2014. The event took place in front of a studio audience of 200 people.

The debate, moderated by Glenn Campbell, saw both politicians make opening statements, cross-examine each other and take questions from the audience. At the end of the clash, they were both given the chance to make a closing speech.

== Responses ==
A snap poll conducted by ICM Research stated Salmond won the debate by 71% to 29%. In an analysis piece for the What Scotland Thinks website, Professor John Curtice said that although the poll showed the majority of undecided voters had thought Salmond had won, it had only a very small effect (less than 1%) on the voting intention figures.

Amongst the national newspapers, The Herald, the Daily Record and The Scottish Sun reckoned that Salmond won. The Scotsman and the Scottish Daily Mail took a different line, highlighting the "heated" nature of the exchanges, which the Mail believed would turn off voters. Some of the headlines referred to the debate as "Salmond fighting back" or "Salmond strikes back", contrasting the outcome of the two debates.

BBC political editor Nick Robinson commented that Darling was "edgy and nervy", while Salmond appeared "better prepared and more confident". Yes Scotland chief executive Blair Jenkins compared the two debates to a European Cup tie in football, implying that Salmond had performed better overall. Speaking for the no campaign, Labour MP Douglas Alexander said that Darling had asked the right questions of Salmond and that there was insufficient clarity in response.

== Broadcast arrangements ==
The audience for the live broadcast on BBC One Scotland reached an audience of 843,000, a 37% share of the television audience in Scotland. Unlike the first debate, which was not broadcast live on television elsewhere in the United Kingdom, the debate was broadcast live on BBC Two in the rest of the United Kingdom. The average audience for the BBC Two broadcast was 1.5 million, representing a 6.8% share. The debate was also simulcast on Sky News and the BBC News Channel. BBC News said the following day that 4.5 million people had watched the debate across its outlets.

== See also ==
- 2010 United Kingdom general election debates
- 2014 Scottish independence referendum
