= John Milne (journalist) =

John Milne (13 May 1942 – 14 July 2014) was a Scottish broadcaster and journalist who was known for presenting BBC Scotland's Reporting Scotland with Mary Marquis in the 1980s and 1990s and Good Morning Scotland on BBC Radio Scotland. Milne was also a presenter on Newsnight Scotland for much of the 2000s.
