= Service Information =

British television broadcast

Service Information is a former weekday broadcast on BBC2 of engineering information for the radio and television trade. These announcements were made by the BBC continuity announcers of the time and were read over basic in-vision captions.

The "programme" was broadcast on BBC2 during trade test transmissions and was not aimed at the general public. It was not billed in the schedule. They went out three times a day 10.00a.m., 11.30a.m., and 2.30p.m. From 20 January 1975, the bulletin was broadcast just once each day, at 10.30a.m.. The transmission times of these bulletins was moved if other programmes were being shown. For example, the Wednesday broadcast from October 1977 onwards was aired at 11.30 a.m. due to Gharbar being shown at 10.20 a.m. The final broadcast took place on 23 December 1982. The IBA (and its predecessor, the ITA) had a similar programme called Engineering Announcements.

== Format ==
In the days of early colour television in Great Britain the BBC2 daytime periods were filled with the colour test card and trade test colour films to help viewers and dealers to test and tune-in their television receivers.

=== Clock ===
Service Information bulletins would be preceded with a clock for two minutes and a catchy theme which was called Walk & Talk, played by the Syd Dale Orchestra, later replaced in 1978 with Swirly by Roger Limb. The clock was electronically recoloured in a variety of colour schemes in order to differentiate it from the clock used for BBC2's main presentation.

=== Transmitters and relays ===
The bulletin would then start with information regarding current transmitters and relays being either on reduced power or off air. This would then be followed with news of brand new transmitters and relays and when they were due to come on air. Details of trade shows or exhibitions next and anything else related to the technical development of colour television at the time. Then there would be a recap of the day's transmitter news followed by a caption showing the address of the BBC Engineering Information Department. Because the bulletin was designed for the trade, not the general public, a degree of prior knowledge was often assumed in the script - notably it was assumed people know where the transmitters mentioned despite the fact that many of them had interesting or unusual names.

=== Trade test colour films ===
The bulletin would then end with a rundown of the trade test colour films being shown on that particular day. "And now we are returning to the colour test card and music until Play School at eleven o'clock" would be a familiar closing phrase.

== Bulletin length ==
Service Information bulletins generally lasted an average of two or three minutes but on Wednesday 25 August 1971, the longest Service Information bulletin known was aired, which ran for 11 minutes.

== Tuning information ==
A Monday to Friday Tuning Information bulletin was added to BBC2 in the heyday of colour coming to BBC1 and ITV from 10 November 1969 to 31 December 1970 at 6.15pm. with an extra transmission for a two-week period from 17 November 1969 until 28 November 1969 broadcast at 4.30pm (Mondays to Fridays).

== Continuity announcers ==
The Service Information spots were often looked at by the BBC as a training ground for their new continuity announcers. Here they could deliver concise and informative speech for a few minutes at a time and broadcast relatively safely to a smaller than usual viewing audience.

Amongst the continuity announcers who could be heard during this period were: David Allan, Michael Birley, Peter Bolgar, John Braban, John Brand, Peter Brook, Andy Cartledge, Malcolm Eynon, Mike Gamble, John Glover, Martin King, John Leeson, Keith Martin, Roger Maude, Tim Nichols, Mel Oxley, Clive Roslin, John Ross-Barnard, Clem Shaw, Peter Shoesmith, Ian De Stains, Richard Straker, John Trevor, Colin Ward Lewis and Robin Whitting.

== Example transcript ==
Here's a sample transcript of a 10 o'clock Service Information bulletin from 24 August 1973 which includes the announcement concerning the last day of trade test colour films being shown.

It's ten o'clock and a very good morning to you from BBC Television. It's time for Service Information for the Television Trade.

First, transmitter information concerning Stockland Hill and Beacon Hill: BBC-1 UHF Stockland Hill has been on reduced power since nine o'clock and will continue so for some time this morning. BBC-2 Beacon Hill has also been on reduced power since nine o'clock remaining so for some time today. I'll just repeat those – BBC-1 UHF Stockland Hill has been on reduced power since nine o'clock and will continue so for some time this morning and BBC-2 Beacon Hill has also been on reduced power since nine o'clock remaining so for some time today.

The BBC Wales 625-line Colour Television Service from Preseley Relay Station in Pembrokeshire has now opened. The BBC-2 Service opens tomorrow. Both channels are subject to engineering tests until the full programme service begins on 1 September. Preseley will serve about 89,000 people mostly in Pembrokeshire but including some in the Western parts of Cardiganshire and Carmarthenshire. Group B aerials with horizontal rods are required for receiving the 625-line transmissions from Preseley and they should be directed towards the site of the station which is about nine miles South of Cardigan. Group B aerials are suitable for both BBC channels, 46 that's BBC Wales and 40 for BBC-2 as well as the other two channels assigned to Preseley 43 for ITV and 50. They should be carefully positioned for optimum reception on the different channels.

Following successful Test Transmissions, the full stereo programme service will be broadcast from the BBC's Holme Moss and Belmont transmitting stations starting tomorrow. Relay Stations at Scarborough, Sheffield, Wensleydale and Windermere will also radiate the stereo programmes. These six stations serve most of Lancashire, Yorkshire, Lincolnshire and parts of adjacent counties and they will bring stereo on Radio One when that's transmitted on VHF, Radio Two and Radio Four to more than eleven and a half million listeners in the North. Radio Three has been transmitted in stereo from Holme Moss for several years but from now on it will use the new pulse-code modulation distribution system along with the other programmes giving a consequent improvement in technical quality. This improvement should also be noticeable to listeners with monophonic equipment. At some receiving locations near the limit of the service areas of the transmitting stations concerned the change from monophonic to stereophonic reception may introduce additional background noise and this can often be reduced by using a more efficient aerial system and listeners in these circumstances should seek the advice of their local radio dealer. Monophonic reception of stereophonic transmissions is not affected in this way.

Well, today is the last day of the trade test colour films which have been transmitted regularly by BBC Television since 1954. But now that there are colour programmes shown on one channel or the other for most of the day the time available for transmission of the test card has been considerably reduced and the need for high quality moving pictures during Trade Tests has diminished. So after consultation with representatives of the Television Trade it's been decided that from next week available time on BBC-2 will mainly be filled by the test card together with Service Information announcements and the Service Information in the afternoons will be at 4:30 instead of 2:30 but will remain at ten o'clock and 11:30 in the mornings. Full details of the new schedule will shortly be published as an information sheet.

Well, today there's more Service Information at half-past eleven and at half-past two this afternoon. And those Colour Films, well the Colour Films being shown in today's Trade Test Transmissions are at eleven-thirty-five Journey Into The Weald Of Kent, at ten-past-twelve Cantagallo, at two-o'clock North Sea Quest, at 2:35 Giuseppina and the last Trade Test Colour Film at 3:30, Coupe Des Alpes.

At four-thirty instead of the usual Trade Test Colour Film, BBC-2 opens-up with coverage of the second day's play in the third test at Lord's.

Well now the colour test card and music are with us until our first scheduled programme of the day Play School at eleven o'clock.

Note that in fact Coupe des Alpes – which had been revived as a finale having not been shown since 1968 – was not shown because cricket coverage began earlier than scheduled, and Guiseppina became the last trade test colour film ever shown.
