= Gordon Brewer =

British news/current affairs broadcaster

- Occupation: BBC Scotland presenter
- Notable credit: Newsnight Scotland

Gordon Brewer is a Scottish news and current affairs broadcaster, who worked for BBC Scotland. He presented the flagship Newsnight Scotland programme from 1999.

== Early life ==
He was educated St Modan's High School in Stirling, followed by the University of Edinburgh, where he studied Philosophy and English Literature.

== Life and career ==
Brewer began his career in journalism at The Shetland Times in 1980 and in 1983 he moved to the Sunday Standard (forerunner of the Sunday Herald) as business correspondent. After the Standard stopped publishing he held a number of jobs in the Scottish press. He was also a member of the Trotskyist group Socialist Organiser.

Brewer joined the BBC in 1988 as Business Correspondent for network TV news and was appointed the BBC's Tokyo Correspondent the following year. During four years in the Far East he mixed news coverage with making films for Newsnight, The Money Programme and Assignment. Despite strenuous attempts to learn Japanese, the nearest he got to fluency was with cab drivers after an evening in the bar. He returned from Japan in 1993 to join Newsnight in London, where he was a reporter and later a presenter.

In 1999, he became the presenter for Holyrood, and Political Scotland. In 2007 the series were merged into The Politics Show Scotland, and Politics Scotland.
