= Anne MacKenzie (journalist) =

Scottish political and current affairs presenter (born 1961)

Anne Mackenzie
- Born: Anne Erica Isobel Mackenzie; Stornoway, Isle of Lewis
- Education: Nicholson Institute; Glasgow University
- Occupations: Newsreader; TV presenter
- Notable credit(s): Reporting Scotland (BBC); North Tonight (ITV); Crossfire (ITV); We The Jury (ITV); Newsnight Scotland (BBC); The World Tonight (BBC R4); Four Corners (BBC R4)
- Spouse: Neil McConaghy (m. 1992)
- Children: 1

Anne Erica Isobel Mackenzie is a former BBC political and current affairs presenter. Mackenzie worked as a newscaster between 1981 and 1997. She started her career with Grampian TV, in Aberdeen, before joining BBC Scotland in 1995. She became a political and current affairs presenter in 1998, anchoring several BBC network programmes. Mackenzie was also part of the Newsnight Scotland team, with BBC Scotland, from its launch in October 1999 to July 2007. She could also be heard fronting factual programmes for BBC Radio 4 in London.

== Early years ==
Mackenzie was born in Stornoway and grew up on the peninsula of Point, Outer Hebrides. Her mother Katie Ann (née Maclean; 1924–1979), was a midwife, and her father Donald (1924-1996) was a postmaster at his parents' post office in Portnaguran. Donald Mackenzie also fought in the Second World War. She has one brother, Lewis, who has a PhD in physics and is a senior lecturer in the Department of Computing Science at the University of Glasgow.

A student of the Nicolson Institute in Stornoway, Mackenzie left for the mainland to study history at the University of Glasgow. She graduated with an MA Honours and had intended to become a teacher. She returned to the Isle of Lewis, where she met a producer for Grampian TV, (now STV North), who was on holiday. He offered her a screen test, and she embarked on a career as a journalist and broadcaster that spanned more than twenty five years.

== Career ==
=== The Grampian years ===
In 1981, she became a trainee journalist at the age of twenty. She reported and co-hosted the regional TV station's news programme North Tonight for fourteen years.

Throughout the eighties, North Tonight was replaced by Summer at Six during the summer months, which was a more informal lifestyle magazine with a brief news summary. Mackenzie was involved in the news output during this period.

Mackenzie hosted the political show Crossfire from the Autumn 1987. She also presented several regional affairs shows, such as We The Jury and One Life To Live. She was involved in Grampian's coverage of the 1988 Piper Alpha disaster. Anne Mackenzie also fronted many North Tonight specials for the station. In 1989 she interviewed the then prime minister, Margaret Thatcher, from Grampian's Dundee studios.

During her time at Grampian Television, Mackenzie was nicknamed 'the duchess' for being the top female at the television station.

Although Mackenzie no longer worked on North Tonight she continued to present "We The Jury" in 1996.

=== Switching channels ===
Anne Mackenzie left North tonight and was recruited by the BBC in September 1995. She presented her first edition of Scotland's national news programme, Reporting Scotland, on Wednesday 6 December 1995. She went on to host every Wednesday early evening broadcast. She also presented Good Morning Scotland on BBC Radio Scotland three mornings a week.

Mackenzie's bosses offered her another night fronting the nightly broadcast. She was now at the helm every Tuesday and Wednesday night. Mackenzie continued her work with Radio Scotland and also fronted political shows, including Cross Examination. Anne Mackenzie was involved in BBC Scotland's coverage of the 1996 Dunblane Massacre.

Later that year she reported for the BBC network current affairs show Here and Now, with Sue Lawley. Mackenzie also anchored several BBC Scotland current affairs programmes, fronting an economic debate programme called, Grasping the Thistle.

In October 1997, Mackenzie left Radio Scotland as part of schedule changes to Reporting Scotland. She would now host the programme with Jackie Bird on alternate nights, as part of a mini revamp of the broadcast. This was short lived, as she left the show two months later, in December 1997, to front London-based Westminster Live.

Mackenzie hosted Westminster Live from 20 January 1998. She was also a regular stand in for David Frost on the Breakfast with Frost programme in 1998 (and again in 2000). She also presented the BBC's late night political programme Despatch Box

=== A new era ===
In August 1999 it was announced that she had been chosen to present Newsnight Scotland with Gordon Brewer. On 6 October 1999, she was part of the launch team for Newsnight Scotland, BBC Scotland's late night news and current affairs programme, which was a response to the creation of the newly devolved Scottish government. She was a regular presenter on the programme, usually presenting the show every Thursday night.

Mackenzie was involved in the station's political coverage during Westminster and Holyrood elections. She has reported for BBC Scotland in the 1997 and 2001 general elections and the 1999 and 2003 Scottish parliamentary elections. During the 2003 campaign, Anne Mackenzie interviewed all the Scottish party leaders and chaired The Big Debate for BBC Scotland.

On 5 May 2005, Mackenzie presented the UK election coverage for BBC Scotland from a 'Scottish perspective'. This was the first time BBC Scotland's Election Night programme was broadcast on BBC One Scotland.

Anne Mackenzie was also a presenter on BBC Radio 4 in London, where she presented The World Tonight, before moving to the Four Corners factual series.

On 29 March 2007, the BBC announced that Anne Mackenzie would front BBC One network coverage of Election Night 2007 and would continue to host The Big Debate series for BBC Scotland throughout the election campaign. Mackenzie also teamed up with David Dimbleby for the main BBC broadcast on 3 May 2007.

=== Formidable interviewer ===
Some commenters saw Mackenzie as a fierce interviewer. Gavin Docherty of the Sunday Mail wrote in 1999: "She is best known for her confrontational interview style - and the politicians know there is always the chance she'll jump down their throat and dance all over their tonsils".

=== Award winner ===
Anne Mackenzie was recognised in 1995 with a BAFTA award. This was for her work for the North Tonight nightly broadcast. In 1999, she hosted the first ever Scottish Politician of the Year Awards on STV.

She was voted among the Top 50 Most Powerful Scottish Women in a poll for the Scotsman newspaper.

== Personal life ==
Mackenzie married Neil McConaghy in 1992 at an Aberdeen church. They have a son named Jack Donald Stewart, who was born in September 1998. She lists reading and music as her main hobbies.

== See also ==
- Newsnight Scotland
- Isle of Lewis

== Sources ==
- Secrets of My XS, Sunday Mail - 6 December 1998.
- Interview with Gavin Docherty, Sunday Mail - 11 April 1999.
- Dr. Lewis MacKenzie at the University of Glasgow website
