= Newsnight =

BBC television current affairs programme

- Title branding as of 2024
- Genre: News and current affairs
- Created by: BBC News
- Presented by: Victoria Derbyshire; Paddy O'Connell; Matt Chorley
- Theme music composer: George Fenton
- Country of origin: United Kingdom
- Original language: English

Production
- Producer: BBC News
- Production locations: Studios TC5 and N2 BBC Television Centre (1980–1987): Studio TC2, BBC Television Centre (1987–1997); Studio TC7, BBC Television Centre (1997–2012); Studio B, Broadcasting House (2012–20); Studio E, Broadcasting House (2020); Studio 54D, Broadcasting House (2020–present); Various UK bases (2022–present)
- Editor: Jonathan Aspinwall
- Running time: 30 minutes

Original release
- Network: BBC Two; BBC News (UK feed); BBC News (world)
- Release: 28 January 1980 – present

Related
- Any Answers? Any Questions? The Big Questions; Dateline London; HARDtalk; Question Time

Newsnight is the BBC's news and current affairs television programme, providing in-depth investigation and analysis of the stories behind the day's headlines. It is broadcast Monday to Thursday nights at 22:30 on BBC Two and the BBC News channel, with the programme's Friday edition airing only on BBC Two at 19:00. ; it is also available on BBC iPlayer. The programme is currently presented by Victoria Derbyshire, Paddy O'Connell and Matt Chorley.

== History ==
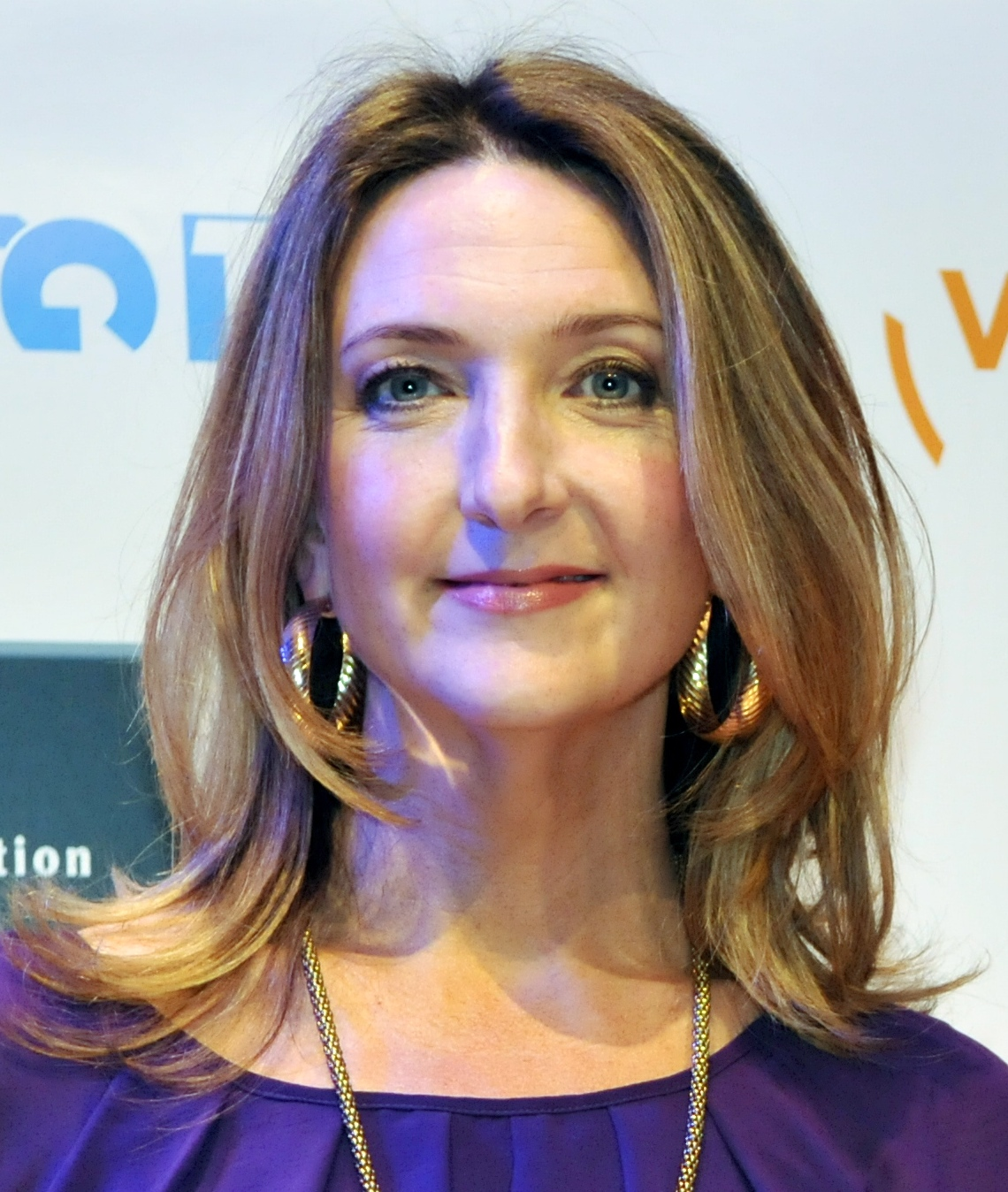
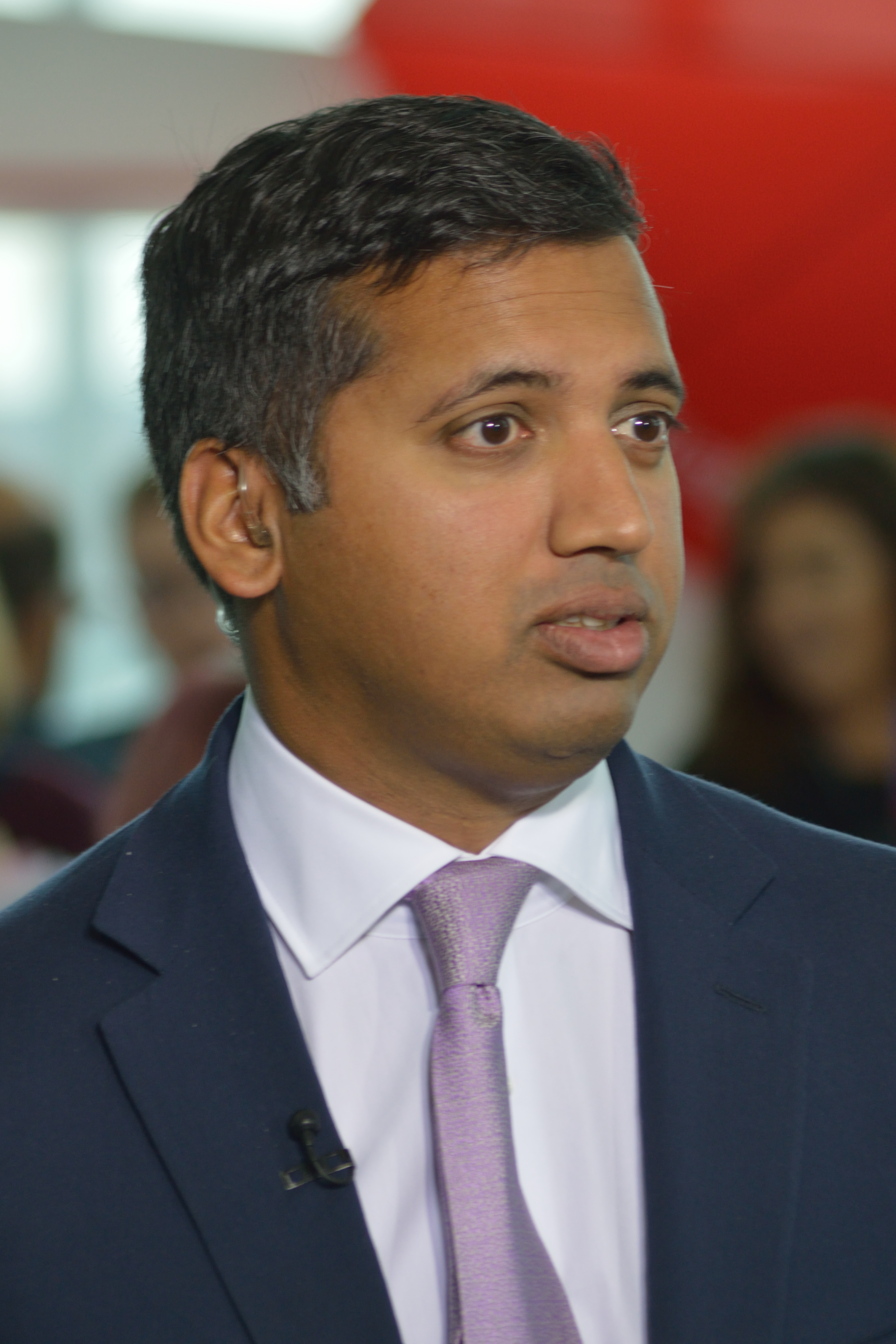
Current Newsnight presenters: Victoria Derbyshire (left) and Faisal Islam.

Newsnight began on 28 January 1980 at 22:45, although a 15 minute news bulletin using the same title had run on BBC2 for a 13 month period from 1975 to 1976. Its planned September 1979 launch date was delayed by four months by the Association of Broadcasting Staff, at the time the main BBC trade union. Newsnight was the first programme to be made by means of a direct collaboration between BBC News, based at Television Centre, and the current affairs department, based nearby at the now defunct Lime Grove Studios. Staff feared job cuts. The newscast also served as a replacement for the current affairs programme Tonight.

Former presenters include Jeremy Paxman, Peter Snow, Donald MacCormick, Charles Wheeler, Adam Raphael and John Tusa, later managing director of the BBC World Service. In the early days each edition had an "auxiliary presenter", a phenomenon pejoratively known at the time as the "Newsnight's wife syndrome". Usually a woman, it was her job to read the news headlines and to introduce minor items. Olivia O'Leary in 1985 became the first principal female presenter; the programme has had a single presenter since 1987. The program is now wholly managed by BBC News.

Until 1988 the start time of Newsnight was flexible, enabling BBC2 to screen a full-length movie at 21:30 to dovetail with the end of the Nine O'Clock News on BBC1. However, BBC News and Current Affairs, then controlled by John Birt, wanted a fixed start time for Newsnight at 22:30 so that viewers would "always know" when it was on. The managing director of BBC Television, Bill Cotton, who was responsible for all TV scheduling, strongly opposed Birt's campaign, fearing it would severely restrict his scheduling freedom. But Birt persuaded the BBC director-general, Michael Checkland, to back the change - which Checkland then announced at a press conference without warning Cotton, who was in the audience. Cotton fought a fierce campaign inside and outside the BBC to reverse the decision - so fierce that one protagonist said it would "destroy the BBC". but the move to a fixed start time began on 31 October 1988 and remains to the present day.

Between 1999 and 2014 on BBC Two Scotland the offshoot, Newsnight Scotland, presented by Gordon Brewer, replaced the final twenty minutes of the UK programme from Monday to Friday. From May 2014, Newsnight has been shown in full in Scotland, although delayed by half an hour to accommodate Newsnight Scotland's replacement, Scotland 2014. In more recent years, Scottish viewers have seen the full edition of the show without a separate programme. The flagship news programmes for BBC Scotland are now shown on their separate channel.

Newsnight moved to new facilities at Broadcasting House on 15 October 2012.

In 2020, Newsnight won the Royal Television Society's Daily News Programme of the Year award. It was succeeded in 2021 by the ITV News at Ten.

During the COVID-19 pandemic, Newsnight reverted to a 22:45 start time from 30 March 2020. This was due to Newsnight temporarily sharing a studio with the BBC News at Ten during the pandemic, to cut footfall in Broadcasting House and allow turnover in the studio, with the News at Ten not finishing until 22:35. Further, during the pandemic, some editions presented by Kirsty Wark were presented from BBC Scotland's Pacific Quay headquarters in Glasgow. However, Wark still travelled to London during weeks she presented more episodes of the show (for example when main presenter Emily Maitlis was on holiday).

In October 2020 the show moved to a new studio, but continued to broadcast from 22:45. It returned to the 22:30 slot in May 2021.

Newsnight's signature tune was composed by George Fenton. Various arrangements have been used over the years.

There has been much debate over the role and format of Newsnight. In 2018 a former Newsnight editor, John Morrison, wrote in Radio Times that the gap Newsnight once filled ("covering serious news including the arts and sciences in depth, and with probing interviews") had now largely been filled by other programmes earlier in the day. The BBC, he said, had failed to come up with a replacement. The Corporation's plan now, he suggested, was simply to "starve Newsnight of resources and eventually it will just fade away." To ensure its survival, he suggested, among other changes, cutting the programme length from 45 to 30 minutes and "beefing up the interview booking desk." On 29 November 2023, it was announced that Newsnight would be revamped as a 30-minute "interview, debate and discussion" programme, ditching its special reporting team. Jobs within the programme were to be reduced from 57 to 23. The new format was launched on 28 May 2024.

On 1 September 2025, a new drone sequence was introduced, showcasing a number of exterior shots of Broadcasting House, which replaced the still "live" shot which was used prior.

On 18 September 2026, the Friday edition moved to a new peak-time slot, airing at 19:00. The 22:30 start time remains in place on the other days of the week.

=== Viewing figures ===
The programme's average audience in 2015 was 579,000, compared to 867,000 in 2008.

The average audience was 344,000 in September 2018 and by August 2020 around 300,000.

In January 2020, Victoria Derbyshire said Newsnight's audience figures were 297,000.

The new format has been deemed a success with more than one million people watching the 28 February 2025 edition. The programme attracts a third more viewers than it had done pre-reforms to the format with an average of 500,000 viewers over a week-long period.

== Notable interviews ==
=== Jeremy Paxman interviews Michael Howard ===
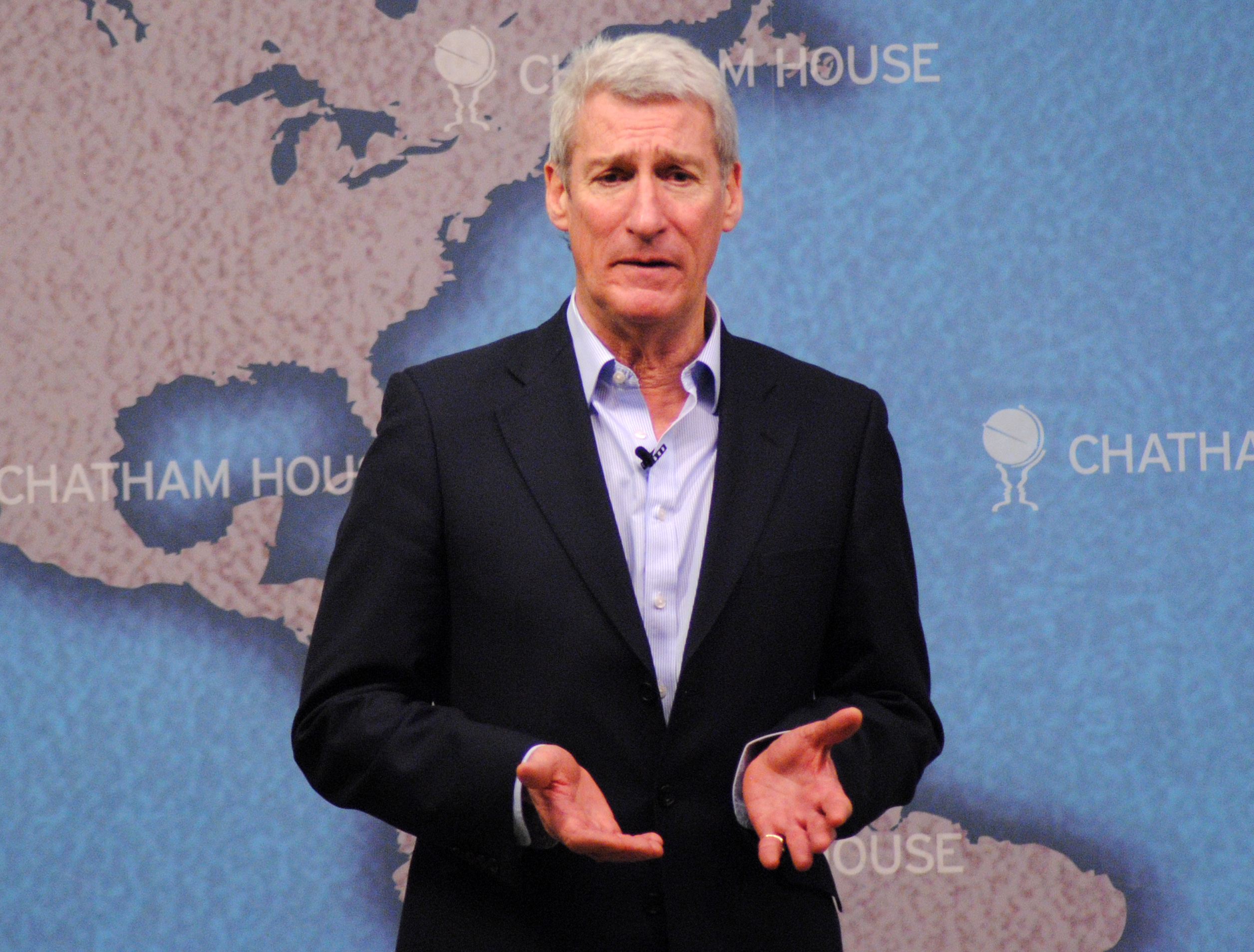
Jeremy Paxman in February 2014

In May 1997, Jeremy Paxman interviewed former Home Secretary Michael Howard about a meeting with head of the Prison Service Derek Lewis about the possible dismissal of the governor of Parkhurst Prison. Faced with what he considered evasive answers, Paxman put the same question – "Did you threaten to overrule him?" (i.e. Lewis) – to Howard twelve times in succession.

This has become one of the programme's best known interviews. Later, during the twentieth anniversary edition of Newsnight, Paxman told Howard that he had simply been trying to prolong the interview because the next item in the running order was not ready. In 2004, Paxman raised the subject again with Howard, by then leader of the Conservative Party to get a final answer. This time, Howard laughed it off, saying that he had not threatened to overrule the head of the Prison Service. During Paxman's final show in June 2014, Howard briefly appeared in the studio once more, with Paxman simply asking "Did you?", to which Howard replied "No, Jeremy, I didn't, but feel free to ask another 11 times."

=== Emily Maitlis interviews Prince Andrew, Duke of York ===
In November 2019, Emily Maitlis interviewed Prince Andrew, Duke of York about his relationship with convicted sex offender Jeffrey Epstein, who was found dead in August 2019 whilst awaiting trial. The interview had taken months to prepare and Maitlis received approval only 48 hours before the scheduled airdate.

In the interview, Andrew denied having sex with Virginia Giuffre (then known by her maiden name Virginia Roberts) in March 2001, as she had accused, because he had been at home with his daughters, having taken his elder daughter, Beatrice, to a party at PizzaExpress in Woking. The Duke said that he had "no recollection of ever meeting" Giuffre and that he had "absolutely no memory" of a photograph taken of him with Giuffre at Ghislaine Maxwell's house. He said he had investigations carried out to establish whether the photograph was faked, but they had been "inconclusive".

Mountbatten-Windsor's responses in the interview received negative reactions from both the media and the public. Maitlis won the Network Presenter of the Year award at the RTS Television Journalism Awards in 2020, and the interview was given awards for Interview of the Year and Scoop of the Year.

The interview and events surrounding it have twice been dramatised. In 2024 Netflix released Scoop, and in the same year Prime Video released a three-part mini-series, A Very Royal Scandal.

== Accusations of bias ==
In April 2001, the BBC's Board of Governors ruled that Newsnight's coverage of Peter Mandelson's resignation over the Hinduja affair had been politically biased. The governors criticised the programme for featuring only Labour Party supporters on the panel discussing the issue, and for not including opposition politicians in the coverage. The broadcast caused an outcry in the media. One critic described it as a "whitewash worthy of a one-party state".

The BBC judged Emily Maitlis to have broken BBC rules on impartiality in the introduction to the 26 May 2020 edition, when she said "the country can see" that Dominic Cummings had "broken the [COVID-19 lockdown] rules." As a result, she said, the public mood was "one of fury, contempt and anguish." The BBC said that while the programme contained "fair, reasonable and rigorous journalism", it was "not made clear" that the remarks referred to questions to be examined in the rest of the programme.

When Boris Johnson became prime minister in July 2019 his ministers generally refused invitations to appear on the programme. This resulted in Newsnight presenters stating on an almost nightly basis that the government had been asked to appear but that "no one was available" or that they had declined outright. On 12 January 2022, Jacob Rees-Mogg made a rare government appearance on the programme to defend the government's position on "lockdown parties" at 10 Downing Street which occurred during the COVID-19 pandemic. Mogg referred to Scottish Conservatives leader Douglas Ross as "quite a lightweight figure".

== Coverage of sexual abuse scandals ==
In the weeks after the ITV documentary Exposure: The Other Side of Jimmy Savile was broadcast on 3 October 2012, allegations were made that a Newsnight investigation into Savile by reporter Liz MacKean and producer Meirion Jones in December 2011 had been dropped shortly before transmission because it conflicted with tribute programmes prepared after Savile's death. The BBC appointed Nick Pollard, a former Sky News executive, to examine why the investigation was dropped. On 23 October, the Director-General of the BBC, George Entwistle, appeared before the Parliamentary Culture, Media and Sport Committee, and stated that it had been a "catastrophic mistake" to cancel the Newsnight broadcast.

On 2 November 2012, Newsnight broadcast a report falsely accusing, but not naming, a prominent Conservative, Lord McAlpine of child abuse. The veracity of this story collapsed after The Guardian reported a case of mistaken identity on 8 November and the victim retracted the allegation after belatedly being shown a photograph of McAlpine in an item broadcast on the following day. The production team had not contacted McAlpine about the allegations. An apology about the story was made on 9 November during that evening's broadcast of the programme. In an official statement, the BBC announced all ongoing Newsnight investigations were being suspended. The Director of BBC Scotland, Ken MacQuarrie, investigated the circumstances around the programme. His findings were published on 12 November and stated that:

The editorial leadership of the team was under very considerable pressure...[T]here was ambiguity around who was taking the ultimate editorial responsibility for the [BBC] Newsnight report, particularly in the days leading up to the day of transmission.... During the editorial decision-making process, some of the basic journalistic checks were not completed.... There was a different understanding by the key parties about where the responsibility lay for the final editorial sign[-]off for the story on the day.

The BBC announced that Karen O'Connor would take on the role of Acting Editor of Newsnight.

The Pollard report was published on 19 December 2012. It concluded that the decision to drop the original Newsnight report on the allegations against Savile in December 2011 was "flawed", but that it had not been done to protect the Savile tribute programmes. However, it criticised George Entwistle for apparently failing to read emails warning him of Savile's "dark side", and that, after the allegations against Savile eventually became public, the BBC fell into a "level of chaos and confusion [that] was even greater than was apparent at the time". The BBC announced that Newsnight editor Peter Rippon and deputy editor Liz Gibbons would be replaced.

== Past elements ==
=== Newsnight Review ===
From February 2001 until December 2009, on Friday evenings Newsnight was followed at 23:00 by Newsnight Review, a 35-minute consumer survey of the week's artistic and cultural highlights. Mark Lawson was the programme's main presenter in its Late Review incarnation, which began life as a strand of The Late Show. He continued to chair the panel of guest reviewers when it was relaunched as Newsnight Review in 2000, up until December 2005. The programme was presented by Kirsty Wark, Martha Kearney, John Wilson, Tim Marlow, Kwame Kwei-Armah and Hardeep Singh Kohli. Regular reviewers included Mark Kermode, Tom Paulin, Ekow Eshun and Germaine Greer.

As part of the BBC's commitment to moving programmes out of London, Newsnight Review finished on 18 December 2009 with a special hour-long edition. The programme was replaced by The Review Show, produced from Glasgow, which started on 22 January 2010. It had the same producer as Newsnight Review and was still presented by Kirsty Wark and Martha Kearney.

=== Closing segments and frivolity ===
Traditionally, there was a short stock market update at the end of each edition. In 2005, Newsnight's then editor, Peter Barron, replaced it with a 30-second weather forecast, arguing that the market data was available on the internet and that a weather forecast would be "more useful". The change provoked a flurry of complaints.

Paxman on one occasion adopted a sarcastic tone and announced: "So finally and controversially, tomorrow's weather forecast. It's a veritable smorgasbord. Sun, rain, thunder, hail, snow, cold, wind. Almost worth going to work." On other occasions: "It's April, what do you expect?" and "Take an umbrella with you tomorrow." He claimed, nonetheless, that he was happy presenting the weather. Gavin Esler also joined in, announcing: "As for the spring, you can forget about that until further notice." The programme conducted a telephone poll. Michael Fish, a former weather forecaster, was seen arguing in favour of the weather forecast, while Norman Lamont, a former Chancellor of the Exchequer, argued for the market update. 62% of viewers voted in favour of the markets, and the update duly returned on Monday 18 April 2005.

Other stunts included, for a week at the end of January 2006, Newsnight playing the Radio 4 UK Theme, which was facing the axe, over its closing credits, while the edition of 24 April 2006 played out to the signature tune of the soon-to-be-axed BBC sports programme, Grandstand. In 2005, following a discussion about the return of Doctor Who to television after a nine-year absence, the programme ended with the TARDIS dematerialisation sound, while presenter Jeremy Paxton faded from view as if dematerialising like the fictional ship.

Between January and June 2006 the programme included Gordaq, a spoof stock market index measuring the political performance of Chancellor of the Exchequer Gordon Brown. The index started at 100 and moved up or down depending on Brown's political situation, finishing at 101 on 30 June 2006.

In an early day motion of 3 November 2016, as a celebration of the "Brexit" vote for UK withdrawal from the European Union, Conservative Party MP Andrew Rosindell argued for a return to the broadcasting of "God Save the Queen" at the end of BBC One transmissions each day. The practice was dropped in 1997 ostensibly due to BBC One adopting 24-hour broadcasting by simulcasting BBC News 24 overnight, rendering closedown obsolete. That evening, Newsnight ended its broadcast with host of that night Kirsty Wark saying that they were "incredibly happy to oblige" Rosindell's request, before playing out to the video of the Sex Pistols' punk song of the same name, much to Rosindell's discontent.

== Other media ==
Newsnight is available in the UK on BBC iPlayer for up to thirty days after broadcast. A weekly digest version of Newsnight used to be screened on both the UK and international BBC News channels, focusing on "the best of the week's films and discussions." In April 2025, following the cancellation of HARDtalk and Click, the daily edition of Newsnight was added to the international feed.

From August 2013, Newsnight had a dedicated YouTube channel on which excerpts of programmes could be found. The channel was not updated between September 2020 and May 2024, in the intervening time period, sections of the episodes were being released on BBC News' main YouTube channel. As of 2026, the channel has been rebranded to BBC Politics and now hosts excerpts of various political programmes alongside Newsnight.

KCET, an independent public television station in Los Angeles, broadcasts the weekly digest version.

Segments of Newsnight are also distributed via the independent YouTube channels of the programme's guests. This includes a segment featuring Ash Sarkar in May 2023 which was reposted on the Novara Media channel as the video "Ash Sarkar Bodies The Royals on BBC Newsnight," generating 122,463 views.

== Presenters, editors, and correspondents ==
=== Presenters ===
Presenter	Role
Victoria Derbyshire	Main presenter (Monday-Wednesday)
Paddy O'Connell	Main presenter (Thursday)
Matt Chorley	Main presenter (Friday)
Katie Razzall	Relief presenters
Faisal Islam	Relief presenters
Adam Fleming	Relief presenters
Lucy Hockings	Occasional preseters
Christian Fraser	Occasional preseters
Alex Forsyth	Occasional preseters

=== Editors and correspondents ===
Editor	Role
David Grossman	Chief correspondent
Nicholas Watt	Political editor and Relief presenter

== Past presenters and reporters ==
- Peter Snow, 1980–1997
- John Tusa, 1980–1986
- David Sells, 1980–2006
- Peter Hobday, 1980–1983
- Will Hutton, 1983–1988
- Jenni Murray, 1984–1986
- Olivia O'Leary, 1985–1986
- Adam Raphael, 1987–1988
- Gordon Brewer, 1993–1999 (subsequently hosted Newsnight Scotland)
- Steve Scott
- Martha Kearney (presenter and political editor), 1994–2010
- Sarah Montague, 1998–2001
- James Cox
- Donald MacCormick
- Eddie Mair (guest presenter)
- Jon Sopel (guest presenter)
- Francine Stock
- Sue Cameron
- Allegra Stratton (political editor)
- Charles Wheeler
- Jeremy Vine, 1999–2002
- Michael Crick (political editor)
- Paul Mason (economics editor)
- Gavin Esler, 2003–2014
- Jeremy Paxman, 1989–2014
- Emma Barnett, 2018–2022
- Mark Urban
- Evan Davis, 2014–2018
- Katie Razzall (relief presenter), 2020
- James O'Brien
- Susan Watts (science editor)
- Nimrod Kamer (Buzz and youth correspondent)
- Laura Kuenssberg (presenter and chief correspondent), 2014–2015
- Kavita Puri
- Liz MacKean
- Tim Whewell
- Greg Palast
- Emily Maitlis, 2006–2022
- Lewis Goodall (policy editor), 2020–2022
- Roger Cook, 1980–1985
- Kirsty Wark 1993–2024

== Newsnight editors ==
- George Carey (1980–1981)
- Ron Neil (1981–1982)
- David Lloyd (1982–1983)
- David Dickinson (1983–1985)
- Richard Tait (1985–1987)
- John Morrison (1987–1990)
- Tim Gardam (1990–1993)
- Peter Horrocks (1994–1997)
- Sian Kevill (1998–2001)
- George Entwistle (2001–2004)
- Peter Barron (2004–2008)
- Peter Rippon (2008–2012)
- Ian Katz (2013–2017)
- Esme Wren (2018–2021)
- Stewart Maclean (2022–2024)

== Footnotes ==
- Newsnight 25. BBC mini-site to mark Newsnight's 25th anniversary in 2005
- Newsnight at 20: the awkward squad, Broadcast, 28 January 2000
