= Newsnight Scotland =

1999–2014 current affairs TV series

- Presented by: Gordon Brewer; Glenn Campbell

Production
- Producer: BBC Scotland News
- Production locations: BBC Pacific Quay, Glasgow, Scotland
- Running time: 20 minutes

Original release
- Network: BBC Two Scotland; BBC Scotland
- Release: 4 October 1999 – 22 May 2014

Related
- Newsnight; Reporting Scotland

Newsnight Scotland is a current affairs television programme, broadcast by BBC Scotland from BBC Pacific Quay in Glasgow as an opt out of the main London-based Newsnight programme. It was broadcast at 11pm from Mondays to Thursdays, replacing the last twenty minutes of Newsnight on BBC Two Scotland, now BBC Scotland.

The programme was presented by Glenn Campbell on Mondays, and Gordon Brewer fronted the programme on Tuesday, Wednesdays and Thursdays. Isobel Fraser, Sally Magnusson and Radio Scotland's Good Morning Scotland co-presenter Gary Robertson also appeared on the show as stand-in presenters. In 1999, the programme had a Friday edition with a brief news summary before being dropped. The programme's original presenters were Anne Mackenzie and Gordon Brewer between 1999 and 2007.

It was broadcast from Studio C at Pacific Quay Studios in Glasgow, using the same set as Reporting Scotland.

== History ==
Newsnight Scotland came about as a result of calls for a Scottish-based version of the BBC Six O'Clock News (the so-called "Scottish Six") following the vote in favour of Scottish devolution. As this did not come about a 'compromise' was then reached in 1999, when Newsnight Scotland was devised. Its creation was somewhat controversial, with Jeremy Paxman describing it as a "damn fool idea" and a "dog’s breakfast", there was also disagreement both inside and outside the organisation regarding Scottish withdrawal from BBC as a political stunt. A number of newspapers at the time also predicted its demise.

First broadcast on Monday 4 October 1999, it was originally presented by a team of three; Gordon Brewer, John Milne and Anne Mackenzie. Newsnight Scotland covered all topical and political issues that affect Scotland. Often the issues derived from the goings-on at the Scottish Parliament in Holyrood. The programme investigated many topics, including the costs of the construction of the Holyrood site. It reported in great detail about the decisions leading to this, including the competition for Scotland's new Parliament. The biggest story covered was the Parliament itself; with extensive coverage of the Fraser Inquiry.

The series was criticised again in 2008, when Gordon Brewer asserted that a broader view of the news was needed and that it wasn't sufficient to simply "put a kilt" on UK and international stories.

=== Cancellation ===
In February 2014, BBC announced Newsnight Scotland would end during 2014 and be replaced by Scotland 2014 as part of a shake up of BBC Scotland's referendum coverage. The final edition was broadcast on 22 May 2014.

== Team ==
The Newsnight Scotland on-air team at the end of the programme's tenure consisted of the following;

=== Main anchors ===
- Gordon Brewer
- Gary Robertson (stand-in)
- Glenn Campbell
- Isobel Fraser (stand-in)

=== Reporters ===
- Ken Macdonald
- Julie Peacock
- David Henderson
- Derek Bateman

=== Past presenters/reporters ===
- Abeer MacIntyre
- Anne Mackenzie
- John Milne

== Awards ==
The Newsnight Scotland team were rewarded for their work in bringing environmental issues to a wider public audience at the 2003 British Environmental Media Awards (BEMAs) in London. The award was for a report from Newfoundland, concerning the collapse of the Canadian cod fisheries.

== See also ==
- BBC Scotland
- BBC News
- Scotland 2016
