= Scotland 2016 =

- Presented by: Sarah Smith; Jonathan Sutherland (Thursday evenings), Shelley Jofre

Production
- Producer: BBC Scotland News
- Production locations: BBC Pacific Quay, Glasgow, Scotland
- Running time: 30 minutes

Original release
- Network: BBC Two Scotland
- Release: 28 May 2014 – 14 December 2016

Related
- Newsnight Scotland (1999–2014); Newsnight; Reporting Scotland; An Là

Scotland 2016 is a news and current affairs programme from BBC Scotland News, presented by Sarah Smith and Jonathan Sutherland. Starting 28 May 2014, it was called Scotland 2014 before being renamed to reflect the year. It replaced Newsnight Scotland as BBC Scotland's flagship political programme. The half-hour programme aired from 10.30pm Monday to Thursday, opposite STV's Scotland Tonight, with Newsnight being broadcast in Scotland at 11pm.

== History ==
Scotland 2014 was announced in February 2014, part of a major shake-up in BBC Scotland News and current affairs programme in the run up to the 2014 Scottish independence referendum. It was initially scheduled to run until October of that year. The BBC stated the series "will demonstrate how Scotland impacts on national and global events and how national and global events impact on Scotland." Presenter Sarah Smith relocated to Scotland from London.

In mid-2016, it was thought that the average audience was around 35,000 viewers.

On 21 June 2016, the BBC announced that the show was being discontinued. After its summer break, the series returned on 22 August 2016 albeit only being broadcast three nights a week.

In January 2017, the BBC announced its replacement called "Timeline" broadcasting once a week.

== See also ==
- BBC Scotland
- BBC News
