= Timeline of non-flagship BBC television channels =

This is a timeline of the history of non-flagship BBC television channels, i.e., BBC channels that have initially appeared on cable or satellite or digital television. The list excludes events from BBC One and BBC Two, unless they also relate to one of the other channels.

== 1990s ==
=== 1996 ===
- 9 May – The BBC announces its plans for digital television. They include a free-to-air news channel, widescreen versions of BBC1 and BBC2, "side channels" which will broadcast extra programmes related to what is on the main channels and a series of paid-for channels featuring programming from the BBC archives.
- The BBC holds talks with Flextech and BSkyB about a partnership to launch the paid-for channels. The BBC later decides not to pursue any partnership with BSkyB.

=== 1997 ===
- 4 March – The BBC and Flextech agree on a deal to provide several BBC-branded channels – BBC Showcase, for entertainment; BBC Horizon, for documentaries; BBC Style, for lifestyle; BBC Learning, for schools, and BBC Arena, for the arts – plus three other channels: BBC Catch-Up, for repeats of popular programmes within days of their original transmission, a dedicated BBC Sport channel and a TV version of Radio 1.
- 9 October – The Department of Culture, Media and Sport gives the BBC permission to offer its forthcoming 24-hour news channel free to cable operators, thus breaking a monopoly that had previously been held by Sky News.
- 1 November – Three of the proposed BBC/Flextech channels, UK Horizons, UK Style and UK Arena launch, but they use the ‘UK’ prefix because Flextech wanted these channels to carry adverts whereas the BBC did not. BBC Showcase/Catch-Up and BBC Learning are removed from the venture and launched in 1998 and 1999 as BBC Choice and BBC Knowledge respectively. The proposed TV version of Radio 1 eventually launches as a music and comedy channel called UK Play but with no connection to Radio 1 and plans for the sports channel come to nothing.
- 9 November – At 6pm, BBC News 24 is launched. It is the BBC's first new UK channel since BBC Two in 1964. It is only available full time via cable with all other viewers able to see the channel overnight on BBC One.

=== 1998 ===
- 10 June – The BBC switches on its digital signal, doing so to coincide with the start of the 1998 FIFA World Cup. The technology is showcased at a number of public venues over the summer, ahead of the launch of the BBC's first digital television channel, BBC Choice, in the Autumn.
- 23 September
  - BBC Choice, the UK's first digital-only TV station, launches at 12pm. However, viewers can only watch the launch online due to digital receivers not being on sale to the general public yet.
  - Following its purchase of the cable-only Parliamentary Channel, the BBC launches BBC Parliament on digital satellite and analogue cable with an audio feed of the channel on DAB.
- 15 November – The public launch of digital terrestrial TV in the UK takes place. Consequently, BBC Choice is now viewable by the general public via their television sets if they have digital equipment.

=== 1999 ===
- 1 June – The educational channel BBC Knowledge launches at 5pm.
- 29 September – The European Commission rejects a complaint from BSkyB that the licence fee funding of BBC News 24 is illegal under EU law because it amounts to state funding.
- 25 October – Relaunch of BBC News 24 with a new set design.
- 29 November – From that day, children's programming is broadcast all day on BBC Choice. Branded CBBC on Choice, children's programming is broadcast on the channel every day from 6am until 7pm.

== 2000s ==
=== 2000 ===
- June – BBC Choice and BBC Knowledge are reformatted to focus on more specific audiences. Knowledge adopts a broader documentary and culture mix and Choice focusing on developing a stronger relationship with the young adult audience, an audience the BBC had historically had difficulty in reaching. Many of its original programmes, such as Backstage, were replaced with shows aimed at younger people, with most of the early part of the schedules being made up of fifteen-minute programmes under the banner of "Refreshing TV" or "Micro TV". Entertainment news magazine Liquid News, presented by Christopher Price, evolved out of News 24's Zero 30 and became the channel's flagship show.
- 6 August – It is reported that the BBC is considering a reorganisation of their digital channels to replace BBC Choice and BBC Knowledge with BBC Three and BBC Four.
- 2 October – Rather than continuing to broadcast its own breakfast news programme, BBC News 24 begins to simulcast BBC’s One’s breakfast programme which on this day is revamped and relaunched as Breakfast.
- 14 November – BBC Parliament's audio feed on DAB is closed down.

=== 2001 ===
- BBC Choice's national late night outputs are abandoned as BBC Choice Northern Ireland closes on 30 March.
- 16 July – A one-minute news summary called 60 Seconds launches on BBC Choice.
- October – BBC Choice is further tilted towards youth programming, showcasing the kind of content that will be shown on BBC Three.

=== 2002 ===
- 11 February – Two new BBC children's channels, CBeebies (aimed at children under 6) and CBBC (aimed at children aged 6–12) launch.
- 2 March – BBC Knowledge ceases transmission in the early hours of the morning (the first BBC channel to permanently close) with BBC Four launching to replace it at 7pm. The opening night is simulcast on BBC Two.
- 10 April – BBC Four airs Ian Curteis's The Falklands Play, in which Patricia Hodge plays the role of Margaret Thatcher during the Falklands War. The play was originally written in 1986, but shelved by the BBC because of an upcoming General Election and the play's perceived pro-Thatcher stance. The play has separate radio and television versions (airing on Radio 4 on 6 April), and gives BBC Four an audience of 174,000, the channel's highest audience since its launch.
- 3 June – BBC Parliament broadcasts archived programming for the first time when it reruns the BBC's coverage of the Queen's Coronation as part of the Golden Jubilee Weekend.
- 7 September – Following the success of its rerun of the BBC's coverage of the Queen's Coronation, BBC Parliament replays coverage of archive BBC General Election coverage for the first time. The first to be shown is the coverage of the results of the 1979 General Election and the following day, the channel shows the results programme of the 1997 General Election. These reruns subsequently became a mainstay of the channel for many years thereafter and were usually shown to coincide with the anniversaries of their original transmissions.
- September – BBC Three is finally given the go-ahead after the BBC submitted a revised proposal for the new channel. It raised the target age range to 25–34 and increased the amount of factual, news and arts programming. It had previously been refused over worries that it would be too similar to rival channels such as E4, ITV2 and Sky 1.
- 6 October – BBC Choice's Liquid News is relaunched with a new studio and graphics and a new presenting team consisting of Claudia Winkleman and Colin Paterson.
- 30 October – BBC Parliament launches on digital terrestrial television, having previously only been available as an audio-only service. However, capacity limitations mean that the picture is squeezed into just one quarter of the screen.

=== 2003 ===
- 8 February – After more than four years on the air, BBC Choice closes. Its final night is given over to previews of its replacement, BBC Three.
- 9 February – After a long delay, BBC Three launches. The opening night is simulcast on BBC Two.
- 27 November – The BBC unveils a revamped version of its news channel in an attempt to make it appear more dynamic to viewers. Changes include a new studio set and redesigned branding and graphics.
- 8 December – BBC News 24 is relaunched with a new set and titles, as well as a new Breaking News sting. Networked news on BBC One and Two remains with the same titles though the set was redesigned in a similar style to that of the new News 24. The relaunch had been scheduled for the previous Monday (1 December), but was delayed due to a power failure the week before which had disrupted work on the new set.

=== 2004 ===
- 15 January – BBC Four begins a six-part adaptation of the Alan Clark Diaries, starring John Hurt and Jenny Agutter. The series concludes on 17 February and is later repeated on BBC Two.
- 1 April – BBC Three's entertainment news programme Liquid News ends.
- 14 May – BBC Four Controller Roly Keating is appointed to succeed Jane Root as Controller of BBC Two.

=== 2005 ===
- 27 January – Holocaust Memorial Day and the 60th anniversary of the liberation of Auschwitz concentration camp are observed in the UK. BBC Two and BBC News 24 air Auschwitz Remembered, a special news programme providing coverage of memorial events.
- 2 April – Digital channel BBC Four broadcasts a live remake of the famous 1953 science-fiction drama The Quatermass Experiment. The production is the first live drama broadcast by the BBC for over twenty years and draws BBC Four's second highest audience to date with an average of 482,000 viewers.
- 4 April – BBC Four airs Speak No Evil – The Story of the Broadcast Ban, a documentary recalling the 1988 broadcasting restrictions imposed by the Government of Margaret Thatcher on organisations in Northern Ireland believed to support terrorism.
- 30 September – CBBC's identity is relaunched with its second new look since the launch of the CBBC Channel, known as the Green Gumdrop.
- 2 December – BBC Three's weeknight news bulletin The 7 O'Clock News is broadcast for the final time. It is axed following a report which a report into the BBC's digital output claimed that the show "achieves nothing and attracts tiny audiences".

=== 2006 ===
- 13 November – BBC Parliament broadcasts in full screen format for the first time on the Freeview service, having previously only been available in quarter screen format. The BBC eventually found the bandwidth to make the channel full-screen after receiving "thousands of angry and perplexed e-mails and letters", not to mention questions asked by MPs in the Houses of Parliament itself.

=== 2007 ===
- 22 January – BBC News 24 is rebranded with new titles and on-screen graphics.
- 3 September – CBBC identity relaunched with its third new look since the launch of the CBBC channel with a stylised ident.

=== 2008 ===
- 24 March – BBC Four broadcasts a revived, special two-hour-long episode of the 1960s satire The Frost Report.
- 21 April – As part of a major rebranding of BBC News, BBC News 24 becomes the BBC News Channel.
- 19 September – BBC Alba, a Scottish Gaelic language digital television channel, is launched through a partnership between the BBC and MG Alba.
- 1 October – BBC Four Controller Janice Hadlow is appointed Controller of BBC Two, replacing outgoing incumbent Roly Keating from November.

== 2010s ==
=== 2010 ===
- 15 February – Fiona Armstrong and Julia Somerville join the BBC News Channel as regular presenters. They will later be joined by Zeinab Badawi and Carole Walker as the BBC seeks to fight accusations that it has an ageist policy.
- 23 June – Following the previous day's emergency budget statement, David Cameron and Nick Clegg are questioned by a live audience on its potential impact. The programme Britain's Economy: Cameron and Clegg Face the Audience is presented by Nick Robinson and aired on the BBC News Channel and BBC Two.
- 15 October – BBC Three Controller Danny Cohen is named as the new Controller of BBC One, replacing Jay Hunt.
- 20 October – The Chancellor of the Exchequer, George Osborne, announces that part of the responsibility for funding the Welsh language channel S4C is to be transferred to the BBC.

=== 2011 ===
- 7 April – Top of the Pops returns to television in its former Thursday evening slot as BBC Four begins airing old episodes from 1976, the point at which the broadcaster's full archive of shows begins.

=== 2012 ===
- 27 July–12 August – BBC Three's hours are temporarily extended so that it can provide alternative live, all-day coverage of the 2012 Olympic Games. Also, BBC Parliament is removed from Freeview for the duration of the Games to provide an additional red button feed for digital terrestrial viewers.
- 4 October – BBC Four pulls two planned repeats of Top of the Pops from its schedule following recent allegations made against Jimmy Savile. The shows which featured Savile as presenter, are part of the channel's weekly rerun of archive editions which have been airing since last year.
- 21 December – After 27 years, CBBC airs on BBC One for the last time. All of the children's programmes would become exclusive to their dedicated channels, CBBC and CBeebies.

=== 2013 ===
- 4 January – CBBC and CBeebies both air on BBC Two for the last time.
- 9 January – BBC Four confirms that its reruns of Top of the Pops will continue with episodes from 1978, but editions featuring Jimmy Savile will not be aired.
- 26 March – The BBC HD channel closes, being replaced by BBC Two HD.
- 1 April – Responsibility for the funding of S4C begins to transfer to the BBC.
- 8 May – BBC Two Controller Janice Hadlow takes temporary control of BBC Four following the departure of Richard Klein to become head of TIV factual programming.
- 7 June – Queen Elizabeth II opens the BBC's rebuilt Broadcasting House, creating a memorable television moment when she appears behind the BBC News channel's on air newsreaders.
- 29 October – The BBC announces that The Sky at Night will be shown exclusively on BBC Four from 2014, ending a 54-year run on the Corporation's flagship channel.
- 10 December – The BBC launches five new high-definition simulcasts of BBC News, BBC Three, BBC Four, CBBC and CBeebies.

=== 2014 ===
- 5 February – Janice Hadlow will step down as joint Controller of BBC Two and BBC Four to take up a new role in charge of "special projects and seasons" at the BBC.
- 5 March – A celebrity campaign is launched to save BBC Three amid reports that the channel will become an online only channel to cut costs.
- 6 March – BBC Director-General Tony Hall confirms BBC Three will close in Autumn 2015, and shift its content online. Subject to the approval of the BBC Trust, the plans will also allow an extra £30m to be spent on drama for BBC One and a BBC One +1 service.
- 11 April – Kim Shillinglaw is named Controller of BBC Two and BBC Four, replacing Janice Hadlow.
- 2 June – Sam Bickley is appointed as acting editor of BBC Three, and will take up the position when Zai Bennett relinquishes the role to join Sky Atlantic in July.
- 24 July–3 August – BBC Three's hours are temporarily extended so that it can provide alternative live, all-day coverage of the 2014 Commonwealth Games.
- 5 December – The BBC Trust announces plans for a full public consultation into its proposed closure of BBC Three.
- 10 December – Further details of plans to move BBC Three online are unveiled, where the channel will broadcast 24 hours a day and have an emphasis on comedy and long form content. Subject to the approval of the BBC Trust, a BBC One + 1 service will occupy the channel space vacated by BBC Three, while CBBC's daily airtime will be extended by two hours.

=== 2015 ===
- 20 January – In an attempt to save BBC Three from closure, the Avalon Group and Hat Trick Productions approach the BBC Trust with an offer to buy the channel.
- late January – Jeremy Paxman presents Churchill: The Nation's Farewell, an hour-long documentary aired to coincide with the 50th anniversary of the State funeral of Winston Churchill. BBC Parliament also airs the full television coverage of the funeral in real time on 30 January with an by Nicholas Soames, Churchill's grandson, who was in attendance that day.
- 17 February – Campaigners against BBC plans to close BBC Three and move it online deliver a petition to the BBC Trust.
- 23 April – Plans to move BBC Three online are postponed until 2016 while the BBC waits for approval from the BBC Trust.
- 1 June – Outside Source and Business Live make their debuts on the BBC News Channel after being launched on BBC World News in February 2014 and March 2015 respectively.
- 6 June – World News Today is included in the weekend schedule of the BBC News Channel, airing at 9pm.
- 8 June – Daniel Radcliffe and Lena Headey are among 750 signatories from the world of film and television to put their name to a petition urging the BBC Trust to reverse its decision to turn BBC Three into an online only service.
- 25 June – After the Women's World Cup proves popular with viewers, and having increased BBC Three's viewership, the BBC switches coverage of England's 27 June quarter final match against Canada to BBC One.
- 30 June – The BBC Trust provisionally approves plans to move BBC Three online from January 2016. At the same time the Trust also recommends rejecting plans for a BBC One timeshift channel because it "fails the public value test and should be rejected". The announcement of BBC Three's potential fate prompts Jimmy Mulville and Jon Thoday—who offered £100m to save the channel—to urge John Whittingdale to review the decision and link it with negotiations for the Corporation's charter renewal. Mulville and Thoday also threaten to invoke a judicial review if BBC Three's closure is confirmed.
- 4 July – BBC Three airs the third place play-off of the women's World Cup between England and Germany.
- 9 September – The CBBC Channel airs a 60-minute programme celebrating thirty years of The Broom Cupboard, the studio from which CBBC continuity programming was broadcast. The programme features past CBBC presenters, including Andi Peters, Phillip Schofield, Zoë Ball and Edd the Duck.
- 15 September – BBC Director-General Tony Hall tells the Culture, Media and Sport Select Committee that there are no plans to close CBBC or CBeebies.
- 26 November – The BBC Trust approves proposals to close BBC Three, making it an online service from February 2016, but on the proviso that its programmes are aired on BBC One and BBC Two. Plans are also approved to extend the broadcasting hours of the CBBC channel from 7pm to 9pm, with the Trust suggesting parents unhappy with the decision should use the off button.

=== 2016 ===
- 4 January – The BBC confirms 16 February as the date on which BBC Three will begin its transition to an online only channel. A new logo for the channel is introduced.
- 19 January – BBC One controller Charlotte Moore is appointed to the newly created role of controller of BBC TV channels and iPlayer, while Kim Shillinglaw, current controller of BBC Two and BBC Four is to leave the BBC and her position abolished.
- 15 February – BBC Three's final night on air sees it repeating episodes of some of its most popular series, including The Mighty Boosh and Family Guy. The final programme, aired in the early hours of 16 February, is a repeat of an episode of Gavin & Stacey. BBC Three becomes an online channel from 16 February.
- 7 June – S4C resumes high definition broadcasting, having been forced to close its previous HD service in 2012 due to budget cuts.
- 6–21 August – BBC Four's hours are temporarily extended so that it can provide alternative live coverage of the 2016 Olympic Games.
- 22 August – Research conducted by commercial TV marketing body Thinkbox suggests that the BBC experienced a 20% drop in younger viewers in the months following the closure of BBC Three, while channels such as ITV2 and E4 have benefited in terms of viewers from BBC Three's disappearance from the airwaves.
- 7 September – It is agreed that the BBC will provide £74.5m a year funding to S4C from the licence fee until 2022.

=== 2017 ===
- 10 February – BBC Four acquires its first Canadian drama, the six part Cardinal, a detective series based on Giles Blunt's 2002 novel Forty Words for Sorrow set in the small Canadian wilderness town of Algonquin Bay. The series will air later in the year.
- 4 March – The BBC launches an investigation after a group of five intruders gained access to a studio at Broadcasting House during a live broadcast of the BBC News channel the previous evening. The individuals were not seen on air and left of their own accord.

=== 2018 ===
- 23 February – BBC Four broadcasts a special one-off live edition of The Old Grey Whistle Test to mark thirty years since the original series came to an end. The three-hour programme is presented by Bob Harris.
- 29 March – The UK Government announces that it will continue providing £6.72m of funding for S4C until 2020, with the aim of S4C being funded wholly from the licence fee from 2022. This will see S4C's funding being decided as part of the licence fee settlement, for 10 year periods.
- 12 July – The BBC announces cut-backs to BBC Parliament. The channel will now close down in the weeks when no UK parliamentary bodies are in session and all programmes made especially for the channel will end.
- 10 October – The BBC announces it has reversed planned cuts to the output of BBC Parliament, but warns of possible future cuts to other services in order to save £500m before 2021–22.
- 25 October – Research conducted by TV regulator Ofcom reveals that only 8% of younger viewers watch BBC Three content each week.
- 22 November – BBC Four airs a one-off 90-minute special live and interactive edition of Tomorrow's World. The programme is presented by two of the original presenters, Maggie Philbin and Howard Stableford, as well as Dr. Hannah Fry.

=== 2019 ===
- 17 February – BBC Two Scotland closes in preparation for the launch of the BBC Scotland channel. Viewers in Scotland can still watch the national version of BBC Two, with regional content aired by BBC Two Scotland being transferred to the new channel.
- 19 February – Virgin Media removes the standard definition versions of the non-flagship BBC television channels except BBC Parliament due to that channel currently not broadcasting in high definition.
- 24 February – A new BBC Scotland channel launches and replaces BBC Two Scotland.
- 25 February – BBC Scotland launches its weekday flagship news programme The Nine.
- 27 February – Launch of Debate Night, BBC Scotland's weekly political debate show.
- 3 May – BBC Four airs a one-off feature length edition of the 1960s television programme Jazz 625 live from the Cheltenham Jazz Festival. The programme airs in black-and-white, making it the first live black-and-white television broadcast since the 1970s.

== 2020s ==
=== 2020 ===
- 15 July – The BBC announces that it will “no longer commission most of the other bespoke programmes we currently make for BBC Parliament, although we will continue to draw on our archive to broadcast our popular historical election coverage.” This is part of plans the BBC set out at the start of the year to modernise BBC News against the backdrop of having to find £80 million of savings.

=== 2021 ===
- 2 March – The BBC confirms that BBC Three will be relaunched as a television channel in January 2022, six years after going online. Since 2016, the service has been responsible for creating dramas such as Fleabag and Killing Eve, something that has prompted calls for its return.
- 26 July–31 August – BBC Parliament simulcasts the BBC News Channel for the first time during a parliamentary recess. Previously the channel had broadcast highlights from the previous Parliamentary term during Parliamentary recesses.
- 31 August – From this day, BBC Parliament's programming is restricted to nothing other than live and recorded coverage from Westminster and the devolved chambers. This is being seen as part of a range of cutbacks to the channel, such as the end of coverage of party conferences as well as the ending of The Day in Parliament and The Week in Parliament. Coverage of the House of Lords and Select committees is also significantly reduced. and the Sunday broadcasts of national political shows, C-SPAN and the repeat of Question Time also ended.

=== 2022 ===
- 1 February – BBC Three relaunches as a television channel six years after the original channel was closed down in favour of BBC Three becoming an online service.
- 12 April – Virgin Media removes the standard definition version of BBC Parliament.
- 26 May – BBC Director-General Tim Davie announces plans to make annual savings of £500m that will see the content of BBC Four and the CBBC channel moving to an online only service, while BBC Radio 4 Extra will also go online. However, they will continue to be available through television platforms for at least the next three years. The BBC News Channel and BBC World News will also merge to become one news service.
- 14 July – The BBC sets out plans for a new global news channel titled BBC News. It will replace its two existing news services for the UK and overseas. It is scheduled to launch in April 2023.

=== 2023 ===
- 7 January – Ahead of the merger in April, the BBC News Channel stops producing its weekend opt-out from BBC World News between 13:00-19:00 and network news bulletins, apart from Breakfast and Sunday with Laura Kuenssberg, stop being simulcast on the channel.
- 6 March – World Business Report begins to be shown on the BBC News Channel as part of extended programme sharing between the channel and BBC World News.
- 3 April – The BBC News Channel closes as a stand-alone channel. It merges with BBC World News to form a single worldwide news channel called BBC News with programmes based on BBC World News output although the ability to break away from international programming for a major UK news story is to be retained. The weekday simulcasts of the BBC One news bulletins and BBC Breakfast continue to be shown on the channel and a simulcast of Newsnight is launched.
- 17 April – Nicky Campbell's BBC Radio 5 Live weekday morning show starts to be simulcast on BBC News.
- 22 May – The first new global shows to launch since the UK and global channels were merged begin. Running back-to-back on weekdays between 12noon and 8pm, they are BBC News Now, Verified Live and The Daily Global.

=== 2024 ===
- 6 August – Ofcom approves planned changes to the BBC Scotland television channel that will see cutbacks to its news, with its hour-long 9pm weekday programme The Nine replaced by a 30 minute programme at 7pm.
- 9 December – BBC Scotland announces the launch of two new news programmes in early 2025: Reporting Scotland: News at Seven, a weeknight news bulletin presented by Laura Maciver and Amy Irons on the BBC Scotland channel from 6 January, and the Scotcast podcast with Martin Geissler launching on 13 January.

=== 2026 ===
- 15 October – The BBC News channel is made available to stream live on YouTube in the United Kingdom and United States.
- 20 October – It is announced that BBC Three and the BBC Scotland TV channel are to close as linear services in Spring 2027, and become online services as the BBC makes £500m of savings.

== See also ==
- Timeline of BBC One
- Timeline of BBC Two
- Timeline of the BBC Television Service
