= Timeline of BBC One =

This is a timeline of the history of BBC One.

== 1960s ==
=== 1964 ===
- 20 April – Due to the launch of BBC2, the existing BBC TV channel is renamed BBC1.
- 28 September – In the Midlands, BBC1 airs the first edition of its local news programme, Midlands Today.
- 28 October – The Wednesday Play premieres.
- 15 December – Peter Watkins' docudrama Culloden is shown.

=== 1965 ===
- 7 April – BBC1 airs Three Clear Sundays, a Wednesday Play about the events leading to a man's conviction for capital murder.
- 18 June – The last edition of Tonight is broadcast.
- 7 July – The long-running science and technology programme Tomorrow's World makes its debut.
- 6 August – The War Game, a drama-documentary by director Peter Watkins, depicting the events of a supposedly futuristic nuclear attack on the United Kingdom, is pulled from its planned transmission in The Wednesday Play anthology strand. The BBC was pressured into this move by the British government, which did not want much of the play's content to become public. It was eventually released to cinemas, and won the 1966 Academy Award for Documentary Feature. The BBC finally aired the play in 1985.
- 4 October
  - United! makes its debut.
  - 24 Hours launches.
- 18 October – The Magic Roundabout makes its debut. It continues until 1977.
- 13 December – Jackanory makes its debut. It ran until 1996 and was later revived in 2006.

=== 1966 ===
- 3 January – Camberwick Green is the first programme on BBC1 to be shot in colour and the first programme to feature the copyright year in the end credits; BBC1 would not broadcast in colour until almost four years later and regular programmes also wouldn't show the copyright year in the end credits until six years later.
- 6 June – The sitcom Till Death Us Do Part begins its first series run.
- 16 November – The play Cathy Come Home is presented in The Wednesday Play anthology strand.

=== 1967 ===
- 3 January – Trumpton is the second programme on BBC1 to be shot in colour and feature the copyright year in the end credits five years before regular programmes would; only BBC2 became the first channel to broadcast colour TV. BBC1 however still wouldn't broadcast colour until almost three years later.
- 26 December – The Beatles' Magical Mystery Tour airs in the UK.

=== 1968 ===
- 12 February – The Herbs, the first programme in colour produced by another company other than Gordon Murray Puppets Ltd. debuts.
- 1 April – Reporting Scotland launches on BBC1 Scotland, replacing A Quick Look Round.
- 9 July – American time-travel series The Time Tunnel debuts.
- 31 July – The sitcom Dad's Army begins a nine-year run.
- 9 September – Hector's House debuts.

=== 1969 ===
- 9 September – The first edition of teatime news magazine Nationwide is broadcast. Initially broadcast twice a week (Tuesday and Thursday), it airs every weekday from 1972.
- 6 October – Chigley is the third and final programme to be shot in colour on BBC1 before regular colour broadcasting and also happens to be the first programme to feature the copyright year in Roman numerals in the end credits nearly seven years ahead of regular programming.
- 15 November – Regular colour broadcasting is introduced to BBC1, coinciding with the launch of the new NODD Mirrored Globe ident.

== 1970s ==
=== 1970 ===
- 15 February – BBC1 airs the Ken Russell film Dance of the Seven Veils as part of its Omnibus strand. The film, about German composer Richard Strauss, attracts complaints because of its sex scenes, and controversy by depicting Strauss as a Nazi sympathiser. Strauss's family subsequently withdraw their permission for the use of his music, meaning the film cannot be shown again until the copyright on his work has expired. It is not until 2020 that the film is given a second airing, at that year's Keswick Film Festival.
- 14 September – The Nine O'Clock News is first broadcast on BBC1. The programme aired until 13 October 2000 when the station's main evening bulletin was switched to 10pm.
- 25 December – Pluto's Christmas Tree is broadcast on BBC1, the first complete Mickey Mouse cartoon to be shown on British television in colour.

=== 1971 ===
- 10 April – The Two Ronnies makes its debut on BBC1.
- 7 June – Children's magazine show Blue Peter buries a time capsule in the grounds of BBC Television Centre, due to be opened on the first episode of the year 2000.
- 2 October – Debut on BBC1 of The Generation Game, presented by Bruce Forsyth, and from 1978, Larry Grayson.

=== 1972 ===
- 27 March – For the first time, BBC1 broadcasts children's programmes on weekday mornings during the school holidays. The block, which runs for just over one hour, ends at 11am, which is the start time for Play School on BBC2.
- 24 April – The first edition of Newsround is broadcast.
- 2 October – Following a recent law change, BBC1 and ITV are allowed to begin broadcasting a full afternoon schedule with both broadcasters now broadcasting non-stop from lunchtime. BBC1's afternoon schedule launches with the first edition of a new lunchtime magazine programme Pebble Mill at One.
- 30 December – BBC1 airs part one of "The Three Doctors", a four-part serial of the science-fiction programme Doctor Who created to celebrate its tenth anniversary (which would occur on 23 November of the following year).

=== 1973 ===
- 4 January – The British long-running comedy series Last of the Summer Wine starts as a 30-minute pilot on BBC1's Comedy Playhouse show. The first series run starts on 12 November and the programme runs for 37 years until August 2010.
- 5 February – Elisabeth Beresford's well known popular children's characters The Wombles have spawned into a stop motion animated television series narrated by Bernard Cribbins and composed by Mike Batt on BBC1.
- 15 February – The first episode of Some Mothers Do 'Ave 'Em airs on BBC1.
- 25 March – The pilot episode of Open All Hours airs as part of Ronnie Barker's series Seven of One on BBC1.
- 1 April – Prisoner and Escort, the pilot episode of Porridge, airs as part of Seven of One.
- 25 May – The first episode of the magazine-style series That's Life! airs. Hosted by Esther Rantzen.
- 31 October – The sixth series of television sitcom Dad's Army opens with the episode "The Deadly Attachment" containing the "Don't tell him, Pike!" exchange which will become rated as one of the top three greatest comedy moments of British television.
- 12 November – First series run of Last of the Summer Wine starts on BBC1.

=== 1974 ===
- 7 January – A two-minute weekday mid-afternoon regional news summary is broadcast on BBC1 for the first time. It is transmitted immediately before the start of the afternoon's children's programmes.
- 23 September – The BBC teletext service Ceefax goes live with 30 pages of information.
- 16 October – The Welsh language soap Pobol y Cwm makes its debut on BBC Wales.
- 28 December – The BBC1 Mirrored Globe ident changes to a blue and yellow colour scheme. The legend BBC1 was rendered in white, using a heavy weight of the Futura typeface.

=== 1975 ===
- 6 January – Due to cutbacks at the BBC, BBC1 stops broadcasting programmes on weekday early afternoons. Consequently, apart from schools programmes and live sport, the channel now shows a trade test transmission between 2pm and the start of children's programmes.
- 4 April – The Good Life makes its debut on BBC1.
- 31 May – Jim'll Fix It makes its debut on BBC1.
- 15 July – BBC1 airs This is Ceefax in which Angela Rippon tells the story of this new form of broadcasting and looks at some of its uses.

=== 1976 ===
- 4 February – Early morning programming from the Open University begins on BBC1, with Electrons in motion airing at 7:05am.
- 6 April – Original scheduled airdate of Dennis Potter's Play for Today Brimstone and Treacle. The film is pulled from transmission on BBC1 due to controversy over its content, including the rape of a woman by the devil. It is eventually aired on BBC1 in 1987, after having been made into a film starring Sting in 1982.
- 2 October – The first edition of Saturday morning children's magazine show Multi-Coloured Swap Shop is broadcast. It runs throughout the morning on BBC1.

=== 1977 ===
- Unknown – Scum, an entry in BBC1's Play for Today anthology strand, is pulled from transmission due to controversy over its depiction of life in a Young Offenders' Institution (at this time known in the United Kingdom as a borstal). Two years later the director Alan Clarke makes a film version with most of the same cast, and the original play itself is eventually aired in 1991.

=== 1978 ===
- 7 March–11 April – Dennis Potter's groundbreaking drama serial Pennies From Heaven airs on BBC1.
- 28–29 May – British television debut of Francis Ford Coppola's The Godfather, airing as a two-part presentation over two consecutive nights on BBC1.
- 21–22 December – BBC1 and BBC2 are forced off the air due to industrial action at the BBC by the ABS union which starts on Thursday 21 December. On Friday 22 December the radio unions join their BBC Television counterparts, forcing the BBC to merge their four national radio networks into one national radio station, the BBC All Network Radio Service, from 4pm that afternoon. The strike is settled shortly before 10pm on 22 December, with the unions and BBC management reaching an agreement at the British government's industrial disputes arbitration service ACAS. BBC1 resumes broadcast at 3pm on Saturday 23 December, with BBC2 resuming at 1pm the same afternoon. Threat of disruption to the BBC's festive television schedules is averted. BBC Radio networks resume normal schedules on the morning of Saturday 23 December.
- 25 December – BBC1 airs the British television premiere of The Sound of Music.

=== 1979 ===
- 3–4 May – BBC1 broadcasts coverage of the 1979 General Election.
- 2 September – Subtitling of television programmes on Ceefax begins.
- 25 September – Robin Day presents the first edition of the long-running political debate programme Question Time on BBC1 The programme continues to air to the present day.
- 11 November – The last episode of the first series of the sitcom To the Manor Born is broadcast on BBC1. It is watched by 23.95 million viewers, the all-time highest figure for a recorded programme in the UK.

== 1980s ==
=== 1980 ===
- 1 January – The holiday camp sitcom Hi-de-Hi! makes its debut on BBC1.
- March – The very first in-vision Ceefax transmissions are broadcast. These consist of 30 minute transmissions, which BBC1 broadcasts on weekday mornings between 8:30am and 9am.
- 8 September – Watchdog is launched as a weekly slot on BBC1's news magazine programme Nationwide.
- 19 September – Regional peak time continuity on BBC1 ends and with it the weeknight closedown regional news bulletin.
- 1 October – BBC1's lunchtime children's programme is labelled See Saw for the first time.
- 21 November
  - The first annual Children in Need charity appeal is organised by the BBC.
  - 21.5 million viewers tune in to watch the 1980–81 season premier of Dallas, which answers the question of Who shot J.R.?. At the time the audience figures are a record for a soap in Britain.
- 9 December – The single drama The Flipside of Dominick Hide is first broadcast as part of the Play for Today series on BBC1.

=== 1981 ===
- 5 January – Debut of the BBC1 soap Triangle, a twice-weekly series set aboard a North Sea ferry, and filmed on location using outside broadcast cameras. The website TVARK describes the programme as being chiefly remembered as "some of the most mockable British television ever produced" owing to its clichéd storylines and stilted dialogue. It is axed after three series.
- 10 February – The Alan Rogers animated series Pigeon Street begins on BBC1. The series ran until December before repeats on BBC1 and BBC2 throughout the 1980s and 1990s.
- 29 March – BBC1 airs highlights of the first London Marathon under the International Athletics strand. Live coverage of the event begins the following year.
- 29 July – BBC1 televises the marriage of Charles, Prince of Wales and Lady Diana Spencer takes place at St Paul's Cathedral. More than 30,000,000 viewers watch the wedding on television – the second highest television audience of all time in Britain.
- 5 September – The BBC1 Mirror globe changes colour from yellow on blue to green on blue, also now using the twin-striped BBC1 legend, having been seen on caption cards and slides since 1975.
- 7 September – News After Noon is launched as a 30-minute lunchtime news programme, replacing the much shorter Midday News.
- 8 September – BBC1 airs the first episode of the popular comedy series Only Fools and Horses starring David Jason and Nicholas Lyndhurst.
- 16 September – Debut of a children's television series about a rural postman with a black and white cat written and created by John Cunliffe and voiced and narrated by Ken Barrie, And Edited By Ivor Wood the same director as most Filmfair programmes, Postman Pat on BBC1 the first Woodland Animations Ltd. produced programme. Episode 8 introduced a more authentic look to the Royal Mail and Post Office Ltd logos.
- December – BBC1 and the BBC's Open University broadcasts begin using computer generated clocks.

=== 1982 ===
- 3 January – The first run of The Generation Game ends.
- 27 March – The final edition of Saturday morning children's magazine show Multi-Coloured Swap Shop is broadcast.
- 1 May – British television debut of the American soap opera Dynasty.
- 4 May – The long-running chat show Wogan makes its debut on BBC1, presented by Terry Wogan. It would be shown thrice weekly from 1985 and would continue until July 1992.
- 20 June – The BBC relaunches its Sunday morning programme for the Asian community, and is now called Asian Magazine.
- August – Programmes in Welsh are broadcast for the final time on BBC1 in England.
- 2 October – The first edition of Multi-Coloured Swap Shop’s Saturday morning replacement show Saturday Superstore is broadcast on BBC1. It adopts a similar format to its predecessor.
- 3–9 October – As part of its coverage of the 1982 Commonwealth Games, BBC1 broadcasts a two-hour breakfast programme Breakfast with Brisbane.
- 2 December – 10.2 million viewers saw a classic comedy scene from the Only Fools and Horses episode A Touch of Glass in which the Trotters accidentally smash a priceless chandelier.

=== 1983 ===
- January – BBC1 starts broadcasting a full afternoon service, consisting of regional programmes, repeats and old feature films.
- 17 January – At 6:30am, Britain's first-ever breakfast television show, Breakfast Time, launches on BBC1.
- late February/early March – The BBC begins broadcasting a 30-minute Ceefax slot prior to the start of Breakfast Time. It is called Ceefax AM and is first mentioned in the Radio Times on 21 March.
- 17 February – Woodland Animations Ltd. introduces a new stop-motion animated series, Gran, on BBC1, following the success of Postman Pat, the same day as the final episode of the sitcom Tom, Dick and Harriet airs on ITV.
- 3 May – From that day, Ceefax pages are broadcast during all BBC1 daytime downtime.
- 5 May – Top of the Pops celebrates its 1000th edition. The programme is also broadcast on BBC Radio 1 to allow viewers to listen to the programme in stereo.
- 15 June – BBC1 airs the first episode of The Black Adder, the first in the successful Blackadder series of sitcoms.
- 5 August – After 14 years on air, the final edition of Nationwide is broadcast.
- 7–14 August – BBC1 airs full live coverage of the first World Athletics Championships. Apart from in 2011, the BBC has shown the event ever since although more recently, the majority of the coverage has been on BBC2.
- 4 October – BBC1 airs the Welsh children's animated series SuperTed which was based on a series of stories written by Welsh writer, producer and animator Mike Young to help his son overcome his fear of the dark. It had been so popular it was spawned into merchandising and was broadcast in many countries worldwide.
- 24 October – Sixty Minutes launches on BBC1, replacing Nationwide but it ended less than a year later.
- 21 December – First airing on British television of The Fog, John Carpenter's 1980 horror film on BBC1.

=== 1984 ===
- 5 April – Industrial action by members of the Entertainment Trades' Alliance results on all of that day's BBC1 programmes being cancelled.
- 7 June – BBC1 airs the first edition of Crimewatch. The first case to be featured on the show is the murder of Colette Aram, which had occurred the previous year. A man is finally charged with the murder in 2009, and sentenced to life imprisonment in January 2010 after pleading guilty.
- 28 July–12 August – BBC Television airs the 1984 Summer Olympic Games. Almost all of the coverage is shown on BBC1 and the channel stays on air into the night to provide live coverage.
- 3 September – BBC1's teatime news hour is relaunched and now runs from 6pm until 7pm. A new 30-minute-long news programme the Six O'Clock News is launched and this is followed by a longer regional news magazine, which is expanded to 25 minutes.
- 5 October – The first programme in the trilogy to be produced by Maddocks Cartoon Productions, The Family-Ness, makes its debut on BBC1.
- 23 October – BBC News newsreader Michael Buerk gives a powerful commentary of the famine in Ethiopia which has already claimed thousands of lives and reportedly has the potential to kill as many as 7 million people. This report subsequently leads to the formation of the charity supergroup Band Aid and the No.1 single "Do They Know It's Christmas?" as well as the Live Aid concerts the following year.
- 18 November – The BBC launches its first Sunday lunchtime political interview show, called This Week, Next Week.
- 21 November – Debut of Alan Seymour's dramatisation of the John Masefield fantasy adventure novel The Box of Delights. The six part series concludes on Christmas Eve.
- 26 December – Joan Hickson makes her debut as Agatha Christie's Miss Marple in BBC1's eponymous television series, with the first part of a three-part adaptation of The Body in the Library. Part two airs on 27 December, and Part three on 28 December.

=== 1985 ===
- 3 January – The UK's last VHF 405-line television transmitters close down. Transmissions in England, Wales and Northern Ireland end on the 3rd, although a few relays continue to broadcast on 405-lines until the 6th. 405-line transmission in Scotland ends on the 4th.
- 7 January – The BBC ends its experiment with afternoon broadcasting and from this date afternoon Pages from Ceefax is shown on BBC1 between the end of lunchtime programmes and the start of children's programmes apart from when the party conferences and sporting events are being shown.
- 4 February – American detective drama Miami Vice makes its British television debut on BBC1, with the feature-length episode "Brother's Keeper".
- 18 February – BBC1 undergoes a major relaunch. At 5:35pm, the legendary mechanical "mirror globe" ident, in use in varying forms since 1969, is seen for the last time in regular rotation on national BBC1. Its replacement, the COW (Computer Originated World, a computer generated globe) makex its debut at 7pm to introduce the relaunch of Terry Wogan's eponymous talk show as a thrice-weekly live primetime programme.
- 19 February – Debut of the soap opera EastEnders, set in the East End of London.
- 19 March – BBC1 begins showing The Day the Universe Changed, a ten-part series in which science historian James Burke looks at how advances in science and technology have shaped western society over the last five centuries.
- 29 March – Play School is shown in the afternoon for the final time.
- 31 March – BBC1 begins airing a season of films directed by Francis Ford Coppola, beginning with the Vietnam War epic Apocalypse Now, a film inspired by the Joseph Conrad novella Heart of Darkness. This is the first showing of Apocalypse Now on British television.
- 1 April
  - Bertha, a new stop-motion animated series from Woodland Animations, the team behind Postman Pat, makes its debut on BBC1.
  - The final episode of the long-running sitcom Are You Being Served? airs on BBC1.
- 7 July – Debut on BBC1 of The Rock 'n' Roll Years, a series that looks at the music and events of a particular year, starting with 1956.
- 13 July – Live Aid pop concerts are held in Philadelphia and London and televised around the world. Over £50 million is raised for famine relief in Ethiopia. BBC1 shows the Philadelphia concert, the London concert had been shown on BBC2.
- 14 July – Watchdog launches as a stand-alone programme. having previously been a segment within teatime news magazine programmes Nationwide and Sixty Minutes.
- 30 August – The weekday lunchtime Financial Report, broadcast on BBC1 in London and the south east, is broadcast for the final time ahead of the launch of a lunchtime regional news bulletin for viewers in the BBC South East region.
- 1 September – Debut of the drama series Howards' Way on BBC1.
- 3 September – BBC1's EastEnders moves from 7pm to 7:30pm to avoid clashing with ITV's Emmerdale Farm, which airs in the 7pm timeslot on Tuesdays and Thursdays in many ITV regions.
- 8 September – BBC1 'closes down' (albeit since 1983 with broadcasts of Pages from Ceefax) on Sunday mornings for the final time as from the following year, repeats are shown during the adult educational Sunday morning slot's annual Summer break.
- 9 September – Children's BBC begins on BBC1.
- 14 November – A special edition of Tomorrow's World examines how effective the proposed Strategic Defense Initiative (Star Wars) might be at destroying any nuclear weapons launched at the United States.
- 6 December – BBC1 airs John Lennon: A Journey in the Life, an Everyman special marking the fifth anniversary of the murder of John Lennon. The programme includes archive footage of Lennon, dramatisations of parts of his life, and contributions from some of his friends.

=== 1986 ===
- 2 January – A special edition of Tomorrow's World travels back a century to discover the latest developments in science and technology from 1886.
- 6 January
  - Debut of the children's animated series and second programme in the trilogy to be produced by Maddocks Cartoon Productions, Jimbo and the Jet-Set on BBC1.
  - A regional news bulletin is broadcast after the Nine O'Clock News for the first time. It had originally been planned to appear the previous September to coincide with the previous year's relaunch of the Nine O'Clock News.
- 19 February – BBC1 airs Round Britain Whizz, an edition of the science series Q.E.D.. The 30-minute programme consists of a sped-up flight around the coastline of Great Britain with guest appearances from geologists and TV personalities including Patrick Moore, David Bellamy and Terry Wogan telling the viewer about the geology and natural history of certain areas.
- 1 April – As part of the BBC's Drugwatch campaign, BBC1 airs It's Not Just Zammo, a Newsround special presented by John Craven and Nick Ross that seeks to warn younger viewers about the dangers of using drugs. The programme follows a recent drug abuse storyline in Grange Hill involving the character Zammo McGuire (played by Lee MacDonald), and features the launch of a version of the anti-drugs song "Just Say No" recorded by members of the Grange Hill cast. The song goes on to reach the top ten of the UK Singles Chart, while members of the cast are invited to the White House to meet First Lady Nancy Reagan, who founded the Just Say No campaign.
- 8 May – For the first time, the BBC broadcasts live coverage of the local election results. The coverage airs until approximately 2.30am on both BBC1 and BBC Radio 4. BBC1's coverage is branded as a ‘Newsnight Special’.
- 9 May – BBC1 airs "Video Jukebox", a special extended edition of its Omnibus arts programme telling the story of the music video. It is presented by John Peel and John Walters.
- 24 July – BBC1 airs the opening ceremony from the 1986 Commonwealth Games in Edinburgh, which includes a 45-minute display produced by the BBC that celebrates the Spirit of Youth. BBC1 goes on to provide full live coverage of the event, with daily coverage from 9:20am until 6pm, with coverage only transferring to BBC2 for the final hour or two of competition so that BBC1 can broadcast its usual 6pm news hour.
- 28 July–29 August – Children's BBC switches to the traditional morning Summer block of programmes. Included is a series of special Newsround programmes called Newsround Special Edition, which tours the UK with the Radio 1 Roadshow.
- 4–29 August – Due to Children's BBC moving to mornings, the afternoon children's slot is dropped for this period. Much of the slot is replaced with a reshowing of Fame.
- 5 August – Michael Cashman makes his EastEnders debut as Colin Russell, the soap's first gay character.
- 31 August – Debut of Alan Bleasdale's four-part World War I drama The Monocled Mutineer on BBC1. The series causes some controversy when some right-wing newspapers cite it as an example of what they believe to be a left-wing bias of the BBC.
- 6 September – The first episode of medical drama Casualty airs on BBC1. Although an immediate success with viewers, the show attracts controversy because of its portrayal of an under-funded National Health Service, which is seen as a criticism of Margaret Thatcher's government.
- 16 October – The first two-hander episode of EastEnders, featuring Den and Angie Watts (Leslie Grantham and Anita Dobson), is aired by BBC1. The episode, in which Angie tells Den she has six months to live after he tells her he wants a divorce, was an experiment as the two-hander format had not been tried in a British soap before, but received well by viewers and critics.
- 24 October
  - Ahead of the launch of the BBC's new daytime service, News After Noon is broadcast for the final time. The bulletin is replaced by a revamped lunchtime news programme One O'Clock News.
  - The weekday mid-afternoon regional news summary is broadcast on BBC1 for the final time. From Monday 27 October, it is broadcast on BBC2.
- 27 October
  - BBC1 starts a full daytime television service. Before that day, excluding special events coverage, BBC1 had closed down at times during weekday mornings and afternoons, broadcasting trade test transmissions and from May 1983, Pages From Ceefax.
  - As part of the new service, Australian soap Neighbours makes its British television debut on BBC1, a year after it was first aired in its homeland.
- 10 November – Breakfast Time is relaunched with a more formal news and current affairs format.
- 13 November – Self-employed hod carrier Michael Lush is killed during his first rehearsal for a live stunt planned for BBC1's The Late, Late Breakfast Show. The stunt, called "Hang 'em High", involved bungee jumping from an exploding box suspended from a 120ft-high crane. The carabiner clip attaching his bungee rope to the crane sprang loose from its eyebolt during the jump, and he died instantly of multiple injuries. The 15 November edition is cancelled after presenter Noel Edmonds resigns, saying he does not "have the heart to carry on".
- 15 November – British television premiere of Michael Chrichton's science fiction crime drama Looker on BBC1.
- 16 November – Dennis Potter's critically acclaimed television serial The Singing Detective makes its debut on BBC1.
- 25 December – 30.15 million tune in to watch "Dirty" Den Watts hand wife Angie her divorce papers in EastEnders, making it the highest-rated episode of any drama in British television history.

=== 1987 ===
- 12 January – The five-part Australian World War I drama Anzacs makes its British television debut on BBC1.
- 27 February – The BBC and independent television begins a week of programming aimed at educating people about the AIDS virus. Highlights include AIDS – The Facts on BBC1, a short programme of facts and figures covering frequently asked questions about the disease, and First AIDS, an ITV comedy-sketch programme produced by London Weekend Television and featuring Mike Smith, Jonathan Ross and Emma Freud.
- 18 April – The final edition of Saturday Superstore is broadcast on BBC1.
- 22 May–20 June – BBC TV airs coverage of the first Rugby World Cup from Australia and New Zealand. This is the only time that the BBC has broadcast the tournament.
- 25 August – BBC1 airs the first public showing of Dennis Potter's 1976 television play Brimstone and Treacle, which was originally scheduled to air in 1976 but withdrawn shortly before broadcast.
- 26 September – Debut of Going Live!, a new live magazine show, broadcast on BBC1, and presented by Phillip Schofield and Sarah Greene.
- 12 October – BBC1 begins airing Going for Gold, a general knowledge quiz presented by Henry Kelly in which contestants from fourteen different European countries compete to become series champion. The winner of the first series, Daphne Hudson (later Daphne Fowler), receives ringside tickets at the 1988 Summer Olympics in Seoul, and goes on to become a familiar face on television after appearing in a number of other quizzes, including Fifteen to One and Eggheads.
- 15 October – During a weather forecast, BBC meteorologist Michael Fish reports "Earlier on today, apparently, a woman rang the BBC and said she heard there was a hurricane on the way; well, if you're watching, don't worry, there isn't, but having said that, actually, the weather will become very windy, but most of the strong winds, incidentally, will be down over Spain and across into France.". Hours later, Britain is hit by the worst storm for 284 years. Fish later drew criticism for the comments, but has since claimed that they referred to Florida, USA, and were linked to a news story immediately preceding the weather bulletin, but had been so widely repeated out of context that the British public remains convinced that he was referring to the approaching storm.
- 11 November – BBC1 airs Paul Hamann's documentary Fourteen Days in May, a film that recounts the final days before the execution of Edward Earl Johnson, an American prisoner convicted of rape and murder and imprisoned in the Mississippi State Penitentiary.
- 17 November – Fireman Sam, a children's television series about a fireman voiced and narrated by John Alderton, makes its debut on BBC1]
- 31 December – In an unusual move for a pre-recorded television series, the chimes of Big Ben are integrated into an episode of EastEnders on BBC1. Character Den Watts (Leslie Grantham) brought a television into the bar of the Queen Vic, 'watched' the chimes in their entirety and the episode resumed.

=== 1988 ===
- 4 January – BBC1 moves the repeat episode of Neighbours to a 5:35pm evening slot, the decision to do this having been made by controller Michael Grade on the advice of his daughter.
- 5 February – The inaugural Red Nose Day sees Comic Relief air its first A Night of Comic Relief fundraiser on BBC1.
- 23 May – Three gay rights activists invade the BBC studios during a Six O'Clock bulletin of the BBC News to protest about the introduction of Section 28, a law preventing schools from teaching their students about homosexuality. Protesters can be heard chanting as Sue Lawley continues to read the news, prompting the presenter to comment "we have been rather invaded by some people who we hope to be removing very shortly".
- 31 May – Debut of Charles Wood's screenplay Tumbledown about the experiences of Scots Guard Robert Lawrence, who was left paralysed after being shot in the head by a sniper at the Battle of Mount Tumbledown during the Falklands War. The film is shown again on 9 October.
- 1 September – To celebrate BBC Radio 1's FM "switch on day", BBC1's Top of the Pops is simulcast with Radio 1 for the first time, allowing listeners to hear the programme in stereo. This edition is presented by Steve Wright and Mark Goodier. Top of the Pops is then simulcast weekly with Radio 1 until August 1991.
- 12 September – Debut of Stoppit and Tidyup on BBC1, a 13-part animated series narrated by Terry Wogan and partly funded by the Tidy Britain Group charity.
- 18 September – On the Record replaces This Week News Week as BBC1 Sunday lunchtime political discussion programme.
- 14 October – Play School is broadcast for the final time on BBC1. The last new edition was shown in March.
- 17 October
  - Playbus, the replacement series for Play School makes its debut on BBC1.
  - The sitcom Wyatt's Watchdogs makes its debut on BBC1.
- 20 October – Debut of the 13-part children's stop-motion animated series Charlie Chalk, produced by Woodland Animations Ltd., the company behind Postman Pat makes its debut on BBC1, featuring the voices of Barbara Leigh-Hunt, Michael Williams and John Wells. The last three episodes will air the following year.
- 8 November – BBC1 airs Episode 523 of Neighbours, featuring the wedding of Scott Robinson and Charlene Mitchell (played by Jason Donovan and Kylie Minogue), which is watched by 20 million viewers.
- 13 November–18 December – The Lion, the Witch and the Wardrobe, one of C.S. Lewis's Chronicles of Narnia, is aired as a six-part TV serial by the BBC, featuring actors including Ronald Pickup, Barbara Kellerman and Michael Aldridge.
- Autumn – BBC1 takes its first tentative steps into later closedowns. Previously, weekday programmes ended no later than 12:15am and weekend broadcasting ended at 1:30am.

=== 1989 ===
- 15 March – BBC1 airs John's Not Mad, an edition of the QED documentary strand that shadowed John Davidson, a 15-year-old from Galashiels in Scotland, with severe Tourette syndrome. The film explores John's life in terms of his family and the close-knit community around him, and how they all cope with a misunderstood condition.
- 12 July – A special edition of Question Time from Paris, France, is the last to be chaired by Robin Day.
- 10 September – BBC1 begins airing Screen One, an anthology of one-off dramas. The first film is One Way Out, directed by Mick Ford, and starring Bob Peck, Denis Lawson, Samantha Bond and Enn Reitel.
- 13 September – Debut of the children's series Bodger & Badger on BBC1, starring Andy Cunningham. It would run until 1999.
- 14 September
  - Peter Sissons takes over as presenter of Question Time as the series returns after its Summer break.
  - The third and final programme in the trilogy to be produced by Maddocks Cartoon Productions, Penny Crayon, makes its debut on BBC1.
  - The Poddington Peas also makes its debut on BBC1.
- 29 September – The final edition of Breakfast Time is broadcast.
- 2 October – BBC1's new breakfast programme BBC Breakfast News is broadcast for the first time.
- 16 October – The first episode of the sitcom Birds of a Feather airs, starring Pauline Quirke, Linda Robson and Lesley Joseph. It would run until 1998 and would be revived on ITV in 2014.
- 2 November – The final episode of Blackadder Goes Forth, "Goodbyeee" is broadcast on BBC1. With one of the most moving endings ever seen on British television, it is broadcast nine days before Armistice Day.
- 19–26 November – Prince Caspian becomes the second Narnia book to be aired as a television serial by the BBC in two parts.
- 3–24 December – The Voyage of the Dawn Treader, another Narnia story, is aired as a four-part serial by the BBC.
- 6 December – The last episode of the 26-year original run of Doctor Who, Part 3 of Survival, is broadcast on BBC1. The show would not resume regular airing for 16 years, with the only new material during this time being an American telemovie in 1996.

== 1990s ==
=== 1990 ===
- 4 January – The sitcom One Foot in the Grave makes its debut on BBC1.
- January – British Medical Television is broadcast for the final time.
- 16 April – BBC1 airs Nelson Mandela – an International Tribute, a concert held at Wembley Stadium in honour of Nelson Mandela. The concert features a number of prominent musicians, including Anita Baker, Tracy Chapman, Stanley Clarke, Natalie Cole, George Duke, Peter Gabriel and Patti LaBelle. With Nelson Mandela himself also in attendance.
- 7 September – The Generation Game is revived on BBC1 with Bruce Forsyth returning to host, Jim Davidson replaces him in 1995.
- 13 September – BBC1 airs the 1000th episode of Neighbours.
- 15 September – Raymond Baxter introduces BBC1's live coverage of the fly-past and parade at Buckingham Palace as the Royal Air Force marks the 50th anniversary of the Battle of Britain.
- 16 September – Cliff Michelmore introduces BBC1's coverage of the Battle of Britain Service from Westminster Abbey, conducted by Archbishop of Canterbury Rev. Dr. Robert Runcie.
- 15 October – BBC1 launches a new morning service called Daytime UK. Linked live from Birmingham, the service runs for four hours, from 8:50am until lunchtime.
- 29 October – Debut of Keeping Up Appearances, a sitcom starring Patricia Routledge on BBC1.
- 18 November–23 December – The BBC's serialisation of the Chronicles of Narnia concludes with the fourth and final story, The Silver Chair, being aired in six parts.
- 22 November – Following Margaret Thatcher's resignation as Prime Minister, that evening's edition of Question Time, broadcast from London's Barbican Centre, is transmitted in two parts, with two different panels. The first part features Enoch Powell, David Owen, James Callaghan and Simon Jenkins, while Michael Howard, Nigel Lawson, Paddy Ashdown and Roy Hattersley are the panellists for the second part.
- 25 November – BBC1 airs the final episode of Howards' Way.
- 25 December – Steven Spielberg's 1982 science fiction adventure E.T. makes its British television debut on BBC1.

=== 1991 ===
BBC1 logo used from 1991 to 1997

- 7 January – BBC1 launches the local news programme, East Midlands Today for the East Midlands region. News coverage for the area had previously been provided by a seven-minute opt-out from the Birmingham-based Midlands Today.
- 17 January – BBC1 abandons most of its scheduled programming to bring live coverage of the Gulf War after the Allied Forces launch the Operation Desert Storm against Iraq, which interrupted the film Villain the previous day. BBC Breakfast News runs from 6:30am to 10am (instead of its usual 6:30 to 8:55am timeslot), followed by War in the Gulf, a news special hosted by David Dimbleby until 12:55pm, which resulted in the temporary suspension of the morning programming block Daytime UK. The One O'Clock News is extended to an hour, leading to the lunchtime showing of Neighbours airing thirty minutes later than planned. War in the Gulf then resumes until the second showing of the soap's latest episode airing in its usual timeslot at 5:35pm. The Children's BBC afternoon block moves briefly to BBC2 during the first days of the conflict. An hour-long edition of the Six O'Clock News then aired, followed by the regional news magazines being shown at 7pm, thirty minutes later than planned. A newsflash is then shown afterwards, followed by EastEnders and Tomorrow's World (which were both sandwiched by another newsflash at 8pm) airing at their usual timeslot. A unscheduled repeat of Wildlife on One airs at 8:30pm, then followed by a speech from Prime Minister John Major and an extended Nine O'Clock News airing afterwards. News coverage then continued with a two-part edition of Question Time. Finally, another newsflash airs on BBC1 before the channel, instead of closing down as usual, airs pages from Ceefax during the night, in case of something happening. Among programmes pulled from that day's schedule are Going for Gold, Top of the Pops, The Brittas Empire and Spenser: For Hire, while Crimewatch UK (and its late night update) moves to BBC2. Over the coming weeks, there is extensive live coverage on BBC1 of events in the Persian Gulf although as the war develops, the War in the Gulf coverage is scaled back. However, extended and additional news bulletins continue to be broadcast until the end of the war on 2 March.
- 15 February – The COW ident is seen for the final time on BBC1, after six years in use.
- 16 February – BBC1 and BBC2 both receive new idents, both generated from laserdisc and featuring the BBC corporate logo introduced in 1986. BBC1's new ident is a numeral '1' encased in a globe, known as the "Virtual Globe".
- 30 April – Debut of the snooker-based game show Big Break, presented by Jim Davidson and John Virgo, it would run until 2002.
- 22 July – BBC1 airs an extended edition of Wogan in which Terry Wogan meets and talks to pop star Madonna.
- 24 July – The final programme to be recorded at the BBC Television Theatre in Shepherd's Bush is aired, an edition of Wogan recorded on 18 July 1991.
- 31 August – BBC television starts officially broadcasting in stereo using the NICAM system although some transmitters had been broadcasting in stereo since 1986, but these were classified as tests.
- 6 October – BBC1 airs Conundrum, the final episode in the original run of Dallas. The feature-length episode imagines a world in which the soap's central character, J. R. Ewing had not existed.
- 17 November – Debut of Biteback, a monthly programme that gives viewers a right-to-reply on issues raised by BBC content. It is presented by Julian Pettifer.
- 23 November – Debut of the light entertainment show Noel's House Party, presented by Noel Edmonds. It would run until 1999.

=== 1992 ===
- 21 January – BBC Select launches on BBC Television as an overnight subscription service, showing specialist programmes for professionals including businessmen, lawyers, teachers and nurses. However, the first series, The Way Ahead, made for the Department of Social Security, is distributed free, on condition that no financial gain be made from it. The subscription service launches shortly after, showing specialist programmes for professionals including businessmen, lawyers, teachers and nurses, although some programmes continue to be shown free-to-air.
- 3 July – After more than seven years on air, Terry Wogan's thrice-weekly chat show Wogan is broadcast for the final time.
- 6 July – BBC1 launches the ill-fated Eldorado, a soap about a group of ex-pats living in Spain. The series is axed the following year.
- 12 October – As part of an attempt to compete better with the success of ITV's This Morning, BBC1 launches its own mid-morning magazine show called Good Morning with Anne and Nick.
- 31 October – The controversial one-off drama Ghostwatch is broadcast on BBC1, a 'live' investigation into a haunted North London house.

=== 1993 ===
- 3 January – Debut of Breakfast with Frost, a Sunday morning current affairs programme on BBC1, presented by David Frost.
- 6 January – Debut of Clive James' acclaimed series Fame in the 20th Century, an eight-part BBC1 programme in which he examines the nature of 20th century fame using archive footage and commentary. It concludes on 24 February.
- 6 March – An IRA bomb scare at BBC Television Centre means that the evening's edition of Noel's House Party cannot be shown. Instead, after a repeat of the previous year's Noel's Christmas Presents, host Noel Edmonds is forced to introduce a Tom and Jerry cartoon in its place, The Zoot Cat.
- 17 April – The final edition of Going Live! airs after a six-year run.
- 9 July – BBC1 airs the final episode of Eldorado. The soap was axed due to poor ratings.
- 2 October – The new Saturday morning children's series Live & Kicking makes its debut on BBC1, presented by Andi Peters, Emma Forbes and John Barrowman.
- 26–27 November – BBC1 airs the two-part Doctor Who special Dimensions in Time, a crossover with EastEnders. The episode is part of the 1993 Children in Need telethon, and the first Doctor Who episode to be televised since the series ended in December 1989.
- 9 December – Peter Sissons hosts his last edition of Question Time, having chaired the political debate programme since 1989.

=== 1994 ===
- 13 January – David Dimbleby takes over as host of Question Time.
- 12 February – BBC1 airs Tunnel Vision: Le Walk, a special live coverage event presented by Mike Smith, Anthea Turner and Juliet Morris, which explores the 31-mile charity walk through the Channel Tunnel from France during the last eight hours led by Daley Thompson, Kriss Akabusi, Graham Gooch, Todd Carty and Nicholas Witchell, with support from Mr Blobby, leading the celebration committee for those who have made it to England.
- 11 April – BBC1 introduces a third weekly episode of EastEnders which airs on Mondays at 8pm.
- 6 May – BBC1 broadcasts special live coverage for the opening of Channel Tunnel, as Queen Elizabeth II travels to Calais by train, and will be greeted by president François Mitterrand who also jointly opens the French terminal, having journeyed on the shuttle to Folkestone as they inaugurate the British end of the venture.
- 25 May – Debut of the game show Wipeout created by Bob Fraser and hosted by Paul Daniels.
- 19 June – That's Life!, the long-running magazine series presented by Esther Rantzen, is broadcast for the final time following twenty-one years on air.
- 14 July – BBC1 airs Episode 1000 of EastEnders, and Episode 2000 of Neighbours.
- 27 July – Debut of The Human Animal on BBC1, a six-part nature documentary series written and presented by Desmond Morris described as "a study of human behaviour from a zoological perspective", travels the world to film the diverse customs and habits of various regions while suggesting common roots. It ends on 31 August.
- 17 August
  - BBC1 airs The Best of 'Allo 'Allo!, a special 50-minute episode featuring a compilation of clips from the series as well as featuring new scenes including Gorden Kaye and Carmen Silvera, in which René and Edith reminisce about the events of the war.
  - The fourth episode of BBC1's The Human Animal includes sexually explicit scenes when it depicted a couple making love by using tiny endoscopic cameras placed inside both bodies to show intimate orifices. It also depicts the insertion of a man's erect penis into a woman's vagina and the subsequent orgasm. More than 12 million viewers watch the programme.
- 29 August – Debut of veterinary-based series Animal Hospital on BBC1, presented by Australian entertainer and singer Rolf Harris. It would run until 2004.
- 17 October – The Morning on BBC1, a new weekday morning schedule of magazine, chat and entertainment programmes introduced by Mo Dutta begins airing.
- 10 November – Debut of the sitcom The Vicar of Dibley, starring Dawn French.
- 19 November – BBC1 airs the first National Lottery draw, which is hosted by Noel Edmonds.

=== 1995 ===
- 19 February – 10th anniversary of EastEnders. As part of the celebrations, the first 25 episodes from 1985 are repeated each morning at 10am during February and March, starting from episode one on 20 February, and ending on 24 March. Selected episodes from 1985 and 1986 are also repeated on BBC1 on Friday evenings at 8:30pm for a short while. Billed as The Unforgettable EastEnders the episodes aired are as follows:
  - 17 February: The identity of the father of Michelle Fowler's baby is revealed in October 1985.
  - 24 February: Michelle and Lofty's wedding day in September 1986.
  - 3 March: Den Watts hands Angie divorce papers on Christmas Day 1986.
  - 10 March: A Two-hander episode featuring Dot and Ethel from July 1987.
- 31 May – Debut of the new twice-weekly soap Castles, centering on the lives of the middle-class Castle family. The series attracts a relatively poor peak time audience of 3.2 million, leading the corporation's head of Drama, Charles Denton to brand it a failure. It is cancelled after 26 episodes with the last one airing on 20 August.
- 24 September – Pride and Prejudice, the BBC's massively popular adaptation of Jane Austen's novel, makes its debut on BBC1. The six-part serial finishes on 29 October.
- 20 November – BBC1 airs the interview of Diana, Princess of Wales on Panorama.

=== 1996 ===
- 24 February–3 March – The four-part adaptation of Minette Walters' psychological thriller The Sculptress airs over two weekends, starring Pauline Quirke, Caroline Goodall and Christopher Fulford.
- 2 May – Debut of the fly-on-the-wall docusoap Airport.
- 24 May – Good Morning with Anne and Nick ends after a four-year run.
- 27 May – Doctor Who, an American television movie continuation of the famous British series of the same name, airs on BBC1.
- 10 June–23 August – For the Summer period, the late afternoon block of children's programmes aired on BBC1 are transferred to BBC2.
- 2 September – Launch of "Daytime on 1", BBC1's new daily schedule that includes six and a half hours of drama, quiz shows, discussion programming, chat shows and cookery shows.
- 15 September – Debut of Rhodes, an eight-part BBC1 drama series about the life of the controversial British adventurer and empire-builder Cecil Rhodes. The series concludes on 3 November. The series took a decade to make, employed over 10,000 extras, and at a cost of £10m makes it the most expensive British television project to date. However, despite a high-profile publicity campaign leading up to its launch, Rhodes attracts relatively poor viewing figures, with 7.6 million tuning into the first episode and 4.8 million watching the second, and it is quickly panned by critics. The BBC is also forced to launch an accompanying booklet about Cecil Rhodes as the series assumes a prior knowledge of the figure and many viewers are unfamiliar with him.
- 23 November – The American animated series The Simpsons begins airing on BBC1, starting with the episode "There's No Disgrace Like Home", although the channel would air the show until February 1997 when it is shown full-time on BBC2.

=== 1997 ===
BBC One logo used from 1997 to 2002

- 14 January – Viewing figures released for 1996 indicate BBC1 and BBC2 as the only terrestrial channels to increase their audience share during the year.
- 5 February – The first Wednesday edition of The National Lottery Live is aired with the introduction of a second weekly draw.
- 10 June – Debut of the docusoap Driving School.
- 30 June – BBC1 airs coverage of the Hong Kong handover ceremony marking the Transfer of sovereignty over Hong Kong from the United Kingdom to China, an event that happens at midnight local time (17:00 BST).
- 26 August – Debut of the veterinary-based documentary series Vets in Practice.
- 31 August – BBC1 interrupts the late-night film Borsalino to bring a newsflash about Diana, Princess of Wales's car accident. The film then resumes until the end, and when it is time to BBC1 to close down, they do not. Instead, it stays on the air throughout the night, simulcasting with BBC World News to bring updates of the accident and Diana's subsequent death, which is announced at 5am. This is the first time that the BBC's international news channel had been seen in the UK. At 6am, a rolling news programme, first anchored by Martyn Lewis and from 1pm by Peter Sissons, is shown on both BBC1 and BBC2 until the latter breaks away at 3pm to provide alternative programming (which included Countryfile, the debut of Full Circle with Michael Palin and Everyman, all three scheduled to be shown on BBC1 on that day). The channel continues to provide coverage until closedown when it once again hands over to BBC World News. A weather bulletin, presented by John Kettley, is the only non-Diana programme to air on BBC1 on that day. Among the programmes to be pulled from the day's schedule are Children's BBC, Breakfast with Frost, See Hear, Snowy River: the McGregor Saga, both of that day's EastEnders omnibus, Escape to Athena, Songs of Praise, Oh, Doctor Beeching!, Airplane II: The Sequel, and Goin' South.
- 1–5 September – BBC1 airs extended news coverage of the events following Princess Diana's death.
- 6 September – BBC1 airs live coverage of the funeral of Diana, Princess of Wales from 6am to 3pm.
- 4 October – The channel is now officially known as BBC One rather than BBC1. "One" was written all-caps in logo and was placed right of the new BBC logo. On the same day, BBC One adopts the new "hot air balloon" globe identifications. See BBC One 'Balloon' idents.
- 8 November – BBC One fully closes down for the last time and ends its day with God Save the Queen for the final time.
- 9 November – At the end of its broadcast day, instead of closing down, BBC One hands over to BBC News 24, which launched earlier that day.
- 20 November – BBC One airs live coverage of the service of thanksgiving marking the golden wedding anniversary of Queen Elizabeth II and Prince Philip, held at Westminster Abbey.

=== 1998 ===
- 9 January – Chat show host Michael Parkinson returns to television after several years away with a new series of Parkinson on BBC One. Guests on the first edition are Sir Anthony Hopkins, Barry Manilow and Paul Merton.
- 13 January – Debut of the docusoap The Cruise.
- 11 June – Blue Peter presenters Katy Hill and Richard Bacon bury a time capsule containing various items associated with the programme in the foundations of the Millennium Dome. It will be opened in 2050.
- 25 June – The final episode of BBC One's The Human Body is the first British television programme to show the final moments of a cancer patient. Herbert Mower, who died the previous year, had given permission for his death to be recorded for the series.
- 1 July – BBC One shows highlights of the Diana, Princess of Wales Tribute Concert held at Althorp Park on 27 June.
- 6 October – The BBC announces plans to revamp its news bulletins following an 18-month review of news programming, the largest ever undertaken in the UK. Changes will include a new look Six O'Clock News concentrating on national and regional stories, and an increase in world news stories for the Nine O'Clock News.
- 16 October – Blue Peter celebrates its 40th anniversary with a special show featuring former presenters.
- 27 October – As part of its Q.E.D. strand, BBC One airs Hope for Helen, a documentary following television presenter Helen Rollason's fight against terminal cancer. She had been diagnosed with the condition the previous year and given three months to live.
- 18 December – BBC political correspondent Huw Edwards is confirmed as the new face of the Six O'Clock News, taking over when the programme is revamped next year.

=== 1999 ===
- 12 January – Debut of the Casualty spin-off, Holby City on BBC One. Among the cast are several former soap stars, including Michael French, Angela Griffin, Nicola Stephenson and Lisa Faulkner.
- 13 January – BBC One's audience share drops below 30% for the first time.
- 13 February – BBC One airs "Face Value", the 250th episode of Casualty.
- 2 April – BBC One airs Parkinson Meets Woody Allen, a 50-minute programme in which film director Woody Allen gives his first British television interview for 35 years. Allen is questioned extensively about his private life by host Michael Parkinson, but is reluctant to speak on some topics. The BBC subsequently rejects reports that Allen had asked producers to edit out parts of the interview in which he discusses his marriage to his stepdaughter.
- 6–7 May – BBC One provides coverage of the first elections to the Scottish Parliament and Welsh Assembly, as well as the year's local elections.
- 5 September – BBC One begins airing Antiques Inspectors, the final series to be recorded by Jill Dando prior to her murder on 26 April. The series had made its debut with Dando as presenter on 25 April, with filming of the final episode completed two days before that. The programme was subsequently cancelled, but it was decided later in the year that it should be aired as a tribute to the presenter.
- 6 September – The popular children's series Tweenies makes its debut on BBC Two at 10:30am and again at 3:25pm on BBC One.
- 4 October–8 November – The six-part documentary series Walking with Dinosaurs airs on BBC One, using computer-generated imagery and animatronics to show life in the Mesozoic Era.
- 31 December – Over 60 countries take part in 2000 Today, a programme seeing in the start of the new millennium. In the UK, the 28-hour marathon show is shown on BBC One and hosted by Michael Parkinson, Gaby Roslin and David Dimbleby.

== 2000s ==
=== 2000 ===
- 2 January – BBC One airs a millennium special of its garden makeover series Ground Force in which Alan Titchmarsh, Charlie Dimmock and Tommy Walsh travel to the South African village of Qunu to design and build a garden for former President Nelson Mandela.
- 18 January – Launch of Castaway 2000 on BBC One, a reality television show billed as a bold experiment for the new millennium. Thirty-six men, women and children from the British public are placed on Taransay, a remote Scottish island in the Outer Hebrides for a year and must build a sustainable self-sufficient community. It ends on New Year's Day 2001.
- 13 March – Debut of the antiques-based series Bargain Hunt.
- 26 March – Debut of Doctors, BBC One's new daily serial set in a doctors' surgery. The first episode is shown at 6:35pm on a Sunday evening, before continuing on weekdays at 12:30pm.
- 28 August – The first episode of the countryside drama Down to Earth airs on BBC One, starring Pauline Quirke and Warren Clarke.
- 14 September – Lorraine Heggessey is appointed Controller of BBC One, becoming the first woman to hold the post. She will take over from present Controller, Peter Salmon on 1 November.
- 2 October – The first edition of the BBC's revamped breakfast news programme Breakfast is broadcast. It is carried on both BBC One and BBC News 24. Previously, News 24 had aired its own breakfast programme with Breakfast 24.
- 3 October – The BBC confirms it will move its Nine O'Clock News to 10pm from 16 October to compete with ITV's relaunch of News at Ten. The announcement causes surprise as it had been expected the changes would take effect from October 2001. Politicians from all major political parties criticise the BBC's decision, fearing it will affect news quality.
- 13 October – The flagship BBC One news programme the Nine O'Clock News ends after a run of 30 years after the BBC earlier announced that it was to move the bulletin to 10pm. The BBC News at Ten is launched on 16 October. The change attracts criticism from both the National Consumer Council and the Culture Secretary Chris Smith. The Nine O'Clock News also moves to its dedicated channel on the same day. ITV later announces its intention to reinstate News at Ten from January 2001.
- 20 October – Have I Got News for You returns for a new series, moving from BBC Two to BBC One.
- 21 October – Parkinson returns to BBC One for a new series as part of the Saturday night schedule, having previously aired on Fridays since its relaunch in 1998.
- 28 October – Footballer David Beckham appears on Parkinson, telling Michael Parkinson that he plans to become "the best footballer in the world" while at Manchester United.
- 31 October – The Weakest Link makes its BBC One debut as part of the channel's evening schedule. Billed as the Champions' League, the series sees winning contestants from BBC Two's daytime version of the quiz return to compete for a £20,000 prize, double the amount offered by the daily show.
- 20 November – The final episode of One Foot in the Grave is shown on BBC One.
- 11 December – BBC One airs a BBC News special, Prince William in Chile, showing footage of Prince William's charity expedition to Chilean Patagonia with Raleigh International. The Prince was interviewed and filmed during the ten-week trip, with an interview released to the media on 10 December.

=== 2001 ===
- 10 August – The BBC introduces a fourth weekly episode of EastEnders, to be broadcast on Fridays at 8pm. This causes some controversy as the first episode clashes with Coronation Street which has been moved to 8pm to make way for an hour-long episode of Emmerdale at 7pm. In this first head-to-head battle, EastEnders claims victory over its rival.
- 3 September – Kent and Sussex get their own news programme, South East Today.
- 11 September – Viewers witness a terrorist attack on the United States and the collapse of the Twin Towers in New York City, live on television. BBC One simulcasts BBC News 24's coverage immediately after the lunchtime showing of Neighbours, cancelling Diagnosis: Murder and a repeat of Birds of a Feather, while the CBBC programming block and the afternoon repeat of Neighbours moves to BBC Two. Both afternoon and evening regional news magazines only runs for five minutes due to the news coverage. A news special replaces Holiday: You Call the Shots, while EastEnders and the start of a new series of Changing Rooms airs as usual. A new episode of Murder Rooms: The Dark Beginnings of Sherlock Holmes is replaced by another news special, named America Under Siege, and presented by David Dimbleby, while the documentary series Brighton Bill and the film Fire in the Sky are also dropped, to make way for a repeat of the documentary series Boss Women. BBC One joins BBC News 24 one hour earlier than scheduled.
- 15 September – The Saturday morning children's show Live & Kicking comes to an end after eight years. The final edition is presented by Sarah Cawood, Heather Suttie, Ortis Deley and Trey Farley.
- 21 September – BBC One broadcasts a live feed of America: A Tribute to Heroes, a two-hour telethon from the United States to raise money for the victims of the 11 September terrorist attacks. The telethon features stars of film and music. The event is repeated by BBC One on 23 September. The telethon raises $150m (£103m), which will be donated to the United Way's 11 September Fund.
- 22 September – The first episode of The Saturday Show airs, presented by Dani Behr and Joe Mace.
- 1 October – BBC London is launched, replacing Newsroom South East.

=== 2002 ===
BBC One logo used from 2002 to 2006

- 27 February – BBC One airs The Boy Can't Help It, a follow up documentary to the 1989 Q.E.D. programme, John's Not Mad, which deals with sufferers of Tourette syndrome.
- 26 March – BBC One announces that the current hot-air balloon idents are to be axed and to be replaced by a new set with the Rhythm & Movement idents from 29 March.
- 28 March – At 2:10am (in Northern Ireland at 2:50am), the last Balloon ident is shown on BBC One and with it, the last time the globe is used as the channel's symbol, having been used in varying forms since 1963.
- 29 March – The 'Rhythm & Movement' idents is first shown at 9am, replacing the Balloon idents after five years on-air. "One" in logo was moved from the right side to below the BBC logo.
- 20 April – The Generation Game ends for a second time after twelve years.
- 21 April – Blackadder: Back & Forth makes its terrestrial television debut on BBC One, the programme was scheduled to air on 31 March but was postponed because of ongoing coverage of the death of the Queen Mother.
- 26 April – Making her first appearance as a panellist on an edition of Have I Got News for You at the age of 16, singer Charlotte Church becomes the youngest person to appear on the show.
- 14 May – The Experiment makes its debut on BBC One.
- 16 May – A UK version of The Chair, an American game show hosted by former tennis player John McEnroe in which contestants must control their heart rate while answering questions, will be produced for BBC One, it is reported. he will also present the UK version, which will air in the Autumn.
- 21 May – More than 100 viewers have complained to the BBC about an episode of BBC One's new spy drama Spooks (which began on 13 May) aired the previous evening which depicted an MI5 agent having her head pushed into a deep fat fryer before being shot.
- 3 June – The Golden Jubilee of Elizabeth II. During the Golden Jubilee Weekend, BBC One airs the Party at the Palace.
- 13 June – BBC One airs Episode 4000 of Neighbours.
- 11 July – BBC One airs a special edition of Parkinson in which Michael Parkinson travels to South Africa to talk with its former president Nelson Mandela.
- 13 July – BBC One airs the first Sport Relief telethon, with the event raising money for the charity.
- 25 August – BBC One airs a special edition of its garden makeover series Ground Force in which Alan Titchmarsh, Charlie Dimmock and Tommy Walsh transform a public space in New York into a memorial garden to mark the first anniversary of the 11 September attacks.
- 8 September – BBC One celebrates the 21st anniversary of its sitcom Only Fools and Horses, by repeating the first episode originally aired in 1981.
- 9 September – BBC One launches Inside Out, a regionally based television series in England. The series focuses on stories from the local area of each BBC region and replaces a number of different titles previously used on BBC Two.
- 4 October – Debut of the talent search series Fame Academy, but it would end just a year later.
- 13 October – BBC One airs Mr Trebus: A Life of Grime, a 60-minute programme paying tribute to Edmund Trebus, a compulsive hoarder who became famous after featuring in the first series of A Life of Grime in 1999.
- 30 October – Have I Got News For You presenter Angus Deayton is sacked after allegations regarding his personal life appeared in the media. Since Deayton's departure, the show has been hosted by a different guest presenter each week, a format that continues to this day.
- 31 December – BBC One airs the final edition of Vets in Practice, a special in which the show's participants discuss their time with the series.

=== 2003 ===
- 12 February – In the weeks leading up to the Iraq War, the BBC screens a series of programmes examining the case for and against war. The centrepiece of this is Iraq Day: The Case For and Against War, a 90-minute programme on BBC One on that day. Presented by Peter Snow. the programme analyses the possible implications of a war in the Middle East and attempts to gauge public opinion on the subject with a viewers poll.
- 5 March – BBC One airs Mandela: The Living Legend, a two-part documentary series whose film crew had six months of unprecedented access to Nelson Mandela. The second part airs on 12 March.
- 7 March – Singer George Michael makes his first appearance on BBC One's Top of the Pops in 17 years, with a cover of Don McLean's protest song "The Grave", but runs into conflict with the show's producers for an anti-war, anti-Blair T-shirt worn by some members of his band.
- 16 July – BBC One airs the final edition of Tomorrow's World. It will be fifteen years later in 2018 before a new edition of the programme is broadcast.
- 25 December – Sleepless in Peckham, the final episode of Only Fools and Horses is aired on BBC One. Preliminary figures released two days later indicate it is watched by 15.5 million viewers.

=== 2004 ===
- 2 January – The BBC cancels the appearance of Coca-Cola sponsorship credits in the music charts in its BBC One Top of the Pops show, after criticism from politicians and health campaigners that it would be promoting junk food and unhealthy drink products to teenagers.
- 16 January – Robert Kilroy-Silk resigns as a BBC One talk show host after 17 years following the controversy over comments he made about Arabs.
- 15 May – Strictly Come Dancing makes its debut on BBC One.
- 8 July – The first Schools edition of Question Time is aired on BBC One. Recorded in London, the panel is made up of guests chosen by the winners of the Schools Question Time Challenge.
- 16 September – BBC One airs a special edition of Question Time to celebrate its 25th anniversary.
- 29 November – The BBC announces that Top of the Pops will move from its Friday evening BBC One slot to BBC Two, where it will air on Sunday evenings.
- 25 December – The first Harry Potter film, Harry Potter and the Philosopher's Stone makes its UK television debut on BBC One as part of the channel's Christmas Day lineup.

=== 2005 ===
- 26 March – Nine years after its last new episode and sixteen years since its last regular run, Doctor Who returns to BBC One for a new series, the twenty-seventh in total since 1963. Christopher Eccleston and Billie Piper star. An average 10.81 million viewers, over 40% of the watching audience, tune in, winning its timeslot and making it No. 3 BBC show and No. 7 across all channels for the week. The premiere episode of the revival, "Rose", went on to become the UK's seventh highest-rated programme of 2005.
- 13 May – To celebrate the 80th birthday of Queen Elizabeth II in 2006, artist Rolf Harris is to create an oil portrait of her as part of a special edition of his BBC One show Rolf on Art, it is announced. The programme will air later this year or in early 2006.
- 29 May – BBC One airs the final edition of Breakfast with Frost after a twelve-year run.
- 18 June – Christopher Eccleston's final episode of the Ninth Doctor in Doctor Who, 'The Parting of the Ways', is broadcast on BBC One. David Tennant becomes the Tenth Doctor in the same episode.
- 25 June – The Girl in the Café, a comedy-drama by Richard Curtis made as part of the global Make Poverty History campaign, is shown by both BBC One in the United Kingdom and HBO in the United States on the same day.
- 12 July – BBC One airs the 250th episode of Holby City.
- 17 July – After forty-one years broadcasting on BBC One, music show Top of the Pops is switched to BBC Two due to declining audiences. This is not enough to save it, and it is axed the following year.
- 4 August – BBC One airs Sinatra: Dark Star, a documentary investigating rumours of Frank Sinatra's links to organised crime.
- 3 September – After several revamps and presenting changes, BBC One airs the final edition of its children's entertainment series The Saturday Show.
- 11 September – BBC One launches Sunday AM, a Sunday morning current affairs programme presented by Andrew Marr.
- 20 September – BBC One airs Derailed, a docudrama dealing with the 1999 Ladbroke Grove rail crash.
- 8 October – BBC One airs the 500th episode of Casualty.
- 27 October – 16 December–Bleak House, a 15-episode adaptation of the Charles Dickens novel of the same name designed to capture a soap opera-style audience by using Dickens's original serial structure in half-hour episodes, is broadcast on BBC One.
- 7–28 November – BBC One broadcasts ShakespeaRe-Told, a series of four adaptations of William Shakespeare's plays based in 21st century Britain. The plays in order are Much Ado About Nothing, Macbeth, The Taming of the Shrew, and A Midsummer Night's Dream.
- 11 November – EastEnders is the first British drama to feature a two-minute silence. This episode later goes on to win the British Soap Award for 'Best Single Episode'.
- 21 December – The BBC announces that is to trial a three-month experiment in which its Saturday morning schedules for BBC One and BBC Two will be swapped. The changes, taking effect from January 2006, are being implemented because of frequent scheduling changes caused by big events and breaking news stories, and will mean children's programming will be absent from BBC One's Saturday morning lineup for the first time since 1976.
- 25 December – BBC One airs the Doctor Who Christmas Special, "The Christmas Invasion"; this episode marks David Tennant's first full-length story as the Tenth Doctor.

=== 2006 ===
BBC One logo used from 2006 to 2021.

- 1 January – BBC One airs The Queen by Rolf, a documentary following artist Rolf Harris as he paints a portrait of the Queen.
- 9 January – Debut of the offbeat police drama Life on Mars on BBC One.
- 15 February – BBC One debuts Davina, a chat show presented by Davina McCall. Guests on the first edition include Charlotte Church, Tess Daly and Vernon Kay. The show proves to be a disaster, with The Guardian's Gareth Maclean noting that McCall "found herself floundering and foundering, struggling through [interviews], and exposing herself in a way from which even the hardiest flasher would recoil", while Jonathan Ross blames a poor guest line up. The 8 March edition gives BBC One its worst ever peak time ratings of 2.75 million. By the time the show ends on 12 April ratings have fallen to below 2.5 million. It is axed shortly afterwards.
- 23 February – Just the Two of Us debuts on BBC One.
- 19 June – BBC One Controller Peter Fincham announces that They Think It's All Over will not be recommissioned for a new series, ending a run of eleven years on air.
- 29 July – Debut of How Do You Solve a Problem Like Maria? on BBC One.
- 16 September – Connie Fisher wins BBC One's How Do You Solve a Problems Like Maria?. She will make her debut in the role in a revival of The Sound of Music at London's Palladium Theatre on 14 November.
- 20 September – BBC One's daytime soap Doctors celebrates its 1000th episode with a one-hour special.
- 22 September – BBC One airs Episode 5000 of Neighbours.
- 6 October – After four and a half years, the BBC 'Rhythm & Movement' idents are shown for the final time on BBC One at 1:10 am during the evening hours, as part of a special montage (2:55 am on BBC One Northern Ireland).
- 7 October – The 'Circle' idents debuted at 10 am. A new logo also debuted, with "One" now being written all lowercase and being larger than the BBC logo. "One" was set right to the BBC logo, just like it was between 1997 and 2002. This logo would remain in use until 20 October 2021.
- 19 December – Following the success of How Do You Solve a Problem Like Maria?, BBC One announces plans for Any Dream Will Do, a follow up series that will search for someone to play Joseph in the West End musical, Joseph and the Amazing Technicolor Dreamcoat.

=== 2007 ===
- 27 January – Grandstand, the flagship BBC sports programme, is aired for the final time on BBC One, after nearly 50 years on television screens. The very last edition is broadcast the following day on BBC Two.
- 9 March – The BBC's Castaway returns for a second, but shorter series.
- 10 April – BBC One airs the concluding episode of the second and final series of Life on Mars.
- 14 May – BBC One broadcasts "Scientology and Me" a Panorama investigation into Scientology by journalist John Sweeney. A clip from the programme of Sweeney losing his temper and shouting at a disruptive scientologist representative is widely released on the internet and by DVD by scientologists prior to airing.
- 9 June – Lee Mead wins BBC One's Any Dream Will Do and will take the lead role of Joseph in the Andrew Lloyd Webber musical Joseph and the Amazing Technicolour Dreamcoat at the Adelphi Theatre from 17 July. ITV's Grease is the Word is won by Danny Bayne and Susan McFadden, who will play Danny and Sandy in a forthcoming production of Grease beginning at the Piccadilly Theatre on 8 August.
- 1 July – BBC One airs the Concert for Diana on what would have been the 46th birthday of the late Diana, Princess of Wales.
- 9 July - A brand new comedy-drama preschool live action series starring Tahliya Lowles, Ellis James-Naylor, Rufus Hound, James Merry, Andrea Valls, Angela Curran, Ruby O’Donnell and Kirsty Leigh Porter called Waffle The Wonder Dog was first shown on CBBC at (7:00am to 7:20am and 1:00pm to 1:20pm) and BBC One at (4:00am to 4:20am) from July 2007 to October 2009 before Waffle The Wonder Dog moved to CBeebies in 2010.
- 9 September – The BBC One Sunday morning political programme Sunday AM is renamed The Andrew Marr Show when it returns after its summer break.
- 3 December – Jay Hunt is confirmed as the next Controller of BBC One, replacing Peter Fincham. She will take up the role in early 2008.

=== 2008 ===
- 7 February – BBC One airs the debut episode of Ashes to Ashes, a spin-off series of Life on Mars.
- 8 February – After 22 years, Neighbours is shown on BBC One for the last time, the broadcast rights for the series having been bought by Five.
- 15 March – Launch of BBC One's I'd Do Anything, a search for actors to appear in the West End musical Oliver!. Three boys will be chosen to play Oliver Twist and an actress to play the role of Nancy.
- 31 May – Jodie Prenger will play the role of Nancy in the West End musical Oliver! after winning BBC One's I'd Do Anything.
- 15 September – BBC One airs the final episode of Grange Hill.
- 23 October – BBC One airs the 1000th edition of Question Time.
- 30 October – Friday Night With Jonathan Ross is taken off air following Jonathan Ross's three-month suspension from the BBC over his involvement in the Russell Brand Show prank telephone calls row.

=== 2009 ===
- 20 January – BBC One airs live coverage of the inauguration of Barack Obama as the 44th President of the United States.
- 23 January – Friday Night with Jonathan Ross returns after host Jonathan Ross finishes his 12-week suspension from the BBC.
- 5 April – BBC One moves its Countryfile programme to a 7 pm slot on Sunday evenings. The Sunday morning slot previously occupied by the show is taken over by a new outdoors activity show called Country Tracks.
- 28 May – BBC One airs Tourettes: I Swear I Can't Help It, a follow up documentary to the 1989 Q.E.D. film John's Not Mad, dealing with people who have Tourette syndrome.
- 1 October – London mayor Boris Johnson makes a cameo appearance in BBC One soap EastEnders. The episode is watched by 8 million viewers.
- 22 October – British National Party leader Nick Griffin makes a controversial first appearance on Question Time after being invited onto the show by the BBC. The edition attracts eight million viewers, twice the programme's usual audience. The programme also results in a large number of complaints to the BBC, while Griffin himself makes a formal complaint to the corporation for the way he believes he was treated on the show.
- 13 December – BBC One airs an interview Fern Britton recorded with Tony Blair as part of her Fern Britton Meets... series. During the programme, the former Prime Minister says that it would have been right to remove Iraqi president Saddam Hussein even without evidence he had weapons of mass destruction.

== 2010s ==
=== 2010 ===
- 19 February – BBC One soap EastEnders celebrates its 25th anniversary with a live episode. The episode, watched by 16.6 million viewers sees the culmination of the storyline concerning who killed the character Archie Mitchell (played by Larry Lamb), revealing that the deed was done by Stacey Slater (Lacey Turner).
- 13 April – BBC One airs the 500th episode of its hospital drama Holby City.
- 12 May – Junior Apprentice makes its debut on BBC One. The first episode sees Karren Brady succeed Margaret Mountford as a member of Lord Sugar's board room.
- 29 August – After 37 years long-running sitcom Last of the Summer Wine is aired on BBC One for the last time.
- 14 September – Jay Hunt announces she is leaving the post of Controller of BBC One to take up the role of chief creative officer at Channel 4.
- 16 September – BBC One airs a special edition of Question Time featuring David Miliband, Ed Miliband, Ed Balls, Andy Burnham and Diane Abbott—the five candidates in the forthcoming Labour Party leadership election.
- 15 October – BBC Three Controller Danny Cohen is named as the new Controller of BBC One, replacing Jay Hunt.
- 26 December – Upstairs, Downstairs returns after 35 years of absence moving from ITV to BBC One.

=== 2011 ===
- 16 February – BBC One airs a special hour-long episode of its daytime soap Doctors to celebrate the series 2000th episode.
- 29 April – The Royal Wedding of Prince William and Kate Middleton is shown on BBC One and ITV. Audiences of around 24.5 million watched in the UK alone.
- 6 June – The BBC announces that the national variations of BBC One Northern Ireland, BBC One Scotland and BBC One Wales will become available in high definition in 2012.
- 11 August – BBC One airs a special edition of the political discussion show Question Time following the recent outbreak of rioting.

=== 2012 ===
- 1 January – BBC One airs Adele Live at the Royal Albert Hall, a programme featuring highlights of a concert given by Adele on 21 September 2011 as part of the singer's Adele Live tour.
- 7 January – BBC One airs the first episode of Casualty filmed in at its purpose-built studios in Roath Lock, Cardiff, the series having been previously filmed in Bristol. The episode, "Duty of Care", is also the first to be broadcast in HD.
- 27 March – Anne Robinson presents the final edition of The Weakest Link on BBC One to concentrate on Watchdog.
- 6 April – The EastEnders Omnibus edition is moved to a late night Friday/early Saturday morning slot from Sunday afternoons.
- 24 June – 20.34 million watch the quarter-final match of Euro 2012 between England and Italy on BBC One, the highest number since the equivalent quarter final of Euro 2004. It briefly receives British television's highest audience for any programme for eight years until being overtaken the following month.
- 27 July–12 August – BBC One becomes the Olympic Channel. Apart from news, the channel's entire output is given over to live coverage of the 2012 Olympic Games.
- 21 December – CBBC and CBeebies both air on BBC One for the last time.
- 26 December – Jenni Falconer presents the National Lottery Wednesday Night Draw, which airs on BBC One for the last time.
- 28 December – Matt Johnson presents the National Lottery Friday Night Draw, which airs on BBC One for the final time.

=== 2013 ===
- 6 January – BBC One airs the last programme in its astronomy series The Sky at Night to be presented by Sir Patrick Moore, recorded shortly before his death in December 2012. He launched the series in 1957.
- 4 March – BBC One airs the 1000th edition of A Question of Sport.
- 17 April – BBC One airs the funeral of former Prime Minister Margaret Thatcher, who died on 8 April. The three-hour special is watched by an average 3.2 million viewers, peaking at 4.4 million.
- 23 April – Current Director of BBC One, Danny Cohen is appointed Director of BBC Television, taking up the position from 7 May.
- 6 July - A brand new pirate themed game show hosted by Gemma Hunt and Conor McNamara called Swashbuckle aired on CBBC at (7:00am to 7:25am and 3:00pm to 3:25pm) and BBC One at (5:00am to 5:25am) from [6 July 2013] to [13 October 2013] before Swashbuckle moved to CBeebies from 2014 to 2022.
- 4 August – Scottish actor Peter Capaldi is unveiled as the Twelfth Doctor in a BBC One special, Doctor Who Live: The Next Doctor.
- 8 October – BBC Director-General Tony Hall announces plans to launch a BBC One +1 channel, and offer a 30-day catch-up service on the iPlayer.
- 12 December – BBC One's Question Time is broadcast from South Africa to discuss the legacy of Nelson Mandela following his recent death.

=== 2014 ===
- 21 April – Debut of BBC One's three-part adaptation of Daphne Du Maurier's novel Jamaica Inn. The first episode attracts several hundred complaints from viewers because of its poor sound quality. The BBC later apologises, saying it could not adjust the sound while the episode was on air, but will do so for the remaining two instalments.
- 28 May – 243 viewers have complained to the BBC about the poor sound quality on the first episode of Irish detective series Quirke, which made its BBC One debut on 25 May. Writer Andrew Davies later tells RadioTimes.com that he watched the programme with the subtitles on after his wife told him she could not hear the dialogue.
- 23 June – The BBC announces the UK's largest ever political debate ahead of the referendum. 12,000 first time voters will gather at Glasgow's SSE Hydro for a BBC One debate on independence on 11 September.
- 10 July – An edition of BBC One's Question Time from Inverness, Scotland, is believed by its producers to be the first to feature a panel without any politicians.
- 19 July – As the country gears up for the 2014 Commonwealth Games, BBC One airs Live at Edinburgh Castle, a concert from Edinburgh Castle featuring artists such as Smokey Robinson, Kaiser Chiefs, Culture Club, Ella Henderson and Katherine Jenkins.
- 4 August – BBC One airs the Commonwealth Games closing ceremony which features a performance by Kylie Minogue. Overnight viewing figures released the following day indicate the event is watched by 6.8 million.
- 9 August – Tumble, a show featuring 10 celebrities who take part in gymnastics to win the votes of the public, debuts on BBC One.
- 13 August – The BBC confirms that BBC One Scotland will air a debate on Scottish independence featuring Alex Salmond and Alistair Darling on 25 August.
- 25 August – BBC One Scotland airs a second televised debate on Scottish independence, featuring Alex Salmond and Alistair Darling.
- 11 September – BBC One airs Scotland Decides: The Big, Big Debate in which 16 and 17-year-old first time voters are given the opportunity to quiz a Question Time-style panel of politicians about issues surrounding the Independence referendum.
- 16 September – BBC One airs a special edition of Crimewatch marking 30 years of the series.
- 23 September – The BBC Trust introduces a current affairs quota to safeguard news programming, stipulating that BBC One's peak time schedule must include a minimum of 40 hours of current affairs programming annually.
- 28 September – BBC One's Midlands news programme, Midlands Today, celebrates its 50th anniversary.
- 3 October – EastEnders executive producer Dominic Treadwell-Collins announces that the soap's omnibus edition will be axed from April 2015 due to declining audience figures. The final omnibus edition to air on BBC One is shown on Friday 24 April 2015.
- 21 October – BBC One airs the Panorama film To Walk Again, documenting a pioneering therapy that enabled a paralysed man to walk again by transplanting cells from his nasal cavity into his spinal cord.
- 16 November – BBC One airs a repeat of an edition of Countryfile first shown in August which includes an interview with Northern Ireland blacksmith Barney Devlin, who inspired Seamus Heaney's poem, The Forge. The piece is shown with subtitles, prompting nationalist and unionist politicians to accuse the BBC of being "patronising".
- 15 December – BBC Three's Don't Tell the Bride is to move to BBC One, it is announced. The programme had faced the axe if BBC Three is given the go ahead to move its content online.
- 26 December – Marvel Studios Cinematic Universe film series were debuted on BBC One with the critically acclaimed superhero film Marvel Studios' Avengers Assemble.
- 31 December – As part of its New Year's Eve celebration, BBC One airs Queen & Adam Lambert Rock Big Ben Live, a concert at Westminster's Central Hall featuring the surviving members of Queen and American vocalist Adam Lambert, the runner up on the 2009 season of American Idol.

=== 2015 ===
- 1 January – BBC One airs the final ever episode of Miranda Hart's self-titled sitcom, Miranda. Overnight viewing figures suggest it was watched by an audience of 7.3 million.
- 13 January – BBC One airs the 5000th episode of EastEnders.
- 17 February – BBC One airs the first of four EastEnders episodes to feature live inserts throughout its 30th anniversary week. The editions also feature actor Himesh Patel tweeting in character as Tamwar Masood during the show's live segment, a first for British television. Firefighters are called to a blaze at the set a few hours after the first of four episodes are aired, but damage is minimal and will not interrupt the show's filming schedule. The cause of the fire is later revealed to have been a rehearsal for a fireworks display to celebrate the anniversary.
- 20 February – BBC One airs a completely live episode of EastEnders to celebrate the show's 30th anniversary. A repeat of the first ever episode is also aired via the BBC Red Button.
- 8 March – BBC One airs the final episode of Waterloo Road.
- 3 April – BBC One airs Eurovision's Greatest Hits, a concert celebrating 60 years of the Eurovision Song Contest, which is watched by an average audience of 1.89 million (9.5%).
- 11 April – The first Women's Boat Race to be staged on the Tideway alongside the Men's race is aired on BBC One. The coverage is presented by Clare Balding, who chose to forego hosting the 2015 Grand National after the two events fell on the same day. Oxford beat Cambridge in both the Women's and Men's events.
- 3 May – BBC One airs The C-Word, a dramatisation of Lisa Lynch's book about her battle with breast cancer. The film is watched by a peak audience of 4.2 million.
- 25 June – After the Women's World Cup proves popular with viewers, and having increased BBC Three's viewership, the BBC switches coverage of England's 27 June quarter final match against Canada to BBC One.
- 1 July – BBC One airs England's semi-final Women's World Cup clash with Japan, which sees England exiting the contest. Overnight figures suggest it was watched by 1.7m viewers.
- 20 July – Rain during the first two days of the 2015 Open Championship requires the contest to be extended for an extra day, and BBC One to schedule an extra day of coverage at the eleventh hour.
- 1 August – BBC One airs the 2015 FA Women's Cup Final, the first FA Women's Cup Final to be held at Wembley. The match sees Chelsea beat Notts County 1–0.
- 27 August – BBC One is named channel of the year at the Edinburgh Television Festival annual awards.
- 5 November – BBC One's The One Show previews a snippet of Adele performing her new single "Hello" on the forthcoming television special Adele at the BBC.
- 13 November – Children in Need 2015 airs on BBC One, with Terry Wogan absent from the role as its presenter for the first time since its launch in 1980. Instead Dermot O'Leary steps in at the last minute after Wogan is advised to pull out following a back operation. By the following day the telethon has raised over £37m, beating the 2014 amount of £32.6m.
- 20 November – Adele at the BBC airs on BBC One, attracting 4.54m viewers (a 19.8% audience share).

=== 2016 ===
- 3 January – Debut of BBC One's adaptation of War & Peace, which is watched by an average audience of 6.3 million, peaking at 6.7 million.
- 19 January – BBC One controller Charlotte Moore is appointed to the newly created role of controller of BBC TV channels and iPlayer, while Kim Shillinglaw, current controller of BBC Two and BBC Four is to leave the BBC and her position abolished.
- 21 March – After the concluding two episodes of the BBC One thriller The Night Manager were posted online, producers of the series say they are working hard to remove the content.
- 25 June – BBC One airs the 1000th episode of Casualty. The episode sees the return of one of the original cast members when Cathy Shipton reprises her role as Lisa Duffin.
- 11 July – Red Rock, a soap made by Ireland's TV3 and set in and around a fictitious Dublin Garda station, makes its UK television debut on BBC One. The opening episode draws an audience of 1.1 million (an 18.6% audience share).
- 27 August – BBC One airs a feature-length-episode of Casualty to mark the show's 30th anniversary.
- 28 August – BBC One airs new episodes of Are You Being Served? and Porridge as part of its season celebrating 60 years of British sitcoms, while ITV airs the first episode of its series Victoria starring Jenna Coleman as Queen Victoria. Overnight viewing figures indicate that 5.4 million viewers saw Victoria, as opposed to 5 million for Are You Being Served? and 4.4 million for Porridge.
- 2 September – BBC One airs a one-off special of Goodnight Sweetheart and a prequel to Keeping Up Appearances as part of its 60th anniversary of comedy celebrations.
- 18 November – Children in Need 2016 is aired on BBC One. The fundraiser is the first to take place since the death of Sir Terry Wogan, and tributes are paid to him throughout the evening. The 2016 event raises a record £46.6m.
- 25 November – As part of a new contract between the BBC and Lottery operator Camelot Group, BBC One Controller Charlotte Moore announces that the Saturday evening National Lottery Draw will no longer air live on BBC One from 2017. The draw will be shown via BBC iPlayer only from 7 January.
- 9 December – BBC One airs the British television premiere of Adele in New York City, a concert recorded by Adele at New York's Radio City Music Hall for NBC in 2015.
- 27 December – Following the death of George Michael on Christmas Day, BBC One airs George Michael at the Palais Garnier, Paris, a concert given by the singer in 2012.
- 31 December – Gaby Roslin presents the final National Lottery Draw to air on BBC One.

=== 2017 ===
- 1 January – BBC One launches a new set of idents, replacing the circle idents that have been shown before programmes for a decade. The new idents feature the photography of Martin Parr, who has attempted to capture portraits of modern Britain. The idents received an overwhelmingly negative audience review.
- 7 January – Let It Shine makes its debut on BBC One.
- 20 January – BBC One and ITV provide live coverage of the inauguration of Donald Trump as the 45th President of the United States; BBC coverage of the event is presented by BBC World's Katty Kay, with ITV's coverage presented by Tom Bradby. Also, BBC News announces that Kay would co-present 100 Days covering Trump's first 100 days, however in the end the programme carries on indefinitely apart from a summer break in August.
- 7 February – Debut of The Moorside, a BBC One drama starring Sheridan Smith and telling the story of the Shannon Matthews case. The first episode is received positively by critics.
- 20 March – The final edition of Crimewatch is broadcast on BBC One. The programme ends as a monthly evening programme after nearly 33 years on air although it isn't until October that its cancellation is confirmed when it is announced that its daytime spin-off series Crimewatch Roadshow (now Crimewatch Live) would continue to air, but will also air more episodes per year.
- 16 May – Debut of Three Girls, a hard hitting three-part BBC One drama about the Rochdale child grooming scandal. The series is later cited as an influence on Darren Osborne's decision to commit the Finsbury Park attack in June. Osborne's trial in early 2018 is told that he watched the drama a few weeks before carrying out the attack, and became fixated by its subject matter.
- 4 June – The One Love Manchester concert airs live on BBC One and BBC Radio, starring Ariana Grande. Overnight viewing figures indicate it had a peak audience of 22.6 million, making it the most watched television event of 2017 to date.
- 12 July – BBC One Wales airs Sir Gareth Edwards at 70, a birthday tribute to Welsh rugby union player Gareth Edwards. The programme is presented by Gabby Logan in front of a celebrity audience.
- 16 July – Jodie Whittaker is announced as the Thirteenth Doctor, and the first woman to regularly play the role. The announcement is made on BBC One following the 2017 Wimbledon Men's Singles Final.
- 29 July – BBC One airs the series 31 finale of Casualty, an episode notable for being the first on British television to be shot in entirely one take using a single camera.
- 27 August – BBC One debuts Strike – The Cuckoo's Calling, the first in a new detective series, Strike, and based on the crime novels by J. K. Rowling.
- 21 October – BBC One airs the first episode of Gunpowder, a drama about the 1605 Gunpowder Plot. The episode attracts seven complaints to Ofcom because of violent scenes involving execution. In defence, the BBC says the scenes are "grounded in historical fact", and reflect events that were happening at the time.
- 29 October – Blue Planet II debuts on BBC One, where overnight figures suggest it is watched by an average 10.3 million viewers.
- 10 November – BBC One pulls the drama Agatha Christie's Ordeal by Innocence from the Christmas schedule after one of the stars, Ed Westwick was accused of rape. The BBC says the drama will not be broadcast "until these matters are resolved".
- 31 December – BBC One welcomes in 2018 with a concert by Nile Rodgers and Chic, celebrating their 40th anniversary. The show pauses at midnight for the Chimes of Big Ben and fireworks display.

=== 2018 ===
- 22 January – Following the announcement of their engagement, Princess Eugenie and her fiancé Jack Brooksbank give their first interview to BBC One's The One Show.
- 9 February – BBC One broadcasts the opening ceremony of the 2018 Winter Olympics from Pyeongchang, South Korea.
- 22 March – BBC One airs the first of two editions of the latest version of The Generation Game, which is presented by Mel and Sue.
- 21 April – BBC One airs The Queen's Birthday Party, a concert from London's Royal Albert Hall celebrating the 92nd birthday of Queen Elizabeth II.
- 6 July – BBC One airs a special episode of EastEnders featuring the funeral of knife crime victim Shakil Kazemi (played by Shaheen Jafargholi) in which real-life knife crime stories are also included, with parents of victims speaking about their loved ones.
- 15 July – BBC One shows the first trailer for series 11 of Doctor Who in half-time during the World Cup Final.
- 2 September – BBC One's The Andrew Marr Show moves to the later timeslot of 10:00 am as part of a shake up of the channel's Sunday morning schedule.
- 28 September – BBC One airs a special edition of Bargain Hunt recorded for BBC Music Day featuring members of the bands Happy Mondays and Pulp. It is reported that the end of the programme had to be re-recorded after it was discovered one of the participants had broken the rules.
- 2 October – As part of plans to revamp its daytime schedule BBC One announces that Flog It! will be axed after seventeen years.
- 1 November – Ariana Grande at the BBC airs on BBC One. The one-hour special sees Ariana Grande talking to Davina McCall about her life and career, as well as performing some of her tracks.
- 15 November – The BBC announces that the 2018 Doctor Who Christmas special will air on New Year's Day 2019, the first time the Christmas special has not aired on Christmas Day since the series returned to television screens in 2005.
- 16 November – Children in Need 2018 is aired on BBC television, with £50.6m donated during the course of its broadcast. This brings the collective total raised by Children in Need to £1bn.
- 7 December – Fiona Bruce is confirmed as David Dimbleby's successor as presenter of Question Time.
- 9 December – As BBC One airs the concluding episode of series 11 of Doctor Who, series showrunner Chris Chibnall confirms that series 12 will air in 2020, and that Jodie Whittaker will once again star.
- 13 December – After 25 years, David Dimbleby presents his final edition of Question Time.
- 28 December – The BBC confirms that its long-running film review series The Film Programme will not return for a new series in 2019.

=== 2019 ===
- 1 January – BBC One airs the seasonal Doctor Who episode "Resolution", the first time an episode of the series has been aired as a New Year's Day rather than a Christmas Day special.
- 10 January – Fiona Bruce presents her first edition of Question Time.
- 2 March – BBC One airs the first of two special Casualty/Holby City crossover episodes featuring a storyline involving characters from both series. The story concerns a cyber attack on Holby City Hospital. Part One of the story appears in the evening's episode of Casualty, with Part Two appearing in the 5 March episode of Holby City.
- 4 March – The Monday to Thursday editions of BBC News at Ten are cut from 45 minutes to 35 minutes. The reduction affects editions of the national and local news bulletins airing in that timeslot, as well as the post-bulletin weather forecast, and is done in order to make way for a new BBC Three strand of programming, as well as avoiding a clash with the start of BBC Two's Newsnight, which begins at 10.30pm. The BBC Three strand will run from Mondays to Wednesdays at 10:35 pm, with Question Time continuing to air after the news on Thursdays.
- 18 April – David Attenborough presents the BBC One documentary Climate Change – The Facts, which explores the science of climate change and possible solutions to counteract it. The film wins general praise from critics for highlighting the dangers that could be presented by not doing enough to tackle climate change.
- 10 May – BBC One pulls the day's scheduled edition of Have I Got News for You due to confirmation a few days earlier that UK voting in the 2019 European Parliament election will go ahead, which conflicted with the booking of Change UK MP Heidi Allen as one of the panelists.
- 19 May – BBC One airs the documentary Royal Team Talk in which the Duke of Cambridge takes part in a discussion about men's mental health issues with several notable sportsmen, including Thierry Henry, Gareth Southgate and Peter Crouch.
- 18 July – BBC One broadcasts the final edition of This Week after sixteen years on air. A special live audience edition of the programme marks its finale.
- 8 December – BBC One airs a television adaptation of Emma Healey's novel, Elizabeth Is Missing, a drama featuring Glenda Jackson in her first television acting appearance for 25 years.

== 2020s ==
=== 2020 ===
- 21 February – The BBC announces that its consumer affairs programme Watchdog will be subsumed into The One Show from Spring 2020.
- 2 March – As cases of Coronavirus in the UK continue to increase, a BBC One programme Coronavirus: Everything You Need to Know addresses questions from the public on the outbreak.
- 19 April – BBC One airs highlights of the Together at Home concert, a global benefit concert staged to celebrate healthcare workers and featuring musicians playing from home. The line-up includes Paul McCartney, Lady Gaga, Billie Eilish and The Rolling Stones. This UK version of the concert also features the stories of frontline workers, as well as extra footage of British artists such as Paul McCartney, Elton John and Ellie Goulding. The coverage is presented by Claudia Winkleman, Dermot O'Leary and Clara Amfo.
- 23 April – BBC One airs The Big Night In, a first-of-its-kind joint broadcast with Children in Need and Comic Relief, and featuring an evening of music and entertainment. The broadcast celebrates the acts of kindness, humour and the spirit of hope and resilience that is keeping the nation going during the unprecedented Coronavirus pandemic, with viewers given a chance to donate to a fund helping local charities and projects around the country. On the night the event raises £27m for charity, with the government pledging to double that amount.
- 1 May – BBC One introduces a set of new idents reflecting social distancing.
- 2 May – An episode of Casualty that details a (real-life) viral outbreak is pulled from BBC One's schedule after being deemed as inappropriate. The broadcast is replaced by the next episode in the series, with a recap of the skipped episode being shown beforehand.
- 31 July – The delayed 2020 British Academy Television Awards are held as a virtual ceremony and aired live on BBC One.
- 26 October – BBC One launches a "topical live series" that airs at 9:15 am on weekdays. Called Morning Live, airing on weekdays at 9.15am, the programme is designed to connect with viewers' real-life concerns and to offer trustworthy and expert advice. Morning Live was initially commissioned to run for 40 episodes, until Christmas, but soon became a permanent part of BBC One's morning schedule.

=== 2021 ===
- 9 April – BBC One interrupts the daytime programme Paramedics on Scene following the death of Prince Philip, which is announced at midday and simulcasts a BBC News special, which is also shown on BBC Two and BBC Parliament. BBC One continues to simulcast the BBC News Channel until 2pm the following day. Programmes are then cancelled in favour of ongoing news coverage of unfolding events and special programmes paying tribute to the Prince. The programmes to be pulled from the day's schedule are Bargain Hunt, !mpossible, Money for Nothing, Escape to the Country, Ready Steady Cook, The Repair Shop, Pointless, The One Show, A Question of Sport, EastEnders, the MasterChef final, the season premiere of Have I Got News for You, The Graham Norton Show and the film War of the Worlds. Within six hours of the death being announced, the BBC has received so many viewer complaints about its continuous coverage that it establishes a dedicated form to deal with complaints about the schedule changes. Viewer ratings also fall, with the BBC One audience down by 6% in comparison with the same day the previous week.
- 18 July – The "social distancing" idents are discontinued, following England lifting most of its coronavirus restrictions, and the normal Oneness idents are reintroduced the following day on 19 July.

BBC One logo used since 2021.

- 20 October – BBC introduces its new logo, being a modification of a previous one used since 1997. BBC One also received a new logo for the first time since 2006, reverting the change of typesetting of "One" in it. "One" is set below the BBC logo, just like it was in 2002 logo. In line with BBC's other domestic services, it is no longer seen in boxed form, and its red colour tonation is lighter.
- 19 December – After more than 16 years, Andrew Marr presents BBC One's Sunday morning political talk show for the final time. Most recently titled The Andrew Marr Show, the programme ends following Andrew's decision to leave the BBC.

=== 2022 ===
- 26 January – A new regional programme for England launches. Called We Are England, the programme chooses a subject and produces six editions tailored for six different pan-regional areas of England. The series replaces Inside Out which ended last year.
- 21 February – The BBC One magazine programme Morning Live moves to studios in Manchester as part of the BBC's drive to produce more content outside London.
- 29 March – Medical drama Holby City airs its final episode after 23 years.
- 1 April – BBC One launches a new set of idents, replacing the previous set. Each ident features a large community space, being utilised for a variety of different purposes. The idents present these spaces by slowly rotating around the image, with a circular, lens effect showing parts of the space being used for different events, during different times of day, and in different configurations.
- 2 June – The Prince of Wales and Duchess of Cornwall make a guest appearance in an episode of EastEnders when they join residents celebrating the Platinum Jubilee of Elizabeth II.
- 4 June – BBC One airs the Platinum Party at the Palace to celebrate the Platinum Jubilee of Elizabeth II. Acts on the bill include Diana Ross, Queen and Adam Lambert, Duran Duran and Sir Rod Stewart.
- 27 June – For the first time since 1983, the BBC schedules live evening coverage of Wimbledon on BBC One to try to reduce the disruption caused to the BBC's schedules due to last moment decisions to transfer live coverage from BBC Two to BBC One.
- 13 July – Dedicated evening continuity for BBC One viewers in Northern England launches but it is not accompanied by any additional north-specific programming and there is no special on-screen BBC North branding.
- 4 September – Launch of the politics programme Sunday with Laura Kuenssberg on BBC One. Guests on the opening edition include Conservative leadership candidates Rishi Sunak and Liz Truss, as well as First Lady of Ukraine Olena Zelenska.
- 8–19 September – Most of BBC One's output is given over to provide live coverage of the Death and state funeral of Elizabeth II. Some shows during the evening are broadcast as originally scheduled and BBC One's pre-recorded daytime programmes during this period are shown on BBC Two.

=== 2023 ===
- 22 March and 26 April – The roll-out of regional BBC One takes place, in two parts. The BBC will then close its SD versions on satellite.
- 6 May – BBC One airs full coverage of the coronation of Charles III and Camilla. Overnight viewing figures indicate it to have had a collective audience of 18 million, peaking at 20.4 million at the moment the King was crowned with 12.03 million people watching BBC One's coverage, with a peak BBC One audience of 13.4 million.
- 7 May – BBC One broadcasts the concert and lightshow from Windsor Castle to celebrate the coronation.
- 20 August – BBC One broadcasts the 2023 FIFA Women's World Cup final which sees England defeated by Spain 1–0. Overnight viewing figures indicate the match to have had a peak audience of 12 million, with 3.9 million watching online.
- 20 October – The BBC axes its Match of the Day spin-off programme, MOTDx, after four years on air.

=== 2024 ===
- 2 January – BBC Breakfast and Morning Live's running times are extended. BBC Breakfast runs until 9.30 with Morning Live airtime extended to 75 minutes, giving that programme a transmission slot of 9:30am to 10:45am.
- 8 January – BBC ceases broadcasting on SD Satelitte at 10:54am. BBC1, BBC2, BBC3, BBC4, BBC NEWS, CBBC, CBeebies & BBC Scotland & BBC Alba. Freeview is not affected.
- 13 January – Gladiators is revived by the BBC, airing on BBC One during Saturday evening primetime. The programme, originally broadcast by ITV, was last seen on Sky One in 2009.
- 14 November – Continuing drama Doctors broadcasts its final ever episode after 24 years on air. This means that, for the first time since launching a full daytime schedule in 1986, a continuing drama/soap no longer forms part of the channel's daytime output.

=== 2026 ===
- 24 May – Football Focus ends after 52 years. The final edition is shown at the end of the 2025–26 football season.
- 15 August – BBC Sport's football scores and results programme Final Score's airtime on BBC One is expanded, now staring each week at 3.45pm, instead of 4.30pm. The programme now airs on BBC One Scotland as BBC Scotland's bespoke results coverage does not return for the 2026/27 season.
- 20 September – BBC Breakfast is aired for the final time on Sundays. It is replaced the following Sunday by a simulcast of the BBC News Channel.

== See also ==
- Timeline of the BBC Television Service
- Timeline of BBC Two
- Timeline of non-flagship BBC television channels
- Timeline of RTÉ Television
