= Timeline of the BBC Television Service =

This is a timeline of the history of the BBC Television Service, from events preceding its launch in 1936 until its renaming as BBC1 in 1964 upon the launch of BBC2.

== 1920s ==
- 1929
  - November – The BBC and John Logie Baird begin daily experimental broadcasting of 30-line television transmissions using the BBC's 2LO transmitter.

== 1930s ==
- 1930
  - 14 July – First television drama broadcast, a production of Luigi Pirandello's The Man With the Flower in His Mouth by the BBC from Baird's studios at 133 Long Acre, London, directed by Val Gielgud.
- 1931
  - No events.
- 1932
  - 2 August – The BBC starts a regular television service, using John Logie Baird's 30-line system.
- 1933
  - 21 April – The first television revue, Looking In, is shown on the BBC. The first four minutes of this programme survive on a Silvatone record, an early method of home video recording.
  - September – BBC Television Policy, Rumours and Facts is published.
- 1934
  - 8 January – Radio Times lists this date as the first on which a television programme is broadcast by the BBC. The 30-minute programme, titled Television: By the Baird Process, airs at 11pm.
  - 31 March – The agreement for joint experimental transmissions by the BBC and John Logie Baird's company comes to an end.
- 1935
  - 11 September – Final transmission of John Logie Baird's 30-line television system by the BBC. The BBC begins preparations for a regular high definition broadcasting service from Alexandra Palace.
- 1936
  - 2 November – The first regular high-definition (then defined as at least 200 lines) BBC Television Service, based at Alexandra Palace in London, officially begins broadcasting (after test transmissions began in August). The service alternates on a weekly basis between Baird's 240-line mechanical system and the Marconi-EMI's 405-line all-electronic system. Programmes are broadcast daily, Monday to Saturday, at 3pm–4pm and 9pm–10pm.
- 1937
  - 6 February – The BBC Television Service drops the Baird system in favour of the Marconi-EMI 405 lines system.
  - 24 April – The first children's television show For the Children airs.
  - 12 May – The BBC use their outside broadcast unit for the first time to televise the coronation of King George VI and Queen Elizabeth. A fragment of this broadcast is one of the earliest surviving examples of British television, filmed off-screen at home by an engineer with an 8 mm cine camera. A short section of this footage was used in a programme during the week of the 1953 coronation of Queen Elizabeth II and this latter event survives in the BBC's archives.
  - 14 May – The BBC Television Service airs a thirty-minute excerpt of Twelfth Night, the first known instance of a Shakespeare play on television. Among the cast is Greer Garson. Peggy Ashcroft appeared in a 1939 telecast of the entire play.
  - 18 June – The Agatha Christie play Wasp's Nest airs, the only instance of her adapting one of her works for television, a medium she later came to dislike.
  - 21 June – The Wimbledon Championships (tennis) is first shown on the BBC Television Service.
  - 16 September – Football is televised for the first time. It is a specially-arranged friendly match between Arsenal and Arsenal Reserves at Highbury.
  - 11 November – The BBC Television Service airs an adaptation of the Great War-set play Journey's End by R. C. Sherriff, starring Reginald Tate as Stanhope. Shown in commemoration of Armistice Day, it is the first time that a whole evening's programming has been given over to a single play.
- 1938
  - 21 February – The BBC Television Service airs the first ever piece of television science-fiction, a 35-minute adaptation of a segment of the play R.U.R. by the Czech playwright Karel Čapek.
  - 12 March – The first news bulletin aired by the BBC Television Service, in sound only. Previously, the service had aired British Movietone News cinema newsreels.
  - 1 April – The Oxford and Cambridge Boat Race is first televised on the BBC Television Service.
  - 19 April – The first televised football match, England v Scotland, is shown on the BBC Television Service.
  - 30 April – The FA Cup Final is televised for the first time on the BBC Television Service.
  - 14 May – The first quiz show, Spelling Bee, is televised on the BBC Television Service.
  - 24 June – Test match Cricket airs for the first time on the BBC Television Service, with coverage of the second test of The Ashes series between England and Australia, live from Lord's Cricket Ground.
- 1939
  - 4 March – The BBC Television Service airs one of the first plays to be written especially for television, Condemned To Be Shot by R. E. J. Brooke. The production is notable for the use of a camera as the first-person perspective of the play's unseen central character.
  - 27 March – The BBC Television Service airs the entirety of Magyar Melody live from His Majesty's Theatre. The 175-minute broadcast is the first showing of a full-length musical on television.
  - 20 July – The Shaw play The Man of Destiny is shown on the BBC Television Service.
  - 1 September – The anticipated outbreak of war brings television broadcasting at the BBC Television Service to an end at 12:35pm, after the airing of a Mickey Mouse cartoon, Mickey's Gala Premiere and various sound and vision test signals. It is feared that the VHF waves of television would act as a perfect homing signal for guiding enemy bombers to central London: in any case, the engineers of the television service would be needed for the war effort, particularly for radar. The BBC Television Service would resume broadcasting, with the same Mickey Mouse cartoon, a year after the war ends in 1946.

== 1940s ==
- 1940 to 1945
  - The service is closed for the duration of World War II.
- 1946
  - 7 June – The BBC Television Service begins broadcasting again. The first words heard are "Good afternoon everybody. How are you? Do you remember me, Jasmine Bligh?". The Mickey Mouse cartoon Mickey's Gala Premiere that had been the last programme transmitted seven years earlier at the start of World War II, is reshown after Bligh's introduction.
  - June – BBC Wimbledon, the longest-running pre-war programme since it debuted in 1927, returns.
  - 7 July – The BBC's children's programme For the Children returns, one of the few pre-war programmes to resume after the resumption of the BBC Television Service.
  - 4 August – Children's puppet Muffin the Mule makes his debut in an episode of For the Children. He becomes so popular, he is given his own show later in the year.
  - 22 October – Telecrime, the first television crime series from the 1930s, returns for the final run on the BBC Television Service, retitled Telecrimes.
  - October – The first live televised football match is broadcast from Barnet's home ground Underhill. Twenty minutes of the first half of the game against Wealdstone was televised and thirty-five minutes of the second half was shown before it became too dark to continue with the coverage.
  - 29 November – Pinwright's Progress, British television's first sitcom, makes its debut on the BBC Television Service.
- 1947
  - 10 February–11 March – The BBC Television Service is temporarily suspended for the first time since World War II due to a national fuel crisis.
  - 11 March – The BBC Television Service resumes broadcasting.
  - 9 November – The memorial service broadcast from the Cenotaph airs on the BBC Television Service, using tele-recording for the first time.
  - 20 November – The Princess Elizabeth (later Elizabeth II), daughter of George VI marries The Duke of Edinburgh at Westminster Abbey, London. The service is watched by an estimated 400,000 viewers and is the oldest surviving telerecorded programme in Britain.
  - Adelaide Hall appearing in Variety in Sepia, the first telecording by BBC (kinescope) showing the singer performing two songs with a chorus and her guitar. Copies of this first English kinescope of live TV broadcasting are preserved by the BBC.
  - Café Continental makes its debut on the BBC Television Service.
- 1948
  - 5 January – Television Newsreel is first shown on the BBC Television Service.
  - 29 July – The BBC Television Service begins its coverage of the Olympic Games in London by broadcasting the opening ceremony. From that day until the closing ceremony on 14 August, they will broadcast an average of three and a half hours a day of live coverage of the Games, using a special coaxial cable linking the main venue at Wembley Stadium to their base at Alexandra Palace. This is the most ambitious sustained outside broadcast attempted yet by the BBC, but passes off with no serious problems.
- 1949
  - July – The BBC Television Service revives the regular televised weather forecast.
  - 29 September – The BBC Television Service first airs Come Dancing, a TV ballroom dancing competition show which would run until 1998.
  - 26 October – How Do You View?, the first comedy series on British television, starring Terry-Thomas, first airs.
  - 17 December – The Sutton Coldfield television transmitter is opened in the Midlands, making it the first part of the UK outside of London to receive the BBC Television Service.

== 1950s ==
- 1950
  - 23 February – The first televised report of the General Election results in the UK.
  - 3 April – The BBC's aspect ratio changes from 5:4 to 4:3.
  - 21 May – The BBC's Lime Grove television studios open.
  - 11 July – Andy Pandy makes its debut on the BBC Television Service.
  - 27 August – The first ever live television pictures from across the English Channel are transmitted by the BBC Television Service. The two-hour programme is broadcast live from Calais in northern France to mark the centenary of the first message sent by submarine telegraph cable from England to France.
  - 30 September – The first BBC Television Service broadcast from an aircraft.
- 1951
  - 16 July – What's My Line? makes its debut on the BBC Television Service. It will be one of the top-rated programmes for the rest of the decade and makes a star of its host, Eamonn Andrews who takes over from Gilbert Harding from the second episode.
  - 12 October – The Holme Moss transmitter is opened in Northern England, making the BBC Television Service available to the region for the first time.
- 1952
  - 16 January – Sooty, Harry Corbett's glove puppet bear, first appears on the BBC Television Service.
  - 15 February – The funeral of King George VI is televised in the UK.
  - 14 March – The BBC Television Service is launched in Scotland.
  - 20 July – Arrow to the Heart, the first collaboration between director Rudolph Cartier and scriptwriter Nigel Kneale, airs on the BBC Television Service.
  - 15 December – Bill and Ben, The Flower Pot Men makes its debut on the BBC Television Service.
  - December – For the Children airs for the final time.
- 1953
  - 17 March – Patrick Troughton becomes television's first Robin Hood, playing the eponymous folk hero in the first of six half-hour episodes of Robin Hood, shown weekly until 21 April on the BBC Television Service.
  - 1 May – The BBC brings into service television transmitters at Pontop Pike (County Durham) and Glencairn (Belfast) to improve coverage prior to the Coronation broadcast.
  - 2 June – The Coronation of Queen Elizabeth II is televised in the UK on the BBC Television Service. Sales of TV sets rise sharply in the weeks leading up to the event. It is also one of the earliest broadcasts to be deliberately recorded for posterity and still exists in its entirety to this day.
  - 18 July – The Quatermass Experiment, the first of the famous Quatermass science-fiction serials by Nigel Kneale, begins its run on the BBC Television Service.
  - 20 July – The Good Old Days begins on the BBC Television Service, it would run until 1983.
  - 11 November – The current affairs series Panorama launches on the BBC Television Service. It is now the longest-running programme in British television history.
  - 2 December – The BBC airs its 'Television Symbol' for the first time, the first animated television presentation symbol in the world. Known as the 'bat's wings' by logo enthusiasts, it would remain in use until 1960.
  - Peter Scott presents the first BBC television natural history broadcast, from his home at Slimbridge.
- 1954
  - 11 January – The first weather forecast with an in-vision presenter is televised in the UK. The first weather presenter was George Cowling.
  - 9 April – The Grove Family, generally considered to be the first British TV soap opera, makes its debut on the BBC Television Service.
  - 5 July – The first actual news bulletin, News and Newsreel, aired on the BBC Television Service, replacing Television Newsreel.
  - 12 December – The BBC Television Service airs its famous and controversial adaptation of George Orwell's Nineteen Eighty-Four.
  - 30 December – The first BBC Sports Personality of the Year ceremony is presented from London's Savoy Hotel. It has aired annually ever since.
- 1955
  - 2 January – Annette Mills who hosted Muffin the Mule makes her last appearance on television.
  - 10 January – Annette Mills dies from a heart attack after an operation. Following her death, Muffin the Mule is dropped by the BBC Television Service.
  - 15 January
    - The Benny Hill Show makes its debut on the BBC Television Service, later moving to ITV (which launched that September). Its global audience figures will be counted in the billions.
    - The BBC airs Heinz Sielmann's pioneering nature documentary Zimmerleute des Waldes as Woodpecker at the behest of David Attenborough and presented by Peter Scott, it is repeated several times during the year.
  - 17 May – Sir Anthony Eden hosts a groundbreaking television election programme for the Conservative Party, the first broadcast of its type. The 30-minute programme features government ministers pitted against newspaper editors.
  - 29 June – Life with the Lyons, one of the first successful British sitcoms (though starring the American Ben Lyon), makes its debut on the BBC Television Service, having previously been broadcast only on radio.
  - 9 July – Dixon of Dock Green makes its debut on the BBC Television Service.
  - 21 July – The BBC brings into service its Divis transmitting station, its first permanent 405-line VHF Band I facility serving Northern Ireland, marking the launch of a television service for Northern Ireland, the 35kW transmissions can also be readily received in much of the Republic of Ireland.
  - 29 July – This Is Your Life makes its debut on the BBC Television Service.
  - 4 September – Newsreaders appear "in vision" for the first time.
  - 22 October – The Quatermass II sequel to 1953's The Quatermass Experiment, airs on the BBC Television Service. It ends on 26 November.
  - 25 December – After being on the radio since 1932, the Royal Christmas Message is broadcast on television for the first time, in sound only at 3pm. The first visual Christmas message is shown in 1957.
- 1956
  - 6 July – Hancock's Half Hour makes its debut on the BBC Television Service.
- 1957
  - 16 February – The "Toddlers' Truce" (an arrangement whereby there were no television broadcasts between 6pm and 7pm, to allow parents to put their children to bed!) is abolished.
  - 21 April – Historical documentary series Men, Women and Clothes begins airing. It is the first BBC programme filmed in colour, although it can only be transmitted in black and white.
  - 24 April – The Sky at Night airs for the first time, presented by Patrick Moore. He would present the programme until his death in December 2012.
  - 24 September – The BBC begins broadcasting programmes for schools.
  - 3 December – Face to Face makes its debut on the BBC Television Service.
  - 25 December – The Royal Christmas Message is televised for the first time.
- 1958
  - 14 April — The magnetic videotape machine Vision Electronic Recording Apparatus or VERA for short, is given a live demonstration on air on Panorama where Richard Dimbleby seated by a clock, talks for a couple of minutes about the new method of vision recording with an instant playback. The tape is then wound back and replayed. The picture is slightly watery, but reasonably watchable and instant playback is something completely new.
  - 16 October – Blue Peter, the world's longest-running children's TV programme, makes its debut on the BBC Television Service. It continues to air to this day.
  - 28 October – The State Opening of Parliament is broadcast on television for the first time.
- 1959
  - 1 January – The first broadcast of the Vienna New Year's Concert from Austria airs on the BBC Television Service.
  - 1 June – Juke Box Jury makes its debut on the BBC Television Service.

== 1960s ==
- 1960
  - 26 March – The Grand National is televised for the first time by the BBC Television Service.
  - 20 June – Nan Winton becomes the first female newsreader on the BBC Television Service.
  - 29 June – The BBC Television Centre is opened in London.
  - 13 July – The Pilkington Committee on Broadcasting is established to consider the future of broadcasting. Their report, published in 1962, criticises the populism of ITV and recommends that Britain's third national television channel (after the BBC Television Service and ITV) should be awarded to the BBC.
  - 19 September – BBC Schools starts using the Pie Chart ident.
  - 8 October – The BBC Television Service is renamed as BBC TV.
- 1961
  - 1 October – Songs of Praise, a programme featuring Christian congregations singing hymns, makes its debut on BBC TV, the first edition being hosted by Tabernacle Chapel, Cardiff. The series would still be on the air more than 60 years later.
  - 2 October – Points of View, a programme featuring the letters of viewers offering praise, criticism and comments on television of recent weeks, makes its debut on BBC TV. The series would still be on the air more than 60 years later.
  - 15 December – The BBC airs the first Comedy Playhouse. The series features a variety of one-off unrelated sitcoms. Over the next 14 years, it would air the pilot episodes of many popular comedies, including Steptoe and Son, Till Death Us Do Part, Up Pompeii!, The Liver Birds, Are You Being Served? and Last of the Summer Wine, the latter of which would run until 2010.
- 1962
  - 2 January – Z-Cars makes its debut on BBC TV, noted as a realistic portrayal of the police. The series would run until 1978.
  - 17 April – Brothers in Law makes its debut on BBC TV.
  - 14 June – BBC TV airs the first episode of the sitcom Steptoe and Son, written by Galton and Simpson.
  - 24 November – The first episode of the influential satire show That Was the Week That Was airs on BBC TV.
- 1963
  - 13 January – BBC TV airs the play The Madhouse on Castle Street in the Sunday-Night Theatre strand. The play co-stars a young American folk music singer named Bob Dylan.
  - 30 September – BBC TV begins using a globe as their ident. They would continue to use it in varying forms until 2002.
  - 22 November – At 7.05pm, between Points of View and Tonight, BBC TV makes a newsflash about the shooting of American president John F. Kennedy. Tonight was later interrupted at 7.26pm for another newsflash, which later announced the death of the American president. For the next nineteen minutes, viewers got the revolving globe ident, punctuated by four brief bulletins. BBC TV then resumed normal programming at 7.50pm with Here's Harry, a sitcom starring comedian Harry Worth, and Dr. Finlay's Casebook, both airing five minutes later than scheduled due to two other newsflashes. The latter programme was interrupted for a minute by a graphic and a special announcement at 8.59pm, leading to the news bulletin following it being shown nine minutes later than scheduled. This replaced American sitcom The Dick Van Dyke Show. Britten at Fifty, a programme celebrating the fifty birthday of musician Benjamin Britten airs in its scheduled time slot, although Top in Television, the name of the show covering the 1963 Society of Film and Television Arts Television Awards was dropped, to be replaced by a special announcement, a performance from Vienna soloists, and a tribute programme to the late president, presented by Ian Trethowan, which included tributes by Prime Minister Alec Douglas-Home, opposition leader Harold Wilson and Jo Grimond, who was leading the Liberal Party. Instead of closing down at 11.25pm, a delayed News Extra (originally due to air at 11.10pm) aired instead. BBC TV eventually ended its programming at midnight. The decision to show both Here's Harry and Dr. Finlay's Casebook turned up to be controversial, as the BBC would receive over 2,000 phone calls and almost 500 letters and telegrams criticising the choice. The newsflashes were presented by stand-in John Roberts, because regular newscasters Richard Baker, Robert Dougall and Kenneth Kendall were at the annual dinner and ball of the Guild of Television Producers and Directors.
  - 23 November
    - That Was the Week That Was airs its non-satirical Kennedy tribute episode on BBC TV.
    - Doctor Who makes its debut on BBC TV with the first episode of the four-part serial An Unearthly Child. The First Doctor is portrayed by William Hartnell. The original series would air until 1989 and would be revived in 2005.
  - 28 December – The satirical show That Was the Week That Was (TW3) airs for the last time.
- 1964
  - 1 January – The first edition of the music show Top of the Pops airs on BBC TV.
  - 4 January – Test transmissions begin for BBC2.
  - 9 February – Launch of BBC Wales TV.
  - 20 April – BBC2 starts broadcasting and the existing BBC TV channel is renamed BBC1.

== See also ==
- Timeline of BBC One
- Timeline of BBC Two
- Timeline of non-flagship BBC television channels
- Timeline of RTÉ Television
