= Richard Klein (television executive) =

British television executive (born 1958)

- Born: Richard Henry Klein; 12 October 1958 (age 67); Burwash Common, Sussex, England, UK
- Education: University of Aberdeen; City University London
- Occupation: Television executive
- Title: Controller of BBC Four (2008–2014)
- Children: 1

Richard Henry Klein (born 12 October 1958) is a British television executive who was the former controller of BBC Four. He became controller in 2008, taking over from Janice Hadlow, who became Controller of BBC Two.

== Early life ==
He was born in Burwash Common in Sussex (now in East Sussex) to Hans Klein and Bernadine Thorne. He attended Prior Park College, a Roman Catholic independent school near Bath in Somerset.

From the University of Aberdeen he gained an MA in English in 1983, and from City University London, he gained a Diploma of Journalism in 1985.

== Career ==
He was a director on Weekend World on LWT from 1987 to 1990.

=== BBC ===
He joined the BBC in 1996 as a current affairs producer director, having worked as a freelancer for some years before. From 2005 to 2007 he was a commissioning editor for documentaries; most output of BBC Four comprises documentaries. He was succeeded by Charlotte Moore. From 2007 to 2008, he was Head of Independent Commissioning for Factual TV, of the BBC.

He became Controller of BBC Four in December 2008. In November 2009, his salary was revealed by the BBC to be £195,000.

=== ITV ===
Following his departure from BBC Four, he was Head of Factual commissioning for ITV and later joined the executive board of the independent production company Plimsoll Productions.

Media offices
Preceded by Janice Hadlow	Controller of BBC Four; 2008–2014	Succeeded by Kim Shillinglaw
