= Kim Shillinglaw =

British media executive (born 1969)

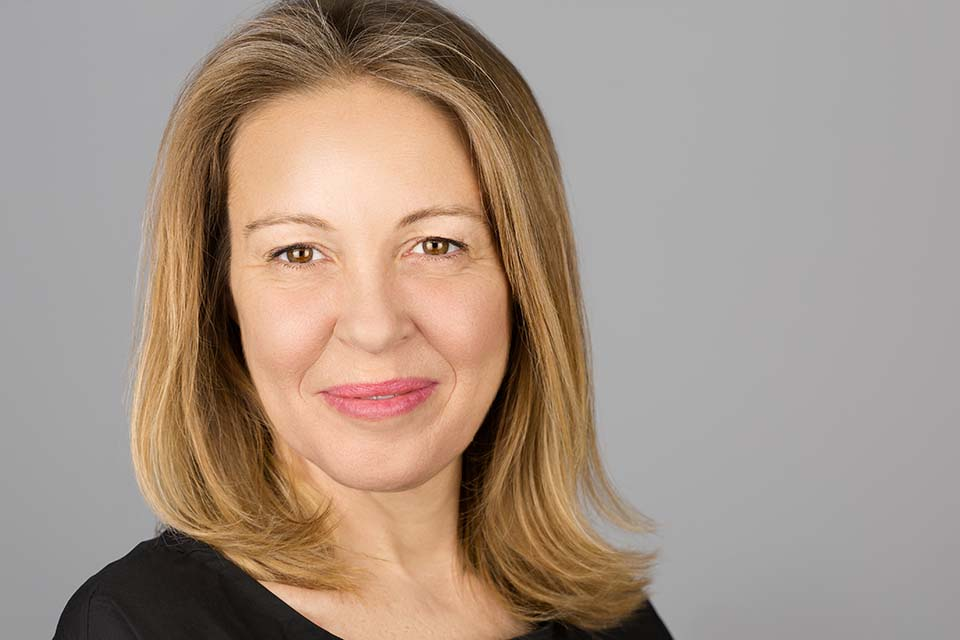
Shillinglaw in 2018

Kim Danila Shillinglaw (born 1969) is a British media executive and non-executive director. A former controller of BBC Two and BBC Four, head of science and natural history commissioning at the BBC, and commissioner for children's entertainment at CBBC, she later became director of factual businesses at Endemol Shine. She is known for having transformed popular science on television.

== Early life and career ==
Born in London, Shillinglaw spent her early years in Cameroon and Spain, countries in which her parents worked during the 1970s.

After her family's return to Britain, she attended Holland Park Comprehensive and then read history at Wadham College, Oxford. After her graduation, she worked in strategy and the music industry then joined Observer Films (for a time part of the Guardian Media Group) as a researcher, eventually becoming a series producer. Following this, she worked for ITV and Channel 4.

== Early BBC posts ==
From 2006, Shillinglaw worked as an executive producer for BBC Factual and the commissioner of independent productions for CBBC. Among shows that she developed and commissioned at CBBC was the Horrible Histories series. Shillinglaw was responsible for changing the original pitch, a long-form drama idea about a ghost train, into a comedy proposal based on sketches with contemporary references to popular culture. She also requested the recruitment of adult comedy writers. Working under Karen O'Connor from late 2007, she then became one of 10 "creative leads" in London Factual and Executive Produced the Bafta-nominated Chemistry: A Volatile History with Jim Al Khalili, Blood and Guts with Michael Mosley and The Incredible Human Journey with Alice Roberts.

== Science and Natural History ==
In 2009, Shillinglaw was promoted the BBC's commissioning editor and head of commissioning for science and natural history, responsible around 2012 for 200 hours of programming per year. She increased the number of natural history hours produced by the BBC, including new landmarks Frozen Planet, Africa, Hidden Kingdoms, Dynasties and The Hunt (2015 TV series). She turned the Planets programmes into a returning brand with Planet Earth II and Blue Planet II (originally known as Oceans) which she commissioned at the 2013 Jackson Hole Wildlife Film Festival. and grew popular franchises such as Autumnwatch and Winterwatch, Gordon Buchanan's ...And Me series, Animals in Love and Nature's Weird Events.

She expanded the range of science subjects on TV to include more difficult topics such as maths and unusual programmes such as After Life: The Strange Science of Decay, a 90-minute film using timelapse cameras to record a glass kitchen full of decomposing food, which doubled BBC Four's usual ratings. and was reported as "a winner with audiences" She brought the Royal Institution's Christmas Lecture back to the BBC after an absence of more than a decade. She commissioned popular science series including Stargazing Live, which won its slot against drama on BBC One, Brian Cox's Wonders of the Universe, Trust Me I'm a Doctor, Supermarket Secrets, Bang Goes the Theory. and factual drama such as Challenger starring William Hurt as physicist Richard Feynman which won the RTS Award for Best Single Drama.

The proportion of science-themed broadcasting on BBC One is said to have risen during Shillinglaw's period in charge of the department. In 2010, she organised the BBC's Year of Science to raise the profile of science, which reportedly increased the BBC's science reach by more than four million people and doubled the number of searches for BBC Science. On Dec 7th 2010 the Telegraph reviewed it as "a fantastic moment for science on tv" and "a glorious new age of science of television". In a speech to the Royal Society the Science Minister David Willets MP said "The BBC has been doing a fantastic job" and DCMS identified 'the BBC's decision to make science a more prominent part of its schedules" as a 'key factor' in the growth of interest in science. Output she commissioned is said to have had a significant effect on the British public offscreen. Many of her science programmes have become staples of classroom teaching, and physics qualifications are said to have increased due to the ‘Brian Cox’ effect and sales of telescopes due to Stargazing Live.

The Times included Shillinglaw in a list of the top 100 influential people in British science, observing her role promoting more female presenters onto screen, as well as introducing Brian Cox to television. "The fact that Shillinglaw has chosen presenters with serious academic backgrounds, as opposed to simple celebrity sparkle, also brings her respect among the scientific community". In a 2011 article for The Guardian, she argued television had not done enough to include women onscreen. Shillinglaw brought more diversity to screen, including Liz Bonin, Kevin Fong, Helen Czerski, Gabrielle Weston, Maggie Aderin-Pocock, Hannah Fry, and Saleyha Asan, among others. She is reported as having tweeted: "Why are only women on Mock the Week compilations laughing cutaways? They never get to speak. Surely not because not funny?" In 2012, Broadcast magazine's Hot 100 described her as "about as far from the stereotype of a BBC commissioner as you can get: enthusiastic, uncensored and jargon free".

Shillinglaw has a long-standing involvement in tech innovation but has also expressed scepticism about hype. She ran experimentation with VR, AR and 3D for The BBC, including 3D versions of Dr Who, Wimbledon and David Attenborough, and was quoted as saying "watching 3D is quite a hassly experience in the home". In 2014 she was interviewed by technology magazine Wired where she speculated that "technology often asks us to work too hard". In 2013 Shillinglaw conceived and initiated Make it Digital, the largest BBC initiative of its kind, to inspire a new generation to get creative with coding and digital technology, which the BBC launched in 2015. The project provided a free Micro Bit coding device to all year 7 children across the UK, one million devices in total, and apprenticeships, and created a season of output involving BBC brands such as Doctor Who, Eastenders, Radio 1 and BBC Weather. Shillinglaw also commissioned a factual drama about video game Grand Theft Auto for BBC2, starring Daniel Radcliffe. The project was backed by around fifty organisations, including ARM, Barclays, British Computing Society, BT, the DWP, Microsoft, the Skills Funding Agency and Tech City UK. Shillinglaw has also contributed to tech education and innovation policy on the Board of the innovation think tank NESTA, which she joined in 2012 and the Board of the Raspberry Pi Foundation. She chaired an R&D taskforce funded by the Wellcome Trust.

Other roles during this time included various public-private partnerships, chairing the BBC's Commercial Genre Board which increased long term commercial funding for Natural History output, and chairing the BBC's DQF Taskforce on Commercial Income which drew up a strategy for integrated public-private working between the BBC and BBC Worldwide and eventually led to the creation of BBC Studios.

== BBC Two and BBC Four ==
She assumed her posts as controller of both BBC Two and BBC Four in April 2014, in succession to Janice Hadlow at a time when after many years of strong performance critics such as Melvyn Bragg were reported as saying "certain things are rather tired about it now", calling for a "boot up the rear" and pointing to ageing audiences. The Guardian newspaper reported that her appointment was welcomed by the creative community. Roly Keating, former BBC2 Controller and Chief Executive of the British Library, described Shillinglaw as "creative, sharp and decisive, with a serious track record of bringing complex ideas to mainstream audiences". Her educational background attracted comment: "in some ways it's a relief that someone like her can do well at the BBC. She doesn't have a private education and doesn't have lots of connections".

During her period as the 13th (and final) controller of BBC Two, Shillinglaw told Broadcast magazine that "BBC Two is a fundamentally grown-up channel but should be young at heart". In a speech to the Edinburgh TV festival she emphasised more contemporary documentaries saying she wanted BBC Two "to be part of the national conversation, tackling contemporary issues in lively and intelligent ways and referenced the kind of "challenging subjects" by "fantastic documentary makers" she wanted to see on the channel.

New programmes on contemporary subjects included the Bafta, RTS and Emmy award-winning Exodus: Our Journey to Europe series about the refugee crisis, Britain's Forgotten Slave Owners, Meet the Ukippers, Britain's Jihadi Brides, Louis Theroux on Jimmy Savile, Black and British: A Forgotten History by David Olusoga, which Shillinglaw announced as aiming "to change the way we all see our national story", large scale social experiments such as the Bafta-winning Muslims Like Us and programmes to make economics more accessible such as The Town That Took on the Taxman, and seasons on The Super Rich and Us and Britain's Black Economy, aimed at “exposing the jaw-dropping luxury in which the richest one percent of society live” and “exploring the impact such lifestyle extremes have on contemporary Britain”. According to the television producer contacts of journalist George Monbiot, she was less keen to commission programmes on environmental issues . At the same time Shillinglaw introduced more factual entertainment to BBC Two such as The Real Marigold Hotel with Miriam Margolis, Inside The Factory, The Great Pottery Throwdown (later poached by C4) and more event factual such as World's Busiest Railway, which was the highest launch for any new factual series across C4 and BBC Two in 2015 Scheduling changes included the Clever Quiz Hour pairing Only Connect and University Challenge to create a stronger early evening for the channel, bringing Women's Football into primetime and introducing lighter 'funny factual' at 10pm such as the popular Normal For Norfolk and Abz on the Farm. This attracted comment from critics as "BBC2 isn't usually associated with reality television" although "it was immediately obvious why commissioners made this exception" and which the Radio Times described as "brilliant".

Shillinglaw invested more in BBC Two comedy and moved more comedy from late at night. She told the Radio Times “one of the things I wanted to do when I became BBC Two controller was to play comedy a bit earlier in the schedule. She recommissioned W1A and introduced the first female presenter of a BBC Panel Show, QI. New programmes included the multi-award winning Mum, by writer Stefan Golaszewski, the UK's first transgender comedy Boy Meets Girl, Lets Play Darts for Comic Relief with Richard Osman, and Upstart Crow by Ben Elton. Drama included Wolf Hall, reportedly BBC Two's most popular drama since 2002, London Spy, Marvellous and Versailles. BBC Four continued a high level of original commissions, particularly on Arts, Science and History topics including Slow TV, Young Dancer of the Year and a Pop Art Season with idents created by Peter Blake.

In 2015 BBC Two won more RTS awards than any other UK channel, increased its peak time share of viewers and significantly grew its digital and social activity. In 2015 Shillinglaw was nominated as a Red Magazine Woman of the Year for "consistently bringing fresh ideas and a contemporary edge to BBC Two by commissioning shows that change the way we think and feel", and named as one of the most influential people in British media by the Radio Times.

In January 2016, it was announced the posts of BBC One, BBC Two and BBC Four controllers would be abolished that year in a re-structure by the BBC's director general Tony Hall, following a difficult licence fee negotiation during which the BBC was required to take on the cost of free television licence provision for the over-75s. At the same time, it became known Shillinglaw was leaving the BBC; however, according to The Guardian it was intended that she would work through her six-month notice period. In July 2016 it credited her with "making BBC2 a livelier and crucially, younger channel". Following her departure the BBC Two and BBC Four budgets were cut, reportedly to boost spending on BBC One.

== Later career ==
In August 2016, she was appointed as the first Director of factual businesses at Endemol Shine UK. She is reported to have executed substantial restructuring within the group, including hiring new managing directors for several companies, merging or rebranding other businesses, and opening new offices in Belfast, Manchester and Leeds. She increased the number of returning franchises with global sales potential and in 2018 and 2019 several companies reporting to her were named best places to work in TV by industry bible Broadcast. Over four years, she tripled turnover and substantially increased profitability before exiting on the successful sale of EndemolShine to Banijay.

Shillinglaw is a non-executive director at Natural England, at Ofcom, the Natural Environment Research Council, and Raspberry Pi.

== Personal life ==
She is married to the television producer Steve Condie, who has worked on Newsnight. The couple live in west London and have two children.

Media offices
Preceded by Janice Hadlow	Controller of BBC Two; 2014–2016	Succeeded by Abolished
Preceded by Richard Klein	Controller of BBC Four; 2014–2016	Succeeded by Abolished
