= 2015 United Kingdom general election debates =

Aspect of the 2015 United Kingdom General Election campaign

	Ed Miliband		
David Cameron Conservative	Ed Miliband Labour	Nick Clegg Liberal Democrats	
Nigel Farage UKIP	Natalie Bennett Green (E&W)	Nicola Sturgeon SNP	Leanne Wood Plaid Cymru
← 2010 debates	2015	2017 debates →	

The 2015 United Kingdom general election debates were a series of four live television programmes featuring the leaders of seven main British parties that took place during the run-up to the general election. They each featured different formats and participants.

The first was a one-on-one programme between David Cameron, Prime Minister (Conservative Party), and Ed Miliband, Leader of the Opposition (Labour Party). The second featured Cameron, Miliband, Nick Clegg, Deputy Prime Minister (Liberal Democrats), Nigel Farage (UKIP), Natalie Bennett (Green Party of England and Wales), Nicola Sturgeon, First Minister of Scotland (SNP), and Leanne Wood (Plaid Cymru). The third debate featured the leaders of the five opposition parties: Miliband, Farage, Bennett, Sturgeon, and Wood. The final programme's participants were Cameron, Miliband, and Clegg. Only the Labour Party's Miliband participated in all four events.

The formats and participants were arrived at after a lengthy process. Following the result of the election, a survey of 3,019 people, carried out by Panelbase, found that 38% of voters considered the debates to have influenced their voting intention.

== Background ==
The first series of televised leaders' debates in the United Kingdom were held in the previous election. Broadcasters proposed another series of televised debates in the run up to the 2015 election, although in a different format. The suggestion was that the debates should take place during the early stages of the campaign, before April. Cameron suggested that the televised debates should take place before the campaign itself, as he felt that the 2010 debates overshadowed the rest of the campaign; he was, however, still positive towards them taking place.

There was media speculation from individuals such as Michael Crick of Channel 4 News as to who may be included in the debates. He suggested that if UKIP did not receive sufficient coverage, they could make a legal case against broadcasters that under-represent the party, if the leaders of the Conservative Party, Labour Party and Liberal Democrats are included. Prime Minister David Cameron had dismissed the call for UKIP's participation. The Leader of the Opposition Ed Miliband said in January 2013 that the composition of each debate was a matter for the media organisations.

In the run-up to the European Parliament election, 2014, there were two debates between the leader of the Liberal Democrats Nick Clegg and the UK Independence Party leader Nigel Farage. According to polling, Mr Farage is reported to have comfortably won both debates and this prompted further speculation that Farage could or should be invited to take part in the debates ahead of the general election. UKIP won the European elections, topping the poll. This further strengthened Farage's case and increased calls for UKIP to be represented in such TV debates.

In October 2014, the BBC, ITV, Channel 4 and Sky News announced joint plans for three debates, one with just the leaders of the Conservative and Labour parties, a second also including the Liberal Democrats, and a third including UKIP. Several other parties represented in the Commons complained at their exclusion from this plan. On 30 October the Green Party were informed by the BBC that their requests to be included in TV debates was rejected. However, the Green Party did not give up, and were boosted by the existence of a petition in support of their inclusion with over 275,000 signatures.

David Cameron then said that he would not take part unless the Greens did. As a result of this combined pressure, ITV and the BBC published revised plans in January 2015, including the Greens, as well as the SNP and Plaid Cymru (who only stand in Scotland and Wales respectively). Many of the Northern Irish political parties then made statements requesting their inclusion in the debates. Sinn Féin sought legal advice, while the Democratic Unionist Party wrote to the BBC and ITV demanding their inclusion. George Galloway, the sole MP for the Respect Party, also argued for his inclusion, on the basis that Respect then had the same number of MPs as the Greens. The DUP's formal complaint was rejected by the BBC.

=== Planning and negotiations ===
==== Early proposals and arrangements ====
On 9 May 2014—almost exactly a year before the election date—David Cameron proposed a five-way debate, with the leaders of "all the main parties". This would be followed up by a separate "head to head" debate between himself and Labour's Ed Miliband. This itself was an adjustment from an earlier proposal of Cameron for three debates.

During October that year, all four main broadcasters, the BBC, ITV, Channel 4 and Sky announced joint plans for multi-platform party leader debates in the run up to the 2015 general election. Three debates would have taken place within the six-week campaign period, at a time when the parties were to be setting out their policies, to help further engage the audience with the election. The proposal entailed debates at fortnightly intervals on 2 April, 16 April and 30 April at locations around the UK.

- The First Debate was to be a "head to head" debate between David Cameron and Ed Miliband.
- The Second Debate was to follow the pattern of the 2010 debates, between the Conservative, Labour and Liberal Democrat leaders.
- The third Debate would have had the Conservative, Labour, Liberal Democrat and UKIP leaders.

In January 2015, ITV and the BBC published revised plans for the television election debates to include seven main UK political parties' leaders. The revised proposals would see the debates being held on Thursdays: 2, 16, and 30 April 2015, during the general election campaign.

The proposals issued were for:

- Two seven-way debates including representatives of the Conservative Party, Labour, Liberal Democrats, UKIP, Greens, SNP and Plaid Cymru one hosted by BBC, and the other by ITV.
- A debate that would be 'head-to-head' between David Cameron and Ed Miliband, jointly hosted by Channel 4 and Sky.

Warnings were given from all the broadcasters that if the leaders failed to turn up an 'empty chair' would be used instead.

On 23 February 2015, the broadcasters agreed on three debates:

- 2 April: ITV - Debate between the party leaders of the Conservatives, Labour, Liberal Democrats, UKIP, the SNP, the Green Party and Plaid Cymru.
- 16 April: BBC - A second debate between the seven party leaders above.
- 30 April: Sky and Channel 4 - Head-to-head debate between the Leader of the Conservative Party and the Leader of the Labour Party.

==== March 2015 ====
On 4 March 2015 David Cameron stated, in what was described as a "final offer", that he would only participate in a single debate, involving the leaders of the Conservatives, Labour, the Liberal Democrats, UKIP, the SNP, the Green Party, Plaid Cymru and possibly the Democratic Unionist Party (DUP). He also said that the debate must occur before the start of the short campaign, i.e. before 30 March 2015. His announcement effectively ruled out the proposed one on one debate between Ed Miliband and the Prime Minister, and raised the prospect of Cameron being "empty chaired" in debates involving other party leaders but not him. On 6 March, the broadcasters confirmed that they intended to go ahead with all three debates. In response to the possibility of Cameron being "empty chaired", Ofcom warned that broadcasters had to be careful about impartiality rules.

The Telegraph and The Guardian, in association with Google and YouTube, then announced that they intended to hold an internet-broadcast live debate, which was planned to feature David Cameron, Ed Miliband, Nick Clegg, Nigel Farage, and Natalie Bennett, and had issued an invitation to the five party leaders. The debate was to be held on 26 or 27 March (before the short campaign, as favoured by the Conservatives). The Liberal Democrats nominally expressed their intention to participate; however there was concern that the absence of the SNP might prove to be an obstacle. UKIP categorically agreed to participate. Conservative chairman Grant Shapps expressed that he was in favour. However, without any formal agreement forthcoming, the organisers wrote to David Cameron on 17 March asking for his commitment. The debate did not take place.

That day, the Conservatives accepted the offer of a single, 7-way debate to be broadcast on ITV on 2 April, with the other two planned debates cancelled. According to the Conservatives, they were approached with a new 4-programme plan, which was reported to be:

- 26 March on Sky/Channel 4: Leaders' interviews with Cameron and Miliband interviewed sequentially by Jeremy Paxman, with studio audience.
- 2 April on ITV: Debate with the leaders of the Conservatives, Labour, Liberal Democrats, UKIP, Greens, SNP, Plaid Cymru and DUP.
- 16 April: Debate with the "challenger parties", i.e. SNP, UKIP, Plaid Cymru, Greens and DUP.
- 30 April on BBC: Question Time with Cameron, Miliband and Clegg taking questions from audience sequentially.

The Liberal Democrats accepted these proposals, but Nick Clegg has said he still hoped for a four-way leaders debate involving the Conservatives, Labour, Liberal Democrats and UKIP (as the four main parties as defined by Ofcom). However, Labour and UKIP responded that they are only aware of the prior proposal from the broadcasters for three debates, which they still supported. The SNP, likewise, called on Cameron to take part in the three debates previously proposed. Commentators argued that the new proposed format would be better for the Conservatives than having three debates including a head-to-head with Miliband.

Negotiations continued, with the broadcasters offering to include Labour in the 16 April debate. A final settlement was reached on 21 March. The agreed schedule was only a slight modification of the 17 March proposal, with the "challenger party" debates now featuring Ed Miliband instead of a representative from the DUP, with resistance from the DUP. The final plan was thus:

- 26 March on Sky/Channel 4: Leaders' interviews, with Cameron and Miliband interviewed sequentially by Paxman, with a studio audience.
- 2 April on ITV: Debate with the leaders of the Conservatives, Labour, Liberal Democrats, UKIP, Greens, SNP and Plaid Cymru chaired by Julie Etchingham.
- 16 April on BBC: Debate with the "challenger parties", i.e. Labour, UKIP, SNP, Plaid Cymru and Greens, chaired by David Dimbleby.
- 30 April on BBC: Question Time with Cameron, Miliband and Clegg taking questions from the audience sequentially, chaired by Dimbleby.

=== Impact ===
The controversies around the initial planned exclusion of the Greens from the debates coincided with rapid increases in membership of the Green parties, and increase in their opinion poll ratings. The party referred to this increase as "The Green Surge", their membership surpassing that of UKIP or the Liberal Democrats by mid-January.

== Cameron & Miliband: The Battle for Number 10 (26 March) ==
Channel 4, Sky and the BBC News Channel broadcast the first programme on 26 March. Miliband, having won the toss, chose to go second, so this programme consisted of Jeremy Paxman interviewing Cameron, Cameron facing questions from a studio audience (moderated by Kay Burley), Miliband facing the audience, and finally Paxman interviewing Miliband.

The programme was recorded in Studios 4 & 5 at Sky Studios in Isleworth.

=== Response ===
Average viewing figures for the show were 2.6 million on Channel 4 (11.7% of the TV audience) and 322,000 on Sky News. Several hundred complaints were received by Channel 4 and Ofcom claiming the programme was biased against Miliband.

According to the Evening Standard the next day, Cameron was "widely deemed to have edged ahead". A Guardian/ICM instant poll found 54% thought Cameron had won to 46% for Miliband, while a YouGov "Instant Reaction" survey found 51% for Cameron and 49% for Miliband. A subsequent regular YouGov poll found that among undecided voters, 49% thought Milband had done best to 35% for Cameron. The Centre for the Analysis of Social Media concluded the social media reaction was more favourable towards Miliband. Newsnight's political editor called Miliband the winner.

Labour's election polling improved following the programme in one poll and was better among those who watched it with YouGov, but Miliband's and Labour's polling worsened with ComRes and other polling failed to show any impact of the debate.

== The ITV Leaders' Debate (2 April) ==
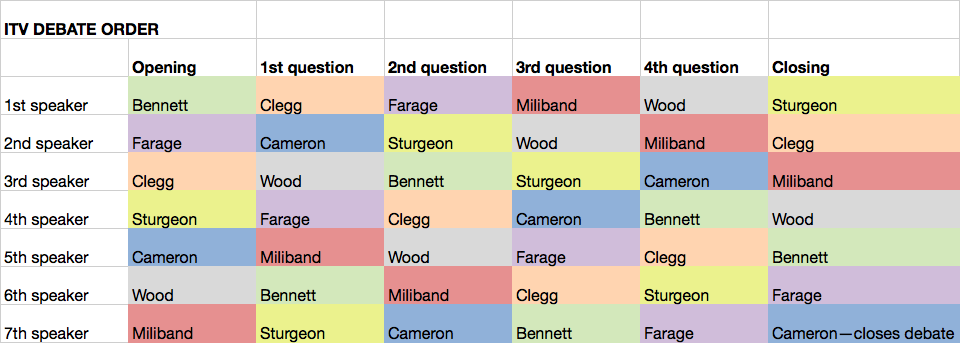
Line up of the debate

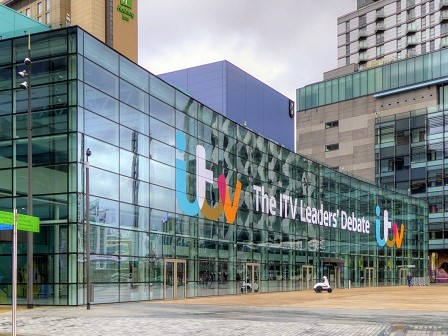
The ITV Leaders' Debate held at dock10 studios, MediaCityUK

A two-hour debate between seven party leaders was hosted by ITV News anchor Julie Etchingham on 2 April at dock10 studios in Salford. They were positioned on the stage as follows (left to right):

- Natalie Bennett (Green Party of England and Wales)
- Nick Clegg, Deputy Prime Minister (Liberal Democrats)
- Nigel Farage (UKIP)
- Ed Miliband, Leader of the Opposition (Labour Party)
- Leanne Wood (Plaid Cymru)
- Nicola Sturgeon, First Minister of Scotland (Scottish National Party)
- David Cameron, Prime Minister (Conservative Party)

The order in which each leader delivered their opening statement was decided by lots, with the order being Bennett, Farage, Clegg, Sturgeon, Cameron, Wood, and Miliband.

=== Response ===
The audience for the debate averaged about 7 million, peaking at 7.4 million.

Several polling organisations surveyed those who had viewed the debate immediately afterwards to select who they believed "won" the debate.

Snap^{*} opinion polls as reported by the BBC
Survey Organiser's/Political Party Leader	Natalie Bennett (Green)	Nick Clegg (Lib Dems)	Nigel Farage (UKIP)	Ed Miliband (Lab)	Leanne Wood (Plaid)	Nicola Sturgeon (SNP)	David Cameron (Con)
ICM (The Guardian)	3%	9%	19%	25%	2%	17%	24%
ComRes (ITV)	5%	9%	21%	21%	2%	20%	21%
YouGov (The Times / The Sun)	5%	10%	20%	15%	4%	28%	18%
Survation (Daily Mirror)	3%	6%	24%	25%	2%	15%	25%

^{*} "Snap" is based on the phrase "snap decision".

On a forced choice between Cameron and Miliband, Survation found Cameron the winner.

There were 1.4 million tweets about the debate, with the most tweeted moment being Farage's comments about HIV+ immigrants. Sturgeon's Twitter account received most mentions, followed by Farage, Bennett, Miliband, Wood, Cameron and Clegg. An IPSOS Mori analysis of tweets found them most favourable towards Sturgeon, then Wood, Bennett, Miliband and Clegg tied, Farage and least favourable to Cameron.

The Democratic Unionist Party, which is a Northern Irish unionist party, was not included on the television debates. Nigel Dodds, the Deputy Leader for the Party, said that:

It is wrong that Northern Ireland should be excluded [from the TV debates], after all the Democratic Unionist Party has 8 MPs currently in the outgoing parliament and we're going to play a very crucial role in the next parliament. We're bigger than four of the other parties that were included in the debate, so I think that it's only fair and proper that all regions of the United Kingdom are represented.

== BBC Election Debate 2015 (16 April) ==
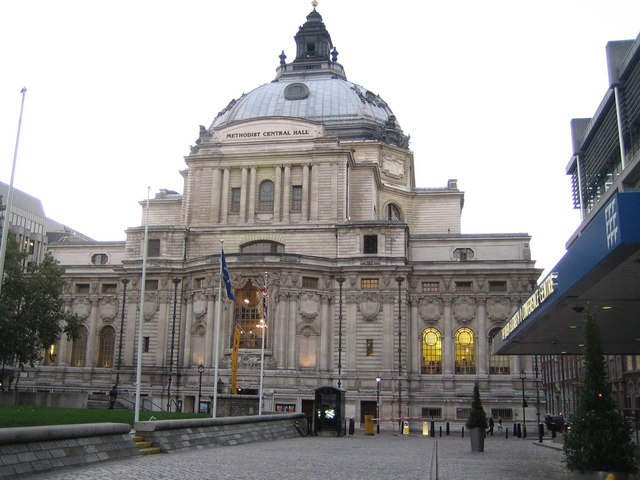
Methodist Central Hall

A debate between five opposition party leaders hosted by David Dimbleby was shown on BBC1 on 16 April. It was also available on the BBC News and Sky News channels. The debate was held at the Methodist Central Hall in Westminster, London. The leaders involved were:

- Ed Miliband, Leader of the Opposition (Labour Party)
- Nigel Farage (UKIP)
- Natalie Bennett (Green Party of England and Wales)
- Nicola Sturgeon, First Minister of Scotland (SNP)
- Leanne Wood (Plaid Cymru)

The other parties criticised Cameron's absence from the debate. Clegg, despite wishing to attend, was also omitted from the debate, with reports saying Cameron blocked his presence, but Conservative Party sources said the decision was the broadcasters'.

=== Response ===
Across all three channels, 8.8 million watched at least a portion of the programme.

Miliband was judged to have won the debate in a snap poll from Survation, with 35% to Sturgeon on 31%, Farage on 27%, Bennett on 5% and then Wood on 2%. The most mentioned on Twitter was Miliband, followed by Sturgeon.

=== Allegations of Audience Bias ===
During the 16 April debate, Nigel Farage accused the BBC of a left-wing bias in selecting the studio audience. The BBC explained that the audience had not been selected by them, but by an independent polling organisation in such a way as to give a balanced audience.

== Question Time special (30 April) ==
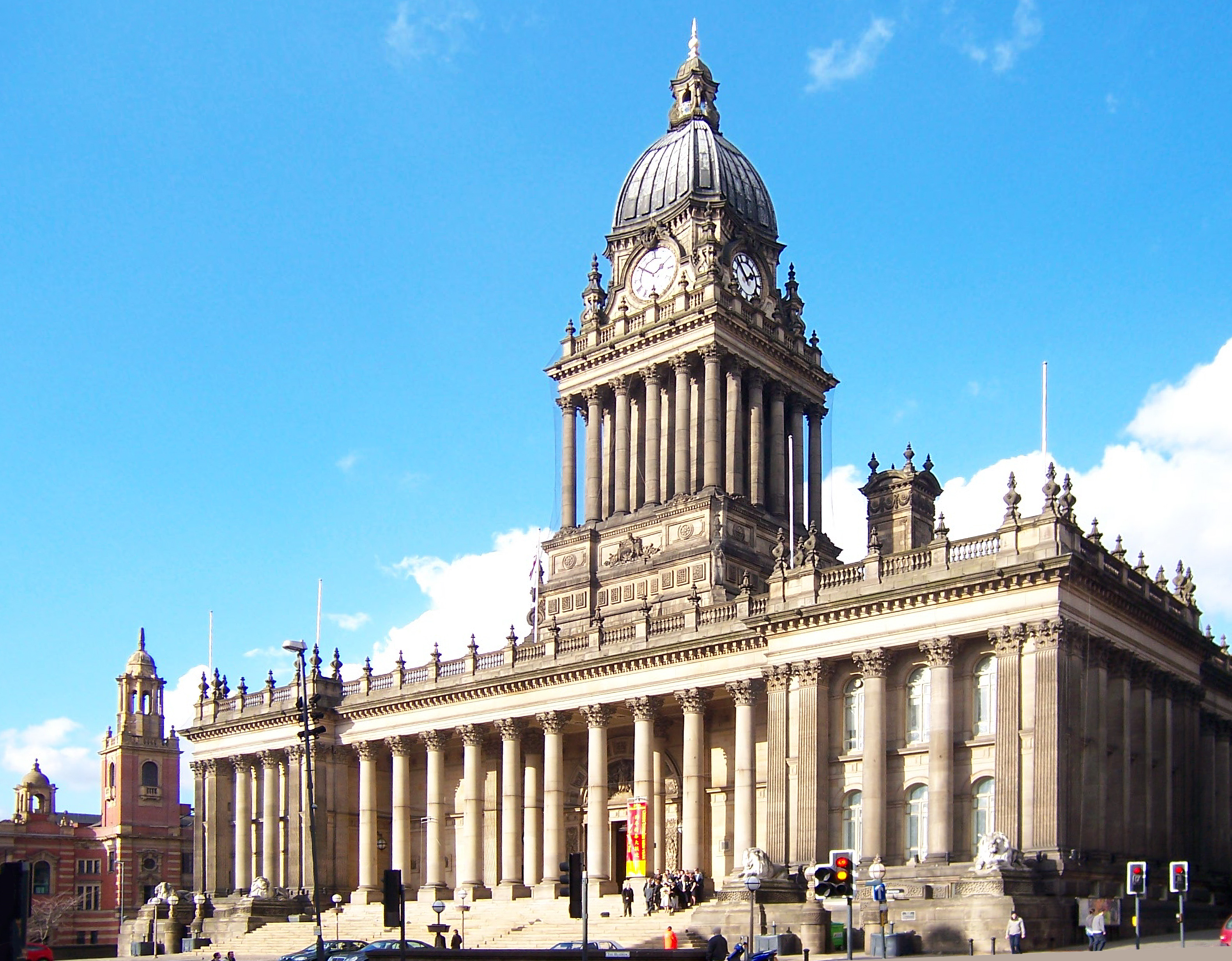
Leeds Town Hall

David Cameron, Ed Miliband and Nick Clegg were the featured in a BBC Question Time special programme at Leeds Town Hall on 30 April presented by David Dimbleby from 20:00 BST to 21:30 BST. Nigel Farage, Nicola Sturgeon and Leanne Wood were each featured in separate question and answer events hosted by the BBC after the Question Time special programme. These events were broadcast that night by the BBC and Sky News channels. In each event the host asked members of the audience to ask the party leaders various pre-prepared questions about varying topics. The audience in each event was sorted by their political affiliation and the topic of their questions.

=== Question Time with David Dimbleby ===
David Cameron, Ed Miliband and Nick Clegg each were given about half an hour to answer questions from the audience while David Dimbleby moderated. At this event, David Cameron refused to rule out cutting child benefits. Ed Miliband declared that he would either be Prime Minister with a majority of seats in Parliament or not be in power at all rather than form a coalition with the Scottish National Party.

==== Response ====
An instant Guardian/ICM poll declared that Cameron had 'won the debate' with 44% - Ed Miliband came second with 38% and Nick Clegg finished last with 19%.

=== Ask... ===
Nicola Sturgeon was given about half an hour to answer questions from an audience at the BBC's Scotland Headquarters in Glasgow. Ask Nicola Sturgeon was broadcast at 21:30 BST on BBC1 in Scotland.

Plaid Cymru leader Leanne Wood and UKIP leader Nigel Farage recorded half-hour programmes earlier in the day. Their programmes were called Ask Leanne Wood and Ask Nigel Farage, and were recorded in Cardiff and Birmingham respectively. Ask Leanne Wood was broadcast on BBC1 in Wales at 22:45 BST. Ask Nigel Farage was broadcast on BBC1 in England at 22:45 BST, and on BBC1 in Wales at 23:10 BST.

== Debates for Northern Ireland, Scotland and Wales ==
=== Scotland ===
==== Scotland Debates (7 April) ====
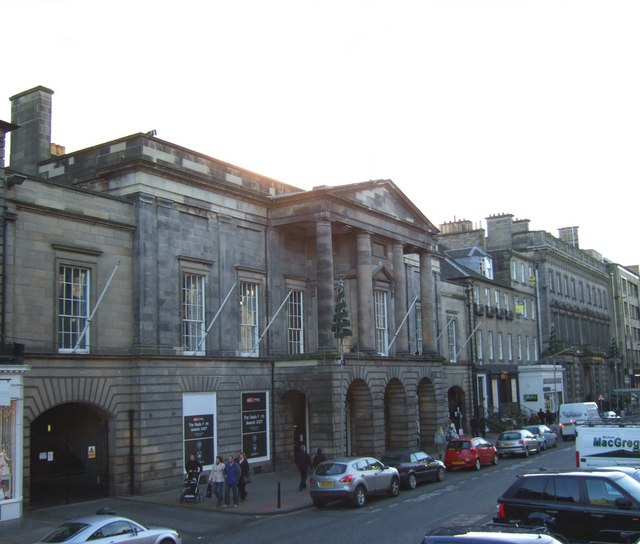
The Assembly Rooms

STV broadcast the first Scottish Leaders Debate in the run up to the general election, which was moderated by then-STV News Political Editor Bernard Ponsonby. The debate took place at the Assembly Rooms in Edinburgh between:

- Jim Murphy, Leader of the Scottish Labour Party.
- Ruth Davidson, Leader of the Scottish Conservatives and Regional List MSP for Glasgow.
- Willie Rennie, Leader of the Scottish Liberal Democrats and Regional List MSP for Mid Scotland and Fife.
- Nicola Sturgeon, Leader of the SNP, First Minister of Scotland and Constituency MSP for Glasgow Southside.

The Scottish Green Party protested that it was unfair that they were excluded from this debate.

==== The Leaders' Debate - Scotland (8 April) ====
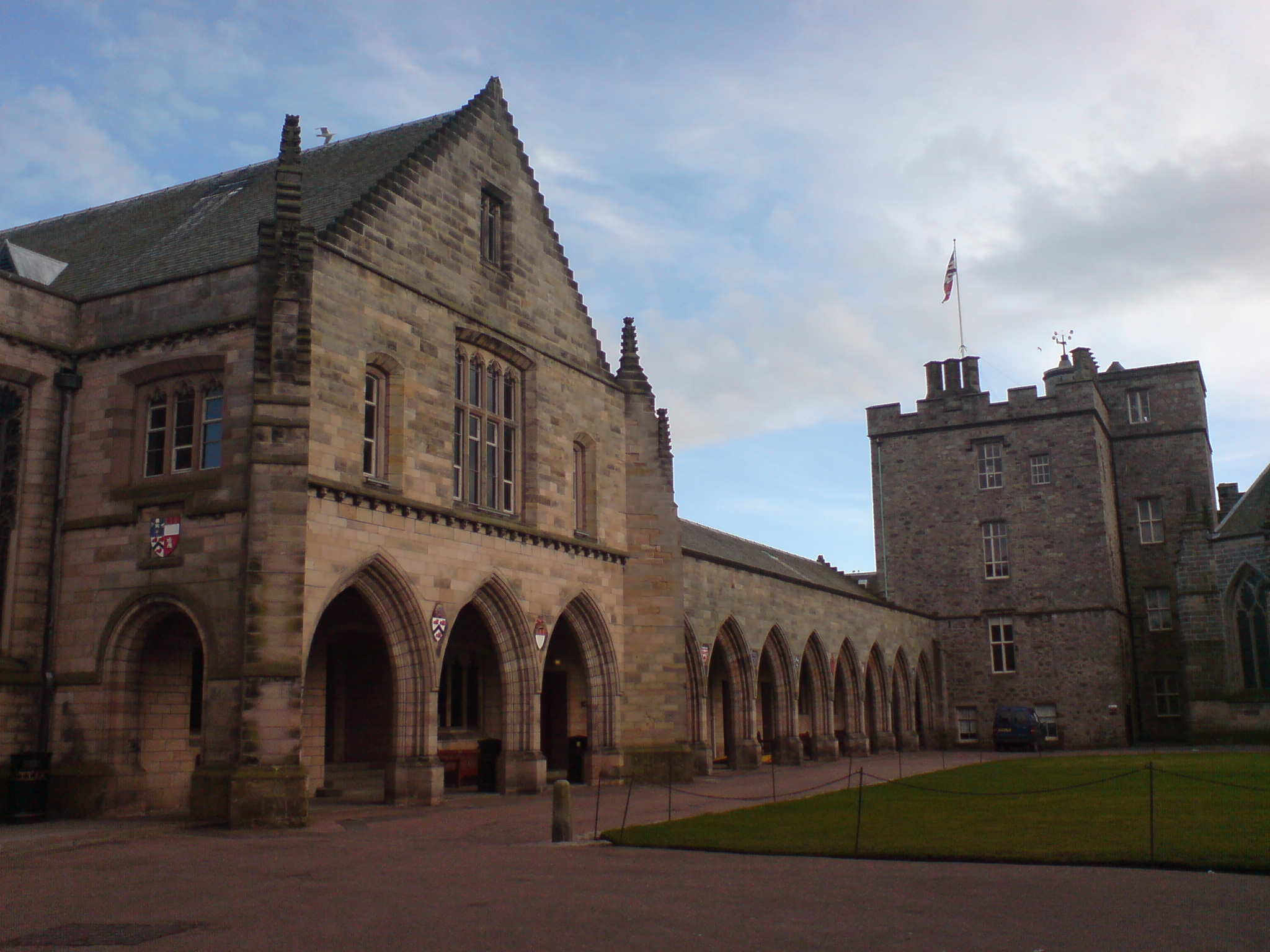
Elphinstone Hall

This BBC Scotland debate took place in the Elphinstone Hall in Aberdeen University. It was moderated by James Cook. It included six Scottish Party Leaders:

- Jim Murphy, Leader of the Scottish Labour Party and MP for East Renfrewshire.
- Ruth Davidson, Leader of the Scottish Conservative Party and Regional List MSP for Glasgow.
- Willie Rennie, Leader of the Scottish Liberal Democrats and Regional List MSP for Mid Scotland and Fife.
- Nicola Sturgeon, Leader of the SNP, First Minister of Scotland and Constituency MSP for Glasgow Southside.
- Patrick Harvie, Co-convenor of the Scottish Green Party and Regional List MSP for Glasgow.
- David Coburn, Leader of UKIP Scotland and MEP for Scotland

==== Sunday Politics Scotland Debate (12 April) ====
The 40-minute debate, with Jim Murphy, Ruth Davidson, Willie Rennie and Nicola Sturgeon, was broadcast on Sunday Politics Scotland. The debate was criticised, with many of the public claiming it was a "shambles".

==== The Leaders' Debate (3 May) ====
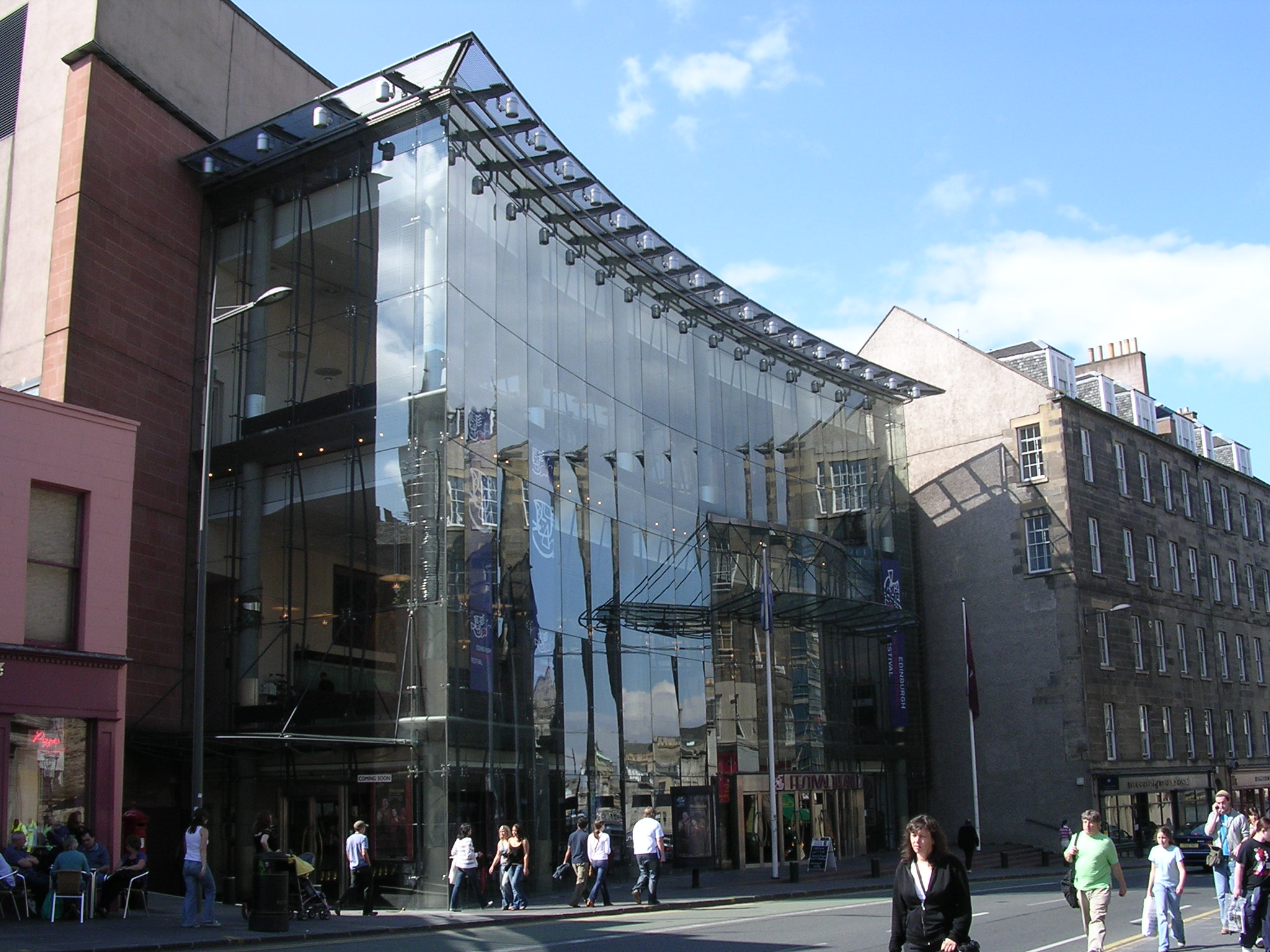
The Festival Theatre

This debate was shown on BBC One Scotland, BBC News and BBC Parliament. It featured representatives from the Conservatives, Labour, Liberal Democrats and the SNP, and was hosted by Glenn Campbell at the Festival Theatre in Edinburgh.

=== Northern Ireland ===
==== Newsnight in Northern Ireland (16 April 2015) ====
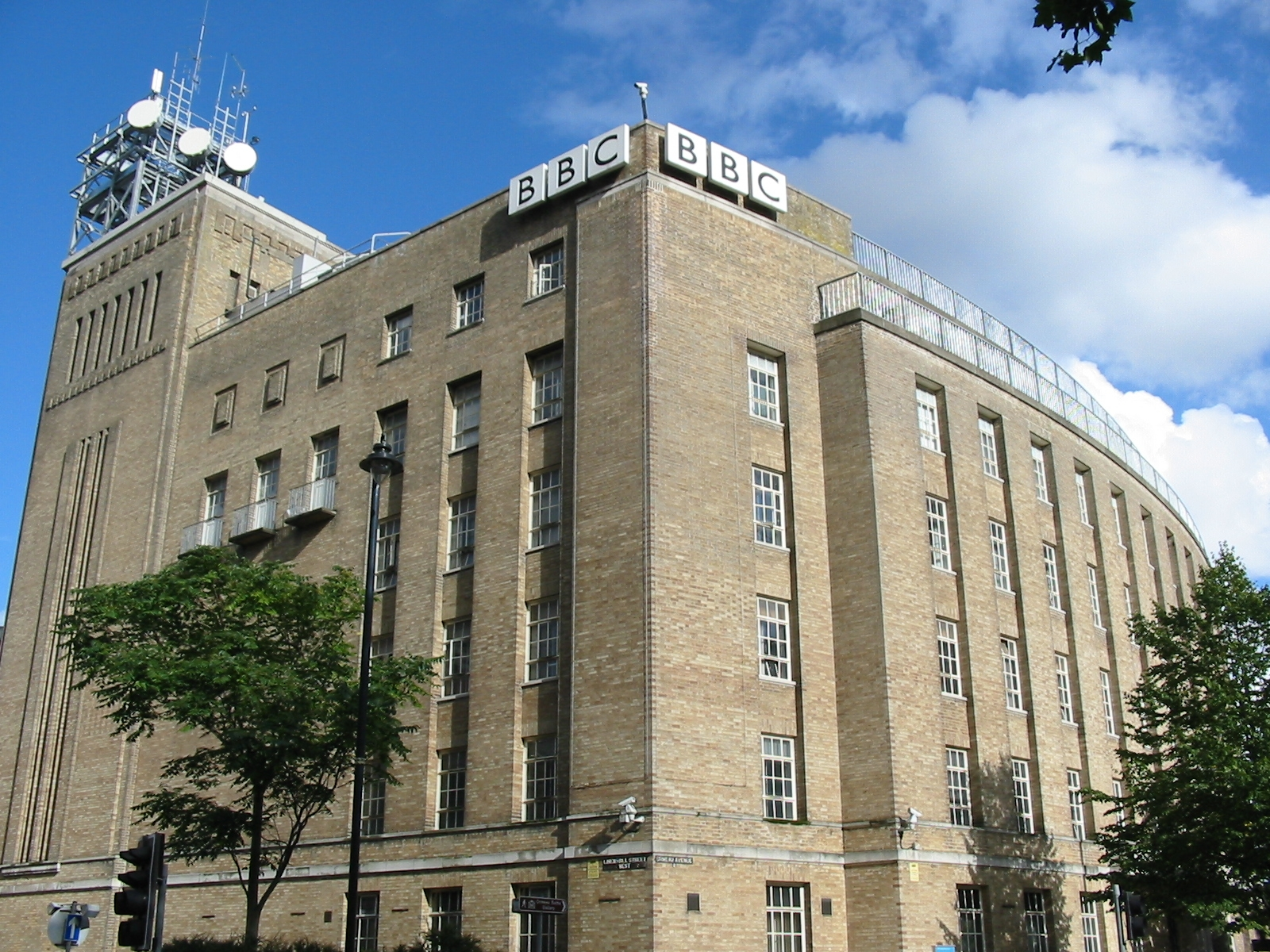
Broadcasting House

Newsnight hosted a political debate between the representatives of Northern Ireland's five largest parties. It was held in Broadcasting House in Belfast and hosted by Evan Davis. The participants were as follows:

- Nigel Dodds, Deputy Leader of the Democratic Unionist Party, Leader of the DUP in Parliament and MP for Belfast North.
- Máirtín Ó Muilleoir, Sinn Féin MLA for Belfast South.
- Mark Durkan, SDLP MP for Foyle.
- David Ford, Leader of the Alliance Party and MLA for South Antrim.
- Mike Nesbitt, Leader of the Ulster Unionist Party and MLA for Strangford.

This was broadcast on 16 April 2015, the same night the BBC Election Debate at Westminster. This was seen as an attempt by the BBC to include the Northern Ireland parties in the UK general election as they were not included in the nationwide BBC or ITV debates although the local debates organised by BBC NI and UTV were to be broadcast across the rest of the UK. The debate was televised live from Belfast on BBC One Northern Ireland and on BBC Two across the rest of the United Kingdom.

==== UTV Debate ====
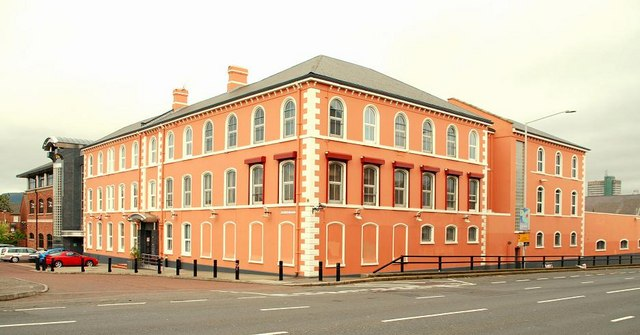
Havelock House, the UTV studios in Belfast

UTV held a one-hour election debate on 28 April 2015 from 8pm-9pm presented from UTV studios in Belfast by Mark Mallett featuring the 5 main Northern Ireland Parties. The participants were;

- Nigel Dodds
- Mark Durkan
- Martin McGuinness: Sinn Féin Deputy Leader & Deputy First Minister of Northern Ireland. Elected MP for Mid Ulster 1997, 2001, 2005 and 2010.
- Naomi Long: Deputy Leader of Alliance Party. MP for Belfast East.
- Danny Kennedy: Ulster Unionist Party MLA & Minister for Regional Development in the Northern Ireland Executive.

UTV held a second half-hour election debate on 28 April 2015 from 10.45pm-11.15pm presented from UTV studios in Belfast by Mark Mallett featuring the smaller Parties standing in Northern Ireland. The participants were:

- Richard Cairns representing the Traditional Unionist Voice (TUV)
- Paul Birch representing Cannabis is Safer than Alcohol (CISTA)
- Lily Kerr representing the Workers Party
- Neil Wilson representing the Northern Ireland Conservative Party
- Steven Agnew representing the Green Party
- David McNarry representing the United Kingdom Independence Party (UKIP)

The first debate featuring the main 5 Northern Ireland parties was broadcast later that evening on the national ITV network after the News at Ten, but not by STV.

==== BBC NI Debate ====
BBC Northern Ireland held a primetime TV debate between the main Northern Ireland parties: DUP, Sinn Féin, SDLP, UUP and Alliance. and this happened just 2 days before the Election on Tuesday 5 May 2015. The debate was chaired by Noel Thompson. The participants were;

- Nigel Dodds
- Mark Durkan
- Martin McGuinness
- Naomi Long
- Mike Nesbitt

The debate was broadcast Live on BBC One Northern Ireland between 8pm-9.15pm and simulcast on the BBC News Channel, following the debate BBC Northern Ireland broadcast reaction between 9.15pm-10pm with Tara Mills. The debate was also broadcast at 11.20pm on BBC Two across the rest of the United Kingdom following Newsnight.

=== Wales ===
==== Wales Election Debate ====
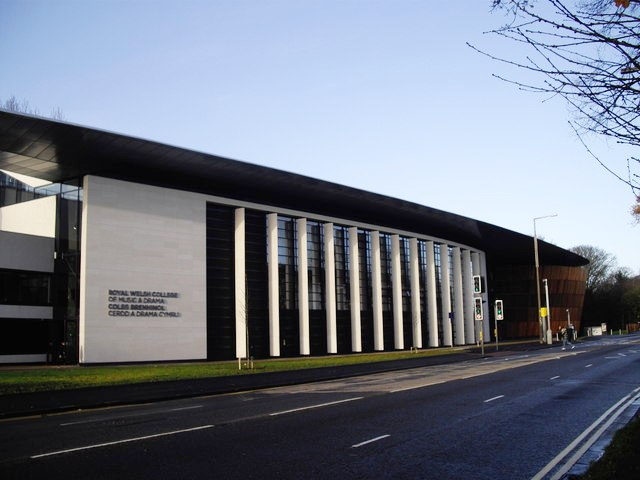
Royal Welsh College of Music & Drama

A televised debate took place 22 April 2015, It was held at the Royal Welsh College of Music & Drama in Cardiff. The debate was between:

- Stephen Crabb (Conservatives)
- Owen Smith (Labour)
- Kirsty Williams AM (Liberal Democrats)
- Leanne Wood AM (Plaid Cymru)
- Nathan Gill (UKIP)
- Pippa Bartolotti (Wales Green Party)

It was broadcast live on ITV Wales between 8pm and 10pm.

==== The Wales Report: The Leaders Election Debate ====
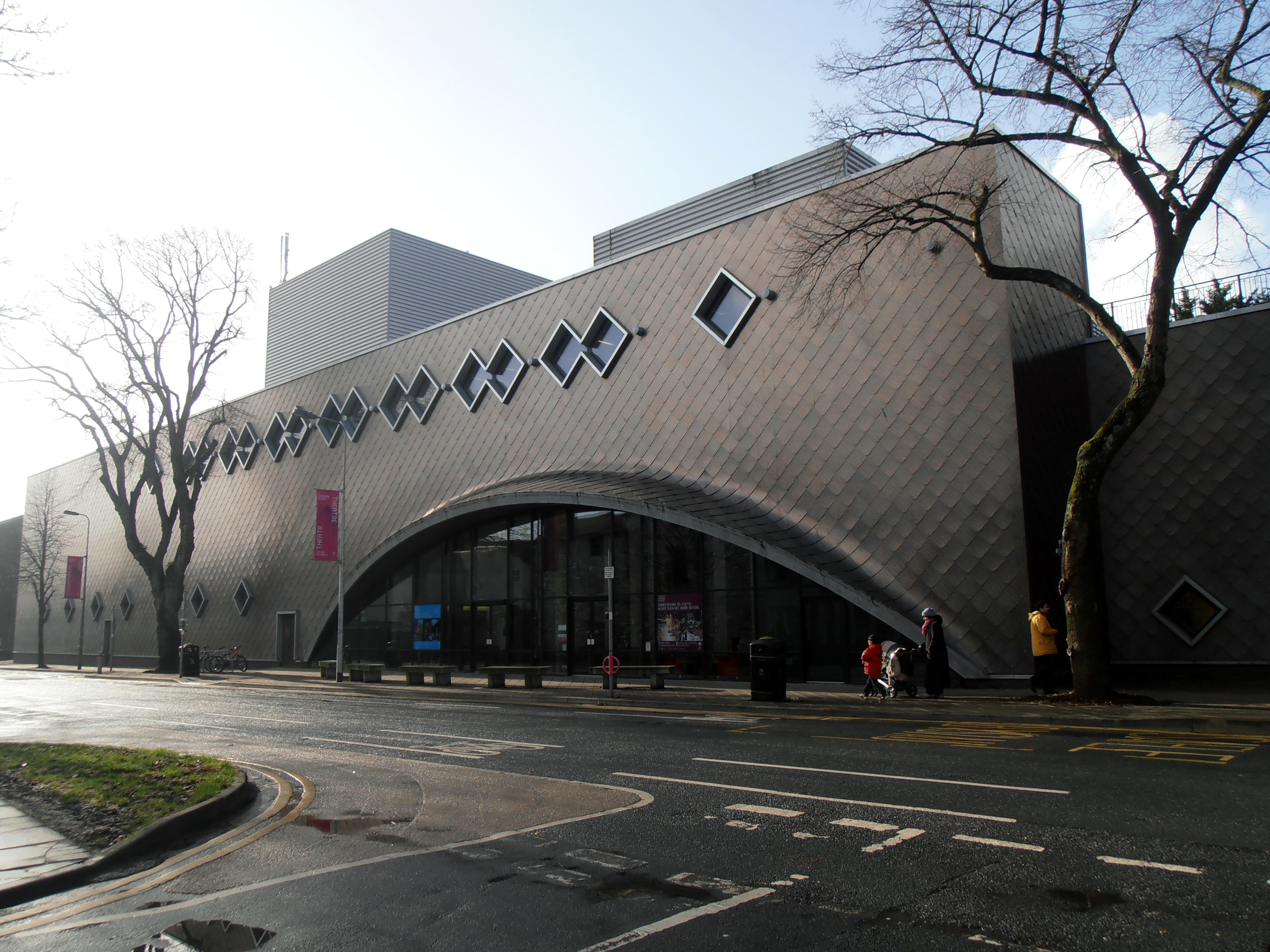
Sherman Theatre

BBC Wales televised debate took place 1 May 2015, It was held at the Sherman Theatre in Cardiff, chaired by Huw Edwards. The participants were:

- Kirsty Williams AM (Liberal Democrats)
- Leanne Wood AM (Plaid Cymru)
- Nathan Gill (UKIP)
- Pippa Bartolotti (Green Party)
- Stephen Crabb (Conservatives)
- Owen Smith (Labour)

It was broadcast live on BBC One Wales between 8.30pm-10pm on 1 May 2015.

== Daily Politics debates ==
During the run up to the general election, the Daily Politics held a series of special editions of the programme featuring debates moderated by Andrew Neil and another BBC correspondent and involving representatives from several political parties. They were:

Issue	Date	Correspondent	Conservative	Labour	Liberal Democrat	UKIP	Green	SNP/PC
Environment	20 April	Roger Harrabin	Matt Hancock	Caroline Flint	Ed Davey	Roger Helmer	Andrew Cooper	—
Foreign Affairs	21 April	Bridget Kendall	Philip Hammond	Douglas Alexander	Tim Farron	The Earl of Dartmouth	Patrick Harvie	—
Economy	22 April	Robert Peston	David Gauke	Chris Leslie	The Lord Newby	Patrick O'Flynn	—	Stewart Hosie (SNP)
Education	23 April	Branwen Jeffreys	Nicky Morgan	Tristram Hunt	David Laws	Jonathan Arnott	James Humphreys	—
Home Affairs	27 April	Mark Easton	Theresa May	Yvette Cooper	Norman Baker	Steven Woolfe	—	Simon Thomas (PC)
Defence	28 April	Mark Urban	Michael Fallon	Vernon Coaker	Nick Harvey	—	Rebecca Johnson	Angus Robertson (SNP)
Health	29 April	Hugh Pym	Jeremy Hunt	Andy Burnham	Norman Lamb	Angus Dalgleish	Jillian Creasy	—
Welfare	5 May	Alison Holt	Iain Duncan Smith	Rachel Reeves	Steve Webb	Suzanne Evans	Jonathan Bartley	—
Trust in Politics	6 May	Jo Coburn	William Hague	Harriet Harman	The Baroness Brinton	Diane James	—	Alyn Smith (SNP)

== Regional debates ==
Regional debates were also held by the BBC, featuring local correspondents and local politicians from the main political parties. They were broadcast simultaneously in each of England's regions on 29 April at 10:50pm. They were:

Region	Correspondent	Conservative	Labour	Liberal Democrat	UKIP	Green	Respect
East England	Stewart White	Liz Truss	Andy Sawford	Norman Lamb	Douglas Carswell	Rupert Read	—
East Midlands	Marie Ashby	Robert Jenrick	Chris Leslie	Lucy Care	Roger Helmer	Kat Boettge	—
East Yorkshire & Lincolnshire	Tim Iredale	Karl McCartney	Diana Johnson	Claire Thomas	Victoria Ayling	Vicky Dunn	—
London	Andrew Neil	Priti Patel	Sadiq Khan	Simon Hughes	Richard Hilton	Shahrar Ali	—
North East & Cumbria	Carol Malia	Guy Opperman	Julie Elliott	Helen Flynn	Phillip Broughton	Jill Perry	—
North West	Roger Johnson	Ben Wallace	Lucy Powell	Gordon Birtwistle	John Bickley	Elizabeth Ward	—
South England	Sally Taylor	Penny Mordaunt	Rowenna Davis	Layla Moran	Mike Glennon	Mark Chivers	—
South East	Polly Evans	Michael Fallon	Peter Kyle	Norman Baker	Mark Reckless	The Baroness Jones	—
South West	Justin Leigh	Sarah Newton	Ben Bradshaw	Dan Rogerson	Steve Crowther	Emily McIvor	—
West Country	David Garmston	Jacob Rees-Mogg	Thangam Debbonaire	Tessa Munt	Steve Stanbury	Dominic Tristram	—
West Midlands	Mary Rhodes	Sajid Javid	Tristram Hunt	Lorely Burt	Suzanne Evans	Will Duckworth	—
Yorkshire	Harry Gration	Julian Smith	Mary Creagh	Greg Mulholland	Toby Horton	Jillian Creasy	Asama Javed

== See also ==
- Politics of the United Kingdom
- 2015 United Kingdom general election
