= Politics Show =

BBC television political programme

- Genre: Current Affairs & Politics
- Presented by: Jeremy Vine (2003–2005); Jon Sopel (2005–2011)
- Theme music composer: Simon Lacey (2003–2009)
- Country of origin: United Kingdom
- Original language: English

Production
- Running time: 60 minutes

Original release
- Network: BBC One
- Release: 2 February 2003 – 11 December 2011

Related
- On the Record; Daily Politics

Politics Show is an hour-long BBC One television political programme which was broadcast in the United Kingdom on Sundays between 2 February 2003 and 11 December 2011, broadcasting usually at midday.

Politics Show was superseded by Sunday Politics, a weekend version of Daily Politics, which retains some of the elements of the former show.

== History ==
During 2000, the then Director-General of the BBC Greg Dyke ordered a review of political output from BBC, which was carried out by Fran Unsworth, leading to a major overhaul of political output in 2002. A number of flagship programmes were cancelled, including On the Record, Despatch Box and Westminster Live and replaced with new programmes.

The Politics Show become the Sunday flagship lunchtime politics show hosted by Jeremy Vine. The show retained On the Record's serious agenda and a long-form interview as its centrepiece and contained reports on the big political stories of the week as well as analysing the way these stories will affect people all over the country. The Politics Show also replaced a number of regional political programmes on BBC2, by including a 20-minute opt-out for each of the English regions, Scotland, Wales and Northern Ireland fronted by a different presenter for each region, looking into how political stories affect the local area.

In September 2005 Jeremy Vine left the show and was replaced by BBC News presenter Jon Sopel. Susanna Reid and Tim Donovan, deputy political editor James Landale and political correspondents Laura Kuenssberg and Jo Coburn have all presented in place of Sopel.

The programme aired for the final time on 11 December 2011. It was replaced from 15 January 2012 by Sunday Politics, a weekend version of The Daily Politics, with Andrew Neil as the main presenter.

== The Politics Show Scotland ==
The Politics Show Scotland was BBC Scotland's main political programme broadcast on Sundays. It followed the same format as the London version until a major overhaul of Scottish political programmes took place, which resulted in the axing of the Friday edition of Politics Scotland in 2007 and Holyrood in 2009 which were both presented by Iain Macwhirter, and incorporating them into the new programme. The new format resulted in Scotland taking the first 20-30min of the national broadcast then opting-out to provide a full one-hour show analysing the big political stories of the week in Scotland. The programme aired for the final time on 18 December 2011, with a review of 2011.

From 15 January 2012, The Politics Show was replaced by weekend version of The Daily Politics, hosted by Andrew Neil (who also hosts the weekday version on Wednesdays – Fridays). The programme was thus renamed Sunday Politics Scotland which continued with the same format.

=== Presenters ===
- Presenter/Holyrood correspondent: Isabel Frazer
- Political editor: Brian Taylor
- Reporter: Catriona Renton
- Holyrood correspondent: Raymond Buchanan
- Westminster correspondents: David Porter and Tim Reid
- Original Presenter: Glenn Campbell 2003 – 2007, Iain Macwhirter 2007 – 2008

== Regional opt-out teams ==
=== Yorkshire and Lincolnshire ===
- Presenter/political editor: Tim Iredale

N.B. The Yorkshire and Lincolnshire opt-out is broadcast to both Yorkshire and Yorkshire and Lincolnshire sub-regions.

=== East ===
- Presenter: Amelia Reynolds
- Political editor: Deborah McGurran
- Reporter: Clive Lewis

=== East Midlands ===
- Presenter: Marie Ashby
- Political editor: John Hess
- Reporter: Robin Powell

=== Wales/Cymru ===
- Presenter: Felicity Evans
- Political editor: Betsan Powys
- Reporters: Mark Hannaby (Videojournalist), John Stevenson (Bangor)

and Bethan James (Westminster)

- Online journalist: John Cooper
- Producer: Mark Palmer

=== London ===
- Reporter: Andrew Cryan
- Producer: Ian Laughlin

=== North East & Cumbria ===
- Presenter/political editor : Richard Moss
- Producer: Michael Wild
- Political correspondent: Mark Denten
- Reporters: Emily Unia, Luke Walton and Fergus Hewison

=== North West ===
- Presenter: Annabel Tiffin
- Political editor: Arif Ansari
- Reporters: Lucy Breakwell and Elaine Dunkley
- Producer: Michelle Mayman

=== South ===
- Presenter/political editor: Peter Henley
- Producer: Ian Paul

=== South East ===
- Presenters: Natalie Graham and Julia George
- Political editor: Louise Stewart
- Reporter: Helen Drew 1
- Producer: Jaswinder Bancil

=== South West ===
- Presenter/political editor: Martyn Oates
- Reporter/researcher: Ben Woolvin
- Producer: Jimmi Jones

=== West ===
- Presenter: David Garmston
- Reporter: Paul Barltrop

=== West Midlands ===
- Presenter/political editor: Patrick Burns
- Reporter: Susana Mendonça
- Producer: Nicholas Watson

=== Northern Ireland ===
The Northern Irish version usually followed the UK with a 20-minute opt out and returning for the final 10 minutes. Occasionally when there are big stories in Northern Ireland or election debates, they broadcast for the full hour and do not show the London edition. They also broadcast the full 20-minute NI edition after the late night news on a Sunday evening usually 10.20pm to 10.40pm.

- Presenter: Tara Mills (2011–present – hosted Politics Show for four months after Fitzpatrick's departure and continues on the Sunday Politics in 2012. Also hosts Stormont today for BBC NI)
- Former presenter – Jim Fitzpatrick (2003–2011 – left after 2011 election to become Business Editor on BBC Newsline but is still on the Sunday Politics production team)
- Political editor: Mark Davenport
- Political correspondents: Gareth Gordon, Yvette Shapero and Martina Purdy
