= 2010 United Kingdom general election debates =

| Gordon Brown | | |
| Gordon Brown Labour | David Cameron Conservative | Nick Clegg Liberal Democrats |
| | 2010 | 2015 debates → |

The United Kingdom general election debates of 2010 consisted of a series of three leaders' debates between the leaders of the three main parties contesting the 2010 general election: Gordon Brown, Prime Minister and leader of the Labour Party; David Cameron, Leader of the Opposition and Conservative Party; and Nick Clegg, leader of the third largest political party in the UK, the Liberal Democrats. They were the first such debates to be broadcast live in the run-up to a UK election.

The debates ran without a break for 90 minutes and were broadcast weekly by ITV, BSkyB and the BBC over three successive Thursday evenings starting on 15 April. They were moderated by Alastair Stewart, Adam Boulton and David Dimbleby respectively. The first half of each debate focused on a particular theme (domestic, international and economic affairs), before general issues were discussed. The questions were not disclosed to the leaders before the debate.

In addition to the leaders' debates, on 29 March, the three main parties' financial spokesmen participated in a debate focusing on the economy, with the Chancellor of the Exchequer Alistair Darling debating with the Shadow Chancellor George Osborne and Liberal Democrats' Treasury spokesman Vince Cable on Channel 4. Debates also took place between 19 April and 5 May, a series of debates also took place on the BBC political TV series The Daily Politics, between members of the incumbent Labour Cabinet and their Conservative, Liberal Democrat counterparts and representatives from the Green Party, the Scottish National Party, Plaid Cymru and the UK Independence Party.

Debates were also held in Scotland and Wales and Northern Ireland, due to the devolved nature of various aspects of government in Scotland, Wales and Northern Ireland. In Scotland and Wales, representatives of three main parties were joined by respective nationalist party representatives who stand MPs only in Scotland and Wales, while in Northern Ireland, due to the main parties having no seats, debates were held between the four largest Northern Irish parties. The arrangements for the UK-wide leaders debates were criticised for being restricted to the main UK parties excluding other national minor parties and nationalist parties in Scotland and Wales, for covering many domestic matters which are devolved from Westminster, and also for being held in three locations solely in England.

== History ==
During the 1960 United States presidential debates, Harold Macmillan told a BBC executive that a prime minister would be foolish to publicly debate a leader of the opposition, as only the opposition would benefit.

A proposal for leaders' debates was first mooted at the 1964 general election when Harold Wilson challenged then Prime Minister Alec Douglas-Home to an election debate. Home rejected the proposal on the grounds that: "You'll get a sort of Top of the Pops contest. You'll then get the best actor as leader of the country and the actor will be prompted by a scriptwriter" Wilson himself rejected Edward Heath's proposal for debates, worried about the unpredictability of such a debate and not wishing to give Heath exposure as a potential Prime Minister.

In 1979, James Callaghan became the first incumbent Prime Minister to agree to a debate, but the idea was rejected by Margaret Thatcher on the grounds that presidential-style debates were alien to Britain. The proposed 1979 debates were put forward by former Labour MP turned broadcaster Brian Walden and would have been produced by LWT and shown on ITV on 22 & 29 April 1979. While Callaghan had immediately accepted Walden's proposal, Thatcher decided to "wait a few days before replying", with some of her advisers concerned that she had more to lose from such debates, fearing that it would lead to a "presidential-style 'Her or me' campaign" which would see policy issues become of less important. At the insistence of the Liberals, their leader David Steel was also invited to take part in the debates, and accepted the offer. However on 3 April, Mrs Thatcher wrote to LWT to decline the offer to take part, saying that the election was for a government, not a president, which meant that the debates did not go ahead.

Both Thatcher and her successor as Prime Minister, John Major, rejected Labour leader Neil Kinnock's debate proposal, with Major commenting that "every party politician that expects to lose tries that trick of debates and every politician who expects to win says no."

However at the 1997 general election, Major then called for similar debates, which did not take place as the political parties and the broadcasters could not agree on a format acceptable to all sides in the time available. Since 1997, Prime Minister Tony Blair and his successor Gordon Brown had argued that the weekly Prime Minister's Questions in the House of Commons was sufficient. For the 2001 general election Tony Blair turned down a debate with William Hague. On 28 April 2005, Tony Blair, Michael Howard and Charles Kennedy took part in a special edition of the BBC's Question Time, although they did not debate directly, and were questioned individually by host David Dimbleby.

The idea of holding leaders debates for the 2010 election was first supported by David Cameron and Nick Clegg, with Gordon Brown later agreeing. In 2009, Sky News began a campaign for leaders debates which was followed by a joint proposal from the BBC, ITV and BSkyB to stage three live election debates between leaders of the three main political parties, one debate for each broadcaster.

On 21 December 2009, agreement was reached between the three main parties and the three broadcasters, BBC, ITV and BSkyB, on the key principles behind holding live election debates for the 2010 election campaign. On 1 March 2010 a set of 76 detailed rules for the leaders debates were announced.

== Leaders' debates ==
=== Principles and rules ===
The December 2009 key principles agreed were that the three main party leaders would appear together in three separate live television debates, and be given equal treatment. The debates would be held during three weeks of the election campaign, or over two weeks if there was less than four weeks between the election being called and polling day. Each broadcaster would produce one debate using the same format, ITV first from the North West, Sky from the South/South West, and finally the BBC from the Midlands.

Broadcasts would be between 85 and 90 minutes in duration with half focused on a specific theme. There would be no commercial breaks and each debate would take place in peak time. ITV was required to make their transmission available simultaneously online and to radio, and to other television broadcasters immediately after the programme, while BSkyB and the BBC were to make their programmes available to other broadcasters simultaneously.

In March 2010, 76 separate rules governing the programmes were published, along with the names of the members of the three editorial panels which would be selecting audience questions for each broadcaster. The rules specified how the audience was to be selected and presented on television, what role the audience would play in the debate, the structure of the programme, the role of the moderator and the layout of the set. In addition, it specified the three themes and their order: Domestic affairs, International affairs and Economic affairs, drawn by lots by the broadcasters.

=== Audience and question selection ===
The audience for each debate is made up of around 200 people selected by polling company ICM mainly from within a 30-mile radius of the venue and a broadly demographic cross section of the country. The audience is selected to ensure that at least 80% declare a voting intent, with the final selection to ensure a ratio of 7:7:5 between Labour, Conservative and Liberal Democrat voters and also including those showing a voting preference for minor parties.

Each broadcaster's selection panel pre-select the debate questions from suggestions made by the ICM selected audience, as well as selecting a maximum of four questions from suggestions submitted by the general public from around the UK submitted by email and read out by the moderator, or read out in person as an extra audience member. In selecting questions, the panel take into account factors such as the prominence of certain issues in the campaign, the distinctiveness of the different parties' policies on election issues, voters' interest and issues relevant to the role of the Prime Minister.

=== Programme format ===
The leaders open the programme with a one-minute statement, and close with a one-and-a-half-minute speech, with the questions asked in between. The first part covers the theme subject and in the second half on any other subject. For both the themed and unthemed sections, the pre-selected questions are asked by the audience member, without deviation, and answered by each leader in turn for one minute each. They then have an additional minute in turn to respond to each other's answer. At the programme editor's discretion, following each question, there is a maximum of four minutes of free debate between the leaders. No audience applause is allowed during the programme. In the themed half of the debate, audience members can ask a maximum of three questions on each sub-theme, while in the unthemed portion, a maximum of two questions are allowed on the same subject.

=== Overview ===
| Title | Date | Channel | Location | Producer | Moderator | Main theme | Sub-themes |
|---|---|---|---|---|---|---|---|
| The First Election Debate Transcript | 15 April 2010; 20:30 | ITV; audio: BBC Radio 5 Live, LBC 97.3 | Granada Studios, Manchester | ITV Studios | Alastair Stewart | Domestic policy | National Health Service (England) (NHS); Education; Immigration; Law and Order; Family; Constitution; Trust in politics; Political reform |
| The Sky News Debate Transcript | 22 April 2010; 20:00 | Sky News, Sky News HD, Sky3, BBC Two (repeat), BBC News Channel, BBC Parliament (repeat), CNN, Al Jazeera English, Press TV; audio: BBC Radio 4, LBC 97.3 | Arnolfini, Bristol | British Sky Broadcasting | Adam Boulton | Foreign affairs | International relations; Afghanistan; Iraq; Iran; Middle East; UK defence; International terrorism; Europe; United States; Climate change; China; International Development |
| The Prime Ministerial Debate Transcript | 29 April 2010; 20:30 | BBC One, BBC HD, BBC News Channel, BBC World News, BBC Parliament, Sky News, CNN; audio: BBC Radio 4, LBC 97.3 | The Great Hall, University of Birmingham | BBC | David Dimbleby | Economic affairs | Financing of public services; Taxation; Debt; Deficit; Public finances; Recession; Recovery; Banking and finance; Business; Pensions; Jobs |

=== First Election Debate: domestic affairs ===
Instant polling following the first debate showed Nick Clegg as the winner, with most showing David Cameron came second and Gordon Brown last:

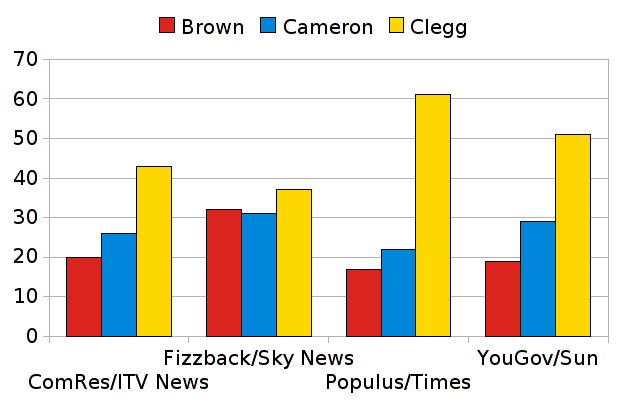
Results of opinion polls asking voters whom they considered to have won the first debate

- ITV News/ComRes: 43% for Clegg, 26% for Cameron, 20% for Brown
- Sky News/Fizzback: 37% for Clegg, 32% for Brown, 31% for Cameron
- Times/Populus: 61% for Clegg, 22% for Cameron and 17% for Brown
- Sun/YouGov: 51% for Clegg, 29% for Cameron, 19% for Brown
- Angus Reid Public Opinion: 49% for Clegg, 20% for Cameron, 18% for Brown

Average viewing figures for the debate were 9.4 million, with a peak of 10.3 million, equivalent to a share of the audience of 37%. The BARB produced audience figures indicated that the total television audience for the event on ITV was 9,679,000 viewers. The debates caused a large, immediate, and unexpected impact on opinion polls in favour of the Liberal Democrats, leading to many headlines regarding a 'Yellow Surge'.

Commenting on the debates, the leaders of three minor parties who were not invited to participate were disparaging. SNP Leader Alex Salmond said, "You had three Westminster politicians who agree with each other on 99% of issues, and therefore the debate couldn't really come alive because of that convergence on the things that matter, and also, of course, because the audience weren't allowed to really participate." Former UK Independence Party leader Nigel Farage said there was not a "single memorable phrase" in the entire debate and Plaid Cymru leader Ieuan Wyn Jones said: "In what was a very sterile debate, not once did we hear the word Wales mentioned by any of the leaders. Indeed much of what they said was irrelevant to our communities."

Both Gordon Brown and David Cameron agreed that Nick Clegg did well in the debate. Brown said Clegg had been "introducing himself in many ways to the public, in a mass way, for the first time. I think he'll be rightly pleased with his performance. I think at the end of the day... when all the dust settles, when people start sort of examining what are the policies, I don't think people know much about Liberal policies, and I think they do know more about our policies". He said he had "enjoyed" the debate, adding: "I think it's part of the debate we should have in Britain. I think it's energised the campaign."

Cameron said, "I think he had a good debate but I must say I just enjoyed being able to talk to people at home, to address the questions that I think are the big questions at this election like immigration and the economy and crime." His colleague Michael Gove told Sky News that Clegg could "play the role of the sparky and feisty outsider."

Clegg said it had been an "important moment in this campaign" while one of his predecessors, Lord Ashdown, said the debate was "potentially a game changer." BBC political editor Nick Robinson said the emergence of Clegg as a serious player would be the most significant development. He added that, amid predictions of a hung parliament in which Clegg's party could hold the balance of power, the Lib Dems would be "wooed, attacked and scrutinised with renewed vigour." The body language expert for Sky News Dr. Peter Collet revealed that Clegg had been the strongest as he looked down the lens, he also revealed that Cameron had been weaker than suspected as he stepped away from his podium.

=== Sky News Debate: international affairs ===
Prior to the debate, several hundred demonstrators gathered close to the Arnolfini, including anti-capitalist groups, Palestine groups and some English Defence League members. Between six and nine demonstrators were arrested before the debate for public order offences, as demonstrators clashed with Avon and Somerset Police with shields and horse-mounted officers.

Authorities had tried unsuccessfully to keep the location of the debate secret from the public before the broadcast, however three days before the event, security barriers had already been put up outside the venue, with around a dozen television production staff on site. Bristol City Council attached notices to the security barriers giving advice of traffic restrictions in the Bristol Harbour area.

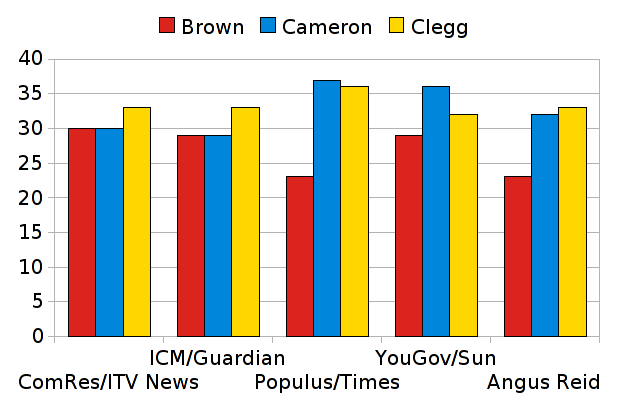
Results of opinion polls asking voters who they considered to have won the second debate

Polling following the Sky News Debate declared Nick Clegg and David Cameron the joint winners, with all three leaders considerably closer than the previous debate.

- ITV News/ComRes: 33% for Clegg, 30% for Cameron, 30% for Brown.
- The Guardian/ICM: 33% for Clegg, 29% for Cameron, 29% for Brown
- The Times/Populus: 37% for Cameron, 36% for Clegg and 23% for Brown
- The Sun/YouGov: 36% for Cameron, 32% for Clegg and 29% for Brown
- Angus Reid Public Opinion: 33% for Clegg, 32% for Cameron, 23% for Brown

The total viewing figures for the debate were 4 million, with 2.1 million viewers watching the Sky News coverage. The viewing figures produced by BARB showed that the viewing figures for the debate were 2,212,000 viewers watching it on Sky News, 584,000 on Sky3 and 1,388,000 watching it on BBC News.

Nick Clegg said of the debate, "I thought it went well. I enjoyed it a lot", while David Cameron commented "It was great, there were some very good questions. I enjoyed it. The main thing is the people will decide. I hope they will vote for change on May 6 and we can do something to change our country."

=== Prime Ministerial Debate: economic affairs ===
The final round of the first ever televised leaders' debates, hosted by the BBC, was held in the Great Hall of Birmingham University on 29 April 2010. The background to the debate was overshadowed a day before by a remark made by Gordon Brown in private, while being driven away after canvassing in Rochdale, when he met retired council worker Gillian Duffy. In the remark, caught by a lapel microphone, Brown said that "...she was just a sort of bigoted woman who said she used to be Labour". At the beginning of the debate, Brown mentioned the gaffe by saying "There's a lot to this job and as you saw yesterday I don't get all of it right."

The snap polls following the debate showed David Cameron as the winner of the debate, with most showing Nick Clegg in second, one showing Cameron and Clegg tied for first, and one showing Brown in second.

- The Sun/You Gov: 41% for Cameron, 32% for Clegg, and 25% for Brown
- ITV/ComRes: 35% for Cameron, 33% for Clegg, and 26% for Brown
- Angus Reid: 37% for Cameron, 29% for Clegg, and 23% for Brown
- The Times/Populus: 38% each for Cameron and Clegg and 25% for Brown
- The Guardian/ICM: 35% for Cameron, 29% for Brown, and 27% for Clegg

The viewing figures produced by BARB showed that the total viewing audience was 8,596,000 viewers, with 7,428,000 viewers watching it live on BBC One, 618,000 on BBC News, 337,000 on Sky News and 213,000 on BBC HD.

Gary Gibbon, political editor for Channel 4 News, has questioned the methods employed by YouGov and ComRes. YouGov "tend to include more prosperous voters, more broadsheet readers, older voters, who are slightly more Conservative and sometimes more male-dominated than the voting population as a whole." While ComRes polled people who expressed their voting preference as 35 per cent Conservative, 24 per cent Labour and 36 per cent Liberal Democrat. "And here's how those same people voted on the instant poll on who performed best in the debate: 35 per cent Cameron, 26 per cent Brown and 33 per cent Clegg." Therefore, the result showed that, compared with their previous voting intention, after the debate Clegg had lost 3%, Brown had gained 2%, and Cameron's support was unchanged.

In the analysis of psephologist John Curtice, "... ComRes found that 73 per cent of Conservative supporters reckoned Mr Cameron had won, 64 per cent of Liberal Democrats thought Mr Clegg had won, and 68 per cent of Labour supporters thought Mr Brown had won."

About uncommitted voters, Curtice wrote, "Among this group it appears it was Mr Clegg who scored a narrow victory. On average, across the four polls that have published the necessary details, 34 per cent thought Mr Clegg did best, while Mr Cameron's score of 27 per cent was even lower than Mr Brown's 28 per cent."

== Ask the Chancellors debate ==
| Title | Date | Channel | Location | Producer | Moderator | Main theme | Sub-themes |
|---|---|---|---|---|---|---|---|
| Ask the Chancellors | 29 March 2010; 20:00 | Channel 4 | The London Studios, London | ITN/Mentorn Media for Channel 4 | Krishnan Guru-Murthy | Economic affairs | The public finances, spending cuts, tax rises, banks, bankers' bonuses, bank regulation and jobs |

| Vince Cable Liberal Democrats | Alistair Darling Labour | George Osborne Conservative |

Ask the Chancellors, also known as the Battle of the Chancellors, was a debate between the parties' financial spokesmen, Alistair Darling (the incumbent Chancellor of the Exchequer), George Osborne (Conservative) and Vince Cable (Liberal Democrats) took place on Monday 29 March on Channel 4. Lasting for 60 minutes, it featured the three men taking questions from a studio audience. This debate was chaired by ITN's Channel 4 News presenter and journalist Krishnan Guru-Murthy.

The viewing figures for the debate were 1.8 million, 7.7% share of the television audience, rising to 2.1 million in the final 10 minutes of the debate. A spokeswoman for Channel 4 was said to be "really pleased" with the figures.

An online poll conducted by Channel 4 after the debate, gave Cable 36% support, with Darling and Osborne both with 32%.

== Daily Politics debates ==
The Daily Politics, a BBC political TV series, held a series of debates between members of the incumbent Labour Cabinet and their Conservative and Liberal Democrat equivalents. Starting on Monday 19 April, there were nine debates held on Mondays, Tuesdays and Wednesdays for the three weeks before 6 May. Andrew Neil acted as moderator, along with a specialist BBC correspondent.

| Title | Date | Correspondent | Labour | Conservative | Liberal Democrat | Other (if applicable) |
|---|---|---|---|---|---|---|
| The Foreign Affairs Debate | 19 April | Mark Urban | David Miliband | William Hague | Ed Davey | |
| The Crime Debate | 20 April | Mark Easton | Alan Johnson | Chris Grayling | Chris Huhne | |
| The Chancellors' Debate | 21 April | Stephanie Flanders | Alistair Darling | George Osborne | Vince Cable | |
| The Environment Debate | 26 April | Justin Rowlatt | Ed Miliband | Greg Clark | Simon Hughes | Cllr Darren Johnson AM (Green) |
| The Business Debate | 27 April | Robert Peston | Peter Mandelson | Kenneth Clarke | John Thurso | John Swinney MSP (SNP) |
| The Health Debate | 28 April | Branwen Jeffreys | Andy Burnham | Andrew Lansley | Norman Lamb | |
| The Education Debate | 3 May | Mike Baker | Ed Balls | Michael Gove | David Laws | |
| The Immigration Debate | 4 May | Mark Easton | Phil Woolas | Damian Green | Tom Brake | Nigel Farage (UKIP) |
| The Trust in Politics Debate | 5 May | Jo Coburn | Harriet Harman | Sir George Young | Lynne Featherstone | Adam Price (Plaid Cymru) |

== National debates of Northern Ireland, Scotland and Wales ==
=== Exclusion controversy ===
Other parties criticised the decision to hold television debates, the Scottish National Party (SNP) which forms the devolved Scottish Government, had insisted that as the leading political party in Scotland in the latest opinion poll, it should be included in any debate broadcast in Scotland, adding "The broadcasters would do well to recall the debacle experienced by the BBC’s Panorama programme in 1995, when they were forced not to broadcast an interview with the Prime Minister in Scotland because it breached the rules of impartiality during a Scottish local election." On 22 December 2009, the UK Independence Party (UKIP) leader, Lord Pearson stated that his party should be included because it "would be wrong for UKIP, which came second in the last test of national political opinion, to be excluded from these debates."

The SNP had threatened to prevent any such debates being screened in Scotland should its leader not be included. On 25 April they announced that they now planned to raise the £50,000 that would allow them to proceed with legal action over the third and final Prime Ministerial debate on BBC One on Thursday, despite the fact that the SNP had mounted no legal challenge to either ITV or Sky Television for their decision to not include the SNP. The party said it was not trying to stop the final broadcast, but that it wanted an SNP politician included "for balance". The party's leader, Alex Salmond said it would be "unacceptable" for the SNP to be excluded from the debate, and sought "guarantees of inclusion from the broadcasters, given their inescapable duty to ensure fairness and impartiality in election-related coverage in Scotland" in the buildup to the general election. The party used the Freedom of Information Act to determine whether the BBC could have broken its own rules. Salmond said it is entirely unacceptable to Scotland as well as to the SNP for the broadcasters to exclude the party that forms the Scottish Government and leading in Westminster election polls. The legal challenge duly went ahead at the Court of Session in Edinburgh. Despite earlier reassurances by the SNP that it was not trying to stop the broadcast, it sought an 'interim interdict' to prevent the debate being broadcast without the participation of the SNP. However, on 28 April 2010, the Court of Session dismissed the SNP's complaint, and refused to prevent the BBC from broadcasting the third debate in Scotland, on the grounds that the SNP had left the bringing of the case "far too late", had not contested the broadcasting of the first two debates by ITV and Sky Television, and that the third debate would in any case be broadcast by Sky on satellite across the UK, which a Scottish court had no power to block. The judge, Lady Smith, further ordered the SNP to pay the BBC's legal expenses. The SNP's political opponents described the SNP's contesting of the case as a "stunt".

However, there were Scottish debates dealing with specifically devolved issues which Salmond had accepted the invitation to attend along the other parties within the Scottish Parliament on Sky TV. Whilst Salmond declined to attend those held on the BBC and ITV, Angus Robertson agreed to take his place in these debates.

UKIP, which is a smaller party, but came second in the 2009 European elections, complained about having been denied a chance to appear in the televised debates. TV companies agreed the deal based on which parties were standing across Great Britain and already have existing seats in the House of Commons. The Green Party, UKIP, the SNP and Plaid Cymru all protested.

On the announcement of the UK party leader debates, it was also announced there would be separate debates between the main parties of Scotland, Northern Ireland and Wales. The BBC would broadcast these on their respective BBC national region channels, BBC Scotland, BBC Northern Ireland and BBC Wales, and across the UK on the BBC News Channel.

=== Debates in Northern Ireland ===
In Northern Ireland, neither Labour or the Liberal Democrats stand for election, while the Conservatives in Northern Ireland have no seats (although they are allied to the Ulster Unionist Party), either in the Northern Ireland Assembly or Westminster. Therefore, the two Northern Ireland debates were held between representatives of the four main Northern Ireland parties:

- Peter Robinson MP MLA, Leader of the Democratic Unionist Party, First Minister of Northern Ireland in the Northern Ireland Assembly, and MP and Assembly Member for Belfast East
- Gerry Adams MP MLA, Leader of Sinn Féin and MP and Assembly Member for Belfast West (albeit practising abstentionism from the Westminster Parliament)
- Sir Reg Empey MLA, Leader of the Ulster Unionist Party, Minister for Employment and Learning in the Northern Ireland Assembly, and Assembly Member for Belfast East and UCUNF candidate in South Antrim
- Margaret Ritchie MLA, Leader of the Social Democratic and Labour Party (SDLP), Minister for Social Development in the Northern Ireland Assembly, and Assembly Member and SDLP candidate for South Down

| Title | Date | Channel | Location | Producer | Moderator | Themes |
|---|---|---|---|---|---|---|
| UTV Leaders Debate | 22 April 2010; 21:00 | UTV; Repeated on BBC Parliament | Havelock House, Belfast | UTV | Jim Dougal | Jobs, financial security, health, education, public sector budget and jobs, policing and justice |
| The NI Leaders' Debate | 4 May 2010; 21:00 | BBC One Northern Ireland; Repeated on BBC News Channel | BBC Blackstaff House, Belfast | BBC Northern Ireland | Mark Carruthers | Hung parliament, abstentionism, electoral pacts, security, devolved justice and MPs expenses |

=== Debates in Scotland ===
The Scottish debates took place between:

- Jim Murphy, (Labour), the Secretary of State for Scotland and MP for East Renfrewshire
- David Mundell, (Conservatives), the Shadow Secretary of State for Scotland and MP for Dumfriesshire, Clydesdale and Tweeddale
- Alistair Carmichael, the Liberal Democrat Spokesman on Northern Ireland and Scotland and MP for Orkney and Shetland
- Angus Robertson, the SNP Westminster Group Parliamentary leader and MP for Moray. He took part in the STV and BBC Scotland debates
- Alex Salmond, leader of the SNP, First Minister of Scotland, MP for Banff and Buchan and MSP for Gordon. He took part in the Sky News debate

Note that these are the Scottish representatives of the respective parties in Westminster, rather than the leaders of the parties in Scotland, who campaign for seats in the Scottish Parliament, namely the leader of the Scottish Labour Party – Iain Gray MSP and leader of the Scottish Liberal Democrats – Tavish Scott MSP and leader of the Scottish Conservative Party – Annabel Goldie MSP, although the leader of the Scottish National Party and First Minister of Scotland – Alex Salmond MP MSP took part in the Sky News debate.

| Title | Date | Channel | Location | Producer | Moderator | Themes |
|---|---|---|---|---|---|---|
| Scotland Debates | 20 April 2010; 21:00 | STV and ITV Border; Repeated on BBC Parliament | National Piping Centre, Glasgow | STV | John MacKay | The economy, MPs' expenses, war in Afghanistan, the occupation of Iraq and the possibility of a hung parliament. |
| Sky News Scotland Debate | 25 April 2010; 10:30 | Sky News, Sky News HD | The Hub, Edinburgh | British Sky Broadcasting | Adam Boulton | Jobs, banking, public spending, tax and civil liberties. |
| The Scottish Leaders' Debate | 2 May 2010; 21:00 | BBC One Scotland; Repeated on BBC News Channel | Festival Theatre, Edinburgh | BBC Scotland | Glenn Campbell | Public sector pay, tax, immigration and Afghanistan. |

=== Debates in Wales ===
The Welsh debates featured a mixture of Welsh party representatives in Westminster for Labour and Conservatives, and party representatives at the National Assembly for Wales for the Liberal Democrats, Plaid Cymru and the Conservatives, with Nick Bourne in the BBC debate only, with debates occurring between:

- Nick Bourne, AM, Leader of the Welsh Conservative Party in the National Assembly for Wales and Leader of the Opposition, took part in the BBC debate
- Cheryl Gillan MP, (Conservatives) Shadow Secretary of State for Wales and MP for Chesham and Amersham, took part in the Sky News and ITV debates
- Peter Hain MP, (Labour), the Secretary of State for Wales and MP for Neath
- Ieuan Wyn Jones AM, Leader of Plaid Cymru, Deputy First Minister of Wales in the National Assembly for Wales, and Assembly Member for Ynys Môn
- Kirsty Williams AM, Leader of the Welsh Liberal Democrats and Assembly Member for Brecon and Radnorshire

Note that Carwyn Jones AM, is the First Minister of Wales in the National Assembly for Wales and the leader of Welsh Labour.

| Title | Date | Channel | Location | Producer | Moderator | Themes |
|---|---|---|---|---|---|---|
| Sky News Wales Debate | 18 April 2010; 10:30 | Sky News and Sky News HD | Coal Exchange, Cardiff | British Sky Broadcasting | Adam Boulton | The economy, immigration, foreign affairs and trust in MPs. |
| Welsh Leaders' Debate | 20 April 2010; 21:00 | ITV Wales | Coal Exchange, Cardiff | ITV Wales | Jonathan Hill | The war in Afghanistan, petrol prices and the Barnett formula. |
| Welsh Leaders' Debate | 2 May 2010; 21:00 | BBC One Wales; Repeated on BBC News Channel | Pontardawe; Leisure Centre | BBC Wales | Betsan Powys | Public spending, immigration and the possibility of a hung parliament. |

== See also ==
- Politics of the United Kingdom
- 2010 United Kingdom general election
