= Paola Buonadonna =

Italian journalist

- Born: Paola Buonadonna; Naples, Italy
- Education: University of Edinburgh
- Occupations: Journalist, Presenter, Reporter
- Notable credit: The Politics Show

Paola Buonadonna is an Italian journalist and communications consultant based in the United Kingdom. She is known for her reports on current affairs affecting the United Kingdom on a variety of BBC programmes including On the Record and the Politics Show. She is the author of Leaving Azzurro Behind: the Journey of a Reluctant Brit, a memoir of her life in the UK.[1]

== Early life ==
Buonadonna was born in Naples, and raised in Genoa, Italy to Italian parents. She attended primary and secondary school in Genoa before finishing her education at the University of Edinburgh, Scotland.

== Career ==
After a spell as a newspaper reporter in Brussels, writing about the EU institution, she moved back to London to become a reporter on the BBC program The E-Files and has since worked for On the Record and for Politics Show where she reported on both domestic and European stories. After leaving the BBC in 2010 she was head of press for the European Parliament Office in the UK and since then has worked as a media consultant for a variety of organizations and campaigns including British Influence and the Centre for European Reform. In September 2015 she joined The Wake Up Foundation, an educational charity, and helped create and run their Wake Up Europe! campaign. She is currently the Head of Communications and Engagement at the National Institute of Economic and Social Research, NIESR.
