= Daily Politics =

Former BBC political television programme

- Genre: Politics; Current affairs
- Directed by: Claire Bellis
- Presented by: Andrew Neil (2003–2018); Daisy McAndrew (2003–2005); Jenny Scott (2005–2008); Anita Anand (2008–2011); Jo Coburn (2008–2018); Shelagh Fogarty (2010)
- Theme music composer: Jim Meacock (2003–2011); George Fenton (2012–2018)
- Country of origin: United Kingdom
- Original language: English
- No. of episodes: 2700 (Daily Politics); 210 (Sunday Politics)

Production
- Production locations: BBC Millbank (Monday–Friday); Broadcasting House (Sunday); Palace of Westminster (Weds PMQs)
- Editor: Robbie Gibb
- Running time: 60 minutes (Mon–Fri); 90 minutes (Wed); 75 Minutes (Sunday); 25 Minutes (BBC World News)

Original release
- Network: BBC Two (Monday–Friday); BBC One (Sunday); BBC World News (Europe only)
- Release: 8 January 2003 – 24 July 2018

Related
- Westminster Live; BBC Politics Live; This Week

Daily Politics is a BBC Television programme which aired between 6 January 2003 and 24 July 2018, presented by Andrew Neil and Jo Coburn. Daily Politics took an in-depth review of the daily events in both Westminster and other areas across Britain and abroad, and included interviews with leading politicians and political commentators.

The final episode of Daily Politics broadcast was on 24 July 2018. On 2 September 2018 it was replaced by BBC Politics Live. However, the regional opt-out edition, Sunday Politics, continued as a Sunday morning talk show until 27 December 2020. The Sunday Politics brand continues to be used in Northern Ireland.

== History ==
On 1 September 2000, Greg Dyke, then Director-General of the BBC, ordered a review of political output from the BBC, which was carried out by Fran Unsworth. This led to a major overhaul of political programming in 2003. Several flagship programmes were cancelled, including On the Record, Despatch Box and Westminster Live, and new programmes were launched, including Daily Politics and the Politics Show.

Daily Politics first aired on Wednesday 8 January 2003, presented by Andrew Neil and Daisy Sampson. The first show included coverage of the first 12:00 noon session of Prime Minister's Questions in the House of Commons which later became standard in future.

In May 2008, the opening titles were revamped by Jonathan Spencer, the show's designer, using Adobe Illustrator and Cinema 4D.

On 3 October 2011, it was announced that from 9 January 2012 Daily Politics would be relaunched, broadcasting six days a week (Daily Politics – Monday to Friday and Sunday Politics on Sundays). The duration of Daily Politics was extended from 30 to 60 minutes on Mondays, Tuesdays, Thursdays and Fridays, remaining at 90 minutes on Wednesdays. Sunday Politics would become a weekend edition of Daily Politics presented by Andrew Neil and replacing The Politics Show, which ended in December 2011.

On 9 January 2013, the show celebrated its tenth anniversary showing archive clips from the Blair, Brown and Cameron years. It celebrated its 15th anniversary in January 2018.

Daily Politics was broadcast live at noon on weekdays on BBC Two when the House of Commons is sitting, lasting 60 minutes on Mondays, Tuesdays, Thursdays and Fridays. On Wednesdays the programme was extended to 90 minutes from 11.30 am and included live coverage and analysis of Prime Minister's Questions. Each show was repeated on BBC Parliament at midnight on the same day, and was available on BBC iPlayer for seven days. During party conference season, an additional programme covering the Party Leaders' speeches aired in the afternoons, and a highlights programme titled Today at Conference aired after Newsnight on BBC Two. During the 2010 general election, BBC Two ran nine, 45-minute Daily Politics election debates. These programmes were presented by Andrew Neil and a specialist BBC correspondent.

There was also a Northern Ireland version of Daily Politics, broadcast as Daily Politics from Northern Ireland, to cover Northern Ireland Minister's Questions from Westminster; it opted out of the national programme for the first half-hour before Prime Minister's Questions on a Wednesday, and this was usually presented by Connor Bradford.

== Presenters ==
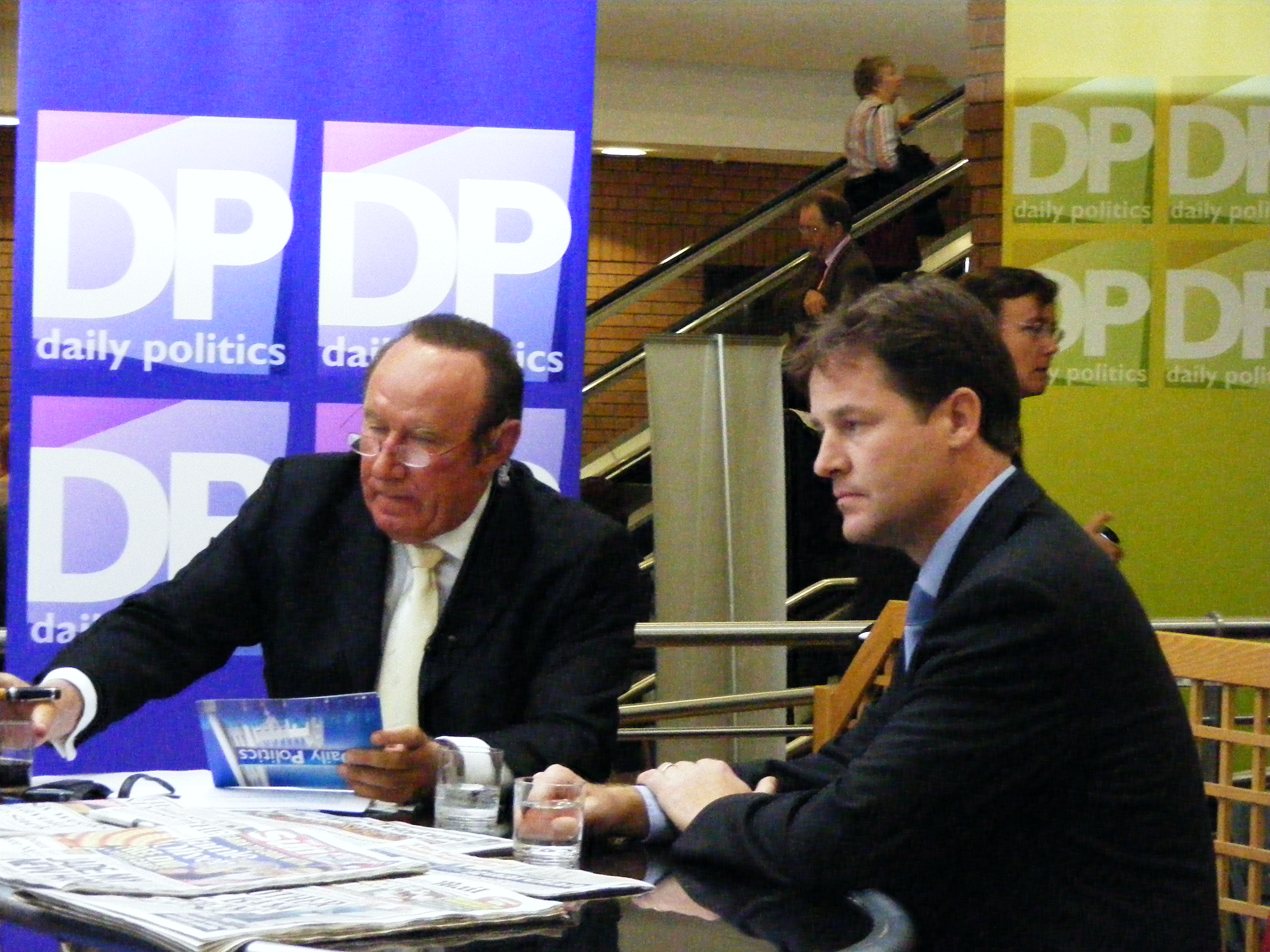
Nick Clegg being interviewed by Andrew Neil for the programme

Daisy McAndrew (née Sampson) was Neil's co-presenter until the summer of 2005 when she left to join ITV. Jenny Scott joined as her replacement; she left in June 2008 to join the Bank of England. Sally Magnusson joined briefly in 2005 as the sole presenter on Friday's episode. Anita Anand joined the programme as Jenny Scott's replacement in September 2008 with Jo Coburn presenting on Thursdays.

Shelagh Fogarty joined the team in January 2010 to co-host with Andrew Neil on Thursdays for three months after Anita Anand began maternity leave, while Jo Coburn took on Anita Anand's role presenting four days a week. At the beginning of April 2010, Jo Coburn went full-time presenting the programme every day. Anita Anand returned on 6 September 2010 and left the programme in July 2011.

When the programme returned on 5 September 2011, it was presented by Andrew Neil on Mondays, Jo Coburn on Fridays, and both together on Tuesdays, Wednesdays and Thursdays. As of January 2012, following the creation of Sunday Politics, Coburn presented Monday to Thursday and Neil presented Wednesday to Friday. Following the break for Easter 2017, Coburn took over as the sole presenter on Thursdays and Fridays and Neil presented the Wednesday programme.

The regular reporters were Ellie Price, Elizabeth Glinka and Greg Dawson. Adam Fleming contributed regularly as a correspondent for the EU political situation in Brussels, having previously been a regular reporter for the programme at home. Other regular contributors to the show included either the BBC's Political Editor Laura Kuenssberg, her deputy John Pienaar or the BBC's Assistant Political Editor Norman Smith – who either helped to review Prime Minister's Questions on Wednesday's extended shows or contributed as correspondents for the programme.

== Production ==
Daily Politics was produced at the BBC's Millbank studios near the Palace of Westminster, but despite this convenient location, it was not unknown for MPs and guests to arrive late for their interviews; a social gaffe which Andrew Neil frequently reminded them of on subsequent appearances. However, on 17 May 2011, when the programme was rescheduled to an earlier slot of 11.30 am, Neil himself was caught in traffic and missed the entire programme, which had to be introduced solo by Anita Anand, with an empty chair alongside her. For a while from 1 September 2014, the programme was moved to Broadcasting House while the Westminster studio was renovated.

On 4 January 2016, Laura Kuenssberg arranged for Labour MP Stephen Doughty to announce his resignation on the show. This led to formal complaints.

Every Wednesday the programme featured an email competition where viewers answered a question for the chance to win a coveted Daily Politics mug. This competition was suspended as per BBC policy in the wake of the Blue Peter phone-in scandal. The competition returned in 2008 with entries picked out of a giant-sized Daily Politics mug instead of a normal mug (after initially using a Daily Politics bucket). Neither the enlarged mug nor the Daily Politics bucket were made available as a prize. The design of the mug changed in September 2008, after a relaunch of the programme. A new electronic method for choosing the winner was introduced in April 2012.

== Sunday Politics ==
This programme was launched on 15 January 2012 to replace the Politics Show and was presented by Andrew Neil until 2017. The network part of Sunday Politics was presented by Sarah Smith from 4 September 2017 until the final programme on 22 July 2018. It is currently continuing as a regional programme, without the networked coverage.

Sunday Politics was divided into a number of clearly defined sections. The programme usually starts with a short interview on a topical subject making the news that day. This section is branded the Top Story. The main programme interview (the Sunday Interview) is introduced by a short graphic and normally lasts between 10 and 15 minutes. The next section is Head to Head which is introduced by a short film and consists of a debate between two people on a political issue in the news that week. At this point the programme opted to 11 English regional segments, Scotland, Wales and Northern Ireland. Each opt-out lasted 23 minutes apart from Scotland (see below). Following the opt-outs the programme returned with a final section called The Week Ahead featuring three political journalists – regularly Janan Ganesh (Financial Times), Isabel Oakeshott (The Sunday Times), Helen Lewis (New Statesman) and Nick Watt (The Guardian) who later joined BBC's Newsnight.

On 6 November 2016, Neil presented from Washington with Coburn in London ahead of the 2016 United States presidential election. On 23 August 2017, Neil announced he was standing down and that BBC Scotland Editor Sarah Smith would take over as the main presenter.

- Editor: Will Boden
- Presenter: Sarah Smith
- Relief presenters: Jo Coburn (and occasionally Nick Robinson)
- Political correspondents: Ellie Price, Elizabeth Glinka, Greg Dawson

=== Sunday Politics (English regions) ===
There were 11 English regional editions (formerly opt-outs) on Sunday Politics. Each region followed a similar format, consisting of two political figures, normally MPs or MEPs, appearing for the whole 29 minutes; this is extended from 23 minutes when the programme was merely an opt-out. In addition, each regional segment had topical interviews and discussions, short films and a review of the political week in 60 seconds.

- Jo Coburn (London)
- Peter Henley (South)
- Julia George / Natalie Graham (South East)
- Martyn Oates (South West)
- Nina Warhurst, previously Arif Ansari (North West)
- Richard Moss (North East and Cumbria)
- Stewart White (East)
- Marie Ashby (East Midlands)
- Patrick Burns / Elizabeth Glinka (West Midlands)
- David Garmston (West)
- Tim Iredale (Yorkshire and Lincolnshire)

=== Sunday Politics Scotland ===
Sunday Politics Scotland was presented by Gordon Brewer or Andrew Kerr, and originally formed part of the networked Sunday Politics programme. Viewers in Scotland saw the first 37 minutes of the network programme (Top Story, Sunday Interview, and Head to Head) before opting to 38 minutes of analysis of the big political stories in Scotland. In its later years, the programme aired in a half-hour slot. The programme was replaced in February 2021 by "The Sunday Show", which is simulcast on both BBC One Scotland and BBC Radio Scotland for 30 minutes, continuing until noon on radio.

- Political editor: Brian Taylor
- Past presenters: Isabel Fraser, Gary Robertson

=== Sunday Politics Wales ===
The Welsh segment of Sunday Politics lasted 29 minutes (increased from 23 when it formed part of the national Sunday Politics programme). It follows a similar format to the English regional editions, with two political figures appearing for the whole 29 minutes and a weekly round up of the political week in 60 seconds.

- Presenter: Carl Roberts

=== Sunday Politics Northern Ireland ===
The Northern Ireland segment of Sunday Politics normally lasts 28 minutes (23 when it formed part of the overall Sunday Politics programme), but sometimes covers election debates and occasionally expanded to fill the whole Sunday Politics slot in Northern Ireland. In 2012, BBC NI put all its politics shows under the one production team, so Stormont Today, The View and Sunday Politics Northern Ireland are all presented by Mark Carruthers, who moved from Good Morning Ulster to be the face of politics on BBC NI, replacing Noel Thompson, who occupies Carruthers' former slot on Radio Ulster. Tara Mills hosts when Carruthers is unavailable. The Northern Ireland segment used to be repeated after the late night news on Sunday evenings, usually at 10.30 pm on BBC One NI, but from 2012 this has moved to BBC Two NI, at the same time as Match of the Day 2 is on BBC One.

- Presenter: Mark Carruthers (2012–) Tara Mills (2011–2012, 2013)
- Political editor: Mark Davenport
- Political correspondents: Gareth Gordon, Enda McLafferty

== Daily Politics election debates ==
During the run up to the 2010 general election Daily Politics held a series of debates involving members of the incumbent Labour Cabinet and their Conservative and Liberal Democrat equivalents. These debates ran alongside the main leaders' debates held for the first time in 2010. Starting on Monday 19 April, there were nine debates held on Mondays, Tuesdays and Wednesdays for the three weeks before 6 May. Andrew Neil acted as moderator, along with a specialist BBC correspondent.

Again in the run up to the 2015 general election, the programme again held a series of debates.

List of Debate episodes
Year	Date	Subject	Host	Correspondent	Conservative	Labour	Lib Dems	Green (E&W/SCO)	SNP	UKIP	Plaid Cymru
2010	19 April	Foreign Affairs	Andrew Neil	Mark Urban	William Hague	David Miliband	Ed Davey	—N/a	—N/a	—N/a	—N/a
2010	20 April	Crime	Andrew Neil	Mark Easton	Chris Grayling	Alan Johnson	Chris Huhne	—N/a	—N/a	—N/a	—N/a
2010	21 April	Chancellors	Andrew Neil	Stephanie Flanders	George Osborne	Alistair Darling	Vince Cable	—N/a	—N/a	—N/a	—N/a
2010	26 April	Environment	Andrew Neil	Justin Rowlatt	Greg Clark	David Miliband	Simon Hughes	Darren Johnson	—N/a	—N/a	—N/a
2010	27 April	Business	Andrew Neil	Robert Peston	Ken Clarke	Peter Mandelson	John Thurso	—N/a	John Swinney	—N/a	—N/a
2010	28 April	Health	Andrew Neil	Branwen Jeffreys	Andrew Lansley	Andy Burnham	Norman Lamb	—N/a	—N/a	—N/a	—N/a
2010	3 May	Education	Andrew Neil	Mike Baker	Michael Gove	Ed Balls	David Laws	—N/a	—N/a	—N/a	—N/a
2010	4 May	Immigration	Andrew Neil	Mark Easton	Damian Green	Phil Woolas	Tom Brake	—N/a	—N/a	Lord Pearson	—N/a
2010	5 May	Trust	Andrew Neil	Jo Coburn	George Young	Harriet Harman	Lynne Featherstone	—N/a	—N/a	—N/a	Adam Price

== Politics Europe ==
Politics Europe was launched on 14 September 2012 to replace The Record Europe and aired on BBC Parliament and BBC World News in Europe presented by Andrew Neil, although Jo Coburn acted as a relief presenter.

== See also ==
- This Week
