= BBC Parliament =

British parliamentary television channel

- Logo used since 2022
- Country: United Kingdom
- Broadcast area: United Kingdom, Isle of Man, and Channel Islands, reaching bordering regions via overspill of the British terrestrial network

Programming
- Language: English
- Picture format: Most programming: 576i SDTV (upscaled to 1080i for the HDTV feed); Some programmes: 1080i HDTV (Note: 1080i on Virgin Media only.) (downscaled to 576i for the SDTV feed)

Ownership
- Owner: BBC
- Sister channels: BBC One; BBC Two; BBC Three; BBC Four; BBC News; CBBC; CBeebies; BBC Scotland; BBC Alba

History
- Launched: 23 September 1998; 28 years ago

Links
- Website: bbc.co.uk/tv/bbcparliament

Availability

Terrestrial
- Freeview: Channel 232 (SD)

Streaming media
- BBC iPlayer: Watch live (UK only)

BBC Parliament is a British free-to-air public broadcast television channel from the BBC that showcases parliamentary content from across the United Kingdom. It broadcasts live and recorded coverage of the British Parliament (House of Commons, House of Lords and Select Committees), the Scottish Parliament, the Northern Ireland Assembly and the Senedd. When none of these chambers are sitting, the channel does not broadcast, and its feed is given over to a simulcast of the BBC News channel.

As of January 2022, the channel had a typical weekly peak of approximately 120,000 viewers, during Prime Minister's Questions, representing a monthly reach of 5.41% of UK TV households and 0.06% overall share.

== History ==
BBC Parliament logo used from 2008 to 2020

BBC Parliament logo used from 2020 to 2022 (and in television broadcasts until 2025)

John Reith, 1st Baron Reith, the first director-general of the BBC, wanted to broadcast Parliament on radio from the BBC's founding in 1922, but the government rejected the idea, as it did proposals from MPs during the 1920s and 1930s. During the Attlee government, a committee led by William Beveridge found that broadcasting parliament would be harmful.

A 1966 proposal to experiment with television broadcasts was defeated by one vote, a 1972 proposal by 26 votes, in 1974 by 25 votes, and in 1975 by 12 votes.

A one-month experiment in broadcasting parliament on radio began on 9 June 1975, and MPs on 16 March 1976 voted to continue. Permanent radio broadcasts from the House of Commons began on 3 April 1978, and from the House of Lords on 4 April. The 1979 vote of no confidence in the Callaghan ministry was among the important events broadcast live and through the 1980s, ad-hoc live coverage would be broadcast on BBC Radio 4s VHF frequencies with television broadcasts generally restricted to coverage of the Budget, with the audio feed accompanied by a live shot of Big Ben.

Television coverage of Parliament began in January 1985 when cameras were allowed inside the House of Lords and television coverage of the House of Commons began on 21 November 1989.

In 1991, United Artists Programming initiated a trial project to provide highlights of debates from Parliament in a programme called Yesterday in the Commons to cable networks across the UK. The trial was deemed to be a success and this led to United Artists Cable launching a full time service, The Parliamentary Channel, on 13 January 1992, to provide live and recorded coverage of the British Parliament. It also aired full live coverage of the September party conference season.

In 1998 the channel was purchased by the BBC and was relaunched on 23 September 1998 as BBC Parliament. This followed the launch three years earlier of a Digital Audio Broadcasting radio channel, from the Crystal Palace transmitting station, which had offered a relay of events in Parliament. This audio service became a relay of BBC Parliament when the channel launched, and continued until the DAB radio service was closed down on 14 November 2000.

Due to capacity limitations on the digital terrestrial television platform, now known as Freeview, from launch until 15 October 2002, the channel ran as "audio only". Then, from 14 October 2002 until 13 November 2006, the channel was only able to broadcast a quarter-screen picture. After receiving "thousands of angry and perplexed emails and letters", not to mention questions asked by MPs in the House itself, the BBC eventually found the bandwidth to make the channel full-screen. Viewers were advised to retune their TVs or set-top boxes to receive the full-screen version of BBC Parliament.

Until 2008, BBC Parliament was unique amongst the BBC channels in being broadcast using non-BBC facilities, with ITV's Millbank Studios in Westminster supplying the engineering and playout facilities. Production, editorial and journalism were, however, maintained by the BBC.

The previous idents, also based on a Big Ben clock motif, ran from 2009 to 2016. This replaced the channel's previous identity which was first introduced in 2002.

BBC Parliament was taken off the air during the 2012 Summer Olympics on Freeview in post-digital switchover areas to enable BBC Three to broadcast 24 hours a day. The BBC had done the same during the 2008 Summer Olympics as it used the space to provide an additional BBC Red Button option for Freeview users.

BBC Parliament HD has been confirmed as launching from 20 October 2021 and rolling out across various platforms at different times right up to the end of 2022, the standard definition service will continue on Freeview. This has been the case since 10 December 2013 when BBC Three, BBC Four, BBC News, CBBC, and CBeebies began high definition simulcasts.

On 5 September 2016 BBC Two began broadcasting BBC Parliament during BBC Two's overnight downtime. However this was short-lived and has subsequently been discontinued.

On 14 October 2016, the channel received a new look and new idents, its first revamp since 2009. The channel's current identity went live on Monday 10 October 2016 with refreshed music and idents based on clock workings, with colours and images derived from the flags and assemblies of the British home countries and the European Parliament.

In July 2018, the BBC announced that the output on the channel was to be cut back, discontinuing all programming produced for the channel other than parliamentary coverage, and closing the channel entirely during summer months when Parliament and the devolved assemblies are not sitting. The move has been criticised by many including the former House of Commons Speaker John Bercow. In October 2018, the BBC announced that it had shelved these plans.

From 26 July until 31 August 2021, for the first time BBC Parliament simulcast the BBC News channel during a parliamentary recess. This replaced the loop of highlights from the previous Parliamentary session. Starting to broadcast the BBC News Channel during the three major recesses was part of a range of cutbacks to the channel which saw the channel focus only on live and recorded coverage from Westminster and the devolved chambers. Coverage of the House of Lords and Select committees was also reduced. The channel's wider political coverage ended at this point. This saw the channel end its mostly live coverage of party conferences, its broadcasts of the BBC's national political shows, its Sunday lunchtime simulcast of C-SPAN and repeat of Question Time all finished, as did all archive programming. The bespoke highlights programmes The Day in Parliament and The Week in Parliament and all other programming made for the channel also ended at this point.

In April 2022, BBC Parliament began broadcasting in high-definition, initially only on the Virgin Media platform, BBC Parliament in HD came to Sky and Freesat in February 2023.

Following the death of Elizabeth II, the channel broadcast continuous coverage of the four days of Queen Elizabeth's lying in state.

== Programming ==
=== Regular programming ===
Whenever the House of Commons is sitting, BBC Parliament carries the chamber live without interruption, with any simultaneous House of Lords sitting being shown in full later the same day and the following morning, often in sections that fit around the sittings of the Commons. The House of Lords is broadcast live only on days when there is no House of Commons sitting scheduled. BBC Parliament also provides full, recorded coverage of the House of Commons' second chamber Westminster Hall during weekends, when they will also broadcast selected evidence sessions from different select committees of the House of Commons.

Whenever both Westminster chambers are in recess, but a devolved assembly is constituted, the channel will provide live coverage of its work, while during Westminster sessions, coverage of the devolved assemblies usually takes the form of highlights at the weekend of the previous week's main debates and business.

Thus, when taken together with both live and recorded coverage from the other bodies it covers, BBC Parliament's schedule is dominated by direct broadcasts of the legislative and political institutions, whether they be plenary, quasi-plenary (such as Westminster Hall), or in committees that affect British public life.

==== Election night ====
In the event of one of the devolved nations producing their own results programme on election night, normally the first Thursday in May, BBC Parliament will usually broadcast this telecast to the whole of the United Kingdom. On election night for the 2005, 2010, 2015, 2017 and 2019 general elections, BBC Parliament aired BBC Scotland's result night coverage. A few days afterwards, it would also broadcast a replay of election night coverage from BBC Wales and BBC Northern Ireland. In 2024, the channel aired the network coverage as broadcast as seen on the BBC News Channel due to the channel now carrying the BBC News Channel when none of the UK's Parliaments and Assemblies are sitting.

BBC Parliament had also carried BBC Scotland's coverage of both the 2011 devolved assembly elections and Scottish Independence Referendum. In March 2011 BBC Parliament simulcast BBC Wales's results coverage of the nation's devolution referendum.

==== Original programmes ====
Until July 2021, BBC Parliament often broadcast its own original programmes. They were either scheduled or used to fill gaps between the billed programmes, especially when live coverage of a legislative chamber ended before the next programme was due to start. The programmes covered a variety of political and parliamentary subjects, including:

- A to Z of Westminster – A series of short programmes presented by BBC Parliament researchers explaining some of the more common aspects of parliamentary protocol.
- Britain's Best Buildings – Only the episode that features the Palace of Westminster was broadcast, usually edited down into short segments that focused on one specific feature of the palace.
- Conversations – Conversations with political figures about their lives and careers, with Parliamentary Correspondent Sean Curran.
- Election File – Short summaries of previous general election results, including short bursts of the BBC's original television coverage.
- In House – A new strand of programmes that replaced A-Z of Westminster in 2011. The programmes were similar in function to their predecessor series, seeking to explain some of the strange procedures that occur in Parliament.
- Laws and Ladies – A topical chat show, featuring a panel of peers discussing the political issues of the day. Peers featured included Baroness Boothroyd, Baroness Knight of Collingtree and Baroness Dean of Thornton-le-Fylde.
- Laying Down the Law – A standalone programme that explained the parliamentary stages a bill must go through to become an Act of Parliament.
- MP Too! – A series of short programmes that looked back at some eighteenth and nineteenth century Members of Parliament (MPs) who were more famous for their work outside of the House of Commons or House of Lords.
- Speaker's Lectures – A series of lectures initiated by John Bercow, the Speaker of the House of Commons, from 2011 to 2019. To mark the centenary of the Parliament Act 1911, the lectures covered some of the main political figures of the century.
- Village Idioms – Short examinations of modern-day idioms that were coined in Westminster, including 'reading the Riot Act' and 'flogging a dead horse'.

=== Archive and special programming ===
==== General election and referendum repeats ====
Between 2002 and 2020, the channel frequently showed recordings of BBC general election coverage, from the 1955 election, the first British election programme to be telerecorded as well as other events such as the 1975 EEC Referendum and the 2016 EU Referendum. Some have been broadcast on the anniversary of their original transmissions. The channel's editor has described this as adding "something of value" and says it helps the channel "reach a wider audience for our normal parliamentary schedule". These reruns ceased in 2020 as part of the cutbacks to the channel which saw the ending of the broadcasting of archive programming on BBC Parliament.

Election	Coverage title	Dates shown
1955^{1}	1955 General Election	26 May 2005 – 50th anniversary 26 May 2015 – 60th anniversary 30 August 2015
1959^{2}	1959 General Election	9 October 2009 – 50th anniversary 9 October 2019 – 60th anniversary 9 May 2020
1964	1964 General Election	4 January 2004; 3 October 2008; 12 November 2014; 16 May 2020
1966	1966 General Election	31 March 2006 – One hour 'highlights' programme, 40th anniversary 8 April 2006 – Full Coverage; 28 March 2016 – 50th anniversary
1970	BBC Election 70	26 September 2003; 18 July 2005 – Unadvertised; shown the day after the death of Ted Heath; 9 October 2010; 20 June 2020 – 50th anniversary
February 1974	BBC Election 74	3 October 2003; 19 February 2010; 15 May 2010; 1 September 2012 – Shown in tribute to the late Alastair Burnet; 21 February 2014 – 40th anniversary 30 October 2020
October 1974	BBC Election 74	10 October 2004 – 30th anniversary 10 October 2014 – 40th anniversary 31 October 2020
1975 United Kingdom European Communities membership referendum^{3}	The Referendum Result	5 June 2005 – 30th anniversary 6 June 2015 – 40th anniversary 5 June 2016 – 41st anniversary & run up to 2016 EU Referendum as part of 75 Not Out
1979^{4}	Decision 79	7 September 2002; 3 May 2004 – 25th anniversary 4 May 2009 – 30th anniversary 13 April 2013 – Shown to mark the death of Margaret Thatcher; 6 May 2019 – 40th anniversary 23 May 2020
1983^{5}	Election 83	6 October 2006; 30 May 2008 – 25th anniversary 1 April 2013 – 30th anniversary
1987^{6}	Election 87	5 September 2005; 5 October 2007; 9 June 2012 – 25th anniversary
1992	Election 92	9 April 2007 – 15th anniversary 9 April 2012 – 20th anniversary 8 April 2017 – 25th anniversary
1997^{8}	Election 97	8 September 2002; 13 May 2005; 7 May 2007 – tenth anniversary 4 September 2017 – 20th anniversary^{7} 30 May 2020
2001	Vote 2001 The Verdict	30 May 2011 – tenth anniversary
2005	Election Night	7 May 2005 – Two days after its original transmission
2010	Election 2010	8 May 2010 – Two days after its original transmission 8 May 2020 – tenth anniversary
2015	Election 2015	9 May 2015 – Two days after its original transmission
2016 United Kingdom European Union membership referendum on Brexit	EU Referendum – The Result	25 June 2016 – Two days after its original transmission 23 June 2018 – second anniversary
2017	Election 2017	10 June 2017 – Two days after its original transmission
2019	Election 2019	14 December 2019 – Two days after its original transmission

^{1} – Only three hours of the programme is known to exist.
^{2} – This was given a special introduction by David Dimbleby, the son of Richard Dimbleby who presented the 1959 broadcast. Only the overnight footage was shown because the daytime coverage was not kept.
^{3} – Only two hours of coverage is known to exist with the surviving coverage originally broadcast in mid-afternoon.
^{4} – In addition, the overnight coverage of the 1979 election was broadcast on BBC Four on 12 June 2008.
^{5} – The 1983 coverage was originally scheduled to be shown on 10 October 2003, but was not broadcast.
^{6} _ The 1987 coverage was originally scheduled to be shown on 10 June 2017 for the 30th anniversary which was the following day 11 June but due to the 2017 General Election having taken place 2 days earlier the planned showing was cancelled and replaced by the re-run of Election 2017
^{7} – The 1997 coverage was originally scheduled to be shown on 1 May 2017 to coincide with its 20th anniversary but due to the surprise calling of the 2017 general election scheduled for 8 June it was postponed, and eventually shown on 4 September 2017.
^{8} – The 1997 coverage was broadcast "clean"- without the original on-screen graphics, although they have been included on all other election reruns.

==== Special programming ====
From 2002 until 2019 BBC Parliament frequently broadcast programmes that have a historical or broader social significance, often encompassing major events both in the United Kingdom and in the world. They have also included a selection of programmes exploring issues of import and topicality in-depth, akin to BBC Four. They are generally shown on the anniversaries of major events. Programmes in this area have been diverse in character, such as the channel's first archive rerun, which was to celebrate the Golden Jubilee in June 2002 when BBC Parliament reran the coronation coverage. All special programming ended in 2020 due to cutbacks at the channel which saw it revert to schedule which only featured live and delayed coverage of the UK's Parliamentary bodies.

===== 2005–2006 =====
In 2005, the channel marked the 40th anniversary of the death of Winston Churchill by broadcasting archive coverage of his funeral.

Also in 2005, BBC Parliament also marked the 30th anniversary of the first referendum over Europe by reshowing interviews with the two main party leaders, and broadcasting the two hours of the Referendum results coverage which the BBC retains in its archives.

The 50th anniversary of the Suez Crisis was commemorated in November 2006, with writer and broadcaster Anthony Howard introducing a special series of programmes on the channel. This included television broadcasts by the then-prime minister Anthony Eden and the then-Labour Leader of the Opposition Hugh Gaitskell, alongside a new documentary called Suez in Parliament: a Fine Hullabaloo.

===== 2007–2008 =====
On 1 April 2007, veteran BBC correspondent Brian Hanrahan introduced Falklands Night to mark the 25th anniversary of the outbreak of the Falklands War. Programming included the BBC's original television news bulletins and reports from the period, alongside editions of Newsnight and excerpts of debates from Question Time. Falklands Night was shown twice during the spring of 2007 to mark the beginning and the end of the conflict.

On 1 July 2007, the channel broadcast Hong Kong Night, presented by Chris Patten, the last Governor of Hong Kong, which reran coverage of the handover ceremony, to coincide with the tenth anniversary of the end of British rule, and the transfer of sovereignty over Hong Kong to China.

The tenth anniversary of the death of Diana, Princess of Wales was marked on 1 September 2007 with a broadcast of the BBC coverage of her funeral. The rerun was shown at the precise broadcast times of the BBC's original coverage, running from 8:25 am until 4:00 pm. David Dimbleby, who anchored the BBC's coverage, said a few words at the beginning and end of the rerun.

Cliff Michelmore came out of retirement on 18 November 2007 to present The Pound in Your Pocket, a special strand of programming to mark forty years since the devaluation of the Pound by the British government on 18 November 1967. Editions of The Money Programme and 24 Hours were shown along with highlights from the 1968 Budget programme and ministerial broadcasts. The strand's title was taken from the famously misquoted television broadcast made by the then-prime minister Harold Wilson about the devaluation on 19 November 1967. Wilson said: "It does not mean that the pound here in Britain, in your pocket, in your purse or bank has been devalued."

On 26 May 2008, Joan Bakewell introduced an archive evening called Permissive Night which examined the liberalising social reform legislation passed by Parliament in the late 1960s. Topics covered included changes to divorce law, the death penalty, the Abortion Act 1967, the Race Relations Act 1968, the partial decriminalisation of homosexual acts (using editions of the documentary series Man Alive) and the relaxation of censorship. The evening concluded with a special new edition of Late Night Line-Up, the review programme that Joan Bakewell presented in the late 1960s.

On 30 November 2008, BBC Parliament broadcast the 1958 State Opening of Parliament to mark 50 years since the event was first televised.

===== 2009 =====
The fall of James Callaghan's Labour government was marked on its 30th anniversary – 28 March 2009. Donald MacCormick, making what would prove to be his final television appearance before his death, presented The Night The Government Fell, which included nearly three-and-a-half hours of audio highlights of the Commons debate that resulted in Callaghan's government losing a vote of no confidence by 311 votes to 310. A documentary charting the evening's events was shown, as was McCormick's own live programme from Westminster on the night of the vote.

On 28 June 2009, BBC Parliament reran BBC TV's coverage of the 1969 Investiture of Prince Charles as Prince of Wales to mark the 40th anniversary of this event. The channel also re-broadcast an interview which Prince Charles gave a few days before his Investiture.

The anniversary of the BBC's own Question Time series was marked on 25 September 2009 by re-broadcasting the first edition of the topical discussion programme from 30 years earlier. Robin Day presented alongside the inaugural panel of Michael Foot MP, Teddy Taylor, Edna O'Brien and Archbishop Derek Worlock.

The writer and broadcaster Anthony Howard presented an archive evening on 10 October 2009 entitled Never Had It So Good, that looked back on 1959. This included television election broadcasts by the prime minister Harold Macmillan, Leader of the Opposition Hugh Gaitskell and Labour's Tony Benn; an edition of Tonight; and other BBC current affairs programmes. The evening's title is taken from a phrase contained in a speech made by Harold Macmillan in 1957 when he optimistically said, "Let us be frank about it – most of our people have never had it so good".

===== 2011 =====
At the 2011 Irish general election, BBC Parliament simulcast Irish state broadcaster RTÉ's general election results programme on 26 February 2011. The election saw the incumbent Irish government fall to heavy defeat at the hands of the other parties. The channel also broadcast recorded coverage of the presentation of the Irish government's 2012 budget in the Dáil Éireann in December 2011.

===== 2013 =====
On Thursday 14 February, BBC Parliament broadcast an evening of selected archive programmes under the title Harold Wilson Night. Presented by Peter Snow, the five-hour block of programming marked the 50th anniversary of the election of Harold Wilson as leader of the Labour Party on 14 February 1963, the longest serving and most electorally successful Labour prime minister of the 20th century. The sequence of programmes, which included Harold Wilson's famous "Pound in your Pocket" broadcast and the first airing of the once controversial Yesterday's Men documentary since its initial broadcast in June 1971, was repeated two days later.

On Monday 18 March, BBC Parliament showed four hours of the House of Commons debate about whether to commit British troops to the invasion of Iraq. Titled Iraq – Ten Years On, it was shown to mark the tenth anniversary of the debate.

On Monday 8 April, BBC Parliament broadcast an evening of archive programming to mark the death of Margaret Thatcher, the first female to serve as prime minister. The schedule included three interviews conducted by Sir Robin Day, Mrs Thatcher's speeches to the 1980 and 1984 Conservative Party Conferences, her last speech in the House of Commons in November 1990 and her maiden speech in the House of Lords in 1992.

On the 60th anniversary of the Coronation of Queen Elizabeth II (2 June), the channel showed BBC Television's original coverage of the event. The footage was shown "as live" and included the State Procession which followed the Coronation service.

On Sunday 9 June, BBC Parliament broadcast Beeching Night to mark the 50th anniversary of The Beeching Report on the future of Britain's railways, which recommended closing 3,000 miles of track and 2,000 stations to help stem massive losses. The evening was presented by Nicholas Owen. The strand featured railway-themed editions of various BBC current affairs programmes, including two editions of Panorama, as well as news reports and two interviews with Dr Beeching. Also included was a new programme looking at the relationship between the railways and politicians.

On Saturday 19 October, BBC Parliament marked the 50th anniversary of the appointment of Alec Douglas-Home as prime minister following the resignation of Harold Macmillan. Titled Home at the Top the sequence included the edition of Panorama broadcast on the night of the hand-over and an address to the nation by the new prime minister.

===== 2014 =====
Following the death of Tony Benn on 14 March 2014, BBC Parliament broadcast a special evening of programming which included his 1959 Labour Party election broadcast from the general election campaign; Mr Benn's 1990 House of Commons speech from the vote of confidence debate on Prime Minister Margaret Thatcher; his final speech in Parliament in 2001; his 1995 documentary Behind Closed Doors which took viewers behind the scenes in Parliament; and Labour MP Tristan Hunt's 2011 Speaker's lecture on the career of Tony Benn.

===== 2015 =====
To mark the 50th anniversary of the funeral of Winston Churchill, BBC Parliament replayed the black-and-white funeral coverage, commentated by Richard Dimbleby, and at the same time as the original broadcast. The broadcast was introduced by Nicholas Soames, Churchill's grandson, who was in attendance that day.

On Sunday 26 July, BBC Parliament showed an evening of programmes to mark the 50th anniversary of Ted Heath becoming the leader of the Conservative Party.

On Saturday 28 November, BBC Parliament broadcast Tebbit on Thatcher, an evening of programmes to mark the 25th anniversary of Margaret Thatcher's resignation as prime minister and leader the Conservative Party. The programmes were introduced by Norman Tebbit and the items shown included her 1980 speech to the Conservative Party Conference, news reports about vital events in her time as prime minister and two editions of Panorama.

===== 2016 =====
On 3 April, BBC Parliament broadcast Callaghan Night to mark the 40th anniversary of James Callaghan replacing Harold Wilson as prime minister and leader of the Labour Party. Three editions of Panorama and two editions of Tonight were shown, which covered significant moments of Mr Callaghan's time as prime minister, including the UK's financial bailout by the IMF, the 1977 Lib-Lab pact and the result of the 1979 vote of no confidence against the government of James Callaghan which signalled the end of the Labour Government.

On 5 June to mark both the 41st anniversary of the 1975 EEC Referendum in the run-up to the 2016 EU Referendum the channel broadcast a night of current and archive programmes under the banner of "75: Not Out." The opening programme (of the same name) was presented by Angela Rippon and featured the "1975 Oxford Union Debate" in two parts, a 1975 Panorama EEC debate which was presented by a young David Dimbleby, BBC news clips, the original 1975 EEC Referendum party political broadcasts and the surviving results programme.

===== 2017 =====
On 12 May, to mark the 80th anniversary of the coronation of King George VI, BBC Parliament showed Pathe's original coverage of the coronation and Pathe's colour film of the coronation processions to and from Westminster Abbey. In addition, the channel showed a brief programme looking at BBC Television's coverage of the day.

===== 2019 =====
On 3 June 2019, BBC Parliament showed the BBC's coverage of the results of the 2016 United States presidential election which saw Donald Trump elected as President of the United States. The coverage was timed to coincide with his state visit to Britain. This is the first time that BBC Parliament has shown a rerun of the BBC's coverage of an American election.

On 1 July 2019, BBC Parliament reran BBC TV's coverage of the 1969 Investiture of Prince Charles as Prince of Wales to mark the 50th anniversary of the event.

=== Former programming ===
Until 2021, BBC Parliament had broadcast a range of political and current affairs programmes from across the BBC, including:

- BOOKtalk – face-to-face discussion with authors about recently released political books, presented by Mark D'Arcy. A summer special was also produced featuring several 'beach books'.
- Briefings – a strand of programmes, usually broadcast weekend evenings, containing recorded coverage of major press briefings and conferences given by politicians in the previous week.
- Dateline London – a roundtable panel of foreign correspondents in London discussing the week's news. Dateline was then only shown on the BBC News Channel and on BBC World News before being cancelled altogether in 2022.
- Dragon's Eye (produced by BBC Wales) – presented by Adrian Masters or Rhun ap Iorwerth, provided a weekly roundup of Welsh political developments (since replaced by the Welsh section of Sunday Politics).
- Eòrpa (produced by BBC Gàidhlig) – current affairs series which covered political and social developments covering Europe, transmitted in Gaelic with English subtitles.
- Hearts and Minds (produced by BBC Northern Ireland) – weekly programme which covered the latest issues in the politics of Northern Ireland (since replaced by the Northern Irish section of Sunday Politics).
- Lords Questions – recorded coverage of the most recent session of Questions in the House of Lords.
- Mayor's Question Time – recorded coverage of the monthly question period in the London Assembly to the Mayor of London.
- Politics Europe – monthly programme usually broadcast on a Friday which covered the latest political news across Europe, analysing both the situation in Brussels as well as within individual European nations. Filmed in the same format as the Daily Politics, presented by Andrew Neil or Jo Coburn. Also broadcast on BBC World News.
- Politics Live – a daily political programme broadcast live weekdays on BBC Two at 12:15 pm during parliamentary sessions and presented by Andrew Neil and Jo Coburn. Politics Live discussed the latest political guests and talk about the day events across the United Kingdom, and was repeated on BBC Parliament every night at midnight. The Sunday Politics from BBC One (including the London region opt-out section) was also repeated at midnight on the day of broadcast.
- Prime Minister's Questions – recorded coverage of the most recent session of Prime Minister's Questions in the House of Commons. Live coverage was also provided on the channel without comment or interruption as part of the channel's live coverage of the House of Commons' sittings.
- Question Time (repeated from BBC One) – a topical debate programme based on Any Questions? which typically features politicians from at least the three major political parties as well as other public figures who answer questions put to them by the audience. Repeated on BBC Parliament every Sunday at 6 pm.
- Scottish First Minister's Questions – recorded coverage of the most recent session of Questions to the First Minister of Scotland in the Scottish Parliament. Scottish First Minister's Questions is broadcast on Thursday evenings at 11:30 pm, and is repeated throughout the week.
- Straight Talk – a weekly political talk show in which presenter Andrew Neil discussed the motivations, ideas and politics of leading figures in UK public life using the 1960s classic Face to Face format. Straight Talk is no longer produced.
- Sunday Politics Scotland (produced by BBC Scotland) – the Scottish section of The Sunday Politics, presented by Gordon Brewer and transmitted on BBC One Scotland.
- Ten Minute Rule Bill – Recorded coverage of a backbench MP seeking the leave of the House of Commons to introduce a piece of legislation on a specific topic under the rules of Standing Order 23.
- The Day in Parliament – nightly programme, broadcast at 11 pm, or following the adjournment of the House of Commons if it sits after that time, that rounds up the day's headlines from across all of the UK's legislative chambers. The Record is usually presented by Keith McDougall, Alicia McCarthy, David Cornock, Mandy Baker or Kristina Cooper.
- The Record Europe – a weekly review of the work of the European Parliament, and the other European Union institutions, with debate and analysis of current European political issues. Presented by Shirin Wheeler. Ended mid-2012 and replaced by Politics Europe, presented by Andrew Neil.
- The Week in Parliament – a weekly 30-minute-long analysis and discussion of major events in the UK's legislative chambers. Special editions of the record were produced during Westminster recesses reviewing the preceding session, and at the end of the calendar year reviewing the previous 12 months. The weekly edition was presented by either Keith McDougall, David Cornock, Mandy Baker, Kristina Cooper and Alicia McCarthy, and the special editions are often presented jointly by McDougall and McCarthy.
- The World Debate – part of a selection of programmes originally transmitted on BBC World News, that were broadcast exclusively on BBC Parliament to UK audiences, such as the 2009 London Intelligence Squared debates.
- This Week – repeated from BBC One and presented by Andrew Neil. An often-witty look at developments on the UK and international political scene, with a variety of guest contributions and discussions. The programme ended in July 2019.
- Washington Journal (from C-SPAN) – providing a lookback at the week in American politics, and providing the opportunity for UK viewers to contribute to a phone-in debate.
- Welsh First Minister's Questions – recorded coverage of the most recent session of Questions to the First Minister of Wales in the Senedd Cymru – Welsh Parliament. Welsh First Minister's Questions was always broadcast on Tuesday evenings at 11:30 pm, and is then repeated throughout the week.

Until 2019, BBC Parliament also broadcast the annual party conferences of the UK's major political parties in full and highlights of the smaller party conferences. In the past, the channel also aired highlights of the General Synod of the Church of England, live coverage of the annual chamber sitting of the UK Youth Parliament in the House of Commons, oral evidence sessions from the British Youth Council's Youth Select Committee, and the annual House of Lords Chamber Event.

== See also ==
- Legislative broadcaster
