= Lingfield College =

Location
- Lingfield, Surrey, RH7 6PH; United Kingdom; 51°10′18″N 0°00′04″E

Information
- Type: Private Day School
- Religious affiliation: Non-Denominational Christian
- Established: 1940
- Local authority: Surrey County Council
- Department for Education URN: 125387 Tables
- Gender: Co-educational
- Age: 2 to 18
- Enrolment: Approx. 700
- Colours: Cherry and grey
- Publication: Lingfield Review
- Website: www.lingfieldcollege.co.uk

Lingfield College is a private day school situated in Lingfield in the English county of Surrey, for pupils aged six months to eighteen years old. It was originally a boarding school for girls and became fully co-educational in 1996. As of 2022 there are approximately 940 pupils at the School spread over two sites situated next to one another: the Prep School and the Senior School. The School is a member of the Headmasters' and Headmistresses Conference.

== History ==
Lingfield College was founded in 1940 by three members of the Roman Catholic School Sisters of Notre Dame as an all-girls school. They had arrived from Faversham, Kent with fourteen young evacuees and set up a school. The School originally occupied houses in Lingfield, before the purchase of Batnors Hall (the current site of the Prep School) and Ivy House (the current site of the Senior School), both on the edge of the village, and close by to Lingfield Racecourse. Ivy House was renamed Le Clerc House, after Alix Le Clerc, the founder of the sixteenth-century order from which the Sisters' congregation was descended.

The School was expanded over both sites in the 1950s and 1960s; however by the early 1980s, a decline in vocations made the Sisters feel the need to focus their now more limited resources elsewhere in the world. They left Lingfield in 1986. The School's governance was turned over to a lay educational trust, after which boarding was discontinued and lay senior staff and a board of governors were appointed to replace the Sisters. In 1996 the school became fully co-educational, after the appointment of Nuala Shepley as headmistress in 1992.

In 2011, Nuala Shepley retired and Richard Bool was appointed as the new Headmaster.

== GCSE, iGCSE and A Level ==
At GCSE or iGCSE most students normally take seven compulsory subjects and choose three further options.

Students typically study three subjects at A Level but have the option to choose four. This may be a combination of A Levels and BTECs.

== Notable former pupils ==
=== Notre Dame School ===
- Ellie Price, television political journalist
