= Bethan James =

British journalist

Bethan James is a BBC political reporter from Wales based in Westminster.

Following some intrepid trips to Colombia, Bethan joined BBC Wales' political team in 2002. She primarily works on BBC Wales opt outs of the Politics Show and BBC Wales' AMPM programme as well as BBC News and BBC's Welsh Language service on S4C, Newyddion. She films and edits most of her TV material herself.

Whilst parliament is in session she has a weekly video-blog available at BBC News Online called Parlyvision.
