= Ellie Price =

British television political journalist

Ellie Jane Price (born 23 March 1983) is a British television political journalist.

== Early life ==
Price was born in Haywards Heath, West Sussex. She has a younger sister (born 1986). She grew up in East Grinstead, where she took part in athletics events as a sprinter. She attended the independent Notre Dame School, now called Lingfield College, gaining all A and A* in her GCSEs in 1999.

She studied for a BSc in Politics at the University of Bristol from 2001 to 2004, and for a PgDip in Broadcast Journalism at Cardiff University from 2005 to 2006.

== Career ==
From 2007 to 2010 she worked for the Press Association (PA).

She worked for ITV from October 2010 to December 2012, for ITV News Anglia in Norwich.

She joined the BBC as a political reporter in February 2012, and reported on the 2015 general election. She worked at BBC South East.

In 2021 Price was recommended by the government interview panel to take the role of Prime Minister's spokesperson; this decision was overturned and the role instead offered to Allegra Stratton.
