= Peter Henley =

Peter Henley is BBC South's political editor and has been reporting in the south of England for over 20 years. He currently presents the south's regional segment of the BBC's Sunday Politics programme.

== Career ==
Beginning his media career at BBC Radio Leicester while still at university, Peter went on to Pennine Radio, where he was a reporter and newsreader for the Bradford station. He moved to Radio 210 in Reading, where he won a Sony award for coverage of the Clapham rail crash.

Switching from radio to television, Peter became a reporter for southern ITV franchisee Television South, filing special reports from Saudi Arabia during the Gulf War, and covering the weeks in which Michael Heseltine fought to replace Margaret Thatcher. When TVS lost its ITV franchise, Peter transferred to the new contractor, Meridian Broadcasting as a reporter and played a part in launching Meridian's Thames Valley news service. It was while here that he became one of Meridian's political correspondents, fronting Meridian's political coverage of the 1997 general election, a role he later repeated in the 2001 election.

In the autumn of 2001, Peter transferred to the BBC to become BBC South's health correspondent. He soon after took his current role as political editor. His role includes presenting the regional section of Sunday Politics, broadcast weekly, and reporting on political stories on the regional television news programme South Today and on the region's local radio stations Radio Berkshire, Radio Oxford and Radio Solent. He also occasionally appears on the BBC News Channel reporting on political issues in the south, and has reported from the Portsmouth and Romsey counts at the 2005 and 2010 general elections for the national BBC election programmes.

Part of Peter's popularity is sourced from the way in which he connects with the viewer. His belief that people should care about what happens in Westminster and how is affects local people, often results in their opinions being heard and voiced. His programme is often broadcast from a public location and audiences are occasionally used. Peter's use of technology has always extended this bond with the viewer. Text messages and responses left on social media sites are often posed to the panel on his programme, and he keeps the public informed through his BBC News correspondents blog, and his Henley's Hustings blog before it. Facebook and Twitter are also used, with his following '@BBCPeter H'.

This dedication recently saw him receive the (RTA) Royal Television Award for journalist of the year 2009 in the South of England.

== Personal life ==
Peter was born in 1964, and studied at the University of Leicester, where he read philosophy. Peter is married to Samantha Reed, a counsellor, with three sons, Ben, Harry and Toby, and lives in the New Forest in Hampshire.

Peter enjoys a range of hobbies, including playing golf and cricket - as well as pursuing his love for technology and classic cars.

== See also ==
- South Today
- BBC South
