= Tim Iredale =

English journalist

Timothy Iredale (born 24 October 1972 in Huddersfield, West Riding of Yorkshire) is an English television journalist, currently the Political Editor for BBC Yorkshire and Lincolnshire.

== Career ==
Tim Iredale is the BBC Political Editor for Yorkshire and Lincolnshire (broadcast from Belmont). He covers the region which was home to some of the most familiar political heavyweights, including John Prescott (Baron Prescott), Alan Johnson and David Davis.

He worked in Exeter for a local newspaper.

=== ITV ===
Prior to moving to the BBC in 2006, Tim was the Chief Political Correspondent for ITV Yorkshire from 2001 (broadcast from Emley Moor and Belmont).

=== BBC ===
In September 2009 he became the main presenter for the region's Politics Show, broadcast Sundays on BBC1. This had been presented by Clare Frisby, and previous to her, Cathy Killick. He has also acted as a political reporter (known as a network correspondent) for Radio 4's news programmes. The Politics Show became Sunday Politics.

He is also a regular presenter of the Look North programme.

== See also ==
- Len Tingle, Political Editor for BBC Yorkshire (west, north and south, broadcast from Emley Moor)

Media offices
Preceded by Clare Frisby	Presenter of Sunday Politics Yorkshire; September 2009 –	Succeeded by Incumbent
Preceded by	Political Editor of BBC Yorkshire and Lincolnshire; 2006 –	Succeeded by Incumbent
Preceded by	Chief Political Correspondent of ITV Yorkshire; 2001–2006	Succeeded by
