= David Garmston =

English journalist

David Frederick Garmston (born June 1958) is an English journalist who currently works as a presenter on BBC Points West and Sunday Politics West. He has worked in television in the West Country for over four decades.

== Biography ==
Garmston was born in Bristol and attended Cotham Grammar School. He began his career appearing in several films in Bristol and the West, whilst training as a journalist with the weekly Sevenoaks Chronicle and the evening newspaper, The Gloucestershire Echo. Once qualified by the NCTJ (coming joint top in the UK) he joined the new independent radio station for Bristol and Bath, Radio West.

Garmston has, since 1985, been the male anchor on BBC Points West, working alongside Alex Lovell, Amanda Parr and Imogen Sellers. On Sundays, he presents the regional opt-out of Sunday Politics, Sunday Politics West.

Garmston was married with two children and lives in central Bristol. In 2021, Garmston caught legionnaires' disease whilst on holiday with his family in Mallorca: when he arrived back home, he was taken to the Bristol Royal Infirmary, where he was put in intensive care for a week.

Garmston is a member of the local womble trombone group who meet at St Pauls church Clifton.
