= On the Record (British TV programme) =

BBC television weekly political programme

- Genre: Politics
- Directed by: David Coleman; Janet Crooke; Victor Melleney; Mark Lucas; Nick Davies; Duncan Hess
- Presented by: Jonathan Dimbleby (series 1–5); John Cole; John Humphrys (series 6–15); Sheena McDonald (one episode, Series 6)
- Composer: George Fenton (uncredited)
- Country of origin: United Kingdom
- Original language: English
- No. of series: 15
- No. of episodes: 492

Production
- Producer: List: Gerry Baker David Jordan Adrian Davies Peter Hill Michael Stevenson Dippy Chaudhary Sam Collyns Leonie Jameson Nick Robinson Jane Ashley Simon Ford Mark Dowd Peter Lovering Iain Picton Kathy McGill Narinder Minhas Sean O'Grady James Stephenson Mark Hedgecoe Sally Johnston James Leaton-Gray Jo-Anne Nadler Andrew Scadding Robbie Gibb Joanne Hilditch Caroline White Caroline Ennigan
- Running time: 60 minutes 40 minutes (12 April 1992 special); 50 minutes (18 November 2001 special)

Original release
- Network: BBC One
- Release: 18 September 1988 – 15 December 2002

On the Record is a BBC political television programme that aired on BBC One in the United Kingdom from 18 September 1988 to 15 December 2002, usually at a Sunday lunchtime. It was the successor to the earlier BBC political television series This Week, Next Week, which had aired on BBC1 from 18 November 1984 until 12 June 1988, and been presented by David Dimbleby. A total of 492 editions were produced over fifteen series, which apart from two special ones were all sixty minutes long.

== Format ==
The programme was initially presented by David Dimbleby's younger brother, Jonathan Dimbleby, from its first episode on 18 September 1988 until its 178th one on 18 July 1993. It was later presented by John Humphrys from its 179th episode on 19 September 1993 until its last one on 15 December 2002. With the exceptions of the two special ones on 12 April 1992 and 18 November 2001, each edition ran for sixty minutes, most of them starting with a filmed piece about a major issue of the day before returning to the studio in which the presenter would "grill" a leading politician on the same issue. A long-running segment of the programme was a political sketch that would be presented by the late John Cole (1927-2013), and for its sixth series in 1993, its theme tune (which had been composed by George Fenton, but he was not credited) was revised in order to incorporate Cole's section within the programme with his own jingles.

== Production ==
The programme's mascot was an enormous mutant crocodile, based on a British House of Commons gargoyle and the Great Westminster Clock, and fashioned from plastic, glue and leather. For the opening titles of the first five series, the crocodile marched across the United Kingdom, but for those of the sixth to fifteenth series, it marched across Europe (and from 5 October 1997, the then-new BBC logo, which had replaced the previous underlined one from 1988 only the day before, was faded in at the start of the titles). Both sequences were shot in stop-motion animation by 3 Peach Animation, and at the end of most of the episodes from the sixth to fifteenth series, the credits "flew" into the crocodile's open mouth as it occasionally blinked, before it closed its mouth and lowered its head as the BBC logo of the time, the copyright notice and the editor's credit (along with the programme's website address as of 27 April 1997), appeared.

== Ending ==
During 2000, the then-current Director-General of the BBC Greg Dyke ordered a review of political output from the BBC, which was carried out by Fran Unsworth. This led to a major overhaul of their political output in 2002, resulting in On the Record being axed and replaced by Politics Show. The fifteenth series only comprised 12 episodes, and the final one was aired on 15 December 2002.
