= Mark Easton =

BBC Home Editor

- Born: Mark Richard Erskine Easton; 12 March 1959 (age 67); Bearsden, Glasgow, Scotland
- Education: Peter Symonds Grammar School
- Occupations: Journalist, presenter
- Notable credit: BBC News
- Spouse: Antonia Higgs
- Children: 4

Mark Richard Erskine Easton (born 12 March 1959) is a writer and broadcaster. He is a Senior Fellow at the National Centre for Social Research, a Fellow of the Academy of Social Sciences and a Governor of the National Institute of Economic and Social Research. He was Home Editor for BBC News broadcasting on national television and radio news from 2004 to 2025. His writing and presenting credits include Policing Protest for BBC Radio 4 in 2024, What Are the Police For?, for BBC Radio 4,The Happiness Formula on BBC Two in 2006 and The Crime of Our Lives for BBC Radio 4 in 2007. His first book, Britain etc., was published in 2012. His second book Islands: Searching for truth on the shoreline was published in October 2022.

He was previously social affairs editor at Channel 4 News and political editor at 5 News. Easton is a member of the Westminster Abbey Institute Council of Reference.

== Career ==
Easton joined his local newspaper, the Southern Evening Echo, in 1978 having decided upon a career in journalism after winning a game of Waddington's "Scoop" aged 13. He worked at Radio Victory from 1980 to 1981, at Radio Aire from 1981 to 1982 and at LBC from 1982 to 1986.

In 1986, Easton joined the BBC as a reporter on London Plus, BBC Breakfast News, Newsnight and Here and Now. In 1996, Easton joined the newly launched Channel Five as Political Editor for Five News. Easton then moved in 1998 to Channel 4 News as Home and Social Affairs Editor.

Easton was appointed Home Editor of BBC News in 2004, reporting across the corporation's range of platforms. As an editor, Easton appeared on the evening television bulletins BBC News at Six and BBC News at Ten, as well as BBC Radio 4 programmes including Today and the Radio 4 Six O'Clock News.

== Personal life ==
Easton lives in Islington with his wife and their four children.

Media offices
Preceded by None	Home Editor: BBC News; 2004–present	Succeeded by Incumbent
