= Jo Coburn =

British journalist

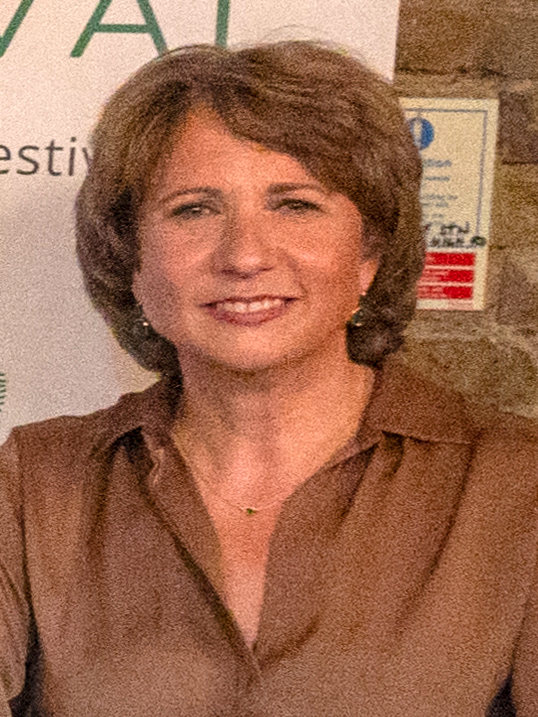
- Coburn at the 2024 Chiswick Book Festival
- Born: Joanne Dawn Coburn; London, England, UK
- Education: University of Manchester (BSc); University of Oxford (PgDip)
- Occupations: Journalist, presenter, political correspondent
- Spouse: Mark Flanagan (m. 1998)
- Children: 2

Joanne Dawn Coburn (born 12 November 1967) is a British journalist who works for Times Radio. She has spent most of her career with BBC News, having been a regular presenter of Politics Live (and at one time also of Sunday Politics along with Andrew Neil). She was previously a political correspondent for BBC Breakfast and is also a former BBC political correspondent for London.

In the past Coburn has presented on BBC Radio 4 and also has guested on the weekend current affairs programme The World This Weekend as well as reviewing the Sunday newspapers on The Andrew Marr Show and occasionally being a relief presenter on the BBC News Channel.

== Early life and education ==
Coburn was born in Hendon and educated at the North London Collegiate School, an independent school for girls in northwest London, followed by the University of Manchester, where she studied History and German, and the University of Oxford, where she studied Middle Eastern politics.

== Career ==
Coburn worked for local radio stations in Berkshire, Buckinghamshire and Oxfordshire.

After working as a regional correspondent for BBC London for four years, Coburn joined BBC Breakfast in 2001 as a political correspondent.

She spent some time presenting on the BBC News Channel, and three months as presenter of BBC Radio 4's political events programme The World This Weekend. She also covered the 2007 French presidential election and the Treaty of Lisbon ratification process. In 2008, she was part of the press pack during British prime minister Gordon Brown's visits both to Afghanistan, and to Beijing for the closing days of the 2008 Summer Olympic Games.

Coburn joined BBC Two's weekday political programme Daily Politics in 2008, presenting the show alongside Andrew Neil on Thursdays. From January 2010, she took over Anita Anand's role, presenting four days a week while Anand was away on maternity leave. Anand returned to the show in September 2010, meaning that Coburn returned to presenting on the programme one day a week, this time on Fridays. On 5 May 2010, Coburn joined Neil to present the final Daily Politics election debate, The Trust in Politics Debate, before the 2010 general election. The debate featured contributions from Harriet Harman, Sir George Young, Lynne Featherstone and Adam Price. In July 2011, Anand left the programme to present a new show on BBC Radio 5 Live, resulting in Coburn becoming a full-time co-presenter from September with Andrew Neil.

Aside from presenting Daily Politics, Coburn was often employed by the BBC to host more general debates and interviews. During the 2015 general election campaign, she presented a live-audience Question Time-style debate with the UKIP leader, Nigel Farage, in Birmingham. On 9 January 2017, Coburn presented a live audience debate with a panel of guests in East Grinstead about the continued Southern Rail strikes; this was titled Southern Rail Crisis. In the 2017 general election campaign, she presented a similar live audience debate with the Green Party co-leader Jonathan Bartley and the UKIP leader Paul Nuttall from The Bottle Yard Studios, Bristol.

Coburn also presented a companion show, Politics Europe, and the regional opt-out, Sunday Politics London. Both Politics Europe and Daily Politics were axed in 2018, with the latter replaced by Politics Live, which Coburn presented, alongside the continuing Sunday Politics London. On 20 March 2025, she announced she would be stepping down as host and would be leaving the BBC after 28 years. Her last Politics Live programme was on 22 May 2025.

On 5 June 2025, Times Radio announced that Coburn would be joining it as a presenter. Her first programme was The Times at One on 16 June 2025.

Coburn appeared on Paul Merton's team on Have I Got News for You for the Series 71, Episode 9 episode broadcast on BBC One on 29 May 2026.

== Personal life ==
Coburn is Jewish and is an active member of Ealing Liberal Synagogue. She is married to former Downing Street head of strategic communications Mark Flanagan with whom she has two sons. They live in West London.
