= Open Door (TV programme) =

British community television programme

- Genre: Educational; Factual television; Community television
- Created by: David Attenborough
- Starring: Mike Phillips; Alan Fisher; Peter Seabrook; Glenda Spooner; Andrew Faulds; Patrick Cosgrave; John Gielgud; Penelope Keith; Leonard Sachs; Julie Christie; Julie Walters; Maggie Steed
- Country of origin: United Kingdom
- Original language: English
- No. of seasons: 18
- No. of episodes: 253

Original release
- Network: BBC
- Release: 2 April 1973 – 2 September 1983

Open Door is a programme produced by the BBC's Community Programme Unit. It was first broadcast on 2 April 1973 and ran for a decade until September 1983. The programme gave people brief control of transmission and was a platform for the public to talk about its own issues and give their own views without editorial input from the BBC.

== Production ==
=== Community Programme Unit (CPU) ===
The Community Programme Unit was initiated by David Attenborough, the BBC Director of Programmes from 1969 to 1973, in collaboration with television producer Rowan Ayers. The two were interested in promoting public television as a space for participatory democracy. Ayers was appointed to run the Community Programme Unit (CPU).

The CPU had a base, deliberately distanced from the BBC Television Centre, in a terraced house owned by the BBC on Hammersmith Grove. William Fowler and Matthew Harle write that this was to ensure the Unit was visible to the community and that it was a less intimidating space for people to enter without having to go through security checks, for instance.

The CPU broadcast programmes both live with a studio audience and with pre-recorded elements. Programmes were styled on the format of popular talks shows and news reports of the day, but with a focus on social activism because community groups would be given editorial control over content. In a research article discussing the creation and legacy of the CPU, Jo Henderson argues:

The CPU's importance is threefold. Firstly, it created the broadcaster-as-publisher model in the UK, subsequently adopted by Channel 4, and now by streaming sites such as YouTube and post-mediated social media platforms such as Twitter. Secondly, it created innovative content that extended the topics and subjects on British television. Finally, it used the new technology of video to develop and refine techniques that have now become familiar elements in the television grammar of reality television and in first-person documentary

— Jo Henderson, Let the people speak – The Community Programmes Unit 1972–2002, Critical Studies in Television: The International Journal of Television Studies (2022)

Open Door, the first programme for the CPU, was initially brought to the attention of Robin Scott, who had been controller of the Light Programme and then BBC2, after reading about the idea from Frank Gillard, former director of BBC Radio, who had written about an American "people's radio show" in Boston. Attenborough appointed Scott and Ayers to create a BBC television version. In a Board of Management Meeting on 7 December 1972, Attenborough presented Community Programmes, a five-page report that proposed an experimental series, overseen by the CPU, to start in April 1973 (this would become known as Open Door). Attenborough argued that the network could benefit from community programmes by bringing "unheard voices to a mainstream audience" and by also challenging traditional ways of creating content. Thereby "new editorial attitudes that do not derive from the assumptions of the university-educated elite who are commonly believed to dominate television production." However, Attenborough also addressed the possible concerns of broadcasting such programmes, and he outlined these as including: (1) the potential to disrupt BBC impartiality, (2) the risk of programmes leaning too heavily in one political or social direction, (3) content may be boring and bring in low viewership, (4) programmes may be deliberately controversial, and (5) the potential for the BBC to be liable in libel proceedings or contempt of court. To counter this, Attenborough argued that the CPU should investigate applications "and make formal recommendations supported with a summary of their research and reasons for commendation to a Selection Committee".

Mike Phillips, interviewed by David Hendy for the University of Sussex - BBC Centenary Collection recalls that, at the time, there was a problem within and outside the Corporation for self-representation. Phillips describes his colleagues as being "all nice people" but criticises the lack of black and working-class representation not just on screen but behind it as producers and broadcasters, saying "the sense of who was entitled to speak and who was not entitled to speak was stifling."

=== Broadcast ===
Originally titled Open House, Open Door was approved and commissioned in April 1973 by the Director-General of the BBC from 1969 to 1977, Charles Curran. By February 1973, more than fifty community groups had applied and as part of the application process they pitched their premises to the CPU staff team who voted on the ideas they liked the most. The CPU decided they had enough content for 6 initial programmes. Of the groups that were successful, they were assigned their own producer who assisted them with formatting, styling and editing their programme.

Open Door was to be the final transmission on Monday night on BBC Channel Two, a decision that was partly made because it was felt this late-slot would minimise the risk of offending a large audience. Each programme would aim to follow the same format where four contributors would present information about the episode's topic. Every fourth programme in the series was initially planned to be a response programme where both a studio and home audience could respond to the previous transmissions.

Viewership for the first series of Open Door was not large, however, it was recommissioned for a second series in the same late Monday night slot. One of the earliest episodes to receive larger audience figures was 'The U & I Club' with a combined audience of 396,000 (from the original transmission and repeat), and 12,000 audience members wrote to the organisation regarding the episode.

Open Door was last broadcast in September 1983, after a decade on the television. It was succeeded by Open Space, and furthermore Video Diaries and Video Nation when there was increased availability to quality domestic video equipment. Budget cuts led to the end of the CPU in 2002.

== Episodes ==
Series	Episodes	Originally aired
1	13	Monday 2 April 1973
2	12	Monday 24 September 1973
3	12	Sunday 27 January 1974
4	6	Monday 13 May 1974
5	12	Monday 23 September 1974
6	17	Monday 27 January 1975
7	20	Monday 8 September 1975
8	16	Saturday 31 January 1976
9	18	Monday 20 September 1976
10	14	Monday 31 January 1977
11	14	Monday 19 September 1977
12	13	Monday 30 January 1978
13	26	Monday 18 September 1978
14	20	Saturday 22 September 1979
15	6	Thursday 11 September 1980
16	8	Wednesday 25 February 1981
17	18	Saturday 30 January 1982
18	8	Thursday 2 September 1982

=== Series 1 (1973) ===
No. overall	No. in season	Title	Original release date
1	1	"Saint Mungo Community Trust"	2 April 1973
Features the Saint Mungo Community Trust, a charity trust concerned with homelessness. The episode explains how the Trust sets up houses that offer refuge to those who would have no alternative. Insight from Jim Horne, who runs the Trust, and shows how the Trust operates a nightly hot soup service at different locations in London.
2	2	"Liberation of Lifestyle and the Responsible Society"	9 April 1973
Features 'The Responsible Society', a non-religious organisation believing that society has a right and role in defending certain principles of social responsibility. The group presents their view by discussing arguments on medical and social issues.
3	3	"Black Teachers"	16 April 1973
Demonstrates the minority of black people represented within the education sector at the time, presented by Mike Phillips. The episode was made by a group of black teachers who discuss the poor level of achievement amongst black students.
4	4	"Teachers in Dentistry"	30 April 1973
Teachers in dentistry show that prevention is better than the cure. Trees for People also explain why trees are precious.
5	5	"Feedback"	7 May 1973
Episode in front a live audience, where space for feedback and discussion is provided regarding previous topics on Open Door.
6	6	"East End Channel One"	14 May 1973
This episode is presented by The Basement Project Film Group where they satirize news reports on social security and they examine the issues facing the East of London. Themes include the benefits system, lack of social housing in the area, immigration and changing culture of the area.
7	7	"How to Stop Ring Roads"	21 May 1973
8	8	"Transex Liberation Group"	4 June 1973
Featured trans women from the Transex Liberation Group. Four group members held a discussion about their experiences as trans women in the 1960s and 1970s, commenting on daily challenges, employment and their transitions.
9	9	"Where is poetry? What is poetry?"	11 June 1973
Birmingham Poets ask: Where is poetry? What is poetry?. The Association of British Investigators explains the true role of the much aligned 'private eye.'
10	10	"Spring is here and the time is right for planting the streets"	18 June 1973
Street Farmers: 'Soring is here and the time is right for planting in the street.' The Council for Academic Freedom and Democracy also dsicusss the growing threat to freedom in universities, technical colleges and schools.
11	11	"RAFT: Recidivists Anonymous Fellowship Trust"	25 June 1973
RAFT: Recidivists Anonymous Fellowship Trust (a group of prisoners and ex-convicts) discuss how they look at the world and how the world sees them.
12	12	"Bogside Community Association"	2 July 1973
The Bogside Community Association presents its own view of the community of 'Bogside' to address stereotypes that it is violent.
13	13	"Cleaners Action"	9 July 1973
Cleaners Action discuss the domestic and working problems of night cleaners and about their attempts to organise workers.

=== Series 2 (1973) ===
No. overall	No. in season	Title	Original release date
14	1	"Mars Sector 8 calling..."	24 September 1973
Featuring the Aetherius Society, a group founded by George King who claims to have been to Mars.
15	2	"Battered Wives"	1 October 1973
Featuring Chiswick Women's Aid. Discusses the term 'battered wives' and its use by the media. A group of women and children talk about their wown experiences at Chiswick Hostel.
16	3	"Legal Profession"	8 October 1973
Members of the legal profession take a critical look at the kind of service they provide for the public.
17	4	"Tower Hamlets Truants/The Bootstrap Union"	15 October 1973
Tower Hamlets Truants discuss what is wrong with school and why they don't go. The Bootstrap Union (a group of teachers) look for ways to change the role of school in deprived areas.
19	5	"The London Trade Unions and Old Age Pensioners Joint Committee"	22 October 1973
The Old Age Pensioners Joint Committee discuss the hardships and experiences of pensioners and how they can help to improve circumstances.
20	7	"Countryside Crisis"	5 November 1973
Members of the village Conservation Committee in Randwick illustrate how the countryside can remain unspoilt, and introduce ideas for a Byway Code.
21	8	"U & I Club: Urinary Infection in Your Home"	12 November 1973
The U + I Club provide information, for those with cystitis, when doctors cannot help.
22	9	"So You Want to Go on the Stage?"	19 November 1973
Presented by The Arts Association. A panel of leading teachers and professionals answer questions on stage training.
23	10	"Women as Priests?"	26 November 1973
Presented by The Christian Parity Group and discussing women in the role of priests.
24	11	"The Gipsy Council"	3 December 1973
At a campsite in Wandsworth, the Gipsy Council meets with fellow gipsies, friends, and non-sympathisers for discussion, ceremonies, songs and dancing.
25	12	"Down Your Ward"	10 December 1973
Hospital Broadcasting Association presents a hospital radio show.

=== Series 3 (1974) ===
No. overall	No. in season	Title	Original release date
26	1	"Starting to Happen"	27 January 1974
A film about the experience of LIBERATION FILMS working with a group of people in Belham to use portable TV cameras to make their own show.
27	2	"Parent-to-Parent Information on Adoption Services"	3 February 1974
Parent-to-Parent information on adoption services.
28	3	"King's College Post-graduate Discussion Group"	10 February 1974
King's College Post-graduate Discussion Group attempt to share their understanding of the English language and literature by the examination and reading of Wordsworth's Lines Written a Few Miles above Tintern Abbey.
29	4	"One in a Thousand"	17 February 1974
A group of parents of deaf children expose the shortcomings of the advice and help given to them by doctors, teachers and administrators.
30	5	"Muscle Mania?"	24 February 1974
Explores the muscle scene and challenges myths and perceptions about bodybuilding.
31	6	"The British Association of Retired Persons"	25 February 1974
The British Association of Retired Persons present a discussion on some problems of retirement. The Society for the Rescue of Destitute Animals was started in Manchester 11 years ago and cares for animals abandoned by their owners.
32	7	"The Homeopathic Research and Educational Trust"	4 March 1974
A different approach to the treatment of illness which does not rely on powerful drugs. Discussion about availability under the NHS and whether the full value of homoeopathic treatment is recognised.
33	8	"Can we ever make our society less divided?"	11 March 1974
The 73 Club discuss society and presents a solution by breaking down social barriers between boys from totally different backgrounds.
34	9	"It's Driving Us Barmy!!!"	18 March 1974
Avonmouth Residents Association discuss 'Zombyism' and aim to show that there is hope and inspiration out of this.
35	10	"Black Workers' Rights Group"	25 March 1974
The Black Workers' Rights Group discuss recent strikes by black workers against discrimination on the shop floor. They show why the Trade Union movement must address this issue.
36	11	"Jericho"	1 April 1974
Maggie Black and Lucy Willis discuss the history of Jericho, Oxford as well as its present.
37	12	"Black Feet in the Snow"	8 April 1974
Presents the first play of the series, written by author Jamal Ali.

=== Series 4 (1974) ===
No. overall	No. in season	Title	Original release date
38	1	"Nobody's Child"	13 May 1974
Musicians' Action Group Jazz.... Nobody's Child ask 'is jazz the forgotten branch of music ... the music that the industry and media ignore?' A group of leading jazz musicians who strongly believe this to be so present their case and illustrate it with their music - the jazz of 1974.
39	2	"The Auxuliary Fire Service (1938-1968)/The Good Death"	20 May 1974
Discusses the history of The Auxiliary Fire Service. Dignity in Dying (originally known as The Voluntary Euthanasia Society) also discuss the human right to choose to live or die.
40	3	"Picture Power/The British Go Association"	3 June 1974
Evening students from London's City Literary Institute (City Lit) investigate the impact of the visual image. The British Go Association discuss the board game of Go and how it has been played for thousands of years in the Far East, and in recent years many Westerners have discovered its fascination.
41	4	"Life for the World Trust"	10 June 1974
Life for the World Trust is a Christian organisation which believes that a spiritual answer needs to be offered to drug addicts and young people with drug problems. people associated with the Trust and the problem of drug addiction show just how addicts are being helped to complete freedom through a faith in God.
42	5	"The Barnsley and District Art Society"	17 June 1974
The Barnsley and District Art Society demonstrate their paintings and their place in the world of art.
43	6	"The Whetley Voice"	24 June 1974
The Whetley Voice, a community newspaper in Bradford, is discussed. The editor and the community show how it is produced and talk about the value of grassroots journalism.

=== Series 5 (1974) ===
No. overall	No. in season	Title	Original release date
44	1	"The George Arthur Road Action Group"	23 September 1974
The George Arthur Road Action Group from Saltley, Birmingham, who write about their programme: Tear the houses apart and you tear the people apart. They discuss how their homes were to be demolished, but the community fought back.
45	2	"The Nite Blues Steel Band/A Town Divided"	29 September 1974
The Nite Blues Steel Band, from Stoke Newington, present music ranging from traditional West Indian style to rock. Two former students from Harrow Faculty of Art and Photography also present a personal view of the Ulster troubles.
46	3	"Grapevine"	6 October 1974
Presented by Su Carroll, Watkinson Grapevine is about people who get together to make life better for themselves and those around them. Features the Norwich Way Out Club for agoraphobics, and a black parents group from Bristol who are involved in a local festival and in a Saturday morning school for their children.
47	4	"Science for People"	13 October 1974
Presented by the British Society for Social Responsibility in Science.
48	5	"Hove Ratepayers Association"	27 October 1974
Hove Ratepayers Association want to change the stereotyped perception of Hove.
49	6	"Karate Do/Anarchists"	27 October 1974
The Shotokan Karate Centre shows that karate is more than a means of self-defence. Not only is it a discipline for the mind and body but also an art form in its own right. An anarchist from the Northampton steel town of Corby also explains why he believes we need revolutionary social change in order to give people control of their own lives, workplaces and communities.
50	7	"Wapping Parents' Action group"	3 November 1974
Wapping Parents' Action group present what they want for the area including clean stairwells, playgrounds and decent bus services.
51	8	"Freedom Under Law"	10 November 1974
Freedom Under Law, a citizens' organisation that fights disruption, present their belief that in a democracy, if people want to change society, they must change the law, not break it.
52	9	"Scouting - The Myth and the Reality"	17 November 1974
A light-hearted survey of some of the popular misconceptions which surround the Scout movement and. in contrast, an examination of the constructive role that scouting plays in the community.
53	10	"Mrs Eleanor Cook/Mr George Pluckwell"	1 December 1974
Nursing Sister Eleanor Cook presents her own practical guide to nursing and caring for elderly and chronically sick relative at home. Mr George Pluckwell also makes a please for more working-class poetry.
54	11	"Design Action"	8 December 1974
Presented by Design and Industries Association ask for help in meeting the challenge of the energy crisis and design for survival.
55	12	"Gingerbread"	15 December 1974
Presented by Gingerbread, a self-help association for one-parent families.

=== Series 6 (1975) ===
No. overall	No. in season	Title	Original release date
56	1	"South Place Ethical Society"	27 January 1975
Explores the questions 'What happens when a church leaves labels and dogmas behind; when it retains the religious essentials of wonder, enquiry, caring, and belonging; when it defends the freedom of speech as an article of faith: when it transforms itself in the process?'. 'South Place', in London, is featured as an example.
57	2	"Amazing Equal Pay Show"	3 February 1975
Presented by The Wages for Housework Campaign who believe that women need to be paid and recognised for the work they do in the home, until this is achieved women will not see equal pay.
58	3	"One Every 20 Seconds"	10 February 1975
Presented by Bristol Victims Support Scheme to support victims of crime.
59	4	"Smells Like Burnt Pork"	17 February 1975
Douglas MacDonald discusses his plans for a research and development association to aid inventors.
60	5	"Women Ask Questions"	24 February 1975
Five housewives from the National Housewives Association who believe that Great Britain is fast becoming Lesser Britain, and that everybody has contributed to bringing this about in their own way, question trade unionist Alan Fisher of NUPE, and company director Quinton Hazell of the CBI.
61	6	"Stirabout Theatre Company"	3 March 1975
The Stirabout Theatre Company show why they think prison theatre is necessary.
62	7	"Association for Neighbourhood Councils"	17 March 1975
Bob Dixey, director of the Association for Neighbourhood Councils (National Association of Local Councils) (ANC) Campaign attempts to changes made to the re-organisation of local government.
63	8	"The Cromarty Firth"	24 March 1975
The story of the fight against the threat of an American-backed oil refinery in the Scottish Highlands. The battlefield - an area of great natural beauty and full employment.
64	9	"Meriden Motorcycle Co-operative"	21 April 1975
The Co-operative invite critics to question their motives and their chance of success in a hard, competitive world. They believe that the media have covered their story well in human terms. The struggle for their right to work and to establish the Co-operative is won. They ask 'now, how do they see the future? What are their plans?'
65	10	"Asians in Britain: Part 1"	28 April 1975
the Standing Conference of Asian Organisations in the UK sets out to help understanding between Asians and the host community. Presents a study of Asians with their varied cultures, religions and languages and a look at the generation gap developing as young Asians grow up in Britain.
66	11	"Asians in Britain: Part 2"	5 May 1975
Identifies the special needs of the Asian community in the field of education, employment, youth and women and proposes measures to meet these needs.
67	12	"The International Arts Centre (IAC)"	12 May 1975
In this programme the Centre explains its philosophy and shows how people who normally shun the arts can interact with the IAC.
68	13	"Tolmers Village Association"	19 May 1975
Tolmers Village, a community in central London, is struggling for survival. This programme shows how property speculators can ruin people's lives and how councils and planners seem powerless to help. The villagers, however (together with 160 squatters), are fighting back.
69	14	"The Whiterock Co-operative of West Belfast"	2 June 1975
The story of industrial self-help and community action - the collective response of a number of Gaelic speakers to the problem of the lack of work in areas like Ballymurphy.
70	15	"The All Children Together Movement"	9 June 1975
Presented by the All Children Together Movement whose aim is to have integrated schools within the educational system of Northern Ireland.
71	16	"Hill of Harmony"	16 June 1975
From a province over-reported in terms of violence, the story of another face of Ulster life - Protestants and Catholics working together for reconciliation since 1965 through the unique Corrymeela Community.
72	17	"Who's Killing the Mother of Arts?"	23 June 1975
The contemporary housing estate is the standard solution to our housing needs and imaginative designers suffer rejection by planning authorities. The episode explores why.

=== Series 7 (1975) ===
No. overall	No. in season	Title	Original release date
73	1	"Forum - Unheard Voices: Unemployed from Ellesmere Port"	8 September 1975
In a week of special Open Door programmes, groups of people - whose attitudes and ideas are not commonly given direct expression in the media - are invited to put forward their views on the state of the nation... or anything else they care to talk about.
74	2	"Forum - Unheard Voices: National Council of Women"	9 September 1975
The individual views of women from the Nottingham branch of the National Council of Women
75	3	"Forum - Unheard Voices: The Afro-Caribbean Group of Kentish Town"	10 September 1975
The Afro-Caribbean Group of Kentish Town are a Youth Club and present their views on the state of the nation and other concerns.
76	4	"Forum - Unheard Voices: Naval and Military Club"	11 September 1975
The Naval and Military Club present their views on the state of the nation and other concerns.
77	5	"Forum - Unheard Voices: North Gawber Colliery Miners' Welfare"	12 September 1975
Miners and their wives from North Gawber Colliery Miners' Welfare, near Barnsley, Yorkshire present their views on the state of the nation and other concerns.
78	6	"Forum - Unheard Voices: Conclusion"	13 September 1975
Groups of people - whose attitudes and ideas are not commonly given direct expression in the media - have been invited to put forward their views on the state of the nation, or anything else they care to talk about. Two people from each group meet for the first time, elect a chairman, and search for common ground between their various viewpoints in an unedited discussion.
79	7	"Gentle Ghost - an Eye to the Future"	20 September 1975
Gentle Ghost provides employment; services from Architecture to Astrology; evening classes, a restaurant and a counselling, advice and information service. The theme of the programme is modern man's headlong flight from nature, both his own and that surrounding him, and the need to reverse this process.
80	8	"Routes of Conflict"	27 September 1975
The Conflict Research Society studies conflicts to better understand human conflict.
81	9	"More than a Place to Live"	4 October 1975
The Society for Co-operative Dwellings assists the development of locally owned and managed housing co-operatives. It was responsible for the first such scheme in Britain. This programme explains the principles of housing co-operatives and discusses their part in solving our accommodation crisis.
82	10	"Four different groups"	11 October 1975
Features four different groups: Chickens' Lib (from Oxfordshire) fighting for chickens' rights, Mufon (from Manchester) who scientifically investigate UFO's, Disablement Income Group (DIG) (from Newcastle) fighting for a fair income for every disabled person, and the English National Party (ENP) (from London).
83	11	"Help for the Blind by the Blind"	18 October 1975
Projects by the Blind, Hammersmith, is an educational, counselling and social centre run by the blind for the blind and their sighted friends. The organisation already produces sound newspapers and magazines, but this is their first television programme.
84	12	"The Pre-School Playgroups Association"	25 October 1975
The Pre-School Playgroups Association is a nationwide movement of self-help groups for families with young children. Discuss questions such as 'What is a play-group? Who are the people behind it? What are their aims?'.
85	13	"So You Think It's a Free Country"	1 November 1975
Presented by the National Council for Civil Liberties (Liberty (advocacy group)) who are concerned with problems such as wrongful arrest, refusal of bail and conspiracy.
86	14	"So You Think It's a Free Country"	8 November 1975
Repeated episode (see above episode 13).
87	15	"North Devon Farm Workers: An everyday story"	15 November 1975
Presented by a group of North Devon Farm Workers.
88	16	"Hunt Saboteurs Association/Great Masters"	22 November 1975
Presented by Hunt Saboteurs Association, a militant anti-blood sports group. Margaret Rae (musical medium) and Coral Polge (psychic artists) also experiment to receive messages.
89	17	"Take Five Girls"	29 November 1975
Presented by five 16-year-old girls from a mixed comprehensive school at Crowthorne, Berkshire.
90	18	"Tribunal"	6 December 1975
Workers from Bradford re-enact a story of unemployment benefit.
91	19	"Much of the Day"	13 December 1975
Presented by Trinity Arts - Small Heath. One day's activities of a Community Arts Project working on a long-term basis in an inner ring area of Birmingham. The programme shows the possibilities for community involvement in the creative use of a derelict site.
92	20	"So this is Christmas"	20 December 1975
St Agnes's Church Hall in Moseley, Birmingham, is the unlikely setting for a live television community Christmas Party for more than 100 people from all over the British Isles. Among the entertainers : a steel band, folk singers, puppet theatre and a dancing dragon. And the Open Door community - people who've made their own programmes over the past three years - provide the interviewers and interviewees. They show what can be done by way of help and self-help for those for whom Christmas might otherwise be a lonely, bitter experience.

=== Series 8 (1976) ===
No. overall	No. in season	Title	Original release date
93	1	"The Vegan Society: To a Brighter Future"	31 January 1976
Presented by The Vegan Society who believe that animal products involve cruelty and waste of the resources needed by the world's hungry.
94	2	"All Work and No Pay"	7 February 1976
Presented by the Wages for Housework Campaign.
95	3	"The Kite and Cambridge"	14 February 1976
Cambridge is threatened by a huge shopping complex with parking for 2,500 cars. Kite Community Action opposes it. This programme shows the risk of destroying city centres for motorised shoppers.
96	4	"The Cautionary Tale of Emmanuel Blob"	21 February 1976
Peter Seabrook talks to Philip Swindells about water plants and Bob Hopkins about bedding plants and explains the geometry Elizabethan knot gardens and showcases Chapman's Garden at Emmanuel College, Cambridge.
97	5	"The British Campaign to Stop Immigration"	28 February 1976
The British Campaign to Stop Immigration present their belief that freedom of speech should be granted to all, and that there is a 'veil of censorship' on the subject.
98	6	"More than Enough"	6 March 1976
The Society, Religion and Technology Project (in Scotland) sets out to challenge our attitudes to the problems of a hungry world.
99	7	"Anything! Anytime! Any problem is no problem"	13 March 1976
Presented by the Friends Anonymous Service. The episode is a dramatisation of a typical 48 hours at Friendship House, Hackney-headquarters, a round-the-clock voluntary social service agency.
100	8	"A Child with Something Extra"	20 March 1976
Presented by The Down's Babies Association and The Southend 0-2,2-5 Groups. Demonstrates that, with the right sort of guidance given to parents, children with down's syndrome develop to a far higher degree than was thought.
101	9	"Ponies for Sale! 50 Pence!"	3 April 1976
Presents the history of Ponies of Britain, founded in 1952 by Miss Gladys Yule and Mrs Glenda Spooner. Showcases The Ponies of Britain Stallion Show, held annually at Ascot.
102	10	"Are we Special?"	10 April 1976
Presented by pupils at Red Lodge School in Southampton, which educates those aged between 12 and 16, and seeks to dispel some of the public's misconceptions about schools for children with learning difficulties.
103	11	"Split-Up"	24 April 1976
Presents the effects of divorce on families.
104	12	"Speak with One Voice"	1 May 1976
The Birmingham Clarion Singers, a socialist musical group, present the history of May Day in contemporary music and song on the 50th Anniversary of the General Strike.
105	13	"Once Upon a Line"	8 May 1976
Presented by the Cambrian Coast Line Action Group and tells the story of the fight to save one of Britain's most scenic railways - from Machynlleth to Pwllheli.
106	14	"Fluoridation and Truth Decay/The Real Forgotten"	15 May 1976
The National Pure Water Association presents their opposition to medicine as opposed to the benefits of tap water. The Sergeants Nicholson also present their campaign for better pensions for ex-regular servicemen.
107	15	"Who Gets the Benefit?"	22 May 1976
The Claimants' union present an episode about the social security system.
108	16	"Looks Back"	29 May 1976
To mark 100 episodes made by more than 100 groups and individuals. Some of the groups talk to Chris Dunkley, television critic of the Financial Times, about what they achieved with their programmes.

=== Series 9 (1976) ===
No. overall	No. in season	Title	Original release date
109	1	"Liverpool - Housing"	20 September 1976
A special week presenting issues facing Liverpool. This episode discusses the state of housing.
110	2	"Liverpool - Racialism"	21 September 1976
This episodes discusses racialism and asks the question 'has the existence over 50 years of black communities in Liverpool led to a decline in racial conflict?'
111	3	"Liverpool - Education"	22 September 1976
Discusses education and also takes a look at teaching yourself fire eating.
112	4	"Liverpool - Move"	23 September 1976
113	5	"Liverpool - Unemployment"	24 September 1976
Focuses on women's fight for equality in Liverpool.
114	6	"All Against the Bomb"	1 October 1976
Presented by Nuclear Disarmament who do not believe in having and using nuclear weapons.
115	7	"A Place to Live"	8 October 1976
Presented by The Mobile Home Residents' Association.
115	8	"Vote for Good Health"	15 October 1976
Presented by The Campaign for a Democratic Health Service who believe that the health service would be improved by patients and workers having a real say in how it is run.
116	9	"I'm sorry, I didn't see you/Flower Arranging"	22 October 1976
Presented by The British Motorcyclist' Federation promoting a safer traffic attitude between motorists and motorcyclists. Alan Power and Robbie Smith, from Merseyside, also discuss wanting to change the image of flower arrangers and class.
117	10	"Gie's a Break"	29 October 1976
Presented by The Six Circle Group who promote mutual community service.
118	11	"The Forgotten Marshes"	5 November 1976
Presented by The Dickens Country Protection Society who came together in 1971 under the threat of the construction of a giant oil refinery on the Kent marshes.
119	12	"Schools of Our Choice?"	13 November 1976
Presented by Friends of the Education Voucher Experiment, a group who believe parents should be able to choose their child's education through a voucher system.
120	13	"A Time to be Living"	20 November 1976
Presented by Anchor Housing Association through the eyes of tenants to show how the elderly can lead active lives in their own homes.
121	14	"The Right to Return"	26 November 1976
Presented by Free Palestine and Palestine Action. Andrew Faulds, MP, traces the Palestinians' plight from the creation of the state of Israel in 1948, and presents the case with Peter Hain, Leila Mantoura, Avika Orr and David Watkins, MP.
122	15	"Glad to be Gay?"	3 December 1976
Presented by The Scottish Minorities Group, who work for the rights and welfare of gay men and women. Members of the organisation discuss the advice and facilities available to gay men and lesbians in Edinburgh and explain what it means for them to have access to like-minded people who can understand their problems.
123	16	"Science Fiction Goes to School"	10 December 1976
Presented by The Science Fiction Foundation who believe that science-fiction can play an important role in education.
124	17	"Save Our Theatre"	17 December 1976
Presented by Theatro Technis, a group started as a focal point for the local Cypriot Community in North London.
125	18	"Jim and Maggie"	31 December 1976
Presented by the Half Moon Theatre Company, they create New Years Eve entertainment including music.

=== Series 10 (1977) ===
No. overall	No. in season	Title	Original release date
126	1	"Thank God we were never disbanded"	31 January 1977
Presented by The Josephine Butler Society, a group formed by Victorian social reformer Josephine Butler to campaign for the raising of the age of consent, against state regulated prostitution and against white slavery. The Society campaign for moral standards in sexual relationships.
127	2	"Social Workers - who needs them?"	7 February 1977
Presented by The British Association of Social Workers. Des Wilson introduces the episode which includes a film made in Coventry looking at the role of the Social Worker in 1977.
128	3	"A Black Experience"	14 February 1977
Presented by Harambee Housing Association and tells the story of how in 1972 three black community workers formed a self-help group in the Handsworth area of Birmingham. Demonstrates how, through self-help with community support, they are attempting to deal with the needs of their black community.
129	4	"Feet First"	28 February 1977
Presented by The Pedestrian's Association for Road Safety.
130	5	"To Live in Peace"	7 March 1977
Presented by The Anglo-Israeli Friendship Leagues and introduced by Patrick Cosgrave and Paul Johnson.
131	6	"The Medicine Makers"	14 March 1977
Presented by pharmacist Dr Neil Stevenson who hopes to change people's minds on people's view of medicine, science and pharmaceutical drugs.
132	7	"A Good Old Daze"	21 March 1977
Presented by The Save London's Theatre's Campaign. A musical melodrama, starring John Gielgud, Penelope Keith and Leonard Sachs, traces the history of the attack on the nation's theatres from property speculators and the battle to protect cultural heritage.
133	8	"Marriage Guidance"	28 March 1977
Presented by The National Marriage Guidance Council, ex-clients and counsellors get together to talk about marriage guidance counselling.
134	9	"EGA Stays OK"	18 April 1977
Presented by The EGA Campaign, documenting the battle by all staff and outside supporters to save the Elizabeth Garrett Anderson Hospital.
135	10	"The Cardboard Camera Show"	25 April 1977
Presented by The Shoreham Youth Workshop.
136	11	"A Matter of National Heritage"	2 May 1977
Presented by The Brooklands Society, telling the story of Brooklands which was constructed in 1907 as the first motor racing circuit and the birthplace of Britain's aircraft industry.
137	12	"Internment in the Divis"	9 May 1977
The first of three episodes from Northern Ireland. Presented by residents of the Divis Flats.
138	14	"To be Seventeen in Belfast"	23 May 1977
Presented by Stephen, Sam, Raymie and Billy who grew up together in the same small area of East Belfast, close to the shipyard.

=== Series 11 (1977) ===
No. overall	No. in season	Title	Original release date
139	1	"Radical Alternatives to Prison"	19 September 1977
Presented by Radical Alternatives to Prison, a group started in 1970 by a group of ex-prisoners and other people disenchanted with the prison reform movement. They believe that prison should be abolished, which poses fundamental questions about crime, the criminal and society.
140	2	"Is there a future for the self-employed?"	26 September 1977
Presented by The Association of Self-Employed People who believe that self-employed people who provide services are threatened by the mania for regulating and licensing every aspect of business life.
141	3	"My Name is Legion"	3 October 1977
Presented by Guideposts Trust with Spike Milligan, David Ennals, MP, and Patrick Jenkin, MP. Guideposts Trust provides a home, friendship and support for a tiny proportion of people in psychiatric hospitals who could be discharged if they had somewhere to go.
142	4	"A Working Experiment"	10 October 1977
Presented by the staff and children of Panmure House, a democratically run unit in central Edinburgh for young people at risk.
143	5	"Children in Harmony"	17 October 1977
Presented by The United Federation of Jazz Bands.
144	6	"A Case Against School Spying"	24 October 1977
Presented by Isaac Evans, exposing the existence of Secret Schools Dossiers and questions the right of local education authorities to collect private information about school-children and their parents.
145	7	"Hunting the Wild Fox"	31 October 1977
Presented by The British Field Sports Society and the Masters of Fox Hounds Association explaining why people in Britain enjoy fox hunting, for example.
146	8	"I Will Make You a Name"	12 November 1977
Presented by The Commonwealth War Graves Commission illustrating their work and present-day significance.
147	9	"Mr Sunshine/Look to, Treble's Going"	14 November 1977
Presented by Elkan Ogunde, who aims to bring African music and dance into British classrooms. St Mark's Bell-ringers also offer an insight into the practice of bell-ringing.
148	10	"A Better Legal System"	21 November 1977
Presented by United Lawyers' Association, a group of lawyers put the case for a single profession which they feel would provide a more modern and effective legal service for all.
149	11	"Black Future"	28 November 1977
A dramatization depicting a group of unemployed young West Indians from Bradford in Britain in 1983. There are two million unemployed and Britain is divided into Welfare Zones and when people try to escape they are hunted by the Youth Control Squad.
150	12	"Family Crisis"	5 December 1977
Presented by Dianne Core, Kate Garowell and Friends of the Family Aid Centre who exist to stop violence in the family as soon as it starts.
151	13	"The Other Cinema: Which Parade's Gone By..."	23 May 1977
Presented by The Other Cinema, an independent film distribution and exhibition company who ask the question as to whether cinema is a necessity in the television age.
152	14	"Looks Back 1977"	19 December 1977
A look back at the episodes from this year.

=== Series 12 (1978) ===
No. overall	No. in season	Title	Original release date
153	1	"A Square Deal for Pensioners"	30 January 1978
Presented by Emily Lindsay from the Islington London Branch of the National Federation of OAPs' Associations, examining the current situation for pensioners.
154	2	"A Woman's Right to Choose"	13 February 1978
Presented by The Abortion Law Reform Association, the 40-year-old pressure group behind the passing of the 1967 Abortion Act. They believe that women should have right to choose to have an abortion on request and for better, more equally distributed facilities for abortion on the NHS.
155	3	"South Africa: The Rifle, the Saracen, and the Gallows"	20 February 1978
Presented by The Anti-Apartheid Movement who are dedicated to fighting white supremacy in Southern Africa. The episode shows Britain's role in bolstering Apartheid and explains how people can help support the Anti-Apartheid struggle. Includes an interview with Joshua Nkomo. Presented by Neil Kinnock, MP.
156	4	"Education Otherwise"	27 February 1978
Presented by Education Otherwise exploring why, as well as how, some parents set about providing their children with an efficient education in their homes.
157	5	"Every Town has an East End"	6 March 1978
Presented by The People of Glasgow's East End who aim to support their community by providing shops, open spaces, doctors and amenities.
158	6	"Democracy, Shamocracy?"	13 March 1978
Presented by Christopher Chataway from The Electoral Reform Campaign, taking a close and critical look at the voting system and demonstrates how it has become unfair and undemocratic.
160	7	"The Blackfriars Dysphasic Group"	20 March 1978
Presented by The Blackfriars Dysphasic Group.
161	8	"Ulysses"	27 March 1978
Presented by Shelburne Girls' School in North London performing an original rock opera performed by the Girls' choir backed by professional musicians telling the legendary love story of Ulysses and Penelope (see, Ulysses).
162	9	"Ukrainians: The People who Couldn't go Home"	10 April 1978
Presented by The Young Ukrainian Forum introducing a community who determinedly retains its national identity, whilst their homeland experiences continuous repression and Russification.
163	10	"Canals"	24 April 1978
Presented by The Inland Waterways Association exploring what is happening to canals and asks why Britain doesn't do what other nations are doing, and reduce the damage to town and country by using fewer lorries and moving goods by water.
164	11	"No Room at the Club"	1 May 1978
Presented by Herbert Street Youth Club telling the story of The Ardoyne, a small Catholic area in North Belfast.
165	12	"The Value of Life"	8 April 1978
Presented by The Human Rights Society who advocate for the Hospice movement and Home Care units. They believe that this type of care recognises the value of every human being of whatever age or however frail, and that they should be made available everywhere in Britain.
166	13	"Closed Door?"	22 April 1978
Presented by Shac from the London Housing Aid Centre asking questions around Britain's housing crisis.

=== Series 13 (1978) ===
No. overall	No. in season	Title	Original release date
167	1	"Swallowing is Believing"	18 September 1978
Presented by Life-Line Project exploring the problems of addiction to prescribed drugs and the increasing demand for them and suggests ways in which this demand could be reduced through a radical rethink of NHS policies and priorities.
168	2	"In Praise of Femininity and the Feminine Woman"	25 September 1978
Presented by David Stayt. The Campaign for the Feminine Woman believe that women should return to traditional female roles within the home and family.
169	3	"Punch-Up!/Dinosaurs in the Playground"	2 October 1978
Punch-Up! is a short comedy film by Ken Ellis which shows the dangers behind the scenes of a Punch and Judy show. Dinosaurs in the Playground made by Clare Calder Marshall shows how a grim Victorian playground in London was transformed by the children, teachers and a group of artists and art students.
170	4	"Streets to Seaside"	10 October 1978
Presented by Bradford Cinderella Club, set up in 1890 by a group of Bradford businessmen who got together to help the under-privileged children in their city.
171	5	"The Family Home"	16 October 1978
Made by the Valley Road Community, Coventry
172	6	"Leisure for All, Work for All"	23 October 1978
Kathleen Smith, The Work and Leisure Society, discusses the balance and benefits of sharing work.
173	7	"SCRAM"	2 November 1978
The Scottish Campaign to Resist the Atomic Menace discuss opposition to nuclear power in Torness and Scotland.
174	8	"A Charter of Choice"	9 November 1978
Presented by The Basildon Joint Tenant/Council Management Committees.
175	9	"Just a Link with the Wild"	19 November 1978
Ed Seager of the Wildlife Youth Project, Mossley, discusses his work and the similarities his story has with that in the book A Kestrel and a Knave and the film Kes. He talks with Author, Barry Hines.
176	10	"The Simon Community"	30 November 1978
Presented by The Simon Community who care and campaign for the homeless and rootless.
177	11	"In with a Head Start?"	7 December 1978
Presented by the National Association for Gifted Children, includes showcasing orienteering in Ulster.
178	12	"STOPP"	25 January 1979
Made by the Society of Teachers Opposed to Physical Punishment.
179	13	"The Wind that Shakes the Barley"	1 February 1979
Presented by Comhaltas Ceoltóirí Éireann (Association of Irish Musicians).
180	14	"Every Child Deserves a Chance"	8 February 1979
Presented by Action in Distress illustrating a simple but unique way in which concerned people in Britain can do something positive to help one individual needy child.
181	15	"EAST"	15 February 1979
Presented by Soapbox Theatre showcasing a community co-operative and advice centre in Newham, East London called EAST.
182	16	"World at Their Fingertips"	22 February 1979
Presented by the Radio Society of Great Britain showing how much there is to Mayday signalling. Presented by Brian Rix, CBE, demonstrating how amateur radio appeals to enthusiasts of all ages, performs valuable community services including emergency communications and involvement with the handicapped and generates goodwill across international frontiers.
183	17	"It Ain't Half Racist Mum"	1 March 1979
Presented by Campaign Against Racism in the Media (CARM) exploring questions around racism, immigration, perceptions of crime and whether television is neutral on the question of race.
184	18	"It's in the Family"	8 March 1979
Presented by The Association to Combat Huntington's Chorea showing families fighting the effects of Huntington's Disease and how practical support in the community can help.
185	19	"Alcoholism - An epidemic in the making"	15 March 1979
Presented by ACCEPT, a voluntary organisation which, in three years, has grown to be the largest drink counselling service and alcoholism treatment centre in the country.
186	20	"Lost Property"	22 March 1979
Presented by Small Landlords Association.
187	21	"The Easterhouse Festival Society"	28 April 1979
Features The Easterhouse Festival Society set up by local people and demonstrates how their efforts are helping to change the image of the Easterhouse community.
188	22	"Signs of Life"	10 May 1979
Presented by the National Union of the Deaf.
189	23	"Work not Waste"	24 May 1979
Presented by the Socialist Environment and Resources Association campaigning with trade unionists to create work, and work which uses raw materials and energy efficiency.
190	24	"The Way Back"	7 June 1979
Presented by Jim Four. Made in collaboration with four young people with special educational needs.
191	25	"Nymphs and Shepherds - 50 Years On"	21 June 1979
Tells the story of the time when, in 1929, 250 Manchester schoolchildren sang 'Nymphs and Shepherds' with the Halle Orchestra. This episode pays tribute to the late Gertrude Riall, their choir-mistress, who instilled in them a love of music and a joy in singing.
192	26	"The Corby Candle Story"	5 July 1979
Presented by the Campaign for the Retention of the Steelworks at Corby (ROSAC).

=== Series 14 (1979) ===
No. overall	No. in season	Title	Original release date
193	1	"Southall on Trial"	22 September 1979
Presented by The Southall Campaign Committee. This episode shows how the local community responded to the events on 23 April 1979, when the National Front held an election meeting in Southall Town Hall and 5,000 police were deployed, 342 people were charged and resulted in the death of Blair Peach. This episode aims to show that only Southall but the whole black community living in Britain is on trial for asserting and defending their right to live in Britain peaceably, free from the fear of racism.
194	2	"Things Ain't What They Used to Be"	13 October 1979
Features the work of the Spinal Injuries Unit at Pinderfields General Hospital, Wakefield.
195	3	"Stand Up and Be Cured"	27 October 1979
Presented by the Legalise Cannabis Campaign.
196	4	"A Better Life - A Better Wife"	10 November 1979
Presented by the Mother's Support Team, Cambridge.
197	5	"Mersey Dragon"	24 November 1979
Presented by Merseyside Chinese Community Services.
198	6	"Wreckers in the Town Hall"	8 December 1979
Presented by Campaign for Demolition Control who are finding ways of fighting for the survival of communities and their homes and for the protection of peoples democratic rights.
199	7	"Killer Joe"	26 January 1980
Presented by The Explosives, a young and mainly black dance group based at the North London College of Further Education. In this episode they use their dancing to tell a story in a performance of Killer Joe.
200	8	"Centre of Unemployment"	2 February 1980
Presented by Newcastle Trades Council Centre for the Unemployed. In this episode they show workers have battled to keep their jobs and how once they've become unemployed the fight continues with the formation of a union for unemployed workers.
201	9	"A Card for Life"	9 February 1980
Presented by the Addenbrooke's Kidney Patients Association, Cambridge.
202	10	"Carry on Comprehensives"	16 February 1980
Presented by The Campaign for Comprehensive Education.
203	11	"Blazing Pedals"	23 February 1980
Presented by The London Cycling Campaign.
204	12	"Guttersnipe"	1 March 1980
Features the Telford Punk fanzine Collective.
205	13	"Walcot Waives the Rules"	8 March 1980
Presented by Bath Arts Workshop.
206	14	"If the good Lord had intended..."	15 March 1980
Presented by The Rydevale Community Nursery who believe that there needs to be much more provision for children growing up in a multiracial society.
207	15	"The Sound of Love"	22 March 1980
Presented by Anthony Hodgins discussing whether adults miss childhood. Includes interviews with Douglas Adams, James Burke, Phil Collins and Elizabeth Garvie.
208	16	"Just a Chunk of Metal"	31 May 1980
Presented by the Swalincote Rifle and Pistol Club.
209	17	"Woodland Rescue"	14 June 1980
Presented by the Woodland Trust who explain their conservation role.
210	18	"Elderly"	28 June 1980
Presented by a group of professional people concerned with the care of the elderly in Merseyside.
211	19	"Wherever We Go"	5 July 1980
Presented by the Romany Guild looking at the problems facing the Romany people.
212	20	"Born Free - Trapped Ever After"	2 July 1980
Presented by North West Spanner Theatre Group, reviews how over 200 episodes have been made of Open Door.

=== Series 15 (1980) ===
No. overall	No. in season	Title	Original release date
213	1	"The Gentle Giant who Cares and Shares"	11 September 1980
Presented by The Craigmillar Festival Society telling the story about how the Festival was created and its legacy.
214	2	"Turn the World Upside Down"	18 September 1980
Presented by a group of Christians working for change.
215	3	"Flowers Can Damage Your Health"	25 September 1980
Presented by medical students from the Royal Free Hospital School of Medicine, London. Explores the proposals in The Flowers Report to amalgamate London's 34 teaching colleges into six.
216	4	"Jamie - A Boy with a Future?"	2 October 1980
Presented by Hilary McLeod telling the story of Jamie, a ten year-old child who is epileptic.
217	5	"I Wish I Could Have Said It Like That"	9 October 1980
Presented by Peter J. Bott telling the story of his experience with stuttering.
218	6	"Hollywood"	16 October 1980
Presented by the Forest Hill Film Unit at Forest Hill School, which started in 1969 when a third-ear class made a documentary film about the dreams of both staff and pupils. This episode, in Wales, shows some of their films from the past ten years.

=== Series 16 (1981) ===
No. overall	No. in season	Title	Original release date
219	1	"The Earth Lover's Guide to the 80s"	25 February 1981
Presented by Birmingham Friends of the Earth who campaign for logical and practical approaches to the Earth's problems.
220	2	"Raw Talent"	4 March 1981
Presented by Walter Lowe paying tribute to everyday entertainers, for example, pranks in families and parents singing in the car.
221	3	"They Came for Us in the Morning..."	11 March 1981
Presented by The Joint Working Group for Latin American Refugees.
222	4	"Swift to Serve"	25 March 1981
Presented by Sarah Gascoine telling the story of the Suffolk Fire Service, a group of men in Stowmarket who leave their normal jobs to help the public attending not only fires but other emergencies.
223	5	"The Oldest Profession"	1 April 1981
Presented by the Environmental Health Officers' Association in Cambridge showing a typical days work by members of the 'oldest profession in local government'.
224	6	"It's Bootle—But Is It Art?"	8 April 1981
Presented by Art in Action, a community photography project on Merseyside, who have received negative reaction from their local council by bringing to the public eye images of a deprived dockland community.
225	7	"No Home-No Hope"	15 April 1981
Presented by the Edinburgh Council for Single Homeless who suggest what needs to be done to stop young people becoming long-term social problems.
226	8	"Another Existence"	22 April 1981
Presented by the Disablement Income Group providing an insight into hidden costs of disablement and stresses the difficulties encountered when claims are made for the meagre allowances offered by the state.

=== Series 17 (1982) ===
No. overall	No. in season	Title	Original release date
227	1	"Protect and Survive"	30 January 1982
Tells the story of the public information campaign Protect and Survive on civil defence.
228	2	"Oxford: The Other Image"	6 February 1982
Presented by the Jubilee 77 Association of Blackbird Leys, an estate in Oxford deprived of amenities. The Association was founded by Cath Walters.
229	3	"Life in Care"	13 February 1982
Presented by The National Association of Young People in Care showcasing the opinions of the children who live in children's home.
230	4	"Fit...as a Fiddle"	20 February 1982
Presented by the Trade Union International Research and Education Group and narrated by John Shirley.
231	5	"What About Your Ma—Is Your Da Still Workin'?"	27 February 1982
Presented by the Fellowship Community Theatre, Belfast Turf Lodge. This episode is a comedy play reflecting the working-class lives of the people who live in Belfast Turf Lodge.
232	6	"Could it Happen to You?"	6 March 1982
Discusses the issue of bankruptcy.
233	7	"A Second Chance to Learn"	13 March 1982
Presented by members of the Second Chance to Learn course, a unique adult education experiment in Liverpool.
234	8	"Attitudes—The Second Handicap"	20 March 1982
Presented by Chris Davies, a severely disabled man, who examines the various ways society complicates life and worsens the effect of physical disability.
235	9	"There Ought to Be Clowns"	27 March 1982
Presented by Clown Cavalcade discussing the history of Clowns in Britain and wider culture.
236	10	"It's a Lovely Day Tomorrow"	3 April 1982
Presented by members of the Claimants and Unemployed Workers Union created by Joe Kenyon.
237	11	"The House that Mum and Dad Built"	10 March 1982
Presented by the Lewisham Self Build Housing Association.
238	12	"The Full Cost?"	17 April 1982
Presented by Imperial College Students' Union President Nick Morton exploring the issues around the Government's decision in 1979 to introduce the idea of 'full cost' fees for students from other countries who want to study in Britain.
239	13	"A Right to a Living"	24 April 1982
Presented by the Amble Fishermen's Association who aim to get the British public behind them and knowing more about their industry.
240	14	"Crazy Dream"	1 May 1982
241	15	"On Foot in the Countryside"	8 May 1982
Presented by Stoke Caribbean Enterprises who want to create an art centre which will bring work, art, hopes and harmony to their local multi-racial community.
242	16	"The Not the Finger in the Ear Show"	15 May 1982
Presented by Ian A. Anderson showcasing some of the music and atmosphere found in England's many folk music clubs.
243	17	"Spitalfields in Crisis"	22 May 1982
Presented by The Spitalfields Housing and Planning Rights Service who ask why poor conditions been allowed to persist and shows how Government cuts and the spread of offices have savaged old-established working-class communities.
244	18	"Goodbye to All That"	29 May 1982
Presented by Action on Smoking and Health Smokers.

=== Series 18 (1982) ===
No. overall	No. in season	Title	Original release date
245	1	"Who's Killing Croxteth?"	2 September 1982
Presented by the Croxteth Community Action Committee, showing how Croxteth suffers from unemployment, poor housing conditions, juvenile crime. They are advocating to keep the comprehensive school open but Sir Keith Joseph wishes to close it and since 9 July, the group have been occupying the school.
246	2	"A Race Apart?"	2 February 1983
Presented by the Irish in Britain Representation Group, Manchester.
247	3	"Fighting on the Beaches"	9 February 1983
Presented by the Brighton and Hove Unemployed Workers' Union and Centre made by unemployed people in Brighton who are determined to fight back and to put an end to the contrast in the south east between poverty and affluence.
248	4	"Racism—The Fourth R"	16 February 1983
Presented by the All London Teachers Against Racism and Fascism.
249	5	"Why Their News is Bad News"	23 February 1983
Presented by Julie Christie and Julie Walters and the Campaign for Press and Broadcasting Freedom. This episode asks the question whether we are all equally well-served by news media and includes interviews with Anthony Barnett, Anthony Wedgwood, MP, Ken Livingstone and Steve Forey.
250	6	"Shyness, Handicap or Happiness?"	2 March 1983
Presented by Bernard Goodsall, a self-confessed shy person, exploring shyness.
251	7	"Jobs for the Boys?"	9 March 1983
Presented by the Women's Engineering Society.
252	8	"The Uphill Struggle"	16 March 1983
Presented by the Hillclimb and Sprint Association.
253	9	"America: We Can Do That"	30 March 1983
Presented by Chris Davies exploring the disabled rights movement in the USA.

== Reception ==
At the time of its original transmission, Open Door received poor critical reception. Fowler and Harle argues that the series, in hindsight, "remains a major social and cultural history collection that deserves consideration." Indeed, when the series ended in 1983, The Sunday Times observed:

If you were looking for suitable material for a time capsule to represent the last ten years in Britain, you might do worse than bury a list of the 250-odd Open Door programmes that have been broadcast by the BBC since April 1973.

— D Campbell, Sunday Times Supplement (24 July 1983)

=== Notable episodes ===
==== "Transex Liberation Group" (1973) ====
An early episode of Open Door, featured in the first series, was hosted by members belonging to the Transex Liberation Group. It featured four speakers discussing together their experiences of transitioning, covering issues around discrimination, using public bathrooms, employment, as well as positive aspects of their lives such as romantic relationships. In a 1973 memo discussing the running order for the first series, Rowan Ayers cites the episode for broadcast and describes it as a "serious attempt to present the problems facing those who undergo a sex change operation" and says the group wish to make the programme "to break down the prejudices that must exist."

==== "The British Campaign to Stop Immigration" (1976) ====
Broadcast in February 1976 by the right-wing The British Campaign to Stop Immigration group, this episode of Open Door put forth the argument for greater freedom of speech for all. The programme was a controversial because the group were linked with the fascist group the National Front. Adding to the criticism was the BBC's decision to air a repeat of the programme despite the initial backlash. In a document containing the minutes for a Board Room meeting on 5 March 1976, BBC representatives and anti-racist campaigners discussed the decision to repeat the programme. In attendance was Sidney Bidwell MP, a representative for the Indian Workers' Association, a representative for the Association of Jewish Ex-Servicemen, a representative for the Standing Conference of Pakistani Organisations, John Ennals, then Director of the United Kingdom Immigrants Advisory Service, Debbie Page from the National Union of Students, Kenneth Lamb, Director of Public Affairs at the BBC, P.H. Scott, Chief Assistant to the Director General at the BBC, and D.B. Mann the Secretariat. Those against the episode's repeat contested that it constituted an incitement to racial hatred, which would be criminal. The BBC argued that lawyers had approved the episode's transmission and dismissed the idea that a single programme could have the effect being claimed. As a solution the BBC said they would provide a 'right of reply' to anti-racist campaigners, and as a result commissioned the episode "It Ain't Half Racist, Mum" in 1979.

==== "It Ain't Half Racist, Mum" (1979) ====
One of the most well-known episodes of Open Door was aired in March 1979 entitled "It Ain't Half Racist, Mum" and presented by the Campaign Against Racism in the Media (CARM). The episode is thirty-minutes in length and comments on racism in the British media. The episode features British sociologist Stuart Hall giving a close reading of the 1970s sitcom It Ain't Half Hot Mum and arguing that the show perpetuates racism. Hall further presents examples of racism from current affairs and news programmes, including a clip from Tonight where Denis Tuohy interviews American white supremacist David Duke asking for his message to the audience of Britain. Duke replies "One of the main things is that they are not alone, that there are white people all over the globe who sympathise with them." In another clip from an interview by the BBC political correspondent Robin Day, Hall explains that Day essentially frames his questions to advocate for immigration. British actress Maggie Steed narrates the programme and she opens the episode explaining:

We hope to show you that many of the programmes that are under the editorial control of the BBC and ITV are themselves biased and unbalanced, especially in the coverage they give to Britain's black community. Not only is a lot of this coverage not neutral but it actually reinforces racism.

— Maggie Steed, "It Ain't Half Racist, Mum", Open Door (1979)

Interviewed, by BBC Radio 4, about the episode Maggie Steed explained she didn't feel the BBC took on board the criticism levied at it and other institutions in the programme, saying "it [the episode] was greeted with a sort of disdain." Indeed, during production, the BBC and ITV both refused access to some of their footage being used. Then head of BBC News, Alan Protheroe complained, in a committee meeting of news and current affairs editors, "[...] why should an organisation that campaigns against racism in the media, which might well accuse myself and my staff of racism, be given privilege treatment?"

Three months after the broadcast of it "It Ain't Half Racist, Mum", the BBC issued a statement distancing themselves from the programme. The BBC explained:

The BBC regrets that the Open Door programme broadcast on the 1st and 4th March this year by the "Campaign against Racism in the Media" could be taken as implying that Mr Robin-Day had conducted a programme about immigration with a racist bias. The BBC considers that any such indication would be wholly unjustified.

— BBC (1979)

== Legacy ==
Open Door was the subject of an exhibition entitled People Make Television at Raven Row, a non-profit contemporary art exhibition centre in London. The exhibition ran from 28 January to 26 March 2023 and was curated by Lori E Allen, William Fowler, Matthew Harle and Alex Sainsbury. Visitors were able to browse production material from Open Door designed by Jonas Neville, and watch archival footage in a mediatheque. In a review reflecting on the importance of both People Make Television and Open Door itself, J. J. Charlesworth wrote for ArtReview it "draws our attention to the emerging character of the new cultural and political forms that, seeded during the 1970s, have come to define and dominate politics and culture now." Curators of the exhibition, Fowler and Harle believe that Open Door is culturally and historically significant writing that it should be remembered "as an affective political history of a period that bridges the unravelling of the post-war settlement to Thatcherism." Indeed, Harle and Fowler believe that the catalogue of Open Door episodes should made more widely known because it could play a vital role demonstrating how citizens can have an active role in television and media.

Access to Open Door and some of its archival footage, including episodes, were rediscovered and released as part of The Connected Histories of the BBC project. The project was led by the University of Sussex in collaboration with the BBC, Mass Observation, the Science Museum Group and the British Entertainment History Project, and funded by the Arts and Humanities Research Council (AHRC). Open Door was featured in the BBC—Oral History Collection also known as "100 Voices that made the BBC: People Nation and Empire' curated by Emeritus Professor David Hendy and Dr Alban Webb, among others. Hendy explained the legacy of Open Door as "the BBC effectively abandoning its traditional concern with 'balance' and handing over total editorial control to groups who rarely get a voice – certainly not on a national institution such as the BBC. Nothing like it had been seen on TV before.

== See also ==
- BBC Genome Project
