= Mike Appleton =

British television producer (1936–2020)

- Born: Michael John Wilmot Appleton; 30 December 1936; Margate, England
- Died: 2 April 2020 (aged 83); Chertsey, England
- Occupation: Television producer
- Years active: 1958–2000
- Spouse: Lulu Lewin (m. 1967)
- Children: 2

Michael John Wilmot Appleton (30 December 1936 – 2 April 2020) was a British television producer and director who produced the BBC Television music series The Old Grey Whistle Test.

== Background ==
Appleton was born in Margate, Kent, and moved in 1946 with his parents to Bristol. He attended Wells Cathedral School, before being conscripted into military service in Germany, where he learned sound recording techniques.

== Career ==
Appleton joined the BBC in Bristol in 1958, working on radio programmes, and then transferred to the television service in London. He became a production assistant on the arts magazine programme Late Night Line-Up, before focusing on the programme's spin-off music shows, Colour Me Pop and Disco 2, produced by Rowan Ayers.

In 1971, Appleton became the producer of a new weekly programme on BBC2, The Old Grey Whistle Test. Appleton was responsible for the show's title and its format, including both live and pre-recorded performances by alternative rock acts, as well as interviews. One of its early presenters, Richard Williams, said: "Starting with virtually no budget and the smallest studio in the BBC’s Television Centre, Mike Appleton turned The Old Grey Whistle Test into the most effective vehicle for the burgeoning rock culture of the 1970s." It continued to develop through the late 1970s and 1980s, with an expanded budget and an ability to reflect changing musical tastes.

In December 1980, Appleton put together a tribute show to John Lennon, on the evening of his death. He was also responsible for ensuring that the shows were recorded for posterity rather than being discarded, as had been the previous practice. The success of The Old Grey Whistle Test led to Appleton working on special live shows by artists such as the Rolling Stones and Bruce Springsteen, as well as Executive Producing the British end of the Live Aid concert in 1985, for which he won a BAFTA Award.

When The Old Grey Whistle Test ended in 1987 after 16 years, Appleton produced the Nelson Mandela 70th Birthday Tribute concert the following year, before leaving the BBC to join The Landscape Channel. He also expanded his collection of old phonographs and gramophones, claimed to be the best collection in Europe. He continued to direct until retiring in 2000.

== Personal life and death ==
In 1967, Appleton married Lucille "Lulu" Lewin, a designer and psychotherapist. They had a daughter and a foster daughter. In retirement, he lived in Cobham, Surrey.

On 2 April 2020, Appleton died at St Peter's Hospital, Chertsey, from complications of COVID-19, during the pandemic.
