= Colour Me Pop =

- Genre: Music
- Directed by: Steve Turner
- Country of origin: United Kingdom
- No. of seasons: 1
- No. of episodes: 53 (48 missing)

Production
- Production company: BBC

Original release
- Network: BBC 2
- Release: 14 June 1968 – 30 August 1969

Colour Me Pop is a British music television programme broadcast on BBC2 from 1968 to 1969. It was a spin-off from the BBC 2 arts magazine show Late Night Line-Up. Designed to celebrate the new introduction of colour to British television, it was directed by Steve Turner, and showcased half-hour sets by pop and rock groups of the period. The programme was a precursor to the BBC music programme The Old Grey Whistle Test. Unlike its successor, most of the editions of Colour Me Pop are missing, due to the BBC's archival policy of the time.

== Complete list of performances ==
14 June 1968 Manfred Mann
21 June 1968 The Small Faces
28 June 1968 Eclection
12 July 1968 Salena Jones with The Brian Lemon Trio
19 July 1968 Fleetwood Mac
26 July 1968 The Kinks
9 August 1968 The Peddlers
16 August 1968 The Tremeloes
23 August 1968 Barry Noble
30 August 1968 Spooky Tooth
7 September 1968 The Hollies
14 September 1968 The Moody Blues
21 September 1968 Unit 4 + 2
28 September 1968 David Ackles
5 October 1968 O'Hara's Playboys
12 October 1968 Honeybus, Clodagh Rodgers
2 November 1968 Eclection, Spooky Tooth, Jethro Tull
9 November 1968 Foggy Dew-O, Lou Prinze and the Bedrocks
16 November 1968 The Nice
23 November 1968 The Alan Price Set, Julie Driscoll and The Brian Auger Trinity
30 November 1968 Giles, Giles and Fripp
7 December 1968 Timebox
14 December 1968 Love Sculpture
21 December 1968 Bonzo Dog Doo-Dah Band
28 December 1968 repeat of Hollies edition
4 January 1969 The Move
11 January 1969 Sons And Lovers
16 January 1969 Pop-Tops
25 January 1969 The Toast
1 February 1969 Chicken Shack
6 February 1969 Bobby Hanna, The Art Movement
15 February 1969 The Equals, Barbara Ruskin
22 February 1969 The Marmalade
1 March 1969 Ten Years After
8 March 1969 World of Oz
15 March 1969 Caravan
22 March 1969 Harmony Grass
12 April 1969 Free
19 April 1969 Jimmy Campbell, Sweet Thursday
26 April 1969 Elastic Band
10 May 1969 Family
17 May 1969 Cats Eyes
31 May 1969 Group Therapy
7 June 1969 Lions of Judah
14 June 1969 Strawbs (who also invited David Bowie along to perform mime to one track "Poor Jimmy Wilson", with his producer Tony Visconti)
5 July 1969 Trapeze (at Laf), Samson
12 July 1969 Copperfield
26 July 1969 Orange Bicycle
2 August 1969 The Love Affair, Philip Goodhand-Tait
9 August 1969 Gene Pitney backed by the Mike Cotton Sound
30 August 1969 The Fortunes
(Unbroadcast editions)
---.---.--- The Chambers Brothers
---.---.--- Gullivers People
---.---.--- Sands
---.---.--- Jefferson AKA Geoff Turton backed by Sight & Sound
---.---.--- Golden Earring

In addition, two compilation programmes were compiled and broadcast over the 1969/70 festive season:

27 December 1969: excerpts from the Bonzo Dog Band, Caravan, Copperfield, Harmony Grass, The Nice, The Peddlers, Gene Pitney, Spooky Tooth and Trapeze editions
3 January 1970: excerpts from the David Ackles, Jimmy Campbell, Hollies, Honeybus, Clodagh Rodgers and Samson editions.

There is a common misconception that The Mothers of Invention appeared on the show. This is because a studio session (consisting of 'Oh in the Sky' and 'King Kong'), recorded for Colour Me Pop's parent programme Late Night Line-Up on 23 October 1968 was incorrectly billed as being from Colour Me Pop when an excerpt was reused in the 1991 BBC2 series Sounds of the Sixties. Since it was never originally broadcast as a Colour Me Pop and used a different director and studio, this performance cannot be considered part of the series.

== Surviving material ==
Visuals
Currently only the editions featuring The Small Faces, The Moody Blues, and The Move are held in the BBC archive, as well as the episode featuring The Chambers Brothers that was never broadcast. In addition, 5 songs from the Bonzo Dog Doo Dah Band edition survive, plus film inserts from the Trapeze/Samson and Clodagh Rodgers/Honeybus editions, and a black and white trailer for the Salena Jones show.

Other material that is known to exist outside the BBC includes: b/w tele-recordings of the complete Hollies and Nice editions, an additional film insert from the Bonzo Dog Doo Dah Band show of Vivian Stanshall's band introductions', and silent film inserts from the Orange Bicycle edition are held by the Kaleidoscope archive. There also exists a b/w French TV-shot promo film for The Hollies "Listen to Me" that was filmed during their Colour Me Pop recording. A 1969 Dutch documentary on Golden Earring features a performance of 'It's Alright, But I Admit It Could Be Better' from their unbroadcast CMP show. 18 frames of film (totalling under a seconds continuous footage) from the Barbara Ruskin edition is preserved in a contemporary piece of sheet music, Off-monitor screenshots exist from the Honeybus (8 images) Sons and Lovers (2 images) and the Giles Giles and Fripp, Toast and Elastic Band (1 image each) editions.

Audio
Audio from the shows starring Fleetwood Mac, The Kinks, The Hollies, Barry Noble, David Ackles, Julie Driscoll and Brian Auger, Giles Giles and Fripp, Love Sculpture, Bonzo Dog Doo Dah Band, Sons and Lovers, Chicken Shack, Ten Years After, Caravan, Harmony Grass, Free, Family and Love Affair is known to survive.

== Availability ==
Most of the Small Faces edition was commercially released as part of the 'All Or Nothing 1965–1968' DVD in 2009, and in 2018 the entire show was issued on the 50th anniversary edition of Ogdens' Nut Gone Flake. The Moody Blues edition was released as part of their 'Timeless Flight' box set in 2013, and again on the 50th anniversary edition of In Search of the Lost Chord in 2018. The Move's edition was included on their 'Magnetic Waves of Sound' CD/DVD release in 2017. The off-air audio of The Kinks edition was included on the 'Kinks at the BBC' box set in 2012. This was followed by the pre-broadcast audio of the show as prepared by Ray Davies (featuring two additional songs, 'Lazy Old Sun' and 'Monica' that did not make the final broadcast) being featured on the 50th anniversary The Kinks are the Village Green Preservation Society box set in 2018.

The audio of two songs from the Love Affair edition were issued on their 3CD collection 'Time Hasn't Changed Us' in 2015. The audio of the Family edition was issued on the 'Family at the BBC' limited edition box in 2018. The audio used for the Giles Giles and Fripp edition (not an off air but prerecordings produced by Peter Giles to be played back during broadcast) was included on 'The Brondesbury Tapes' CD release in 2001. The audio of Trapeze's 3 song live set on Colour Me Pop was included on the 2020 Cherry Red reissue of their debut album.

Videos identified as being taken from the programme can be seen on the YouTube website, including recordings of The Bonzo Dog Band, The Nice, The Moody Blues, The Hollies, The Chambers Brothers, The Move, and The Small Faces.
