= Late Night Line-Up =

British TV discussion programme (1964–1972)

Late Night Line-Up is a British television discussion programme broadcast on BBC2 between 1964 and 1972.

== Background ==
From its launch in April 1964, BBC2 began each evening's transmission with a programme called Line-Up, a ten-minute collection of reviews and previews of the channel's output, presented initially by Denis Tuohy. Although intended to draw attention to the considerable variety of original programming on BBC2, Line-Up was perceived as little more than a self-promotion exercise by the newspapers and the viewing public alike. Later in the year, it was decided that Line-Up be replaced by something of a similar intention but with a more intellectual edge. Instead of a guided tour of BBC2's output, the new programme would be an open and candid discussion among invited guests, transmitted live after the 9.00 p.m. watershed. The new programme was named Late Night Line-Up and took over from Line-Up in September 1964.

The original theme tune was "Blue Boy" by Gerry Mulligan, replaced in the 1970s with a version of "Jordu" by the Dave Hancock Six.

== Content ==
Denis Tuohy carried over his presenter's role from Line-Up but the new programme also brought Joan Bakewell to prominence as a broadcaster. A feature of Late Night Line-Up was that it was scheduled as the last programme of the evening before closedown. This meant that the discussion need not be constrained by time; topics could be explored as far as the participants were willing to talk about them. (Another open-ended discussion programme, After Dark, began on Channel 4 fifteen years after Late Night Line-Up had ceased production.)

Broadcasting hours on British television were tightly controlled by the Postmaster General in the 1960s, and, for the majority of the 1960s, weeknights on BBC Two were limited to seven hours of programming in a day (excluding sport, political conferences, schools, religion and adult education which were exempt from the restrictions). As BBC Two would normally only air for 30 minutes in the morning at 11 a.m. with Play School, this meant 6½ hours were left over; with BBC Two normally starting their evening at 7.00 p.m., it meant Late-Night Line-Up could remain on the air until 1.30 am if they so wished. It never happened, but the freedom for discussion, without worrying about exceeding the broadcasting day allowance made the programme very popular, especially with those who watched television late at night, as BBC One and ITV generally closed down by 11.45 p.m. each weeknight.

Participating in the discussion were television personalities, subject experts and members of the public with relevant experience. For example, a real-life single mother might be invited to discuss a drama themed around single parenthood. Some panelists were deliberately chosen to talk about something outside their usual sphere of expertise. In one edition, the playwright Harold Pinter held his own on the subject of cricket, even when his fellow panelists were a distinguished cricketer and a cricket journalist.

Late Night Line-Up eventually went well beyond its initial remit of examining BBC2's output and came to incorporate interviews, live music and poetry performances and discussions of other TV channels (which meant ITV to all intents and purposes) and even current affairs issues. However, television criticism was always seen as the main focus, a fact which did not endear the programme to the BBC's senior executives. Presenter Tuohy quotes the then head of Light Entertainment, Tom Sloan, as saying: "We now employ two kinds of broadcaster: those who make programmes and those who knock them.... Don't ask me why we do it."

On 26 May 2008 Late Night Line-Up returned for a special one-off edition as part of BBC Parliament's Permissive Night. Presented by Joan Bakewell, it featured discussion of the themes and programmes shown over the course of the evening and examined the liberalising legislation passed by Parliament in the late 1960s. Archive programmes shown included editions of Man Alive, Panorama, Twenty-Four Hours and Late Night Line-Up.

== Crew of Late Night Line-Up ==
- Rowan Ayers, producer
- Michael Fentiman, producer
- Joan Bakewell
- Denis Tuohy
- John Stone
- Michael Dean
- Nicholas Tresilian
- Sheridan Morley
- Tony Bilbow
- Philip Jenkinson
- Noel Picarda
- Terry Hughes, director
- Steve Turner, director
- David Heeley, director
- Colin Strong, director
- Tom Corcoran, director
- Granville Jenkins, director
- Michael Appleton, producer
- Richard Drewett, producer

== Episode guide ==
As with many shows of its era, much of Late Night Line-Up no longer survives. This was not only due to videotapes being wiped, but the programme's usual live broadcast meant they were often not recorded at all. Some records do survive containing many dates and details of these shows.

=== 1964 ===
- Interview With Miss Foyle – Foyle's Bookstore / Interview With Mr *Tompkins – Bookseller/ Screaming Lord Sutch Interview 27 August 1964
- History of The Radio Times 23 September 1964

=== 1965 ===
- Ralph Richardson Interview 3 February 1965
- Ted Ray 9 March 1965
- Robert Morley On Exercise 18 March 1965
- Peter Sellers Interview 19 March 1965
- Duke Ellington 26 March 1965
- BBC2 Opening Night Delay/BBC2 Critics/ Rick Jones 20 April 1965
- Ken Dodd / Allan Smethurst And Cluff's Dog 14 May 1965
- Debussy / Marianne Faithfull / Writers World – Rowena Bingham / Oxford Union Debate – "This House Would Not Fight For Crown And Country" / David Jacobs' Daughter – Carol / Alan David and Peter Cook 22 May 1965
- Z-Cars – Troy Kennedy Martin Interview 26 May 1965
- Spies 26 June 1965
- Bing Crosby 6 July 1965
- Michael Crawford On Late Night TV 31 July 1965
- Late Night Line-Up – In the Republic of Ireland 4 August 1965
- Robin Day Interview 8 August 1965
- Virginia and Bob Manry 27 August 1965
- Kristin Brihn / Donovan 8 September 1965
- The Pistol Preview 10 September 1965
- Lydia Sokolova Interview 13 September 1965
- Willy Brandt Preview 15 September 1965
- Douglas Bader 17 September 1965
- William Edward Taynton Talks About John Logie Baird 2 October 1965
- Tony Hancock Interview 5 October 1965
- A To Z-Cars 8 October 1965
- Hal Roach Interview / Julie Felix / Peter Ustinov 16 October 1965
- TV Review / Alan Bennett – Vicar Sketch / Tommy Makem and The Clancy Brothers 22 October 1965
- Arthur Askey 29 October 1965
- Line-Up Review 5 November 1965
- Maurice Denham / Kenneth Horne and Richard Murdoch 14 November 1965
- Juliette Gréco Interview 20 November 1965
- Peter Ustinov Interview 22 November 1965
- Diahann Carroll 26 November 1965
- George Orwell's 1984 – TV Adaptations 27 November 1965 – interviews by Michael Dean with Rudolph Cartier, Nigel Kneale, Peter Cushing, Yvonne Mitchell, Christopher Morahan, David Buck and Jane Merrow
- Dr Jacob Bronowski 2 December 1965
- A Child's Christmas in Wales 24 December 1965

=== 1966 ===
- Line Up Rugby / Yugoslav TV Film / Shirley Abicair 1 January 1966
- The Sea And Shipping 5 January 1966
- Line-Up Review – Comedy – What The Papers Say 7 January 1966
- War Films/ Bryan Forbes 11 January 1966
- Ivor Cutler / Clifford Davis Conjuring Tricks/TV Critics 13 January 1966
- Line -Up Review 14 January 1966
- Line Up Rugby/ Not Only But Also 15 January 1966
- Joseph Losey / Whole Scene Going 19 January 1966
- Plunder – A Portrait Of Gilbert Harding 23 January 1966
- Laurence Harvey 5 February 1966
- Softly, Softly / Richard Rodney Bennett 9 February 1966
- Ivor Mairants / Margaret Rutherford Interview / The Idiot 12 February 1966
- Burl Ives Interview 13 February 1966
- Sammy Gray Song / Arnold Ridley / Robert Harbin Trick/ Edmund Blunder 14 February 1966
- Line-Up Review 25 February 1966
- The Puffer 4 March 1966
- Barbra Streisand 17 March 1966
- Vikki Carr / The Man from U.N.C.L.E. – Interview With Robert Vaughn And David McCallum 21 March 1966
- Poetry / Sir Compton Mackenzie / Vintage Films 22 March 1966
- John Faulkner Song / Great Metropolis Review / Peter O'Donnell Interview/ Mary Martin Interview 9 April 1966
- Johnny and Fanny Cradock / James Robertson Justice / Tsai Chin Song 17 April 1966
- N. F. Simpson 28 April 1966
- Menuhin School – Yehudi Menuhin 1 May 1966
- André Previn Interview 4 May 1966
- N. F. Simpson Interview / Jimmy Edwards's Moustache / Breakfast TV / Donald Campbell Interview / Tonia Bern Interview 7 May 1966
- Sammy Davis Jr. Interview 14 May 1966
- Rolf Harris / Stanley Holloway / Jacques Loussier 23 May 1966
- Leopold Stokowski 21 June 1966
- Gay Hamilton / Leo McKern / Ivor Cutler 9 July 1966
- Cambria – Cargo Under Sail 12 July 1966
- Barbra Streisand 18 July 1966
- War Against Crime Discussion / Boris Karloff Films / Clive Turner Predictions 2 August 1966
- Alfred Hitchcock Interview 3 August 1966
- Future And Effect of Television – Discussion 4 August 1966
- From Madrid 5 August 1966
- Hans And Lotte Hass 7 September 1966
- Ken Russell At Work 23 September 1966
- America Since The Bomb 7 October 1966
- Tommy Trinder 11 October 1966
- Plunder 15 October 1966
- Coco the Clown 17 October 1966
- D. W. Griffith / Cambridge University Jazz Ensemble 27 October 1966
- Documentary Discussion 28 October 1966
- Ex-RSM Ronald Brittain Interview 30 October 1966
- Professor John Kenneth Galbraith 14 November 1966
- Royal Variety Performance 20 November 1966
- Discussion 21 November 1966
- Alan Bennett Interview / Georg Solti Interview 23 November 1966
- Dave Brubeck 1 December 1966
- Chay Blyth And John Ridgway on rowing the Atlantic / Marine Biology Discussion 2 December 1966
- Nancy Mitford on Louis XIV 5 December 1966
- U Thant on Human Rights Day 10 December 1966
- Propaganda Discussion / Billy Budd Opera Review 11 December 1966
- Francis Chichester / Henry Livings Interview 12 December 1966
- The Magic Roundabout / Philip Jenkinson Film Clips 13 December 1966
- Erik Durschmied Cameraman 14 December 1966
- Jack and the Beanstalk 22 December 1966

=== 1967 ===
- Dick Gregory 2 January 1967
- The Forsyte Saga 7 January 1967
- Eurovision Song Contest Discussion 21 January 1967
- John Hawkesworth on The Croxley Master January 1967
- Alan Melville Interview / Desert Island Discs 27 January 1967
- Discussion on building industry / Gladys Aylward 1 February 1967
- David Frost 4 February 1967
- David Merrick, Broadway Producer 7 February 1967
- Douglas Byng 13 February 1967
- Gwyneth Jones 15 February 1967
- Duke Ellington 19 February 1967
- Pick of the Month 3 March 1967
- The Pickwick Papers Extract / Robin Scott / Denis Touhy 9 March 1967
- Dame Edith Evans 20 March 1967
- George Browne, Trinidadian singer, sang "On the Road to Rainbow City" / Pierre Salinger / Children's Literature And Negroes 3 April 1967
- Little Angel Theatre 10 April 1967
- Westerns Discussion / Buddy Rich / Los Zafiros Group 20 April 1967
- Eric Porter / Shakespeare's Sonnets 22 April 1967
- The Golden Rose of Montreux 1967 28 April 1967
- Phil Silvers Interview 1/5/67
- James Cameron 4 May 1967
- Jimi Hendrix Experience / Psychedelic Happening – Discussion/ Pierre Schoendoerffer 17 May 1967
- Plunder – One Man And His Band (Harry Roy) 19 May 1967
- Julian Slade 21 May 1967
- Soldiers of the Widow 27 May 1967
- Sir Gerald Cock Interview 1 June 1967
- Gladys Cooper 11 June 1967
- Homosexuality Discussion 14 June 1967
- Manitas de Plata 15 June 1967
- John Earle & Boat 'Helen'/ Arthur Negus 22 June 1967
- 1000th Edition – Peter Cook And Dudley Moore / Terry Jones / Robert Morley / Nyree Dawn Porter / Ned Sherrin / David Attenborough / Marion Montgomery 30 June 1967
- A.P. Herbert Interview 3 July 1967
- The Forsyte Saga 4 July 1967
- Freddie Frinton / Mel Calman Cartoon on Sickness 10 July 1967
- Gibson Square 1 August 1967
- Battersea Park 10 August 1967
- Alistair Cooke 14 August 1967
- Electronics And TV / Rolling Stones / Discussion On Canadian Film Industry 24 August 1967
- Empty Quarter Clip/ Colin Davis Interview 25 August 1967
- Queen Mary II, Clyde steamer 26 September 1967
- Dick Van Dyke 4 October 1967
- Fred Friendly 26 October 1967
- Barry Humphries / Franco Zeffirelli / Mable Hillery 27 October 1967
- Philip Jenkinson Film Requests/ Edmund Leach 29 October 1967
- Disc Jockeys 21 November 1967
- L Marsland Gander Interview on Lord Reith / Like Father – 1/ Benjamin Britten / Like Father – 2 – Billy Cotton Snr and Bill Cotton Jnr 22 November 1967
- Visual Effects – Jack Kine 25 November 1967 (included on the DVD release of the Doctor Who serial The Tomb of the Cybermen)
- Mcgonagall poetry / Marion Montgomery / The Magic Roundabout /Philip Oakes On Petula Clark / Westerns In TV / East End Slums Discussion/ Michael Miles 3 December 1967
- Yoko Ono Press Release / Malcolm Muggeridge And Kitty Muggeridge / Alirio Díaz – Guitarist 4 December 1967
- Julie Felix Song / Dear Octopus Play / Black Dwarf Newspaper 7 December 1967
- Arthur Askey 14 December 1967
- Maurice Chevalier 31 December 1967

=== 1968 ===
- Tyrone Guthrie 15 January 1968
- Vera Lynn 21 January 1968
- V.S. Pritchett 26 January 1968
- Violet Bonham Carter (Lady Asquith) and Lady Stocks in Women's Suffrage 1 February 1968
- Seán O'Casey 6 February 1968
- Sir Arnold Lunn 11 February 1968
- Dame Edith Evans 17 February 1968
- Dame Marie Rambert 21 February 1968
- Royal Court / Cue magazine 29 February 1968
- Carlo Maria Giulini 3 March 1968
- Lotte Reiniger / girls from Hammersmith County School give their views on public schools 9 March 1968
- Graham Collier and Jazz 15 March 1968
- Peter Brook Interview 19 March 1968
- Kathleen Beehan Interview / Chaucer – The Canterbury Tales 20 March 1968
- George Bernard Shaw 22 March 1968
- Tim Buckley / Cicely Courtneidge And Jack Hulbert / Kingsley Martin Interview 1 April 1968
- Oliver Knussen / Cockneyland 8 April 1968
- Günter Grass Interview 11 April 1968
- Derek Jones 12 April 1968
- Bert Haanstra 16 April 1968
- Brighton Postcards 26 April 1968
- Xenia Field Interview 1 May 1968
- Cecil Beaton Interview 9 May 1968
- Colour Me Pop – Katch 22 17 May 1968 Transmitted 18 May 1968
- Alan Whicker 19 May 1968
- Skye 24 May 1968
- Robert Duncan Interview 27 May 1968
- Alfred Wallis 29 May 1968
- Bloomsbury Group 30 May 1968
- Andy Williams 31 May 1968
- Marcel Duchamp Interview 5 June 1968 – his only television interview
- Alger Hiss 10 June 1968
- Stephen Arlen On Sadler's Wells 17 June 1968
- Colour Me Pop – Small Faces 21 June 1968
- Robert Bly 24 June 1968
- Václav Havel 26 June 1968
- Douglas Cooper: art critic on Picasso's work for theatre 27 June 1968
- Bessie Love 29 June 1968
- Paris Students – Posters 1 July 1968
- Arthur Kopit 4 July 1968
- Bob Hope 13 July 1968
- Fun Fair 18 July 1968
- Robert Wise 20 July 1968
- Diaghilev 22 July 1968
- Lynne Reid Banks 25 July 1968
- Cybernetic Serendipity exhibition 1 August 1968
- Photography 3 August 1968
- Rod Steiger 10 August 1968
- Simone Signoret 12 August 1968
- Peter Terson 19 August 1968
- Peter Lawford 24 August 1968
- Sissinghurst Castle 26 August 1968
- Michael Macliammoir / Canterbury Tales – Musical 2 September 1968
- Gary Player 9 September 1968
- Elsie Randolph 11 September 1968
- Colour Me Pop – The Moody Blues 14 September 1968
- Boris Karloff 21 September 1968
- Genevieve Page 26 September 1968
- Alfred Hitchcock 27 September 1968
- Sandy Dennis 4 October 1968
- Quintin Hogg 7 October 1968
- Buddy Rich 9 October 1968
- Colour Me Pop – Honeybus – Clodagh Rodgers 12 October 1968
- Out in Arizona Where The Bad Men Are – The Making Of "The High Chaparral" 22 October 1968
- Tom Hayden 28 October 1968
- Jules Feiffer 31 October 1968
- Ramón Novarro Interview 1 November 1968
- Stuart Hood 5 November 1968
- Gloria Swanson Interview 7 November 1968
- Leif Erickson Interview/ First World War Posters 11 November 1968
- Lester Pearson 14 November 1968
- Eric Portman Interview 15 November 1968
- Vivien Merchant Interview 19 November 1968
- Rosemary Tonks and Maureen Duffy Two poets film. 20 November 1968
- Cameron Mitchell Interview 25 November 1968
- John Colicos and Kenneth Tynan on the Soldiers play 26 November 1968
- Benny Goodman Interview 4 December 1968
- Roland Topor Interview 5 December 1968
- The Young Visiters – Interview With Daisy Ashford 19 December 1968
- The Film World Past And Present – Brigitte Bardot Interview / Benny Goodman 20 December 1968
- Colour Me Pop – Bonzo Dog Doo-Dah Band 21 December 1968
- TV in the USA 22 December 1968

=== 1969 ===
- Colour Me Pop – The Move 4 January 1969
- Aaron Copland 10 January 1969
- Barbra Streisand 15 January 1969
- Film Night – Rosemary's Baby 19 January 1969
- George Plimpton 23 January 1969
- Don Partridge and The Buskers 29 January 1969
- Harold Pinter 3 February 1969
- J. P. Donleavy Interview 5 February 1969
- Georges Simenon Interview 9 February 1969
- The Forsyte Saga / Alan Randall / Philip Oakes On Tony Hancock 10 February 1969
- Sir Kenneth Clark 28 February 1969
- Sewell Stokes Interview On Isadora Duncan 4 March 1969
- Michael Balcon 11 March 1969
- John Hutton 18 March 1969
- Film Night – Vincent Price Interview/ 23 March 1969
- Film Night – Ice Station Zebra / Peter Finch 30 March 1969
- Adrian Conan Doyle Interview 8 April 1969
- Alvar Lidell 11 April 1969
- Richard Hamilton Interview 14 April 1969
- In Celebration At the Royal Court Theatre 22 April 1969
- Jack Valenti 1 May 1969
- Sir Compton Mackenzie 9 May 1969
- Hubert Humphrey 15 May 1969
- The Rector Of Stiffkey 20 May 1969
- Film Night – Dimitri Tiomkin 25 May 1969
- Dorset Horses 26 May 1969
- Viveca Lindfors 30 May 1969
- Sir Robert Mayer 4 June 1969
- The Promise 15 June 1969
- Film Night – The Illustrated Man 22 June 1969
- Alwin Nikolais 27 June 1969
- Film Night – The Great Pismo 29 June 1969
- Ronald Searle 2 July 1969
- Francis Hastings 3 July 1969
- Colour Me Pop – Trapeze 5 July 1969
- C.U.R.E. – Drugs 8 July 1969
- Film Night – Moon Zero Two 13 July 1969
- Film Night – Mervin Leroy 10 August 1969
- Frank Cousins 21 August 1969
- George Gershwin 22 August 1969
- Film Night – The White Game / Run of the Arrow 24 August 1969
- Jimmy Edwards Interview 29 August 1969
- I Am English I Was German But Above All I Was There 2 September 1969
- Lillian Gish 3 September 1969
- Tito Gobbi 4 September 1969
- Bhaktivedanta Swami and Krishna devotees 16 September 1969
- Ringo Starr 10 December 1969

=== 1970 ===
- When We Get To Calella It's Going To Be Great! 15 September 1970
- Beethoven Trio 22 September 1970
- Playgrounds 25 September 1970
- Nixon in Ireland 9 October 1970
- William Kunstler Interview 12 October 1970
- The Gang Show 19 October 1970
- Bessie Braddock 20 October 1970
- The Man Who Almost Won The National 29 October 1970
- Bessie Braddock Obituary 13 November 1970
- Laurence Olivier Interview 16 November 1970
- Jeanne Moreau Talks About Orson Welles 19 November 1970
- Gypsies 25 November 1970
- John Breslin On Homosexuality 4 December 1970
- Lenny Bruce Stand Up Routine 18 December 1970
- Colin Welland 21 December 1970
- Monty Python's Flying Circus 22 December 1970
- Richard Huggett 23 December 1970
- Laughter in Despair – Loot 30 December 1970

=== 1971 ===
- One Man's Week – Russell Braddon 13 February 1971
- Guinness Factory Workers Give Opinion About The Quality And Content of TV Programmes 19 February 1971
- One Man's Week – John Peel 20 February 1971
- Galia von Meck 24 February 1971
- Underground Soviet Magazines / The Music Lovers / Tambimuttu 26 February 1971
- One Man's Week – Godfrey Winn 27 February 1971
- One Man's Week – Gwyn Thomas 6 March 1971
- Harold Lloyd Interview / BBC Bias / James Brown Interview 12 March 1971
- Croagh Patrick Pilgrimage – The Reek 17 March 1971
- One Man's Week – P. J. Kavanagh 27 March 1971
- One Man's Week – Lord Chalfont 3 April 1971
- Anthony Hopkins Interview 6 April 1971
- One Man's Week – Richard Ingrams 10 April 1971
- Jimmy Wheeler 12 April 1971
- One Man's Week – Humphrey Lyttelton 17 April 1971
- The Future of Television – Debate 20 April 1971
- Television – An Assessment 21 April 1971
- Television – The Future – Cannes Exhibition 23 April 1971
- One Man's Week – J. B. Priestley 24 April 1971
- Hitler – A Fateful Friendship 30 April 1971
- One Man's Week – Barry Took 1 May 1971
- One Man's Week – Michael Foot 8 May 1971
- One Man's Week – Maurice Levinson 15 May 1971
- One Man's Week – Kenny Everett 29 May 1971
- Fred Ball 31 May 1971
- One Man's Week – John Aspinall 12 June 1971
- One Woman's Week – Cleo Laine 19 June 1971
- Colonel Otto Skorzeny Interview 26 July 1971
- We Have Met The Enemy And He Is Us 27 July 1971
- Discussion On Oswald Mosley 28 July 1971
- Museum Discussion 17 August 1971
- The People Plague 18 August 1971
- Daniel Ellsberg 2 September 1971
- Scottish Television 3 September 1971
- Lotte Lehmann 16 September 1971
- Professor Paul Ehrlich 24 September 1971
- Dennis Potter interviewed about Traitor 14 October 1971
- Ecology 20 October 1971
- A 4th TV Channel – Discussion 22 October 1971
- Martin Gilbert 25 October 1971
- Fishing 5 November 1971
- Civilia 22 November 1971
- Dance Bands 13 December 1971

=== 1972 ===
- Dutch Television 14 January 1972
- Up Sunday 16 January 1972
- James Moffatt Interview 21 January 1972
- Up Sunday 23 January 1972
- Discussion On Edward Albee 7 February 1972
- International Guitar Competition 23 February 1972
- Malcolm Macdonald 15 March 1972
- Up Sunday – Animation 26 March 1972
- Women's Edition of Punch – Discussion 27 March 1972
- Up Sunday – Events of the Week 9 April 1972
- The Comedians with Charlie Williams, Bernard Manning, Ken Goodwin and John Hamp – Discussion 12 April 1972
- Everybody Likes Little Bit Xtr 14 April 1972
- Ecology – The Club of Rome 17 April 1972
- Hetty King 19 April 1972
- Welcome Little Kangaroo – Eight Years of BBC2 21 April 1972
- Up Sunday 23 April 1972
- Steven Scheuer Interview 5 May 1972
- Up Sunday – Events of the Week 7 May 1972
- Sculpture 8 May 1972
- James Joyce 11 May 1972
- Harold Evans Interview 17 May 1972
- Working men's clubs 24 May 1972
- Up Sunday 4 June 1972
- Ecology – So Far So Good 12 June 1972
- World Ecology Conference 16 June 1972
- An Element in This Country Which I Need 12 July 1972
- General Võ Nguyên Giáp Interview 28 July 1972
- Lady Betjeman 1 August 1972
- All Our Own Work 2 August 1972
- Little Richard Interview / Francis Fuchs Interview 4 August 1972
- Cable Vision 9 August 1972
- Claud Cockburn Interview 15 August 1972
- Robert Maxwell Interview 22 August 1972
- Bill Tidy Interview – The Fosdyke Saga 11 September 1972
- A Profile of Johnny Speight 15 September 1972
- Pornography, Sex And Freedom 29 September 1972
- John Houston 9 October 1972
- Sir Hugh Carleton Greene – Granada Lecture 18 October 1972
- Vietnam Veterans 19 October 1972
- Cecil Arthur Lewis 6 November 1972
- Wole Soyinka Interview 20 November 1972
- World Speed Trials 23 November 1972
- Black September 7 December 1972
- Press Photography 13 December 1972
- Last Edition (of original run) – BBC2 Discussion With Michael Dean, Tony Bilbow, Sheridan Morley And David Attenborough 14 December 1972

=== 1986 ===
- Revived for a week to celebrate BBC TV's 50th Anniversary, with Michael Dean, Tony Bilbow, Joan Bakewell and Sheridan Morley.

=== 2008 ===
- Permissive Night 26 May 2008 – BBC Parliament discussion of 1960s liberalising legislation with Margaret Drabble, Peter Hitchens, Michael Howard MP and Lord Robert Winston. This edition came from Studio MB1 at the BBC’s Westminster Studios
