= Aubrey Singer =

British broadcasting executive and producer

Aubrey Edward Singer CBE (21 January 1927 – 26 May 2007) was a British broadcasting executive who spent most of his career at the BBC. He has been described as "the greatest director general that the BBC never had".

Singer was born in Bradford, England, left school aged 17 to train as a film editor, and joined the BBC in 1949. He was head of the Features Group which included Science & Features, Arts Features, and General Features. This group largely made documentary programmes. Singer took the lead in finding international funding for very ambitious co-productions, leading to the so-called 'Science Spectaculars' written by Nigel Calder, and then the 13-part "personal view" series such as Civilisation (1969) and The Ascent of Man (1973). He was also largely responsible for the historic 1967 Our World global satellite broadcast, which featured The Beatles.

Singer was the controller of BBC2 from 1974 until 1978, who replaced Robin Scott and was replaced himself by Brian Wenham. He spoke to the Oxford University Broadcasting Society in 1975.

From 1978 Singer was managing director of BBC Radio and from 1982 he was managing director of BBC Television. He was appointed a CBE in 1984. After early retirement from the BBC, he established White City Films where he was managing director until 1996.

Singer married Cynthia Adams in 1949 and they had two children.

Media offices
| Preceded by Robin Scott | Controller of BBC2; 1974–1978 | Succeeded by Brian Wenham |
