= O'Hara's Playboys =

Scottish pop band

- Also known as: John O'Hara and His Playboys; John O'Hara and His New Playboys; John O'Hara and The Playboys
- Origin: Glasgow, Scotland
- Genres: Pop
- Years active: 1958–1970s
- Past members: John O'Hara; Ralph Danks; Davy McHarg; Bill Mathieson; John McCall; Les Connell; Sandy McFarlane; Billy Simpson; Jimmy McLachlan; Pete Campbell; Pete Green; Johnny Wiggins; Dennis Overton; George Carmichael; Bobby Campbell

John O'Hara and His Playboys (or O'Hara's Playboys) was a British pop group formed in Glasgow, Scotland. They relocated to England in the mid 1960s and were a popular live act in Germany.

== History ==
The band originally formed as The Ralph Danks Playboys in 1958 with Ralph Danks (vocals), Bill Mathieson (bass), John O'Hara (saxophone), and Davy McHarg (drums). After a tour of Germany in 1961, Danks left the band to stay in Germany. The band had a successful career in Germany between 1962 and 1966. They toured widely in Germany, headlining at the Star Club in Hamburg several times, and sang with Barbara Murphy.

By 1962, they were led by Big John McCall, but in 1963, he and guitarists Les Connell and Sandy McFarlane were injured in a car crash while in Germany and left the band, so saxophonist John O'Hara had moved to lead vocals and the band became "John O'Hara and His/The Playboys".

In December 1964, guitarist Jimmy McLachlan left and was replaced by Liverpool-born Pete Campbell, and saxophonist Dennis Overton left to return home for his mothers funeral and replaced by George Carmichael; Overton later rejoined when Carmichael left due to musical differences. Guitarist Billy Simpson left in 1966, and Bobby Campbell joined on guitar and keyboard; Overton left for a second time and around this time, the bands named became just "O'Hara's Playboys".

Also in 1966, the band moved to England, and shared flats in Sheffield and London. During their time in England in the 1960s, they toured with The Who, Tom Jones, Englebert Humperdinck, Little Richard, The Platters and Joe Cocker, and backed Mary Wells.

They were the first band to be given both halves of an episode of Colour Me Pop being filmed live in Sheffield for the first half of the programme and then recording the second half at the BBC, on 5 October 1968. From December 1968 to January 1969, they toured Beirut, and throughout 1969, performed in Saint-Tropez in May, The Bahamas in July and August, and Germany again in October.

After the band's return to UK they supported various major American bands in concert and 1968-69 made eight TV appearances on ITV, Scottish Television, Teilifís Éireann, BBC1 and BBC2 including the Golden Shot. Saxophonist Pete Green left in 1969 and Simpson rejoined in place of Bobby Campbell.

== Members ==
- John O'Hara (lead vocals) sang until the 1980s, during which he sang with the British band The Californians, and worked in pubs and clubs until he retired in the 2000s/2010s.
- Bill Mathieson (bass) left in 1969 and worked as an engineer.
- Les Connel (guitar) and Big John McCall (lead vocals) worked together in Germany; McCall died in 2011.
- Jimmy McLachlan (guitar) still played guitar until 2009.
- Billy Simpson (guitar) worked as a truck driver in Carlisle.
- Mathieson claimed in 2011 that he believes guitarist Sandy McFarlane "passed away some years back".
- Pete Campbell (guitar) runs a taxi business in London.
- George Carmichael (saxophone) worked in pit orchestras for various orchestra during the 1970s.
- Bobby Campbell (guitar) stayed in Sheffield and played in many more bands and then went solo before retiring from music in the mid-1970s.
- Johnny Wiggins (saxophone) ran a club in Spain and married Sylvia Saunders, drummer for The Liverbirds.
- Pete Green (saxophone) worked as a businessman in Sheffield and London.

== O'Hara's Playboys discography ==
=== Albums ===
Year	Month	Label	Title
1968	July	Fontana	Get Ready

=== UK singles ===
Year	Month	Label	A-side	B-side
1966	28 October	Fontana	"Start all over"	"I've Been Wondering"
1967	24 February	Fontana	"Spicks and Specks"	"One Fine Lady"
1967	September	Fontana	"Ballad of the Soon Departed"	"Tell Me Why"
1967	15 December	Fontana	"Island in the Sun"	"Harry"
1968	19 April	Fontana	"In the Shelter of Your Heart"	"Goodnight Mr. Nightfall"
1968	12 July	Fontana	"Voices"	"Blue Dog"
1968	4 October	Fontana	"I Started A Joke"	"Show Me"

=== German singles ===
Year	Month	Label	A-side	B-side
1964	June	Decca Germany	"Louie Louie"	"Stampfkartoffeln Tä-Tä-Rä"
1964	June	Decca Germany	"Das War Gestern"	"Ein Zwei Drei"
1965	March	Decca Germany	"Doo Wah Diddy Diddy"	"Mr Moonlight"

=== Extended play ===
Year	Month	Label	Title	Tracks
1964	Decca	July	"Mashed-Potatoes-Medley"	1. "Mashed Potatoes"; 2. "Es gibt kein Bier auf Hawaii"; 3. "Mashed Potatoes"; 4. "Das Humbta, Humpta-Täterä"; 5. "Mashed Potatoes"; 6. "Skinny Minnie"

== John O'Hara solo discography ==
=== Albums ===
Year	Month	Label	Title
1977	?	Look	Both Sides

=== Singles ===
Year	Month	Label	A-side	B-side
1977	3 July	President	"Starsky And Hutch"	"Sister Rae"
