= Michael Dean (broadcaster) =

New Zealand television presenter

- Born: 15 May 1933; Palmerston North, New Zealand
- Died: 5 October 2015 (aged 82)
- Occupation: Television presenter
- Years active: 1960s–1980s
- Television: Late Night Line-Up; Man Alive; 40 Minutes

Michael Dean (15 May 1933 – 5 October 2015) was a New Zealand-born television broadcaster from the 1960s to the 1980s, best known for his work for the BBC in the United Kingdom, but who worked in his native New Zealand and in Australia.

== Biography ==
Born in Palmerston North in 1933, Dean was the son of Mavis Eileen Dean (née Mason) and her husband, general practitioner Kenrick Holt Dean, a grandson of Robert Holt. He was educated at Palmerston North Boys' High School and joined the local newspaper as a cadet journalist. Aged 20, he became ill with tuberculosis and spent a period in a sanatorium. He spent a year in South Africa as a newspaper sports reporter in Cape Town, before returning to New Zealand to work for the New Zealand Broadcasting Service.

After a period in Sydney, Dean moved to the United Kingdom and was a presenter for eight years on the BBC2 discussion programme Late Night Line-Up. During the early 1970s he made television documentaries on such figures as George Formby, Noël Coward and the Duke and Duchess of Windsor.

Following the cancellation of Late Night Line-Up in 1972, Dean returned to New Zealand where he hosted the eponymous television chat show Dean on Sunday, before once again moving to Australia where he worked for the Nine Network and anchored that broadcaster's 1976 Summer Olympics coverage. Subsequently, he returned to the BBC in Britain and was a reporter on programmes such as Man Alive and 40 Minutes.

In 1968, Dean married Christine Collins, an actress, and they had two children, Rachel and Emily. In 2019, Emily published her memoir, Everybody Died, So I Got a Dog, detailing her childhood experiences including her strained relationship with her father following his leaving the family and the deaths of her sister, father and mother.

In later life, Dean was afflicted by dementia. He died on 5 October 2015. His ex-wife Christine had died months earlier in February 2015; while his daughter Rachel had died of cancer in 2012. He was survived by his daughter Emily and two grandchildren through his daughter Rachel.
