= Community Programme Unit =

BBC unit helping the public make programmes

The Community Programme Unit was established by the BBC to help members of the public create programmes to be broadcast nationally.

The unit was established in 1972 by producers such as Rowan Ayers having won the approval of the Director of Programmes David Attenborough for a series of ten programmes called Open Door for BBC 2. The first programme was broadcast on 2 April 1973.

Open Door evolved into Open Space which by the end of the 1980s was receiving up to twenty proposals from the public for programmes every week. These proposals were evaluated by the CPU's staff three or four times a year and a shortlist of six to eight potential programmes to fill the next series was drawn up. The programmes would usually highlight a group or point of view that was under-represented or misrepresented in British broadcasting,

With the increased availability and quality of domestic video equipment the CPU began to compile and broadcast a series of Video Diaries which in turn evolved into Video Nation.

The Community Programme Unit suffered from budget cuts at the BBC and had been disbanded by 2004.
