= Open Space (TV programme) =

British documentary series

- Genre: Documentary
- Country of origin: United Kingdom
- Original language: English
- No. of seasons: 24
- No. of episodes: 302

Production
- Running time: 26-89 minutes
- Production companies: Community Programme Unit; BBC Two
- Budget: £25,000

Original release
- Network: BBC
- Release: 5 July 1983 – 5 May 1995

Open Space is a programme produced by the BBC's Community Programme Unit. It was an evolution of the earlier Open Door series of programmes allowing minority points of view to make a television programme about issues of concern to them. The programmes were transmitted on BBC2 in a mid-evening slot, usually 8 pm, and would attract audiences between 500,000 and 1,500,000.

In a typical year there would be two or three groups of up to eight Open Space programmes each usually half an hour long. A producer, an assistant, and in 1990 a budget of up to £25,000, would be allocated to each programme.

== Format ==
Each episode of Open Space was created by members of the public, who were given access to professional production resources and guidance from BBC staff. This collaborative process resulted in a diverse range of programmes covering a wide array of subjects, from environmental concerns and social justice issues to local community projects and international affairs. The format of Open Space was groundbreaking in its commitment to democratising media production, empowering individuals and groups to tell their own stories in their own words.

== Impact and legacy ==
Open Space is remembered for its contribution to public service broadcasting and its role in challenging the conventions of television production. By providing a platform for underrepresented perspectives, the series not only enriched the public discourse but also anticipated the rise of user-generated content in the digital age. Its innovative approach has been recognised as a precursor to later participatory media initiatives and has inspired similar formats in other countries.

The programme's legacy continues to be felt in the ways it broadened the scope of topics covered by the mainstream media and in its demonstration of the potential for collaborative media production to foster greater inclusivity and diversity in broadcasting.

== Reception ==
Open Space was received positively by audiences and critics alike for its fresh and inclusive approach to television production. Viewers appreciated the opportunity to see programmes that reflected their own experiences and concerns, while critics lauded the series for its commitment to public service values and its role in pioneering new forms of participatory media.

Despite its eventual conclusion in the early 1990s, Open Space remains a noteworthy experiment in public broadcasting, and its influence can be seen in various participatory and community-based media projects that have emerged in the years since.

== See also ==
- Open Door (TV programme)
- Public broadcasting
- Participatory media
- Community media
