= Philip Jenkinson =

British film critic (1935–2012)

- Born: 17 August 1935; Sale, Cheshire, England
- Died: 11 March 2012 (aged 76)
- Occupation(s): Journalist, television presenter, film collector
- Spouse: Sally Jay

Philip Jenkinson (17 August 1935 – 11 March 2012) was an English cinema specialist, journalist, BBC television presenter, and film collector. His collection was known as Filmfinders. During the 1970s, Jenkinson contributed a weekly column for the television listings magazine Radio Times and edited films for the BBC Two music show The Old Grey Whistle Test.

== Early life ==
Jenkinson was born in Sale. When he was a child he won a holiday talent contest by performing George Formby imitations at a Butlins holiday camp. A talent scout noticed him and arranged an audition with BBC Children's Hour. That incident led to much radio work from Leeds. His parents were not interested at all. The money he earned he spent on elocution lessons to get rid of his Manchester accent. In those days no successful actor would have a regional accent.

He had severe asthma as a child and consequently missed much school, so the milkman gave his mother a 9.5mm projector to keep him amused, and by that means he started watching films. His mother used to give him money to go swimming to build up his strength, but he spent it at the cinema instead. His mother disapproved, believing he'd pick up too many germs, but he would put his swimming trunks under the tap before returning home so that she would not discover the deception.

When he left school he started work as a projectionist, then worked in the theatre, in stage management and acting. At one theatre he met the set designer Sally Jay, later his wife. The couple decided to move to London where they gained work with the distributors Contemporary Films.

== Career ==
Philip Jenkinson said in a 2003 interview: "One day when I was giving a lecture at St Martin's School of Art, a BBC producer, Mike Appleton, was waiting at the back to pick up his girlfriend and he caught the last 10 minutes. He came over and said it was very interesting. 'I am a producer of a programme called Late Night Line-Up. Would you like to come along and do something similar on the programme?' They liked it and asked me to come back next week and do another one. I initially signed a contract for six months, which grew and grew. I ended up staying with Late Night Line Up for five years. The talk and emphasis was always about old movies. Film Night came out of Late Night Line Up. It started with me and Tony Bilbow. Tony reviewed the new films whilst I related the new films to ones that were made earlier, linking them with either a director or a star or the style; something they had in common." He was later asked by Late Night Live producer Rowan Ayers to help him launch The Beatles Abbey Road album.

During the 1970s, Jenkinson also contributed a weekly column for the television listings magazine Radio Times and edited films for music show The Old Grey Whistle Test. He was frantically busy during that period. He received up to 50 letters a week asking him to show certain film clips and was satirised by Monty Python in their sketch "Sam Peckinpah's "Salad Days"". During the sketch, a series of superimposed captions read "Philip Jenkinson again," "Get on with it," "And stop sniffing," and "Will you stop sniffing." At the end, a caption reading "Tee hee" is displayed as he is machine-gunned to death.

In 1971 he started a series of 13 weekly lectures at London's National Film Theatre on the history of the musical. . At this time Jenkinson started building up Filmfinders, as a stock shot library as opposed to being a personal collection. He acquired many Mack Sennett and Laurel and Hardy films from other collectors. It was a group which included Leslie Halliwell (who wrote The Filmgoers' Companion), author William K. Everson, Kevin Brownlow (authority on silent cinema), John Huntley (then at the British Film Institute) and a couple of friends in Hollywood. Bilbow and Jenkinson were dropped in 1975 by the BBC, who had been lobbied by the film industry for a less critical approach. Jenkinson would later go on to serve on the Board of Governors of the British Film Institute.

Jenkinson appeared as a guest on the Morecambe and Wise Christmas Show in 1977.

== Personal life ==
His wife Sally Jay, the sister of Sir Antony Jay, pre-deceased him. The couple had two sons, Lee William Jenkinson, who played bass guitar for Soft Cell singer Marc Almond, and Ben Jenkinson.
