= Brian Wenham =

Brian George Wenham (9 February 1937 – 8 May 1997) was the controller of BBC2 from 1978 until 1982. He was known for having nurtured Not the Nine O'Clock News, and coverage of snooker and opera.

He had been a senior producer for ITN on News at Ten in the 1960s, moving to the BBC at the age of 32 to become the editor of Panorama in 1969.

== Notes ==
Media offices
Preceded by Aubrey Singer	Controller of BBC2; 1978-1982	Succeeded by Graeme MacDonald
