= Video Diaries =

British television series

Video Diaries is a BBC television programme produced by the Community Programme Unit. The series of programmes was created in 1990 by producer Jeremy Gibson. The programme's production team offered members of the public basic video training and ongoing support. The diarist was then left to gather their material with a camcorder. They would then have further support in editing and post-production.
