= Video Nation =

BBC television project in social anthropology and audience interactivity

Video Nation is a BBC television project in social anthropology and audience interactivity, which ended in 2011.

== History ==
Beginning in 1993, the BBC encouraged people to record their lives on video. These video diaries were then shown on BBC TV and, from 2001 to 2011, were included on the BBC's website.

The original project was created by the Community Programme Unit with output intended for broadcast on BBC Two. Jeremy Gibson and Tony Steyger developed the original concept with Steyger drawing inspiration from the Mass-Observation Archive to propose 'an anthropology of everyday life.' The project was co-produced between 1993 and 2001 by Chris Mohr and Mandy Rose. A diverse group of fifty people were selected from across the UK, given training in the use of camcorders and invited to record aspects of everyday life during the course of a year. From their recordings the team drew material for a range of programmes, of which the best known are the Shorts which were broadcast before BBC Two's Newsnight current affairs programme. Contributors had a right of veto over their material so that nothing was broadcast without their consent. BBC Two de-commissioned the television series in 2000 at which point a website was built from the existing archive. Hundreds of contributors then went on to make shorts for the site, and Video Nation has returned to BBC TV screens during thematic seasons.

On 24 January 2011, the BBC announced that they would be making cuts of 25% to the online budget resulting in a shortfall of £34 million from the budget. As part of this, many websites and services were closed, to achieve a "smaller fitter BBC". Video Nation was part of this category.

== See also ==
- Channel 4 – FourDocs
