= The Old Grey Whistle Test =

British music television programme

- One of 1970s opening titles
- Also known as: Whistle Test (1983–1988)
- Created by: Rowan Ayers; Mike Appleton
- Presented by: Richard Williams; Ian Whitcomb; Bob Harris; Annie Nightingale; Andy Kershaw; David Hepworth; Mark Ellen; Richard Skinner; Ro Newton
- Opening theme: "Stone Fox Chase" – Area Code 615 (1971–1983)
- Country of origin: United Kingdom
- Original language: English

Production
- Producer: Mike Appleton
- Running time: 40–60 minutes
- Production company: BBC Television

Original release
- Network: BBC2
- Release: 21 September 1971 – 1 January 1988
- Network: BBC Four
- Release: 23 February 2018

The Old Grey Whistle Test (sometimes abbreviated to Whistle Test or OGWT) is a British television music series broadcast by the BBC. It was devised by producer Rowan Ayers, commissioned by David Attenborough, and aired on BBC2 from 1971 to 1988. It took over the late-night slot from Disco 2, which ran between September 1970 and July 1971 inclusive, while continuing to feature non-chart music. The original producer, involved in an executive capacity throughout the show's entire history, was Michael Appleton.

On 23 February 2018, a one-off live three-hour special of The Old Grey Whistle Test was broadcast on BBC Four, hosted by Bob Harris to mark 30 years since the final episode had been broadcast.

== History ==
Launched on BBC2, the series focused on albums, rather than chart hits covered on BBC1 by Top of the Pops. According to presenter Bob Harris, it derived its name from a Tin Pan Alley phrase from years before. When they got the first pressing of a record they would play it to people they called "the old greys" – doormen in grey suits. Any song the doormen could remember and whistle, having heard it just once or twice, had passed the old grey whistle test.

The series was originally produced in a studio at BBC Television Centre in west London known as "Pres B", which had been originally designed for shooting weather forecasts and in-vision continuity. The studio was only 32 by 22 feet (10 m × 7 m). Due to the lack of technology that accommodated live performances, bands mimed to tracks in early episodes.

The original intro for The Old Grey Whistle Test (1971) featured a naked woman painted entirely in green dancing to the Santana track "Jingo". This visual sequence was used during the show's first season, when it was presented by rock journalist Richard Williams. The series' opening titles theme changed to an animation of a male figure made up of stars (known as the 'Star Kicker') dancing, when Bob Harris took over as the presenter. The programme's title music, with its harmonica theme, was a track called Stone Fox Chase by a Nashville band, Area Code 615.

The first host was Richard Williams, features editor of the music weekly Melody Maker. From 1972 the programme was presented by disc jockey Bob Harris (nicknamed ‘Whispering Bob Harris’ because of his quiet voice and laid-back style). He later became notorious among the younger generation for distancing himself on air from Roxy Music's first performance on the show and calling the New York Dolls "mock rock".

In the programme's early days, before the advent of the music video, tracks that could not be performed live by musicians were accompanied by old film footage, edited especially for the programme by film collector and archivist Philip Jenkinson.

Harris left OGWT in 1979 and Annie Nightingale took over as host. In December 1980 Nightingale presented a special edition immediately after the murder of John Lennon (who had appeared on the show in 1975). This particular episode consisted almost entirely of interviews with various people about Lennon's life and career.

Following the departure of Nightingale in 1982, Mark Ellen and David Hepworth were the regular presenters. For the series beginning in January 1984 the title was abridged to Whistle Test, with a new logo and set design. Hepworth and Ellen were also later joined as presenters by Richard Skinner and Andy Kershaw. The same four presenters co-presented the BBC's television coverage of Live Aid in 1985. Ro Newton joined as a presenter in October 1985.

The series was cancelled in early 1987 by Janet Street-Porter, who had been appointed head of youth programmes at the BBC. It ended with a live New Year's Eve special, hosted by Bob Harris, broadcast through to the early hours of New Year's Day 1988: material included "Hotel California" by Eagles, live from 1977, and "Bat Out of Hell" by Meat Loaf.

Owing to technical issues during the show's early years and the need to ensure performances were controlled, the bands often recorded the instrumental tracks the day before. The vocals were then performed live "99 percent" of the time. After 1973 the show changed to an entirely live format.

=== 30th anniversary ===
On 23 February 2018 the BBC broadcast a special programme, hosted by Bob Harris, to mark 30 years since the series was last broadcast. This live studio show featured music, special guests and rare archive footage. It featured live performances from Gary Numan, Kiki Dee, Peter Frampton, Wildwood Kin, Richard Thompson, Albert Lee and Robert Vincent.

Harris interviewed Whistle Test alumni including Gary Numan, Dave Stewart, Joan Armatrading, Ian Anderson, Toyah Willcox, Dennis Locorriere, Chris Difford and Kiki Dee, as well as fan Danny Baker. Numan's performances on the show caused his latest album, Savage (Songs from a Broken World), to re-enter the charts the following week at number 60.

== See also ==
- Top Gear, a 1964–1975 BBC radio programme that focused on progressive music.
- The Midnight Special, a 1972–1981 US television series of a similar format from the same time period.
- Sounds of the 70s, a 1970s late night BBC radio programme which concentrated on albums rather than singles, and rock rather than pop.
- Top of the Pops, a British music chart television programme, made by the BBC and originally broadcast weekly from 1 January 1964 to 30 July 2006.
- Later... with Jools Holland, a BBC television series with a similar format that has been broadcast since 1992
