= Gullivers People =

Gullivers People were a London-based pop group that had some radio success and were produced and recorded by Norman 'Hurricane' Smith at Abbey Road Studios in London.
