= Peter Seabrook =

British gardener and broadcaster (1935–2022)

Peter Seabrook MBE
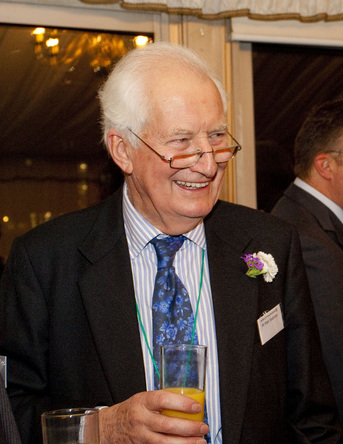
- Seabrook in 2011
- Born: 2 November 1935; Chelmsford, Essex, UK
- Died: 14 January 2022 (aged 86); Chelmsford, Essex, UK
- Occupations: Gardening writer, television broadcaster

Peter John Seabrook MBE (2 November 1935 – 14 January 2022) was a British gardening writer and television broadcaster, presenting programmes including the BBC's Gardeners' World. He wrote a gardening column in The Sun newspaper for over 40 years. He was appointed an MBE in 2005.

== Early life ==
Seabrook was born in Chelmsford, Essex, on 2 November 1935, as the son of a farmer. He grew up in Galleywood, near Chelmsford. With the help of international contacts, he started work in the horticultural industry aged 10, taking up full-time employment by 16. He paid for a nursery tour of the Netherlands with money raised selling sweet peas from his back garden to a local florist. He attended King Edward VI Grammar School, Chelmsford.

== Training and career ==
After working for two years on seed trial grounds, Seabrook studied horticulture at Writtle College in Essex, earning a diploma in 1956. During his national service, the British Army paid for his florist training. He became a director of seed and garden company Cramphorn, then a technical representative of Bord na Mona (Irish Peat Board) and finally a consultant and director of two garden centres.

Seabrook's broadcasting career began in 1965 on radio, with the BBC Home Service's In Your Garden and Gardeners' Question Time. On BBC television, beginning in 1975, he presented programmes including Gardeners' World, Pebble Mill at One and the Chelsea Flower Show. From 1977 until his death he was the gardening editor of The Sun. In America he hosted segments of The Victory Garden on PBS for over 20 years.

== Personal life and death ==
For 60 years Seabrook was married to Margaret, with whom he had two children. In 2020, she died of COVID-19 after living with dementia for nine years. He created in her honour the flower Margaret's Memory, a pale pink verbena, and donated the proceeds to Alzheimer's Research UK. He died of a heart attack at his home in Chelmsford on 14 January 2022, at the age of 86. He was gardening, campaigning and writing columns until the end; he had visited RHS Hyde Hall and W. D. Smith's Nurseries the day before he died.

== Honours ==
Seabrook was appointed an MBE in 2005. and he was the only person in the UK to hold the top three RHS awards for services to horticulture: the Victoria Medal of Honour (2003), the RHS Associate of Honour (1996) and the Harlow Carr Medal.
