= Rowan Ayers =

British television producer and executive

Rowan Ayers (16 June 1922 – 5 January 2008) was a British television producer and executive. He was best known as producer of BBC's Line-Up and Late Night Line-Up in the 1960s. He was the originator of BBCs influential late night rock music show The Old Grey Whistle Test and the long-running Points of View. He was also responsible for the BBC's Open Door. Born in Essex and educated at Dulwich College, Ayers served in the Royal Navy in the Second World War, reaching the rank of lieutenant and serving in the Battle of the Atlantic, and began his career as a journalist on Fleet Street as the television editor for Radio Times before moving to television. After several years with the BBC, where he had served as assistant head of presentation and run the BBC community programmes unit, in 1974 he moved to Australia where he joined the national Channel 9 network.

Ayers launched Abbey Road, the Beatles' last recorded album, on his show Late Night Line-Up to rapturous applause in late 1969. He was the father of Kevin Ayers, a founder member of Soft Machine, and a very keen Merlin Rocket sailor in the 1960s.

== Publications include ==
- Aspects in Adolescence. Being the moods of a young man London, A. H. Stockwell (1940) Poetry
- Australian Film, Television & Radio School Guide to Video Production (Allen & Unwin (Jun 1990) – 272 Pages – ISBN 0-04-442165-6)
- Guide to Video Production Allen & Unwin (Feb 1992) – 280 Pages – ISBN 0-642-16895-4)
