= Robin Scott (broadcasting executive) =

Robin Hugh Scutt CBE (24 October 1920 – 7 February 2000), better known as Robin Scott, was a British broadcasting executive. He was the launch controller of BBC Radio 1 and BBC Radio 2 in 1967, and the controller of BBC2 television from 1969 to 1974.

== Early career ==
Born Robin Hugh Scutt, he was educated at Bryanston School and read modern languages at Jesus College, Cambridge, before joining the Intelligence Corps. He was discharged through illness in 1942, and joined the BBC. While in the BBC's French Service he commented on major events, including VE Day and VJ Day. During this time he changed his name to Scott, because his French contacts found his original name difficult to say. He moved into television in the late 1950s, and produced programmes including Miss World, Come Dancing and It's a Knockout. During this time he wrote the song "Softly, Softly", a British number one hit for Ruby Murray. Scott moved to the BBC Paris bureau in 1958, and was seconded to Trans-Europe Television between 1964 and 1966.

== Controller of Radio ==
He was appointed Controller of the Light Programme in March 1967, and devised a format for the corporation's new popular music station. His vision deliberately echoed the pirate radio broadcasters that would be outlawed by the Marine Broadcast Offences Act in August 1967. The new pop station, BBC Radio 1, launched on 30 September 1967, with a signature tune commissioned by Scott, Theme One, recorded by George Martin. He was also Controller of BBC Radio 2, the successor to the Light Programme.

He was succeeded as Controller of Radio 2 and Radio 1 by Douglas Muggeridge.

== Controller of BBC2 ==
Scott was appointed Controller of BBC2 television in 1968, succeeding David Attenborough. During his five years in the post, his aim was to secure 15% of the overall viewing audience by balancing highbrow and populist programming. To achieve this aim, he commissioned such memorable programmes as Elizabeth R, The Pallisers, an adaptation of War and Peace, and documentary series including Alistair Cooke's America and Dr. Jacob Bronowski's The Ascent of Man.

== Later career ==
In 1974, Scott was made the head of the forward-planning department Development in Television, a remit that included the prospect of satellite broadcasting. He later became the Deputy Managing Director of Television, the second-most senior post in television.

After he retired from the BBC in October 1980, he was part of an unsuccessful submission to broadcast breakfast television on ITV. He subsequently joined the board of London Weekend Television, and produced television versions of opera and ballet productions for the National Video Corporation.

He was appointed CBE in 1976.

== Sources ==
- The Guardian newspaper, 9 February 2000, p22
- Radio Rewind
- The Times newspaper, 9 February 2000, p23
