= BBC Two =

Television channel operated by the BBC

- Logo used since 2021
- Country: United Kingdom
- Broadcast area: United Kingdom, Isle of Man, and Channel Islands, reaching bordering regions via overspill of the British terrestrial network
- Network: BBC Television
- Headquarters: Broadcasting House, London, England

Programming
- Language: English
- Picture format: 1080i/1080p (Note: 1080p25 sometimes on Freeview only) HDTV; (downscaled to 576i for the SDTV feed)

Ownership
- Owner: BBC
- Sister channels: BBC One; BBC Three; BBC Four; BBC News; BBC Parliament; CBBC; CBeebies; BBC Scotland; BBC Alba

History
- Launched: 21 April 1964; 62 years ago
- Former names: BBC2 (21 April 1964 – 4 October 1997)

Links
- Webcast: BBC Two on BBC iPlayer (UK only)
- Website: bbc.co.uk/bbctwo

Availability

Terrestrial
- Freeview: Channel 102 (HD); Channel 2 (SD)
- Other providers: See dedicated section

BBC Two is a British free-to-air public broadcast television channel owned and operated by the BBC. It is the corporation's second flagship channel, and it covers a wide range of subject matter, incorporating genres such as comedy, drama and documentaries. BBC Two has a remit "to broadcast programmes of depth and substance" in contrast to the more mainstream and popular BBC One.

Like the BBC's other domestic TV and radio channels, it is funded by the television licence, and is therefore free of commercial advertising. It is a comparatively well-funded public-service channel, regularly attaining a much higher audience share than most public-service channels worldwide.

Originally styled BBC2, it was the third British television station to be launched (starting on 21 April 1964), and from 1 July 1967, Europe's first television channel to broadcast regularly in colour. It was envisaged as a home for less mainstream and more ambitious programming, and while this tendency has continued to date, most special-interest programmes of a kind previously broadcast on BBC Two, for example the BBC Proms, now tend to appear on BBC Four instead.

== History ==
=== Launch ===
British television at the time of BBC2's launch consisted of two channels: the BBC Television Service and the ITV network made up of smaller regional companies. Both channels had existed in a state of competition since ITV's launch in 1955, and both had aimed for a populist approach in response. The 1962 Pilkington Report on the future of broadcasting noticed this, and that ITV lacked any culturally relevant programming. It therefore decided that Britain's third television station should be awarded to the BBC.

Prior to its launch, the new BBC2 was promoted on the BBC Television Service: the soon-to-be-renamed BBC1. The animated adverts featured the campaign mascots "Hullabaloo", a mother kangaroo, and "Custard", her joey. Prior to, and several years after, the channel's formal launch, the channel broadcast "Trade Test Transmissions", short films made externally by companies such as Shell and BP, which served to enable engineers to test reception, but became cult viewing.

The channel was scheduled to begin at 19:20 on 20 April 1964, showing an evening of light entertainment, starting with the comedy show The Alberts, a performance from Soviet comedian Arkady Raikin, and a production of Cole Porter's Kiss Me, Kate, culminating with a fireworks display. However, at around 18:45 a huge power failure, originating from a fire at Battersea Power Station, caused Television Centre, and indeed much of west London, to lose all power. BBC1 was able to continue broadcasting via its facilities at Alexandra Palace, but all attempts to show the scheduled programmes on the new channel failed. Associated-Rediffusion, the London weekday ITV franchise-holder, offered to transmit on the BBC's behalf, but their gesture was rejected. At 22:00 programming was officially postponed until the following morning. As the BBC's news centre at Alexandra Palace was unaffected, they did in fact broadcast brief bulletins on BBC2 that evening, beginning with an announcement by the newsreader Gerald Priestland at around 19:25. There was believed to be no recording made of this bulletin, but a videotape was discovered in early 2003.

By 11:00 on 21 April 1964, power had been restored to the studios and programming began, thus making Play School the first programme to be shown officially on the channel. The launch schedule, postponed from the night before, was then shown that evening, albeit with minor changes. In reference to the power cut, the transmission opened with a shot of a lit candle which was then sarcastically blown out by presenter Denis Tuohy. Initially, the channel was only available in London; when Match of the Day first aired on this channel, several clubs opted to negotiate its move to BBC1 where it had broader coverage. The core transmitter network began to grow in December 1964; by 1965, it launched in Wales, and in 1966, in Northern Ireland and Scotland.

To establish the new channel's identity and draw viewers to it, the BBC decided that a widely promoted, lavish series would be essential in its earliest days. The production chosen was The Forsyte Saga (1967), a no-expense-spared adaptation of the novels by John Galsworthy, featuring well-established actors Kenneth More and Eric Porter. Critically for the future of the fledgling channel, the BBC's gamble was hugely successful, with an average of six million viewers per episode: a feat made more prominent by the fact that only 9 million were able to receive the channel at the time. By 1972, 90% of the UK now received the channel. In 1974, BBC2's widely acclaimed singer-songwriter series, In Concert, was lauded by The Guardian as the only British music television programme that "produced television ideas".

=== David Attenborough ===
On 4 March 1965, David Attenborough became the channel's second director of programming; Michael Peacock moved over to BBC1. Innovations included additional sports programmes such as Sunday Cricket and Rugby Special, and, most importantly, increased documentary programming, as he had a clause to air some programmes that he produced, such as his wildlife documentaries. He also set his eyes on the forthcoming implementation of colour television in the UK, which BBC2 adopted in 1967, first by introducing the concept of the yellow tennis ball, and later he envisioned the addition of snooker broadcasts, as the sport used coloured balls. Programmes commissioned during this period included Man Alive, Call My Bluff, Chronicle, The Old Grey Whistle Test, Monty Python's Flying Circus and The Money Programme.

=== The 1970s ===
In 1969, Robin Scott took over Attenborough and initiated a new policy for the channel in order to target 15% of the television viewing audience: highbrow programmes would be seen by fewer viewers, while more popular programmes would be seen as "just as much a failure". This period was marked largely by successful miniseries and documentaries: The Six Wives Of Henry VIII, Elizabeth R, The Search for the Nile, Clochemerle, The Stone Tape, War And Peace, The Ascent of Man and The Pallisers. He was replaced by Aubrey Singer in 1974, then by Brian Wenham in 1978. Under the latter, he commissioned Not the Nine O'Clock News and gave more airtime to snooker and opera.

=== The 1980s ===
During Wenham's management, Newsnight launched on 28 January 1980, four months off from its planned September 1979 launch due to industrial action at the BBC. Usually the last programme of the weeknight, it would not get a fixed timeslot until 31 October 1988. Before he left, he commissioned The Young Ones.

Graeme MacDonald was appointed director in 1982, the first time a director came from the drama department (he was head of BBC television drama until 1985), until 1987 when he left the BBC. During this period, he had to face a new competitor (Channel 4) by increasing its drama output, creating Screen 2 for single dramas. He also added Star Trek repeats to the 6:30pm slot. On 6 September 1985, BBC2 started airing a slot for regional programmes, which were previously seen on BBC1 late at night. Up until then, the channel provided a single feed for England, the BBC had begun a plan to make opting more practical, as well as for the main feed from London delivering material to the regions.

Under Alan Yentob, he commissioned The Late Show, the long-running panel show Have I Got News for You and sitcom Absolutely Fabulous (which moved to BBC1 from season 2).

=== Rejuvenation in the 1990s ===
Michael Jackson took over Alan Yentob's job in April 1993, when he moved to BBC1. The channel was now catering a broader demographic and was competing against cable and satellite channels, however the channel's overall share increased from 10% to 11% during his three-year period, carrying a broad mix of leisure and factual programmes, as well as big name imports such as The X-Files. He was replaced by Mark Thompson on 22 July 1996. Following the 1996 Edinburgh Television Festival, he announced his plans, namely the development of new drama and comedy series, as well as an increase in factual and arts programmes, including the possibility of reviving Arena and Horizon. A new competitor, Channel 5, was set to start next year, and since the new channel still lacked the budget for drama productions, BBC2 had to reformulate its strategies for leisure and lifestyle programming. He was replaced by Jane Root on 17 December 1998, the first woman to do so.

=== Recent years ===
The channel as of 2024 lacked popular programming; from the start of 2023 to April 2024, the most popular programmes from the channel on the BBC iPlayer were four individual episodes of Only Connect, four from the 43rd season of Antiques Roadshow and two from The Traitors Uncloaked, a spin-off talk show of the BBC One reality show. In the same period, the channel aired Flog It! repeats over 400 times. It also started airing shows commissioned for the UKTV network.

=== Technological advancements ===
Unlike BBC1 and ITV, BBC2 was broadcast only on the 625-line UHF system, so was not available to viewers still using sets only capable of receiving the 405-line VHF system. This created a market for dual standard receivers which could switch between the two systems. Set manufacturers increased production of UHF sets in anticipation of a large market demand for the new BBC2, but the market did not materialise.

The early technical problems, which included being unable to transmit US-recorded videotapes due to a lack of system conversion from the US NTSC system, were resolved by a committee headed by James Redmond, although this problem was not unique to BBC2.

On 1 July 1967, during the Wimbledon Championships, BBC2 became the first channel in Europe to begin regular broadcasts in colour, using the PAL system. The thirteen-part series Civilisation (1969) was created as a celebration of two millennia of western art and culture to showpiece the new colour technology. BBC1 and ITV later joined BBC2 on 625-line UHF band but continued to simulcast on 405-line VHF until 1985. BBC1 and ITV simultaneously introduced PAL colour on UHF on 15 November 1969, although they both had broadcast some programmes in colour "unofficially" since September 1969.

In 1979, the station's adoption of the first computer-generated channel identification (ident) in Britain, with its use of the double striped, orange '2' logo, heralded the start of computer-generated logos. The ident, created in-house by BBC engineers, lasted until March 1986.

As the switch to digital-only terrestrial transmission progressed, BBC Two was (in each region in turn) the first analogue TV channel to be replaced with the BBC multiplex, at first four, then two weeks ahead of the other four channels. This was required for those relay transmitters that had no current Freeview service giving viewers time to purchase the equipment unless they had already selected a satellite or cable service. The last region for BBC Two to end on analogue terrestrial television was Northern Ireland on 10 October 2012.

At the 2012 Edinburgh International Television Festival, BBC Two was named "Terrestrial Channel of the Year".

A high-definition simulcast of BBC Two began broadcasting on 26 March 2013, replacing the standalone BBC HD channel. As of 29 November 2018, there are three variations of BBC Two HD (Wales, Northern Ireland, and England).

== Operation ==
The channel controllers have been:

- 1964–1965: Michael Peacock
- 1965–1969: David Attenborough
- 1969–1974: Robin Scott
- 1974–1978: Aubrey Singer
- 1978–1982: Brian Wenham
- 1982–1987: Graeme MacDonald
- 1987–1992: Alan Yentob
- 1992–1996: Michael Jackson
- 1996–1999: Mark Thompson
- 1999–2004: Jane Root
- 2004–2008: Roly Keating
- 2008–2014: Janice Hadlow
- 2014: Adam Barker (acting)
- 2014–2016: Kim Shillinglaw
- 2016–2022: Patrick Holland

Adam Barker served as Acting Controller of the channel after Janice Hadlow left the channel in March 2014 and until Kim Shillinglaw began as the new permanent occupant of the post.

From 2013, the Controller of BBC Two was given the expanded title Controller of BBC Two and BBC Four, with ultimate oversight of the BBC Four service added to their duties (a BBC Four "Channel Editor", reporting up to this Controller, was allocated day-to-day operational control of Four). The channel forms part of the BBC Television executive group and is answerable to the head of that department, and to the BBC Board.

On 20 January 2016, Kim Shillinglaw announced that she had decided to leave the BBC as the Controller of BBC Two & BBC Four; as a result of the reorganisation, the posts of Controller of BBC Two and BBC Four were closed.

Patrick Holland became Channel Controller of BBC Two in March 2017, following his earlier appointment as Channel Editor in July 2016. In 2020, it was announced that BBC channels would no longer have individual controllers, with leadership moving to a genre-based structure. Patrick Holland moved into a new role as Director of Factual.

== Programming ==
BBC Two's remit is to be a mixed-genre channel appealing to a broad adult audience with programmes of depth and substance. It should carry the greatest amount and range of knowledge building programming of any BBC television channel, complemented by distinctive comedy, drama and arts programming.

— BBC Two remit

BBC Two's historical scope was arts, culture, comedy, and drama. It aimed to be appealing to audiences not already served by BBC One or ITV. Over its first thirty or so years, the channel developed a reputation for screening highly praised and prestigious drama series, including Boys from the Blackstuff (1982), 1991's highly successful The Men's Room, the costume drama Middlemarch (1994) or 1996's critically acclaimed Our Friends in the North. The channel's "highbrow" profile is also, in part, attributable to a long history of demanding documentaries of all types, beginning with Civilisation and The Ascent of Man in the 1960s. Just as Channel 4 did in its early stages, BBC Two also established a reputation as a champion of independent and international cinema, under the Screen 2 brand.

BBC Two also serves as counterprogramming for BBC One. When One showed Panorama on Monday nights, for example, Two showed a television Western. The two networks closely coordinated schedules, and continuity announcers promoted each other's programs.

The channel has sometimes been judged, increasingly in more recent years, to have moved away from this original role and closer to the mainstream. Since the launch of the digital-only BBC Four, the BBC has been accused in particular of shifting its more highbrow output to the new channel, which, until the end of the UK's digital TV switchover in October 2012, a minority (7.5% in the final quarter of 2010) of viewers did not receive. BBC Four's remit is very similar to the earlier remit of BBC2, and contains many documentaries and arts programmes. It has been perceived by some that this strategy is to allow BBC Two to show more popular programmes and to secure higher ratings. Since 2004 there have been some signs of an attempt to return closer to parts of BBC Two's earlier output with the arts strand The Culture Show. Its most popular programme prior to its 2020 move to BBC One was motoring magazine Top Gear.

Much of BBC Two's output has previously or subsequently been shown on other channels. Some of these programmes are repeats of popular or flagship programmes from BBC Four in a late-night strand, originally called BBC Four on Two but now unbranded. Other programmes are moved to the channel as a result of their success on BBC Three or Four, so that subsequent series are well received. An example of this is the BBC Three series Torchwood, which was transferred to the channel following the success of the first series. BBC Two is also used as a testing ground for programmes prior to their moving to the flagship BBC One: such examples include Have I Got News for You and popular comedies Absolutely Fabulous and Miranda, which moved to BBC One after success on Two. Also in August 2014, The Great British Bake Off moved to BBC One, due to its success the previous year on BBC Two. In 2017, Bake Off moved from BBC One to Channel 4.

Another founding part of BBC Two was to provide educational and community programming on the BBC, as part of its public service remit. The educational section of this commitment saw BBC2 broadcast a large amount of programming for the Open University, who co-produced programming with the corporation, and saw the channel broadcast BBC Schools programmes from 1983 until the programmes were transferred to the BBC Learning Zone in 2010.

As a result of the channel's commitment to community broadcasting, the channel produced the symbolic Open Space series, a strand developed in the early 1970s in which members of the public would be allotted half an hour of television time, and given a level of editorial and technical training in order to produce for themselves a film on an issue most important to them. BBC2's Community Programme Unit kept this aspect of the channel's tradition alive into the 1990s in the form of Video Diaries and later Video Nation. The Community Programmes Unit was disbanded in 2004.

BBC Two has also given various programmes from around the world their first UK broadcasts, and have introduced many more to terrestrial audiences. International shows that have been broadcast on BBC Two include M*A*S*H, The Simpsons, 24, Family Guy, Buffy the Vampire Slayer, Malcolm in the Middle, American Dad!, The Fresh Prince of Bel-Air, The Ren & Stimpy Show, Moonlighting, The Tracey Ullman Show and Star Trek: Voyager.

In January 2013, BBC Two ceased to show children's programmes and replaced the weekday morning schedule with repeats of the previous BBC One daytime schedule, children's programmes was returned in 2017 and 2022 in Saturday morning. It also began showing Sign Zone in the early hours; prior to 2013, this had been broadcast by BBC One. This was the only channel that broadcast Sign Zone in the early hours until the relaunch of BBC Three as a television channel in 2022.

From October 2013, BBC Two has shown classic programmes like Bergerac, Cagney and Lacey, The Rockford Files, 'Allo 'Allo!, and Are You Being Served? on weekday afternoons, with the retro logos from 1970s and 1980s, between the current programmes.

In October 2014, Russell Howard's Good News and Backchat moved to BBC Two from BBC Three.

In 2014, BBC Two commissioned Britain's first transgender sitcom, Boy Meets Girl, which follows the developing relationship between Leo, a 26-year-old man, and Judy, a 40-year-old transgender woman.

From 7 April 2015, the morning Sign Zone was shown before Victoria Derbyshire 8:00 am – 9:00 am including See Hear on Wednesday morning.

BBC Two is also known for broadcasting some news and current affairs programmes. It broadcasts BBC News updates every morning at 9 am, simulcasting the BBC News channel after it stops simulcasting BBC Breakfast on BBC1. This includes an edition of BBC Business Today at 11:30 and Sportsday at 11:45, then fifteen minutes of BBC News Now, this had previously been between 2006 and 2010 an edition of World News Today and 2010–2011 GMT. At 12:15 pm during the Parliament session, political debate programme Politics Live is broadcast on BBC Two. On Wednesdays, due to the Prime Minister's Questions, the programme is broadcast at the earlier time of 11:15 am. The programme is not broadcast on Fridays or when Parliament is on a holiday break, so the simulcast of BBC News Now continues until 1:00 pm for the BBC News at One on BBC One. At 10:30 pm, current affairs programme Newsnight provides reports and analysis of the stories behind the day's headlines. BBC Two does not broadcast any news and current affairs programming at the weekend, except Sunday's during the football season when BBC One breaks away after the 7:30 am news summary from Breakfast, which continues on BBC Two until 9:00 am.

From 2017 until 2019, it broadcast the UK selection show for the Eurovision Song Contest, Eurovision: You Decide. The channel stopped broadcasting the show after the 2019 edition due to the fact that the BBC opted for an internal selection in collaboration with BMG Rights Management.

In 2020, it was reported that the programme Victoria Derbyshire would end, owing to the BBC's £80m cuts. Since the beginning of the Coronavirus pandemic, Victoria Derbyshire has been presenting the first hour of BBC News, which continues until 13:00.

BBC Two is also known for broadcasting some BBC One programmes in a change to the schedules when BBC One broadcasts breaking BBC News reports. For example, during the COVID-19 pandemic, BBC One aired press conferences from the UK government about major developments from the pandemic. However, on 9 April 2021 – the day of the death of Prince Philip, Duke of Edinburgh – BBC Two and BBC One both simulcast BBC News for the whole day. The same would happen on both 8 and 19 September 2022, following the death and state funeral respectively of Elizabeth II.

== Ratings and reception ==
In a 2013 BBC Populus poll, BBC Two had the third-highest per-country TV channel quality rating among viewers surveyed in 14 countries, behind BBC One and Brazil's TV Cultura.

== Presentation and former logos ==
1967–1972

1991–1997

1997–2001

2001–2007

2007–2018 (primary), 2018–2021 (secondary)

2021–present

The paint ident, one of the "2s" idents that were used from 16 February 1991 to 19 November 2001, and from 1 January 2015 to 27 September 2018

The 1991 idents featured a sans-serif numeral 2 at the centre of an initially art-related scene; however, the idents moved away from this style as the station's style changed. Although highly praised, this expansive set of idents was ended in November 2001. The BBC corporate logo was updated within the idents in October 1997, though the idents moved away from the original viridian colour scheme in these latter years. The subsequent presentation style was introduced on 19 November 2001 and kept the same figure 2, but in a yellow background and given a personality. At the time, BBC Two became the first BBC channel to feature a box logo.

In 2007, BBC Two debuted the new theme, a "Window on the World", with the 2 numeral providing that view. Introduced on 18 February 2007, the new look also had the channel adopt a teal-coloured box logo, featuring the BBC logo above the word TWO, now in the font Avenir.

In 2014, in honour of the channel's 50th anniversary, some of the 1990s idents were re-introduced and from 2015, BBC Two Northern Ireland opted to use nearly forty idents from the 1991–2001 set.

On 27 September 2018, the 1991–2001 idents were retired once again and BBC Two introduced a new set of idents, based on scenes incorporating a curve motif resembling the number 2. The new branding is designed to reflect BBC Two's "constant evolution, constant eclecticism, [and] constant sense of quality". The new idents are produced by various artists and studios, including Aardman Animations, The Mill and others. The new identity was developed by BBC Creative and Superunion.

=== Regional variations ===
BBC Two also has regional variations in Wales and Northern Ireland, which occasionally opt out of the national BBC Two feed to air programmes of local interest. One of those variations came in November 2001, when BBC Wales introduced a special opt-out service known as BBC 2W. It aired weekdays from 8:30 pm to 10 pm in the BBC Two Wales channel space on digital television, and carried a separate schedule of Welsh-produced programming in comparison to the analogue BBC Two Wales. BBC 2W was discontinued in 2008 due to the transition to digital terrestrial television, with the main BBC Two Wales schedule being carried on Freeview thereafter.

BBC Two Scotland operated until February 2019, when it was replaced by the national feed. Concurrently, a bespoke BBC Scotland channel was launched, which simulcasts the BBC Two schedule with opt-outs for local programming from 7:00 pm to midnight nightly, and occasionally during the afternoon for news and sports programmes.

== Availability ==
BBC Two is available via most major television providers in the United Kingdom.

=== Terrestrial ===
- Freeview: Channel 102 (HD), Channel 2 (SD)

=== Satellite ===
- Freesat: Channel 102 (HD)
- Sky: Channel 102 (HD)

=== Cable ===
- Virgin Media: Channel 102 (HD)

=== IPTV ===
- Sky Glass: Channel 102 (HD)
- Freely: Channel 2 (HD)

=== Streaming ===
- BBC iPlayer (UK only)

== Availability outside the UK ==
The Northern Irish version of BBC Two is widely available in the Republic of Ireland on satellite and cable, as well as being received directly in areas bordering Northern Ireland, or in coastal areas from Wales. The national version of BBC Two is also available on cable and IPTV in the Netherlands, Belgium, Switzerland, Monaco and Liechtenstein. The channel is registered to broadcast within the European Union/EEA through the Luxembourgish Broadcasting Regulator – ALIA.

In its early years, reception in Ireland was limited, causing RTÉ to pick up, by arrangement with the copyright holders, selected programmes aired on the channel before BBC One aired them.

On 27 March 2013, it began being carried by British Forces Broadcasting Service (BFBS) to members of HM Forces and their families around the world, replacing the BFBS 2 TV channel, which already carried a selection of BBC Two programmes. It shares a channel with CBBC, which broadcasts from early morning until the early evening.

All feeds of BBC Two in both SD and HD are broadcast unencrypted on the Astra 2E and 2G satellites, allowing viewing across Belgium, the Netherlands, the Republic of Ireland and parts of France, Germany and Spain.

== Accessibility ==
The BBC announced in May 2008 that it had achieved its aim for all programming to have subtitles for viewers with hearing difficulties. These are available on the BBC Red Button, and until 23 October 2012, via the Ceefax teletext service.

The BBC also offers audio description on some popular programmes for visually impaired-viewers as well as British sign language interpretation on some of its programmes for deaf and hard-of-hearing viewers. The percentage of the BBC's total television output with audio description available is 10%, having been increased from 8% in 2008.

== BBC Two HD ==
BBC Two HD logo (2013–2021)

Originally, programmes from BBC Two were shown in high definition on the dedicated BBC HD channel, alongside programmes from BBC Three and BBC Four, as well as some select series from CBBC and CBeebies. However, in plans outlined by the director general Mark Thompson on 6 October 2011, BBC HD would close to be replaced by BBC Two HD, a high-definition simulcast of BBC Two that would work much the same way as BBC One HD. This move allowed the corporation to save £2.1 million, used to count towards its budget deficit following the freezing of the licence fee and the additional financial responsibility of addition services.

On 19 February 2013, it was announced that BBC Two HD would replace BBC HD from 6:05 am on 26 March 2013. Channel numbers for the BBC's HD channels also changed on Sky, to allow BBC One HD and BBC Two HD to sit side-by-side on channels 141, and 142 respectively on the EPG.

On 16 July 2013, the BBC indicated that it wants to launch Northern Irish, Scottish and Welsh variations of BBC Two HD; however, this would require the approval of the BBC Trust, with a proposal due to be presented within six months.

On 10 December 2013, BBC Two HD was swapped with the SD channel in England on Sky's EPG for HD subscribers.

On 24 March 2014, BBC Two HD moved to channel 102 on Freesat in England.

In October 2018, the BBC announced that regional variants of BBC Two HD in Wales and Northern Ireland would launch at the end of November that year on terrestrial, satellite (Wales only) and iPlayer. BBC Two HD in these regions were swapped with the SD channel on Sky's EPG for HD subscribers. A Scotland variant was not launched, as BBC Two Scotland was discontinued in February 2019 in favour of the new BBC Scotland channel. BBC Two Northern Ireland HD later eventually launched on Sky and Freesat on 5 January 2023, with the SD version shutting down on Sky and Freesat on 24 January 2023.

== See also ==
- History of BBC television idents
