= Television in Scotland =

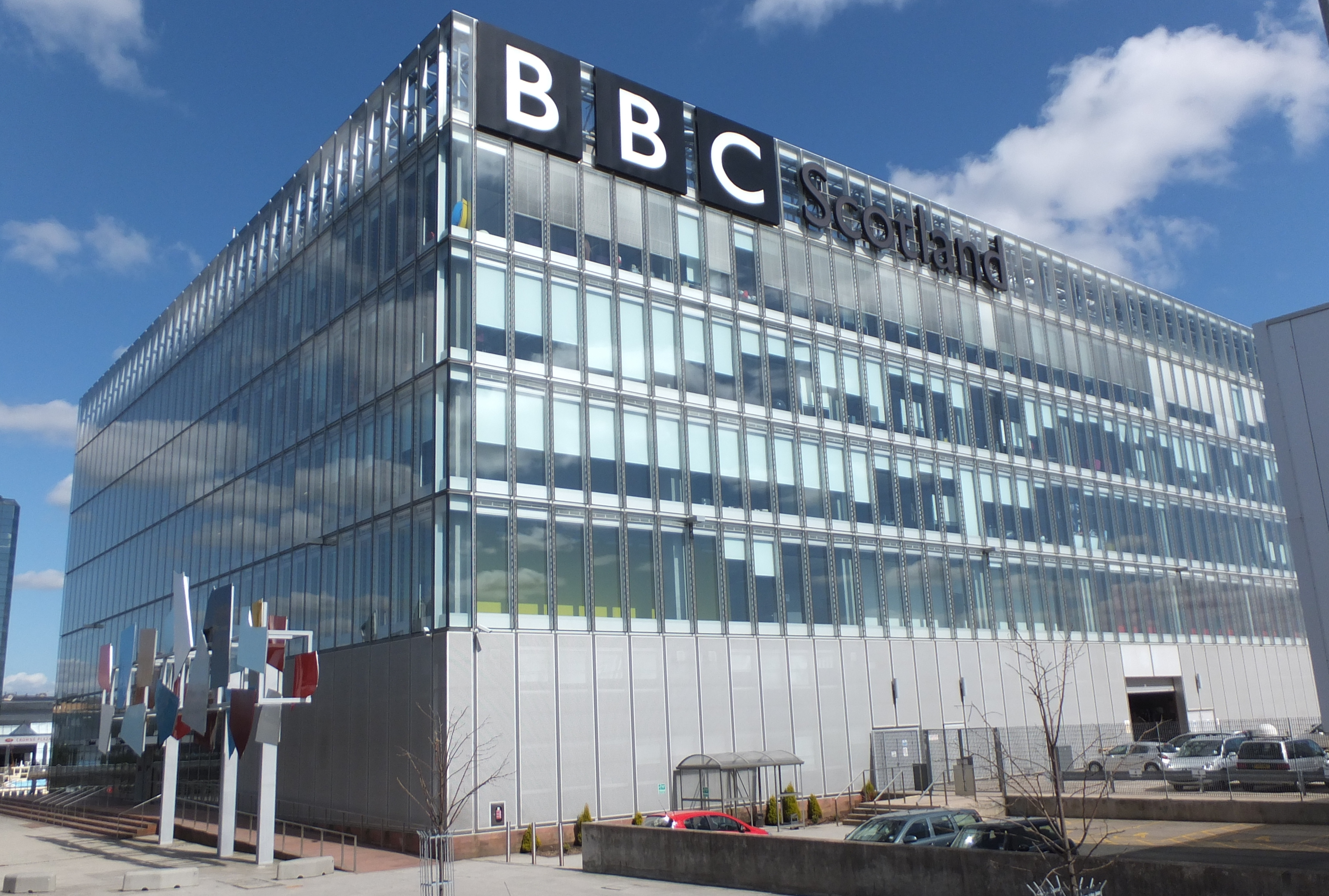
BBC Scotland is the national broadcaster in Scotland, with its HQ located at BBC Pacific Quay in Glasgow

Television in Scotland mostly consists of UK-wide broadcasts, with regional variations at different times which are specific to Scotland. The BBC and ITV networks both began broadcasting in the country during the 1950s. There were further expansions in the early 1960s with the arrival of Grampian, Border and BBC2 television. ITV services operate as STV in the country, owned and operated by the STV Group based in Glasgow. Scottish Gaelic language broadcasts are aired on the BBC Alba channel. Distinct and separate channels relating to Scotland include BBC Scotland and That's TV Scotland, which is made up of five different broadcasting licences for Aberdeen, Ayr, Dundee, Edinburgh and Glasgow following the closure of the STV2 channel in 2018.

Public Service Broadcasters (PSBs) represented the main source of demand, financing and commissioning for television programmes in Scotland. The output of PSBs primarily focus on drama, documentary, factual (specialist and entertainment) and current affairs programme productions. Television production in the country is benefited by having a number of regional PSBs around the country, including BBC Scotland and BBC Alba, whilst Channel 4 has a production hub located in the country. Scotland is the only country of the United Kingdom to have its own affiliate of the ITV network, STV. Television production in Scotland generated an estimate £184.7 million in Gross Value Added (GVA) in 2022, and spent an estimated £196.6 million in television broadcasting production in the country in 2019.

The experience of commercial expansion of television services in Scotland since has been broadly similar to that in the UK generally. Terrestrial television is available through DTT platform Freeview along with various other channels. Cable services are available to limited parts of the country with Virgin Media, satellite television is provided by Sky and IPTV services are available with BT TV and TalkTalk TV.

== History ==
Television transmissions in Scotland first began on 14 March 1952 when Britain's sole state broadcaster of the time, the BBC, started broadcasting from the transmitting station at Kirk o'Shotts using the 405-line television system. These early transmissions offered no significant separate content; all BBC programming came direct from London with only very occasional Scottish variation made using an outside broadcast unit. With time, BBC television in Scotland gradually accrued some limited rights to "opt out" of the UK network, particularly after the entry of the Independent Television (ITV) network into the picture, but it was well over 60 years before the corporation allowed an autonomous BBC television channel for the country when it finally launched a still relatively limited BBC Scotland TV service in February 2019.

ITV's Scottish Television (STV) began transmissions on 31 August 1957. Grampian Television, the ITV service for the North-East of the country, was launched in the Spring of 1960. Border Television, with its headquarters in Carlisle, transmitting across the south of Scotland and north of England, followed suit on 1 September 1961. BBC 2 arrived in Scotland in 1966, two years after its initial launch in London. At first this was a black and white service on 625-lines CCIR System I from the Black Hill transmitter. In 1967, when BBC 2 upgraded to PAL colour across the UK, this included Scotland.

Although BBC One UK network programmes upgraded to colour in 1969, local output at first was still in black-and-white. STV likewise made the upgrade to colour in December 1969, and BBC Scotland's Queen Margaret Drive Studio "A" in Glasgow followed suit in 1971, one of the first of the regional BBC studios to make the upgrade.

STV, now legally known as "STV Central Ltd", is currently the largest of the three ITV network franchises in Scotland and the second oldest active franchise holder in the UK (the oldest being ITV Granada).

== Terrestrial channels ==
BBC Scotland and STV have the largest media operations in Scotland in the field of television. BBC Scotland, STV and BBC Alba have the most broadcasting support operations between them which include both terrestrial and digital operations. At a United Kingdom wide network level (not including local spending via BBC Scotland and BBC Alba), the BBC and Channel 4 account for roughly 54% of content spending of Public Service Broadcasters (PSBs) in Scotland. BBC television services and Channel 4 accounted for 87% of expenditure in Scotland in 2019.

Viewers in Scotland receive seven public terrestrial television stations:

- BBC One Scotland
- BBC Two
- BBC Scotland
- BBC Alba
- ITV (Branded STV or ITV1 depending on location)
- Channel 4
- Channel 5

BBC Scotland and BBC Alba are dedicated channels, with BBC One and ITV being regional variants/opt-outs of British television channels. BBC Two, Channel 4, and Channel 5 are UK-wide channels.

=== BBC Scotland ===
Scotland has its own BBC services, BBC One Scotland and the BBC Scotland channel. BBC Two Scotland existed from 9 July 1966 until 17 February 2019, when it was replaced by the BBC Scotland channel. Much of the output of BBC Scotland Television, such as news and current affairs programmes, and the Glasgow-based soap opera, River City, are intended for broadcast within Scotland, whilst others, such as drama and comedy programmes, aim at audiences throughout the UK and further afield. Sports coverage also differs, reflecting the fact that the country has its own football and rugby union leagues and national teams, separate from those of the other United Kingdom constituent nations and other sporting interests unique to Scotland, such as shinty or curling.

Viewers on the Freeview HD platform within the BBC Scotland broadcasting area can now re-opt into the BBC network when Scotland opts out via BBC One HD, extending choice to Scottish viewers which was only previously an option for satellite and cable viewers.

=== ITV in Scotland ===
Map of the ITV network sub-regions in Scotland

Three ITV network stations (ITV Border, STV Central and STV North) broadcast in Scotland. In the early 1960s, Grampian Television was created to provide commercial television services serving the Highlands and Islands, but in 1997 it was bought by STV Group plc, owners of the longer established Scottish Television. In May 2006, both channels were re-branded "STV" with newsrooms in Glasgow and Aberdeen retained to provide separate news services for their respective regions. Seven months later, STV launched news opt-outs for the East of Central Scotland (broadcast from Edinburgh) and Tayside & North East Fife (broadcast from Dundee). ITV Border has had a more complex position, as it also has to serve neighbouring areas across the border in England. Most of the independent television output equates to that transmitted in England, Wales and Northern Ireland, with the exception of news and current affairs, sport, cultural and Scottish Gaelic language programming.

The available ITV network station depends on region:

- ITV Border, branded "ITV1", which covers both the Scottish and English borderlands. It is owned and operated by ITV plc. Between 2009 and 2013 the station broadcast pan-regional news bulletins with ITV Tyne Tees from Gateshead with dedicated opt-out for the Border region broadcast on weekday evenings. In 2013, separate bulletins for the Border region were restored, either broadcast live, or pre-recorded shortly before broadcast, but continuing to come from Gateshead. On 6 January 2014, the Scotland sub-region of the Border region was re-established.
- STV Central (formerly Scottish Television), branded "STV", which is based in Glasgow and covers the Central Belt of Scotland. It is owned and operated by STV Group plc, a company which evolved from the station, and since became solely interested in its core TV business once again. On weekdays, the station provides two separate editions of its regional news programme STV News at Six for the West and East of the region.
- STV North (formerly Grampian Television), branded "STV", which is based in Aberdeen, and covers Tayside, the North East and Highlands and Islands. It is also owned & operated by STV Group plc, and carries the same regional programming as shown on STV Central but produces a separate regional news service, including opt outs for Tayside and North East Fife.

== Television programming ==
=== News ===
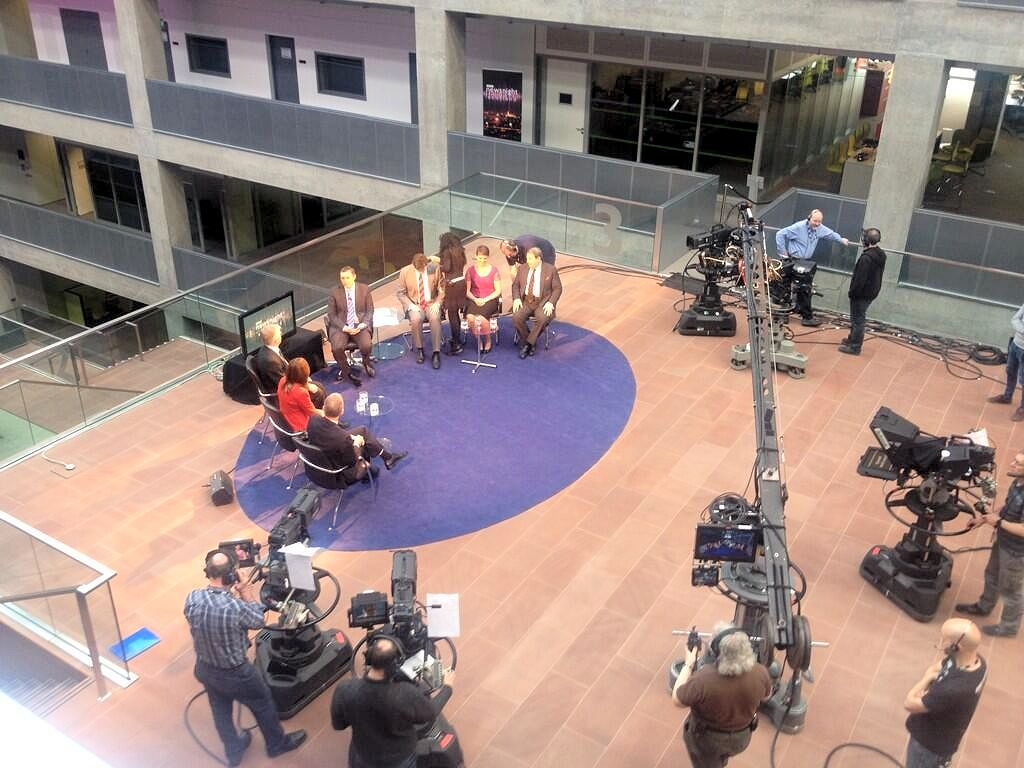
Recording for Newsnight Scotland on BBC Scotland at BBC Pacific Quay in Glasgow, 2014

There have been claims that British television news (which is the main source of news on Scottish television) does not cater to Scottish needs: in 2005, Dr Douglas MacMillan, of the University of Aberdeen found that Scottish news was "peripheral" compared with English stories. His six-month study into the BBC showed 34% of all news focused on England while just 2% was dedicated to Scotland, despite having 10% of the population. One of the longest running controversies regarding news broadcasting in Scotland has been over proposals for an early evening, weekday BBC television news programme, containing international, UK and Scottish items, produced and edited in Scotland. This proposed show is referred to as the Scottish Six.

In November 1998 Professor Lindsay Paterson resigned from the BBC's broadcasting council for Scotland in protest, after it emerged that the BBC was hostile to allowing Scotland its own news programme at 6pm. In May 2006 Mark Thompson, the Director-General of the BBC, ruled out any prospect of a Scottish Six news bulletin to replace that produced in London.

STV announced similar plans in September 2009 to launch an hour-long edition of STV News at Six, incorporating Scottish, national and international news with local ten-minute opt-outs for six sub-regions. The pan-regional programme would have replaced the two separate programmes for northern and central Scotland, however the plans were later dropped in favour of a retained North news service and the launch of two separate news services for the West and East of Central Scotland. A late night current affairs programme, Scotland Tonight, was launched in October 2011.

Stealing a march on its traditional rival, STV used the opportunity of its STV2 channel to launch an hour-long news programme, STV News Tonight airing each weeknight at 7 pm and incorporating Scottish, UK and international news. The half-hour programme, presented by Halla Mohieddeen, was produced in partnership with ITN. Due to the constraints of the channel's broadcasting arrangements - as a patchwork network of notional 'local TV' channels, mostly centred on the country's traditional cities - this was not quite national coverage. STV2 shut down in June 2018.

In February 2017, the BBC announced plans for a bespoke part-time television channel to serve Scotland, replacing the existing regional feed of BBC Two; as part of these plans, it was announced that the proposed service would feature an hour-long news and public affairs programme broadcast and produced out of Scotland, echoing the Scottish Six proposals. The channel officially launched as BBC Scotland on 24 February 2019; as promised, the channel features a nightly primetime newscast, The Nine.

=== Entertainment ===
Scotland produces a number of television shows and series, mostly soap operas and sitcoms. Notable soap operas include Take the High Road (1980–2003) and River City (2002–present). Popular sitcoms to have been filmed, set and produced in Scotland include Still Game (2002–2007; 2016–2019), Rab C. Nesbitt (1988–1999, 2008–2014), Burnistoun (2009–2019), Two Doors Down (2013–present), Chewin' the Fat (1999–2005), Gary: Tank Commander (2009–2012) and Scot Squad (2014–2023). The 2024 BBC drama Nightsleeper was filmed and set primarily in Scotland.

Other notable television series filmed in Scotland include Dinosaur (2024–present), Life of Riley (2009–2011), The Chief (2025–present), City Lights (1984–1991) and Monarch of the Glen (2000–2005). Although not set in Scotland, the BBC comedy series Mrs Brown's Boys (2011–present) is filmed at BBC Pacific Quay studios in Glasgow, as was its spin–off series All Round to Mrs. Brown's (2017–2020). A variety of critically acclaimed television series have been filmed and set in Scotland including Outlander, Katie Morag, Shetland, Taggart, Vigil and Waterloo Road.

=== Factual and current affairs ===
Factual and documentary broadcast productions in Scotland include BBC Scotland Investigates, The Scheme, Scotland's Home of the Year, Island Crossings and Inside Central Station. Current affairs programming includes Scotland Tonight, The Sunday Show, Debate Night and Eòrpa, whilst sports programming includes Sportscene and A View from the Terrace.

== Scottish Gaelic Television ==
In 1999, TeleG became the first channel to broadcast only Gaelic-language programmes. It aired for an hour every day and showed archive shows. It ceased to transmit in 2011. In 2008, BBC Alba began broadcasting with its slogan being "A new channel for Scotland". It is a joint venture with MG Alba, which produces many programmes for the channel. BBC Alba shows programmes of different genres, including general entertainment, news, documentaries, children's programmes, dramas, sport and films.

As well as these, the following channels also broadcast some Gaelic language programmes: BBC One Scotland and STV.

== Scottish television personalities ==
- Seán Batty
- Andrea Brymer
- Rona Dougall
- John Mackay
- Norman Macleod
- Sally Magnusson
- Laura Miller
- Bernard Ponsonby
- Kelly-Ann Woodland
- Lorraine Kelly

== See also ==
- Timeline of television in Scotland
- Media in Scotland
