= 2004 in Scottish television =

This is a list of events in Scottish television from 2004.

== Events ==
=== January ===
- 8 January – STV launches a new political magazine programme, called Politics Now. It replaces Platform, and Grampian's politics and current affairs programme Crossfire.

=== February ===
- 2 February – SMG’s sells its stake in GMTV to ITV plc for £31 million.

=== March ===
- 9 March – An NFO System Three poll conducted for the Scottish Consumer Council indicates that 70% of those questioned are in favour of a Scottish Six news programme replacing the main BBC Six O'Clock News from London.

=== April ===
- 20 April – 40th anniversary of BBC Two Scotland.

=== Unknown ===
- Autumn – The lunchtime edition of Scotland Today is axed.

== Debuts ==
=== BBC ===
- 21 September – Shoebox Zoo on BBC One (2004–2005)

=== ITV ===
- 8 January – Politics Now on STV (2004–2011)
- 30 September – High Times on STV (2004–2008)

== Television series ==
- Scotsport (1957–2008)
- Reporting Scotland (1968–1983; 1984–present)
- Scotland Today (1972–2009)
- Sportscene (1975–present)
- The Beechgrove Garden (1978–present)
- Grampian Today (1980–2009)
- Taggart (1983–2010)
- Only an Excuse? (1993–2020)
- Monarch of the Glen (2000–2005)
- Balamory (2002–2005)
- Still Game (2002–2007; 2016–2019)
- River City (2002–2026)
- The Karen Dunbar Show (2003–2006)

== Ending this year ==
- 2 September – Jeopardy (2002–2004)
- 22 October – Win, Lose or Draw (1990–2004)
- Unknown – Crossfire (1984–2004)

== Deaths ==
- 27 January – Rikki Fulton, 79, comedian
- 26 February – Russell Hunter, 79, actor
- 3 July – Jimmy Mack, 70, broadcaster
- 31 July – Robert James, 80, actor
- 28 November – Molly Weir, 94, actress
- Unknown – Ron Thomson, 75, journalist

== See also ==
- 2004 in Scotland
