= 1978 in Scottish television =

This is a list of events in Scottish television from 1978.

== Events ==
- 22 January – Scottish Television airs a seven-part adaptation of The Prime of Miss Jean Brodie.
- 14 April – Debut of the BBC Scotland series The Beechgrove Garden.
- 3 July – The final edition of the Scottish politics programme Public Account is broadcast on BBC1 Scotland.
- 21 December – BBC announce that Alastair Hetherington will leave his post of Controller of BBC in Scotland and take up a post of station manager for BBC Highland in Inverness.
- Scotland Today’s annual summer break is scrapped. Consequently, the programme is now on air all year round.
- Grampian Television becomes the first British television station to adopt ENG video cameras for news coverage. This move finally allows its regional news programme, Grampian Today, to extend from three to five nights a week. Grampian also develops its own outside broadcast unit, initially using studio equipment.

== Debuts ==
=== BBC ===
- 14 April - The Beechgrove Garden on BBC1 (1978–Present)
- April - The Standard on BBC1 (1978)
- 30 September - Scotch and Wry on BBC1 (1978–92)

=== ITV ===
- 22 January – The Prime of Miss Jean Brodie (1978)

== Television series ==
- Scotsport (1957–2008)
- Reporting Scotland (1968–1983; 1984–present)
- Top Club (1971–1998)
- Scotland Today (1972–2009)
- Sportscene (1975–Present)
- Garnock Way (1976–1979)

== Ending this year ==
- Public Account (1976–1978)

== Births ==
- 14 April - Michelle Duncan, actress
- 15 September - David Sneddon, singer and musician
- 10 December - Gordon Chree, broadcast journalist

== See also ==
- 1978 in Scotland
