= Scotland Tonight =

- Genre: News, current affairs
- Directed by: John Mason; Laura Trimble; Alasdair Murray
- Presented by: Rona Dougall
- Theme music composer: Rage Music
- Country of origin: United Kingdom

Production
- Production location: Glasgow/Edinburgh/Aberdeen
- Running time: 25 minutes
- Production company: STV News

Original release
- Network: STV
- Release: 24 October 2011 – present

Related
- Politics Now (Thursdays); STV News at Six

Scotland Tonight is a Scottish news and current affairs programme, covering the two STV franchise areas of Northern and Central Scotland, produced by STV News. The programme was presented by STV News at Six Central anchor John MacKay, from the first edition until his departure from STV in March 2026. MacKay would usually present the programme on Mondays and Tuesdays shared presenting duties with former Sky News Scotland correspondent Rona Dougall.

== Details ==
The half-hour programme, which launched on Monday 24 October 2011, replacing the former STV weekly-political programme Politics Now. Scotland Tonight airs at 22:40 on Monday – Wednesday nights following the late bulletin from STV News; the Thursday edition has aired in a prime-time 19:30 slot since January 2020. The programme features reports, interviews & analysis on the Scottish national news of the day alongside coverage of politics, business, sport and the arts & entertainment. In January 2022, it was announced that the Thursday edition would move one hour later to 20:30 from March 2022, due to other changes to STV's evening schedules. From January 2026, the Thursday edition reverted back to the 19:30 slot, due to STV's new "soap power hour" airing in the 20:00 slot. Since returning for a new series in August 2026, there is now no primetime episode, with just three episodes each week (Mondays-Wednesdays at 22:40).

Scotland Tonight is broadcast across both STV regions (North & Central). The programme is broadcast from studio 1 at STV's Glasgow studios, sharing the studio with the West edition of STV News at Six.

Gordon Chree, Colin Mackay, Aasmah Mir, Halla Mohieddeen, Bernard Ponsonby, Claire Stewart and Kelly Ann Woodland have each presented on occasion.

== Specials ==
- Rangers – The Downfall: 14 June 2012
- Independence Referendum: Edinburgh Agreement: 15 October 2012
- Referendum Debate: Nicola Sturgeon vs Michael Moore: 16 May 2013
- Referendum Debate: Nicola Sturgeon vs Anas Sarwar: 5 September 2013
- Referendum Debate: Nicola Sturgeon vs Alistair Carmichael: 27 November 2013
- Referendum Interactive Debate: 29 November 2013
- 2013 Glasgow helicopter crash: 2 December 2013
- Referendum Debate: Nicola Sturgeon vs Johann Lamont: 25 February 2014
- Europe Special: 2 April 2014, live from Brussels.
- Death of Margo MacDonald: Friday 4 April 2014
- Salmond & Darling: The Debate (reaction and analysis): Tuesday 5 August 2014
- UK 2015 general election (reaction and analysis): Friday 8 May 2015
- Europe Special: 25 June 2015, live from Brussels.
- 5th Birthday Special: 24 October 2016.

Special extend programmes are also held for any Scottish By-election, usually presented by Bernard Ponsonby.
