= Colin Mackay (journalist) =

Scottish journalist

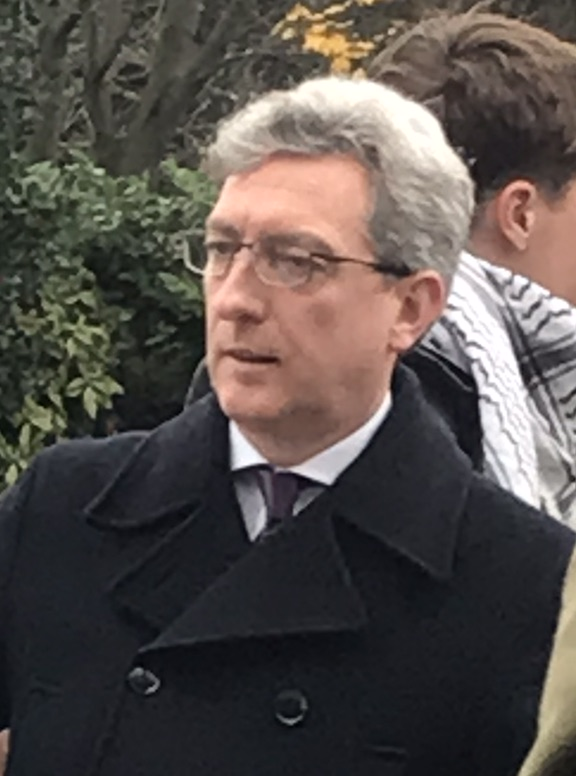
- Mackay in 2023
- Occupations: Broadcaster, journalist
- Employers: Bauer Radio (1999–2015); STV (2015–present)
- Known for: STV News; Scotland Tonight

Colin Mackay is a Scottish journalist who works as a political editor for STV News and is also the Monday night presenter of Scotland Tonight.

== Career ==
Mackay joined STV in 2015 replacing Claire Stewart. Prior to this Mackay worked for Bauer Radio for 16 years as their Scottish Political Editor.

In 2007 Mackay won "News Reporter of the Year award" at the Independent Radio News Awards; Mackay said: "I'm honoured to receive and I'm extremely flattered to be recognised in such a category."

Mackay became Political Editor of STV News in 2019, taking over the role from Bernard Ponsonby, who became Special Correspondent.

In 2023, he interviewed Prime Minister Rishi Sunak. A recording of the encounter went viral, as Sunak appeared to evade Mackay's questioning about whether or not he would recognize hypothetical Scottish independence.
