= Tyrone Smith (journalist) =

- Born: 1975 (age 50–51)
- Education: University of Aberdeen; University of Strathclyde
- Occupations: Broadcaster, journalist, producer
- Years active: 1998–present
- Employer(s): STV (previously Grampian TV) (1998–2018), Scot FM, Northsound Radio
- Notable work: North Tonight; STV News

Tyrone Smith is a Scottish broadcast journalist, television presenter and producer, who presented the sports news on Grampian Television (later STV North) for over 20 years.

Smith graduated from the University of Aberdeen with an Honours Degree in Politics and International Relations. He then graduated from the University of Strathclyde with a Postgraduate Diploma in Journalism.

Smith gained extensive journalistic experience with Scot FM in Edinburgh, Aberdeen's Northsound Radio, Q FM, and in student radio before joining Grampian Television in 1998. He became the main Sports Presenter for the stations' North Tonight programme two years later and later became Sports Editor for the North division of STV.

He now works for B.B.C. Scotland.
