= The Road Dance =

2022 film by Richie Adams and John MacKay

- Directed by: Richie Adams
- Written by: John MacKay; Richie Adams
- Produced by: Maryilene Blondell; Jim Kreutzer; Steve Shapiro
- Starring: Hermione Corfield; Will Fletcher; Morven Christie; Mark Gatiss; Ali Fumiko Whitney; Alison Peebles
- Cinematography: Petra Korner
- Edited by: Matt Mayer
- Music by: Carlos Jose Alvarez
- Production company: Sheridan Road Productions
- Distributed by: Parkland Entertainment
- Release date: 20 May 2022
- Running time: 118 minutes
- Countries: Scotland, United Kingdom
- Language: English
- Box office: $381,680

The Road Dance is a 2022 film written by Richie Adams and John MacKay. The film is based on a novel by the same name, also written by MacKay. It is set in the early years of World War I on the Isle of Lewis in the Outer Hebrides, where it was also filmed.

== Plot ==
Kirsty is a young woman who lives in Garenin with her widowed mother, Mairi, and sister Annie. She wants to go to America with her boyfriend Murdo, but these plans are derailed when he and other young men are called up for service in the Great War. The town holds a cèilidh in the road, hence the title, to honor the men before they leave the next day; however, that night Kirsty is attacked by an unknown assailant. A subsequent examination by the village doctor, Maclean, shows that she was raped.

As time passes, Kirsty discovers that she is pregnant and tries to hide it. She eventually tells her sister and mother after learning that Murdo is dead. Kirsty gives birth prematurely and the baby dies. Overcome by her grief and the memories of the rape, Kirsty tries to commit suicide by jumping off a cliff while holding the baby. She is rescued by her mother, but the baby falls.

The baby's body is discovered on the beach the following day, and Police Constable McRae investigates. He orders Maclean to examine Kirsty's body after learning that she could be the mother; however, Maclean lies on her behalf. Constable McRae orders a second examination by another doctor, who concurs and adds that Kirsty is a virgin. Kirsty realizes that her assailant was Maclean and confronts him. He commits suicide after she leaves. The constable discovers that the second physician had examined Annie, not Kirsty. He confronts the family but chooses to let the matter go after learning of the rape.

A year passes and Kirsty leaves to live with Murdo's uncle in America. The film ends on a happy note when she is reunited with Murdo, who is revealed to have been held as a prisoner of war in Germany.

== Cast ==
- Hermione Corfield as Kirsty Macleod
- Felicity Keenan as Young Kirsty
- Morven Christie as Mairi Macleod, Kirsty's mother
- Ali Fumiko Whitney as Annie Macleod, Kirsty's sister
- Will Fletcher as Murdo MacAulay, Kirsty's love interest
- Mark Gatiss as Dr Maclean
- Alison Peebles as Old Peggy, villager
- Sean Gilder as Peter, villager
- Jeff Stewart as Skipper, a recluse who Kirsty and her family help to look after
- Luke Nunn as Angus MacSween, a friend of Murdo's
- Tom Byrne as Iain Ban, a friend of Murdo's
- Scott Miller as Calum Morrison
- Ian Pirie as Constable McRae
- Liam Brennan as Mack Morrison
- David Brooks as Kirsty's father

== Production ==
=== Development ===
Co-producer Jim Kreutzer had read The Road Dance by journalist and author John Mackay and was looking for a project outside of the US. Mackay had already written a script based on his own book, but Kreutzer thought it was too dark. Director Richie Adams re-fashioned the script. It was brought to the screen by producers Kreutzer and Maryilene Blondell.

=== Filming ===
Filming began in October, 2020 during the COVID-19 pandemic and was filmed on location at Gearrannan Blackhouse Village (a restored village) near Carloway on the Isle of Lewis.

== Release ==
The film was premiered at the 2021 Edinburgh International Film Festival. The film was released on 20 May 2022.

== Critical response ==
On review aggregation website Rotten Tomatoes, 83% of 30 critics' reviews were positive, giving an average score of 6.80 out of 10. Metacritic, which uses a weighted average, gave the film a mixed score of 54, based on 7 reviews.

The Guardian's review gave the film 3 out of 5 stars, stating, "although a little too performatively Scottish at times, this is a competently made weepie that should please fans of the book." The Sydney Morning Herald gave it 3.5 out of 5 stars and praised the filming locations and strong cast. The Irish Times gave the film 3 out of 5 stars. They praised the acting and production but compared the story to an afternoon movie along the lines of a Catherine Cookson novel.

=== Awards ===
The film premiered at the Edinburgh International Film Festival (2021) where it won the Audience Award for Best Film. It later won the jury prize for best feature at the Manchester Film Festival. Internationally, The Road Dance won the audience choice award for best feature drama at the Sedona International Film Festival.
