= Claire Stewart =

Claire Stewart may refer to:

- Claire Stewart (journalist)
- Claire Stewart (politician)
