= Vale of Leven Academy =

Coordinates: 55.9804°N 4.5810°W

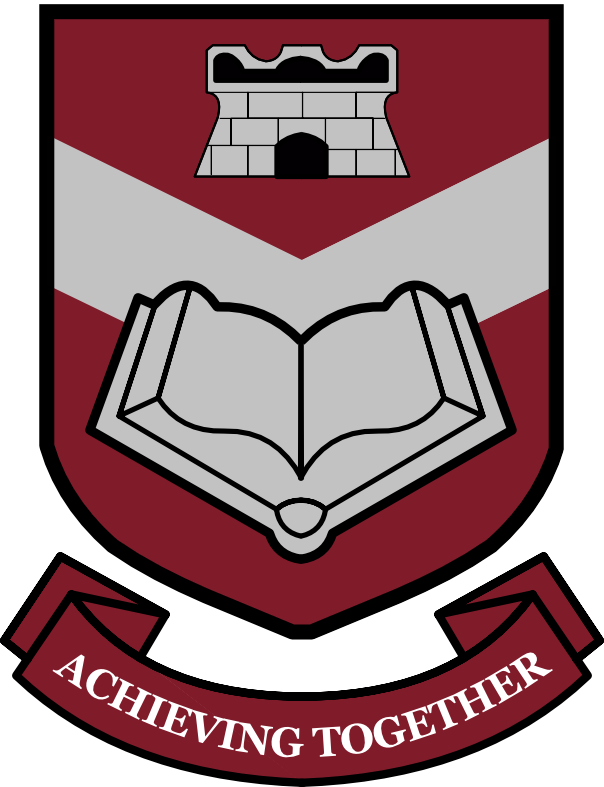

Location
- Main Street; Alexandria, West Dunbartonshire, G83 0BH; Scotland

Information
- Type: Secondary
- Motto: 1884 - 2010 Latin: Virtus Sola Nobilitas (Virtue is the only nobility) 2010 - Present: Achieving Together
- Established: 1884
- Local authority: West Dunbartonshire Council
- Head Teacher: Matthew Boyle
- Staff: 150
- Gender: Mixed
- Age: 11 to 18
- Enrolment: 987
- Capacity: 1100
- Houses: Fleming; Grainger; McKellen
- Colours: Maroon and Silver
- SEED Number: 8304831
- Website: http://valeoflevenacademy.net

Vale of Leven Academy within West Dunbartonshire

Vale of Leven Academy is a non-denominational secondary school in West Dunbartonshire, Scotland. The school serves the surrounding towns of Alexandria, Balloch, Bonhill, Jamestown, and Renton. The current school building, opened in June 2009, has a capacity of approximately 1,100 pupils.

== History ==
The school originally opened in 1884 as North Public School, in what now houses Christie Park Primary. The building expanded in 1894 and allowed pupils to complete the first two years of secondary education. It was raised to the status of secondary school in 1909 and renamed to the Vale of Leven Academy. The school moved to its current location in 1962.

The school is situated in the south of Alexandria, on the border with Renton. The school site also includes St. Martin's RC Primary school. This site was first used in 1962 when the school relocated there from its previous location.

By the early 1970s the school had become overcrowded with many classes taking place in temporary huts. A new building or extension was opened in 1973, in the place of the tennis courts, adding 28 new classrooms along with a large gym hall, library and cafeteria.

In 1996 the school was used as a filming location for Scottish Television series Take the High Road, specifically for school scenes starring Gary Hollywood's character Dominic. Filming took place during school holidays and many pupils came in uniform to act as extras.

In the early hours on Saturday, 22 June 2002 the 'New Annexe' (still called that 3 decades after being built) was set on fire, completely destroying the building and spreading debris up to three miles away. For the next seven years many lessons were taught in temporary portacabins.

In early 2008 building work started on a new school building, a public private partnership between West Dunbartonshire Council and Dutch company BAM. the school was finished in June 2009 and opened for the next school term that August.

In February 2011 the school was evacuated after a pupil brought in a grenade as part of a history project. The Police, Fire Brigade, and Royal Naval Bomb Disposal Squad were called to the school and the grenade was removed and safely blown up in controlled explosion. The school reopened later on in the afternoon.

In 2018, a few weeks after the reopening of the school after the summer holidays, the school was evacuated after an act of wilful fire raising by a pupil in the first floor toilets. The fire brigade responded and extinguished the fire by mid-morning, and the pupils were sent home. The school reopened as normal the next day.

== Head Teachers ==
Head teachers include:

- Alex Rannie (c. 1960–74)
- Tom Murray (1974 – c. 1980)
- Duncan Penny
- Angus McDonald
- Terry Lanagan
- Catriona Robertson (2009–16)
- Paul Darroch (2016–17)
- Matthew Boyle (2017–present)

== Notable students ==
- David Currie - journalist and presenter of Sportscene on BBC Scotland
- Peter Haining - 1986 Commonwealth Games Lightweight Coxless Four champion
- Bobby Kerr - former football midfielder who captained Sunderland to victory in the 1973 FA Cup Final
- Ian McColl - Scottish football defender who played for Queen's Park, Rangers and the Scotland national team, and later managed the Scotland national team and Sunderland
- Sharleen Spiteri - singer-songwriter; guitarist; lead vocalist of the Scottish pop-rock band Texas
- Stuart David - co-founder of the bands Belle and Sebastian and Looper
- Kelly Ann Woodland - news journalist and reporter STV news
- Lynn Faulds Wood - Scottish television presenter and journalist
- Lachie Stewart - 1970 Commonwealth Games 10000m Gold Medal winner

== Notable former teachers ==
- Alastair Campbell, Lord Bracadale - retired senior Scottish judge

== Images ==
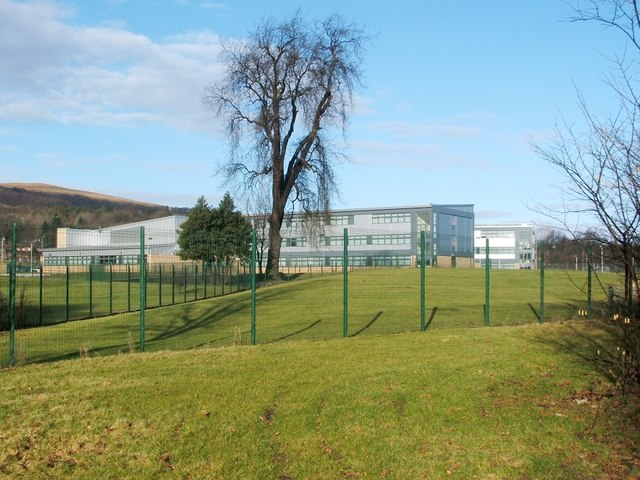
The new school building from the South

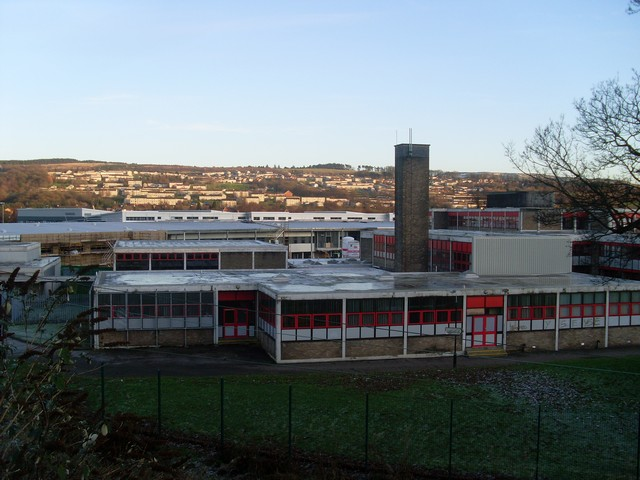
The old school building

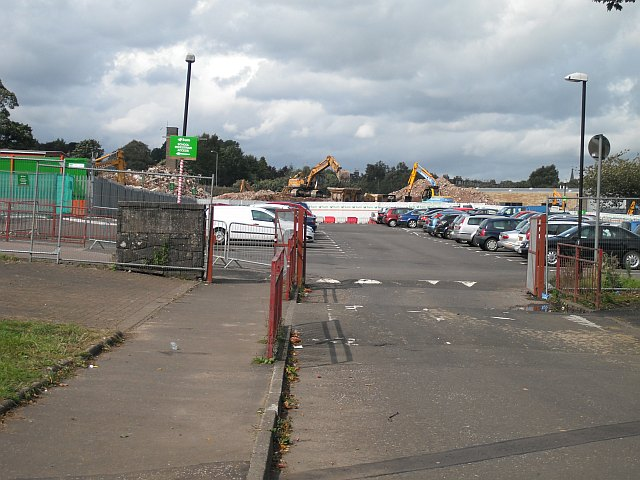
The demolition of the old school building
