= Michael Crow (journalist) =

Scottish political journalist

Michael Crow is a former Scottish political journalist who worked as Director of Strategy and Communications at the Scottish Conservative Party from 2009 until 2010. Following the 2010 UK General Election in which the Scottish Conservatives won only one seat, Crow's post was terminated due to 'financial constraints'.

Prior to his appointment on 4 January 2009, he was a political correspondent for nearly 15 year at Scottish television channel, STV, working on regional news programmes Scotland Today and North Tonight and presenting the weekly political programmes: Platform, Crossfire and Politics Now.
