= Kirstin Gove =

Kirstin Gove (formerly Haggarty, born 1973) is a Scottish PR & media consultant, who previously worked as a broadcast journalist and presenter for STV North (formerly Grampian Television).

Gove was born in Glasgow but moved to Aberdeen at the age of three. Both of her parents are former full-time teachers in Aberdeen. Gove attended Ashley Road Primary School and Aberdeen Grammar School, and graduated in 1995 with a MA Honours degree in German and International Relations.

Gove joined Grampian Television in 1995 from a work placement scheme on a local newspaper. Within a year, Gove became a sports presenter and occasional anchor for the nightly news programme North Tonight. Between 1998 and 2006, she was a regular main anchor for North Tonight. She later became a part-time bulletin presenter and newsgathering editor for STV News at Six.

Gove also presented a number of other regional programmes for Grampian TV including Testimony, Off The Wall, Inquisition, The Buck Stops Here, Grampian Weekend and Grampian Midweek. She has also worked at Westminster as a production journalist for the monthly Scottish Questions programme and a reporter for the flagship political programme Crossfire. Most recently, she also presented and produced Ask Kirstin, a feedback series for STV North's video blog Northern Exposure.

Gove left STV North in December 2009 to become a communications training manager for the Aberdeen-based media and communications agency, AVC Media Enterprises. In June 2011, she joined the PR firm Weber Shandwick as Account Director in its Aberdeen offices before moving to Aberdeen-based marketing agency Covey McCormick (now Citrus:Mix) five months later.
