= Never a Dull Moment =

Never a Dull Moment may refer to:

== Film ==
- Never a Dull Moment (1943 film), starring the Ritz Brothers
- Never a Dull Moment (1950 film), starring Irene Dunne and Fred MacMurray
- Never a Dull Moment (1968 film), starring Dick Van Dyke and Edward G. Robinson

== Literature ==
- Never a Dull Moment, a 1941 novel by Trevor Wignall
- Never a Dull Moment (novel), a 1942 thriller by Peter Cheyney
- Never a Dull Moment: Honest Questions By Teen-agers... With Honest Answers, a 1955 non-fiction book by Eugenia Price
- Never a Dull Moment, a 1974 non-fiction book by Ron Thomson
- Never a Dull Moment, a 2002 non-fiction book by Charles Manners, Nancy Manners and Ron Manners
- 1971 – Never a Dull Moment: Rock's Golden Year, a 2016 non-fiction book by David Hepworth
- George V: Never a Dull Moment, a 2021 biography by Jane Ridley

== Music ==
- Never a Dull Moment (Rod Stewart album), 1972
- Never a Dull Moment (Tommy Lee album), 2002
- Never a Dull Moment (EP) by Willie the Kid & Lee Bannon, 2010
