= Carloway =

Coordinates: 58.283°N 6.767°W

Carloway: Scottish Gaelic: Càrlabhagh
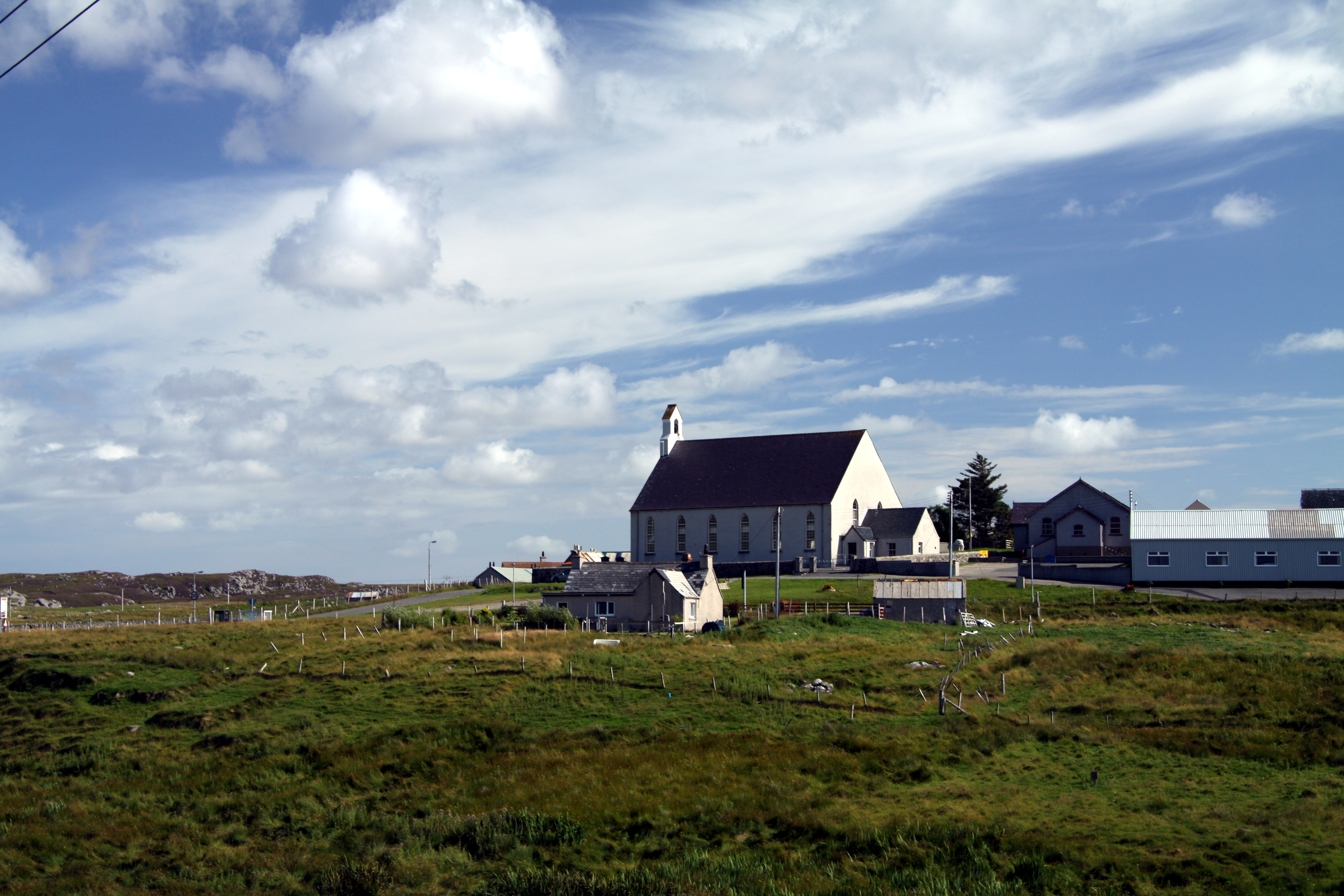
- Church in Carloway

- Location within the Outer Hebrides
- Population: 500 (approx.)
- Language: Scottish Gaelic; English
- OS grid reference: NB206425
- Civil parish: Uig
- Council area: Na h-Eileanan Siar
- Lieutenancy area: Western Isles
- Country: Scotland
- Sovereign state: United Kingdom
- Post town: ISLE OF LEWIS
- Postcode district: HS2
- Dialling code: 01851
- Police: Scotland
- Fire: Scottish
- Ambulance: Scottish
- UK Parliament: Na h-Eileanan an Iar
- Scottish Parliament: Na h-Eileanan an Iar

Carloway (Scottish Gaelic: Càrlabhagh [ˈkʰaːɾɫ̪ə.ɤː]) is a crofting township and a district on the west coast of the Isle of Lewis, in the Outer Hebrides, Scotland. The district has a population of around 500. Carloway township is within the parish of Uig, and is situated on the A858.

== The district ==
Carloway is very attractive for tourism, with many historic sites to see, such as the Garenin Blackhouse Village and the Iron Age Doune Carloway Broch. There is also a standing stone called "Clach an Tursa" in Upper Carloway.

The Carloway Bridge is said to be one of Scotland's oldest flyovers, being built in the mid-19th century. The bridge crosses the Carloway River and the Pentland Road, which leads from Carloway Pier and Harbour to Stornoway.

The district of Carloway (after the village of that name) which hitherto had fallen partly within the parishes of Lochs and Uig, became a separate civil registration district in 1859.

The district is divided into eight townships: Knock Carloway, Park Carloway, Doune Carloway, Upper Carloway, Garenin, Borrowston, Kirivick and Dalmore. The Estate starts at the cattle grid between Garynahine and Callanish and ends at the Bragar cattle grid, just leaving Shawbost towards Bragar.

Services in the community include an off-licensed community shop and community centre, a hotel, bar and restaurant, youth hostel, a newly renovated Harris Tweed mill, a pier, general medical practice and day centre, a museum, two churches (The Free Church of Scotland and The Church of Scotland), a football pitch, a war memorial and a historical society.

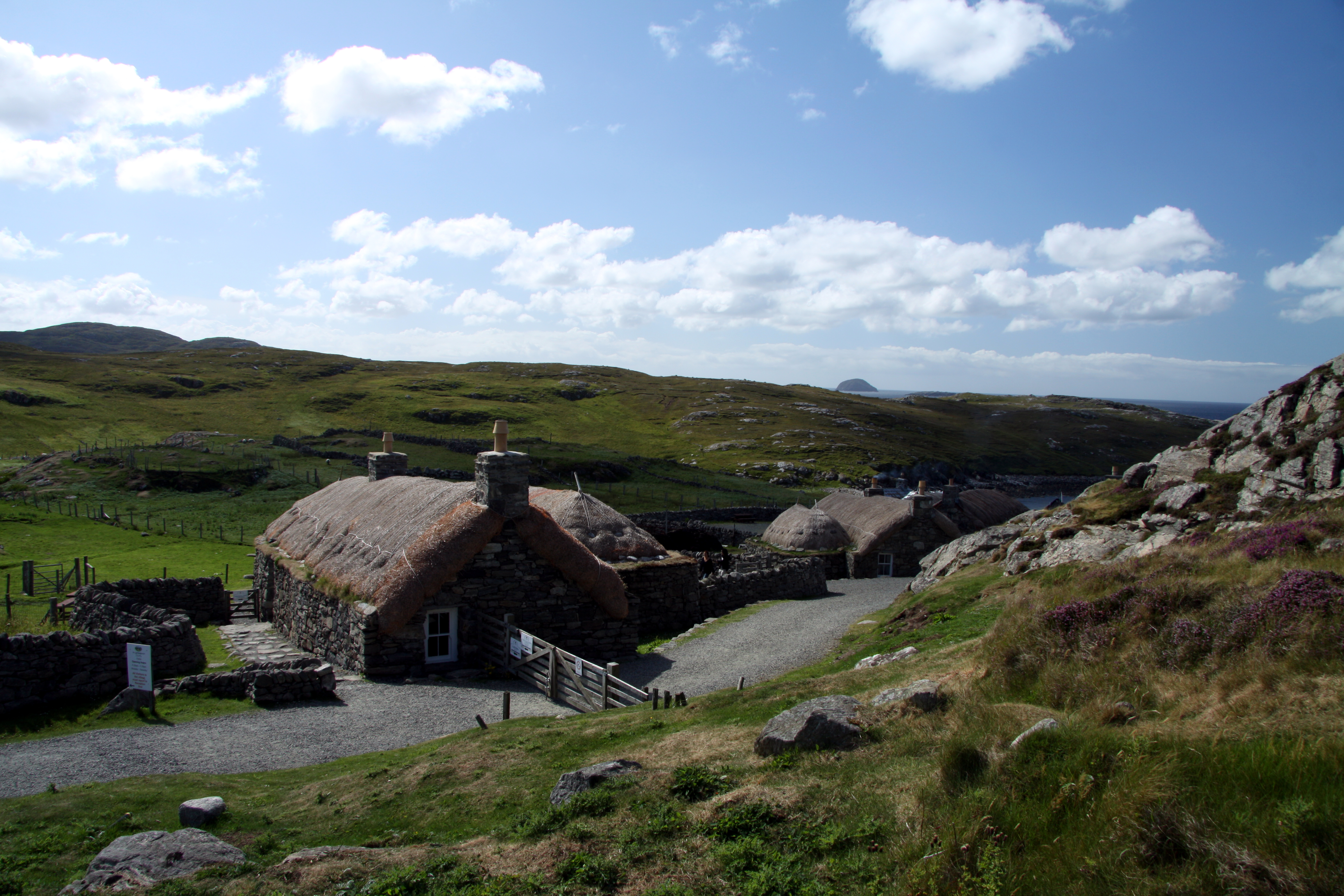
Black houses, a museum in the village

The district is known throughout the Western Isles for its Agricultural Show and Highland Games, held annually on the first Wednesday of August at the Show Ground, behind Carloway School in the centre. It is the longest running agricultural show and Highland Games on the island, first held in 1911 and officially the oldest since Beinn-na-Dròbh agricultural show stopped in Stornoway. It is locally known as the island's "Premiere Show", and 2,500 people attending the 58th Agricultural Show in 2011, more than the previous year's attendance.

Three routes connect Carloway with the main town of Stornoway:

- The main road heading north, which passes through Shawbost, Bragar and Barvas, where it splits: one road goes to Stornoway and another goes to Ness.
- The main road heading south, which passes through Breasclete, Callanish and Leurbost, which also splits: one road goes to Stornoway and another to both Balallan and Tarbert, Harris.
- The third and most direct route is the single-track Pentland road, which goes straight across the island's Pentland Moor.

== Climate ==
Climate data for Carloway
Month	Jan	Feb	Mar	Apr	May	Jun	Jul	Aug	Sep	Oct	Nov	Dec	Year
Mean daily maximum °C (°F)	8 (46)	8 (46)	8 (46)	10 (50)	13 (55)	14 (57)	16 (61)	16 (61)	15 (59)	12 (54)	10 (50)	8 (46)	12 (53)
Mean daily minimum °C (°F)	2 (36)	1 (34)	1 (34)	3 (37)	4 (39)	7 (45)	8 (46)	8 (46)	6 (43)	4 (39)	3 (37)	1 (34)	4 (39)
Average rainfall mm (inches)	143 (5.6)	117 (4.6)	109 (4.3)	78 (3.1)	62 (2.4)	72 (2.8)	72 (2.8)	86 (3.4)	93 (3.7)	127 (5.0)	131 (5.2)	114 (4.5)	1,204 (47.4)

== Religion ==
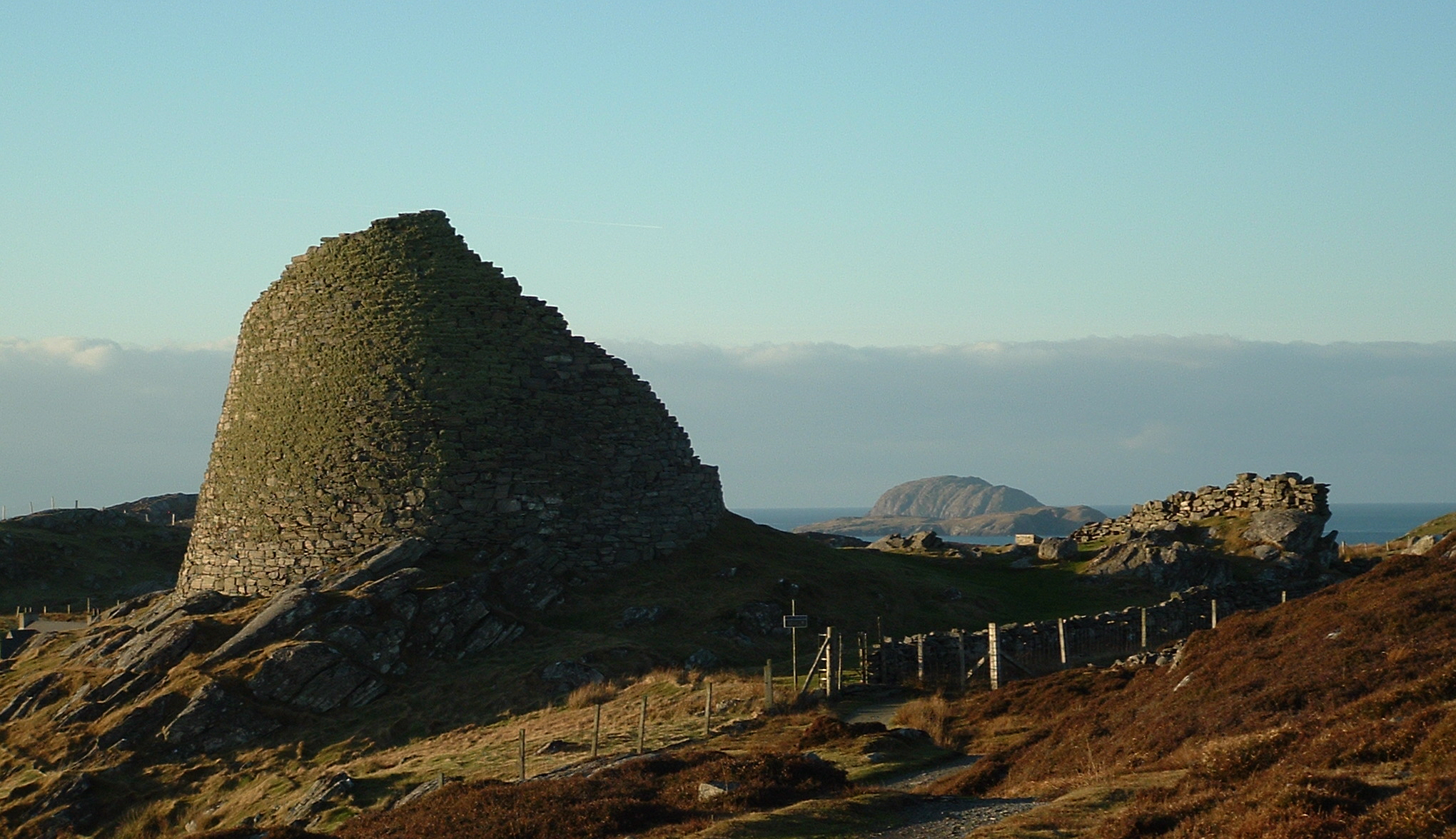
Dun Carloway Broch, Lewis

The district has two churches, both of which are located near the Carloway Bridge in the Knock Carloway township. The Free Church of Scotland was built in 1884 and has a congregation of up to 100 people. Services are conducted in both English and Scottish Gaelic. The Church of Scotland is next door to the Free Church and was built in 1908. It has a congregation with just over 50 people, with services conducted in English.

=== Teampall Chiarain ===
The ruins of an older church Teampall Chiarain (St Ciaran's) are located on the east side of the Laimishader peninsula at the foot of a crag at the end of the path. Folklore says that those who were ill were brought to this chapel, walked clockwise around it and made to sleep the night inside and this would cure the afflicted person.

=== Teampall Mhìcheil ===
Another ruined church Teampall Mhìcheil (St Michael's) is located on the southern shore of Loch Carloway, across the water from Borrowston and Port Laimishader. It is also next to the ruins of the post-medieval township of Baile an Teampaill. The inhabitants of the area used to paint their croft numbers on the unmarked grave stones in tar.

== Football ==
Football is by far the most favoured sport in the area. Carloway F.C. was founded in 1933 and first constituted in 1946 after the Second World War, playing their games on turf at Altan Feirigro in Garenin, before relocating to land near Cnoc a' Choilich in Upper Carloway. The club's catchment area covers the Parish of Uig area between Dalmore and Breanish. The club won its first trophy in 1952 after beating league champions Point 5–1 to win the Stornoway Cup. Between 1955 and 1957, Carloway won several more trophies: a 5–1 victory against Back to win the D'Oyle Carte Cup and a 4–1 victory against Point to win the Tormod Mor Tankard, both in 1956. The following year they defeated Stornoway United to win the Stornoway Cup for the second time. During that period it was rare to see a final without the involvement of the club, with the Eilean Fhraoich Cup Final seeing Carloway three years in a row, despite the club failing to win. Since this successful period in the 1950s, it took the club until 2012 to win their next trophy, defeating Back 7–6 on penalties to lift the Co-operative Cup after a 1–1 draw. In the same week, the club secured the double by winning the Lewis Cup, again on penalties, after drawing 3–3 against rivals West Side. In 2013, Carloway recently won the Acres Boys Club Cup after defeating Back 6–0 in the final, as well as the Jock Stein Cup after defeating rivals West Side 3–0 in the final. Carloway also won their first League title in their eighty-year history. The club boasts the largest support in the Western Isles and indeed one of the best playing surfaces in the Highlands and Islands, which was opened in 1991 with a friendly against Rangers reserves. The match attracted around 1100 spectators to the newly built pitch, which had been renovated twice (1949–51 and 1991) since its construction in 1935. Two players who have played for Carloway went on to play football at professional level: Ronnie MacKinnon, who played for Rangers and Scotland, and his brother Donnie, who played for Partick Thistle.

== Carloway townships ==
District of Carloway	Sgìre Chàrlabhaigh
Townships	Bailtean
Borrowston	Borghastan
Dalmore	Dail Mòr
Doune Carloway	Dùn Chàrlabhaigh
Garenin	Na Gearrannan
Kirivick	Cìrbhig
Knock Carloway	Cnoc Chàrlabhaigh
Park Carloway	Pairc Chàrlabhaigh
Upper Carloway	Mullach Chàrlabhaigh

== Notable Carlowegians and people connected with the district ==
- Angus MacInnes, actor, plays Sonny Munro in the Scottish soap River City (mother comes from Borrowston, Carloway)
- John MacKay, main anchor on Central edition of STV News at Six (father and mother come from the Carloway townships of Kirivick and Garenin respectively)
- Willie MacKay, football agent (father comes from Kirivick, Carloway)
- Ronnie MacKinnon, former Carloway, Rangers and Scotland men's national football team (twin brother of Partick Thistle player, Donnie MacKinnon; their mother came from Upper Carloway)
- Colin Sutherland, Lord Carloway, the most senior judge of the Supreme Courts of Scotland and head of the Scottish Judiciary
- Christine Primrose, traditional Scottish Gaelic singer
- Norrie MacIver, former member of the band Skipinnish
