= Fiona Ross (journalist) =

Scottish journalist and broadcaster

Fiona Ross OBE is a Scottish journalist and broadcaster.

Ross, the daughter of former Scottish Labour Party chief William Ross, worked in the newsroom of Radio Clyde before joining Scottish Television in the early 80s, where she became a long-standing Political Correspondent, working chiefly on Scotland Today.

Ross also, from time to time, presented the main evening edition of Scotland Today, from its headquarters in Glasgow.

Ross retired from STV in 2000 but returned a year later as a consultant and commentator for the station's coverage of the 2001 general election. In the same year, she also co-produced one-off documentary The Dewar Years, alongside current STV political editor Bernard Ponsonby. In June 2005, Ross was awarded an OBE in the Queen's Birthday Honours list for her services to journalism in Scotland.

She is now a freelance broadcaster and specialises in media training. She is also the chairwoman of the Dystonia Society.
