= Claire Stewart (journalist) =

Scottish broadcast journalist

Claire Stewart is a Scottish broadcast journalist, best known as a former political correspondent for STV News.

== Career ==
Stewart joined STV North (formerly Grampian Television) in 2004 as an Aberdeen-based reporter and bulletin presenter. In February 2011, she moved to STV's Edinburgh newsroom, covering Edinburgh, the Lothians, and Fife, to work on the newly launched East edition of STV News at Six. Seven months later, she was promoted to become the station's Edinburgh-based political correspondent, covering the Scottish Parliament.

Alongside her work for STV's political unit, Stewart also covered Scottish politics for ITV News and presented the current affairs programme Scotland Tonight. She left STV in May 2015.

== Notes ==
Preceded by Jamie Livingstone	Political Correspondent (STV News at Six); September 2011	Succeeded by N/A
