= Salmond & Darling: The Debate =

- Directed by: John Mason
- Presented by: Bernard Ponsonby; John MacKay
- Starring: Alex Salmond; Alistair Darling
- Country of origin: United Kingdom
- Original language: English

Production
- Executive producer: Gordon MacMillan
- Producer: Stephen Townsend
- Production location: Royal Conservatoire of Scotland
- Editor: Howard Simpson
- Camera setup: Multi-camera
- Running time: 102 minutes (approx.)
- Production company: STV

Original release
- Network: STV; ITV Border (Scotland)
- Release: 5 August 2014

Salmond & Darling: The Debate is a Scottish television debate that was first broadcast on STV on 5 August 2014. The two-hour broadcast marked the first face-to-face debate between First Minister Alex Salmond and Alistair Darling, chairman of the Better Together Campaign, ahead of the forthcoming Scottish independence referendum, in front of a studio audience of 350 people.

The debate, moderated by Bernard Ponsonby, saw both politicians make opening statements and cross-examine each other before taking questions from the audience. At the end of the clash, they were both given the chance to make a closing speech.

== Responses ==
Opinion polling by Survation ahead of the broadcast suggested that the general public expected Salmond to win, but a snap poll conducted by ICM stated Darling won the debate by 56% to 44%. In his analysis of the ICM poll, Professor John Curtice detected little movement either way as a result of the debate.

Amongst the national newspapers, The Herald, Daily Record and The Times reckoned that Darling won, while The Scotsman and The Scottish Sun considered the debate a draw. A readers' poll for the Edinburgh Evening News found 37% in favour of Salmond, 38% thought Darling had won and 24% considered it a tie. Both campaign groups claimed victory.

Summarising the debate in its aftermath, BBC Scotland correspondent Colin Blane wrote:

There were noisy exchanges. Alistair Darling pressed Alex Salmond repeatedly about which currency he would use if the rest of the UK refused to enter a currency union. For his part, Alex Salmond urged Mr Darling to accept that Scotland could be a prosperous independent country. Again and again he asked him to say if he agreed. The audience showed its irritation on occasions when the two men seemed to be dodging questions. It remains to be seen who will be judged the winner.

== Broadcast arrangements ==
The audience for the live broadcast on STV reached a peak audience of 920,000, while averaging 765,000 across its two-hour duration. STV said the programme attracted 36% of viewers in Scotland, the highest rating for a political debate in the country for more than 10 years.

The debate was not broadcast live on television elsewhere in the United Kingdom, as STV refused requests to simulcast it on the BBC News Channel and Sky News. STV did make the debate available as live to its network partner ITV, but they only opted to show it in areas where people were eligible to vote in the referendum (the Scottish part of the ITV Border region). The debate was shown live on the STV Player internet service, but the debate's live streaming broke down under "unprecedented demand". STV apologised for the interruption to its service. The debate was broadcast as live on the BBC Parliament channel the following day.

== See also ==
- United Kingdom general election debates, 2010
- 2014 Scottish independence referendum
