= Crossfire (1961 TV programme) =

- Genre: Current affairs, politics (regional)
- Presented by: Various, including Ray Perman, Anne MacKenzie, Joan Ingram, Michael Crow
- Country of origin: Scotland

Production
- Running time: 30 minutes
- Production company: Grampian Television

Original release
- Network: Grampian Television, Scottish Television
- Release: 27 January 1984 – 2003

Related
- Politics Now

Crossfire is a Scottish regional television current affairs programme produced and broadcast by Grampian Television between 1984 and 2004 and was the successor to the long-running Points North series, broadcast between 1961 and 1983.

The series was first started on Friday 27 January 1984 as Grampian new fortnightly current affairs series which covered political, business and social issues concerning the northern Scotland region. From Friday 11 October 1985 the series become weekly

The Series was moved to new regular live Thursday slot from Thursday 12 October 1989 To give a live feed as part of House of common having camara for the first time, plus to give instant reaction to ongoing events.

When Scottish Television brought over Grampian Television Crossfire was revised to broadcast 6 months of the year while Scottish Television current affair series Platform covered the remaining six months from 1999 and until 2003.

The programme was axed in 2003 to make way for a new political programme entitled Politics Now, co-produced by Scottish and Grampian (now STV Central and STV North respectively).

== Presenters ==
- Bill Mackenzie (1984-1988)
- Ray Perman (1984-1986)
- Anne MacKenzie (1987–95)
- Quentin MacFarlane (1987)
- Stephanie Davies (1995-1996)
- Joan Ingram (1996–99)
- Michael Crow (1999-2003)
