= John MacKay (journalist) =

Scottish broadcast journalist, television presenter, producer and writer

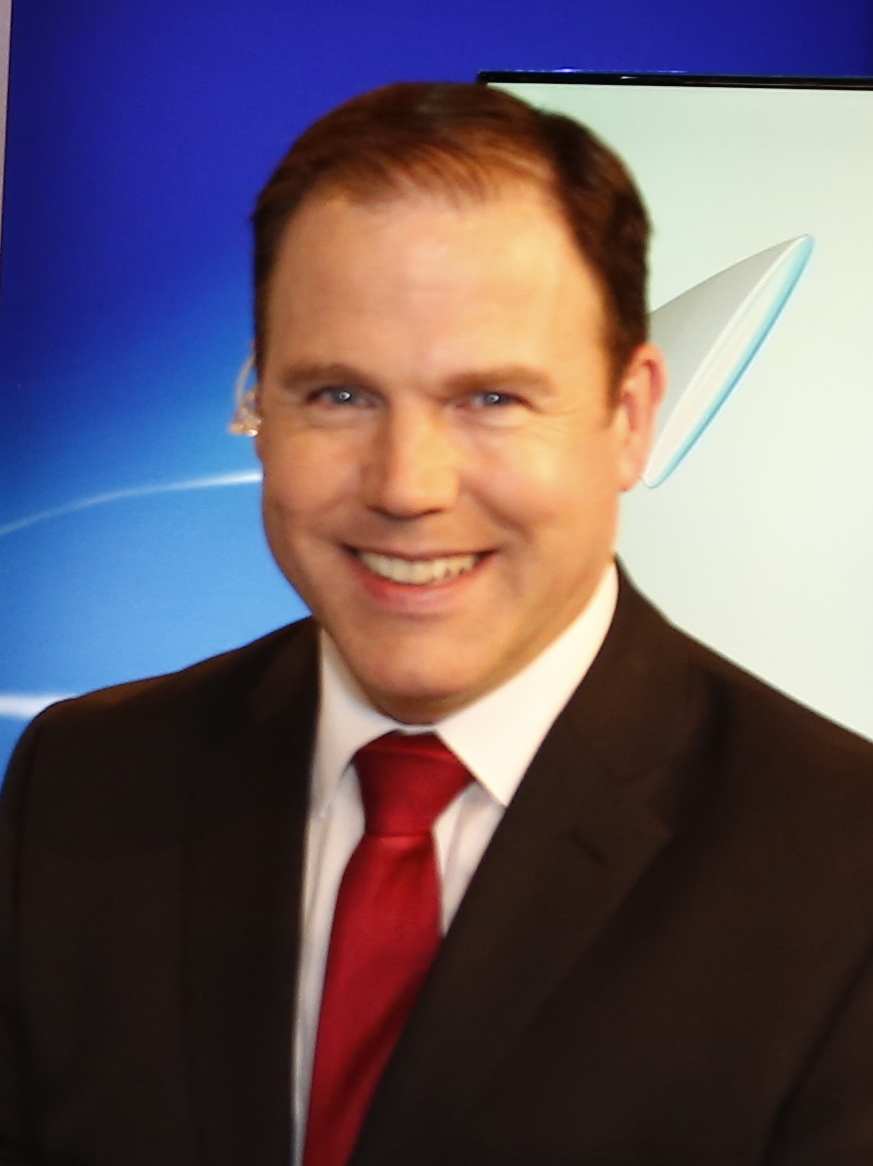
- MacKay on set of STV News at Six, 2015
- Born: John MacKay; 13 September 1966 (age 59); Glasgow, Scotland
- Education: University of Glasgow
- Occupations: Broadcaster, journalist, producer
- Years active: 1987–present
- Employer(s): BBC (1987–1994); STV (1994–2026)
- Children: 2

John MacKay (born 13 September 1966) is a Scottish broadcast journalist, television presenter, producer and writer. He was a main anchor for the STV News in Central Scotland and the current affairs programme Scotland Tonight until his retirement from the broadcaster in March 2026. Born and raised in Glasgow, MacKay attended the University of Glasgow, where he was an editor for the Glasgow University Guardian. He began his career at The Sunday Post newspaper, before trialling for Radio Clyde and later joining BBC Radio Scotland. MacKay joined STV in 1994 as a presenter and reporter for Scotland Today.

Over the course of Mackay's career in journalism, he covered some of the highest profile stories in Scotland, including the 1996 Dunblane Primary School massacre and the 2014 Scottish independence referendum. Mackay released the book, Scotland Today and Yesterday in 2024 which chronologies his recollection of reporting on Scotland's most prolific news stories.

== Early life ==
John MacKay was born on 13 September 1966 in Glasgow, the son of an aero engineer. His family are from the Isle of Lewis in the western isles of Scotland. MacKay grew up in the outskirts of Glasgow in Hillington and attended Penilee Secondary School. He studied politics at the University of Glasgow, where MacKay was an editor of the Glasgow University Guardian.

== Career ==
=== Early career ===
MacKay began his journalism career with The Sunday Post in 1986. He trialled as a radio presenter for Radio Clyde, however, he was later told he “didn't have a voice for broadcast”. After a year at the Post, MacKay left to be a print reporter.

=== BBC Scotland (1987–1994) ===
In 1987, MacKay joined BBC Scotland, initially as a news trainee for Radio Scotland and later as a reporter, presenter and producer for radio and television services, including the national news programme Reporting Scotland. He also worked as a sports correspondent. sub-editor and duty editor.

=== STV (1994–2026) ===
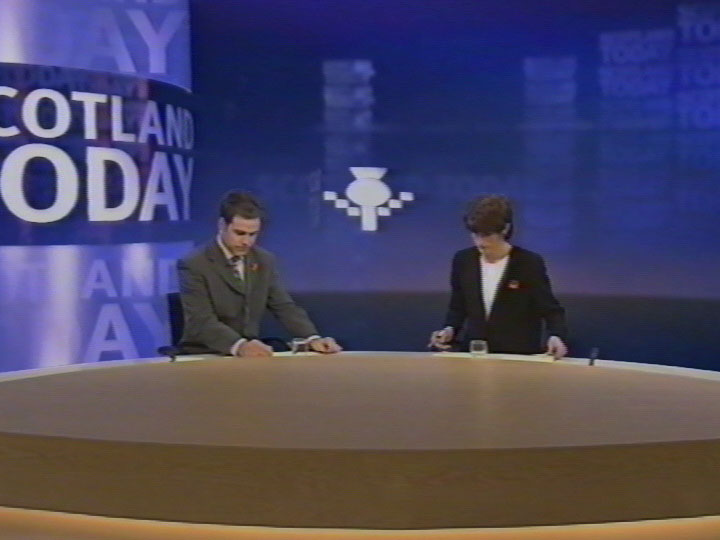
MacKay presenting Scotland Today, alongside Louise White. August 1994

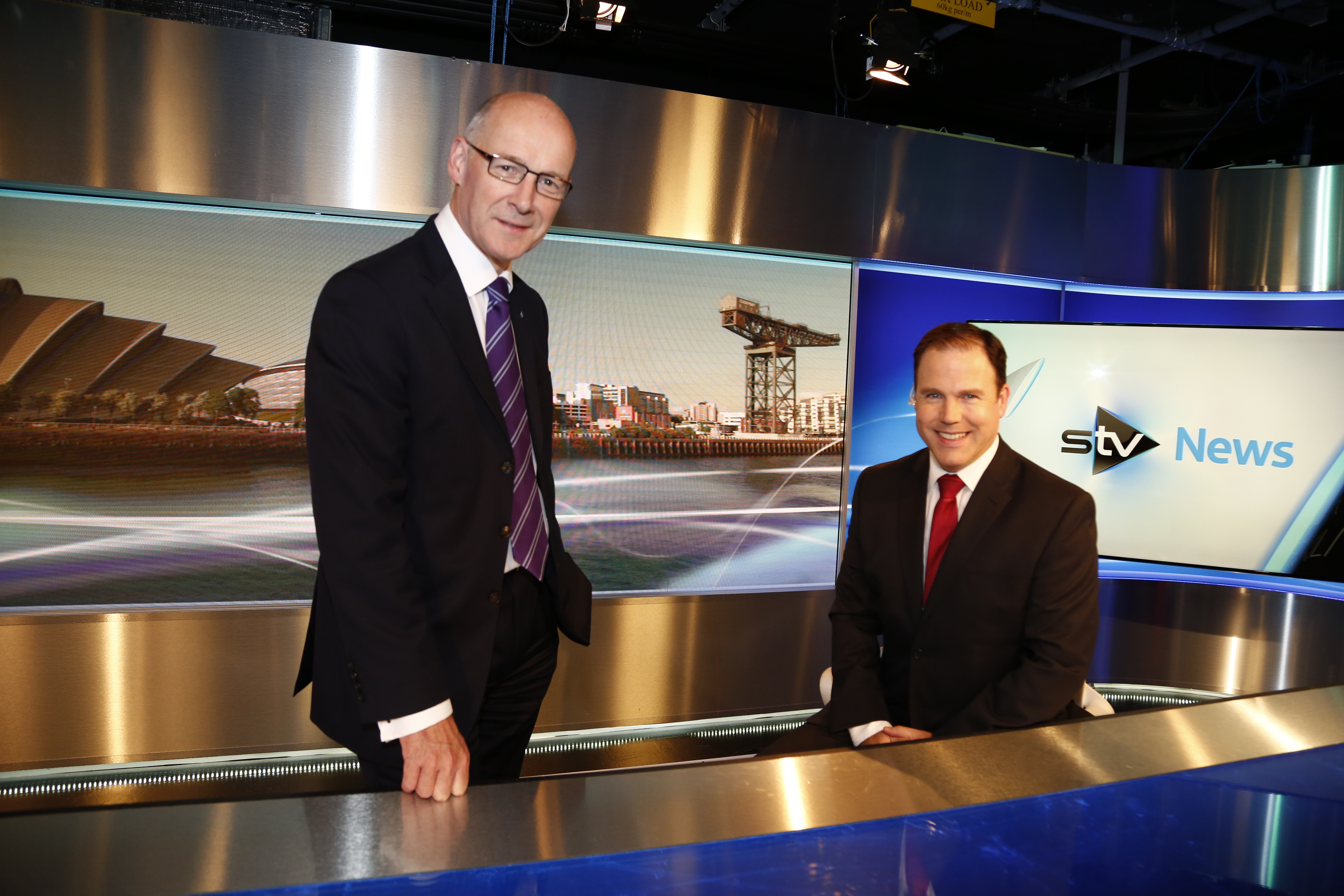
MacKay with Deputy First Minister John Swinney, August 2015

He joined Scottish Television (now STV Central) in September 1994 as a reporter and presenter for the regional news programme Scotland Today and became a main anchor four years later, alongside Shereen Nanjiani. In 2006, Scotland Today was rebranded as the STV News at Six. MacKay served as the sole chief anchor and presented the main 6pm programme for Glasgow and the West and the lunchtime bulletin for the Central Scotland region. In October 2011, he became a presenter of STV's current affairs programme, Scotland Tonight, with MacKay presenting on alternate nights with Rona Dougall.

MacKay has also presented and produced non-news programming for STV including the one-off documentary Sir Alex Ferguson: How to Win Games and Influence People and online content including the popular video blog The Real MacKay and the feature series Diary of a Pipe Band.

In September 2018, STV announced it would merge its Glasgow and Edinburgh-based news programmes and relaunch a Central Scotland edition of STV News at Six, co-anchored by MacKay in Glasgow and Kelly Ann Woodland in Edinburgh.

In April 2020, amid the COVID-19 pandemic, MacKay was furloughed by STV and took a break from presenting both STV News at Six and Scotland Tonight'. MacKay and Kelly Ann Woodland returned to co-presenting the six o'clock news for Central Scotland in September 2020 In October 2024, the programme reverted to a single-anchor format with MacKay presenting from Wednesday to Friday.

On 30 October 2025, MacKay announced he would be leaving STV in March 2026 to concentrate on his writing and other creative ventures. Mackay's final news broadcast for STV was on Friday 13 March 2026, bringing an end to his 32 year career with STV.

=== Literature ===
Of Hebridean descent, from the district of Carloway, MacKay has written three books all based in the Isle of Lewis. They are the best selling "The Road Dance", "Heartland" and "The Last of the Line" (all Luath Press, 2002, 2004 and 2006 respectively). In May 2022, The Road Dance book was produced as a film of the same name, starring Hermione Corfield as Kirsty Macleod.

In 2015, MacKay published "Notes of a Newsman", written about his journey as a news journalist and his news coverage of the Lockerbie bombing, the opening of the Scottish Parliament and the 2014 Scottish Independence Referendum. He published his fifth book, "Home", in 2021.

An updated version of "Notes of a Newsman", entitled "Scotland Today and Yesterday", was published in December 2024.

== Popular culture ==
MacKay is a well-known figure in Scotland, particularly in the central belt through his long association with STV. He was portrayed by comedian Jonathan Watson on his sketch show Only an Excuse with the use of his popular opening catchphrase "I'm John MacKay". The Glasgow-based comedian Kevin Bridges has also stated his admiration for MacKay, saying the highlight of his career was saying "Back to John in the studio."

MacKay has also interviewed fictional anchorman Ron Burgundy (played by Will Ferrell) from the 2004 comedy film Anchorman, though MacKay admitted Ferrell did not do the interview in character.

== Personal life ==
MacKay lives in Renfrewshire with his wife Jo. They have two sons.

== Publications ==
- MacKay, John (2002). The Road Dance. LuathPress. ISBN 9781910021934.
- MacKay, John (2004). Heartland. LuathPress. ISBN 9781910021903.
- MacKay, John (2006). Last of the Line. LuathPress. ISBN 9781910021910.
- MacKay, John (2015). Notes of a Newsman: Witness to a Changing Scotland. LuathPress. ISBN 9781910745045.
- MacKay, John (2021). Home. LuathPress. ISBN 9781910022405.
