= Andrew Anderson (journalist) =

Scottish broadcast journalist

Andrew Anderson is a Scottish broadcast journalist.

Educated at Craigmount High School, Edinburgh; University of Stirling and Centre for Journalism Studies, University College, Cardiff.

Anderson joined Grampian Television (now STV North) in February 1988 as a reporter and presenter of the nightly regional news programme North Tonight.

He left Grampian in October 1992 to join Reuters Television as a Scotland correspondent for the then new GMTV breakfast franchise.

Anderson was a reporter for BBC Scotland in Aberdeen and Dundee from 1997 to 2022.
