= Dail Mòr =

Hamlet in Scotland

- Dalmore
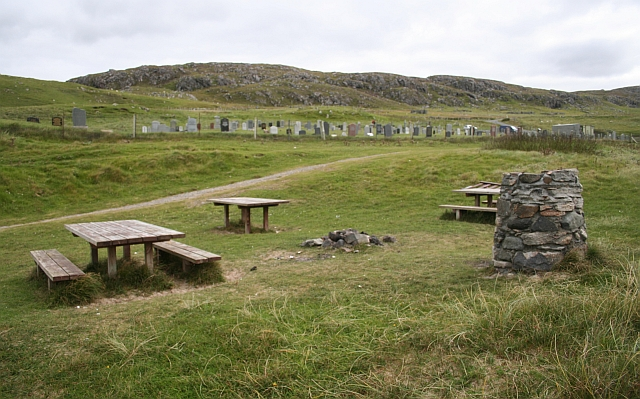

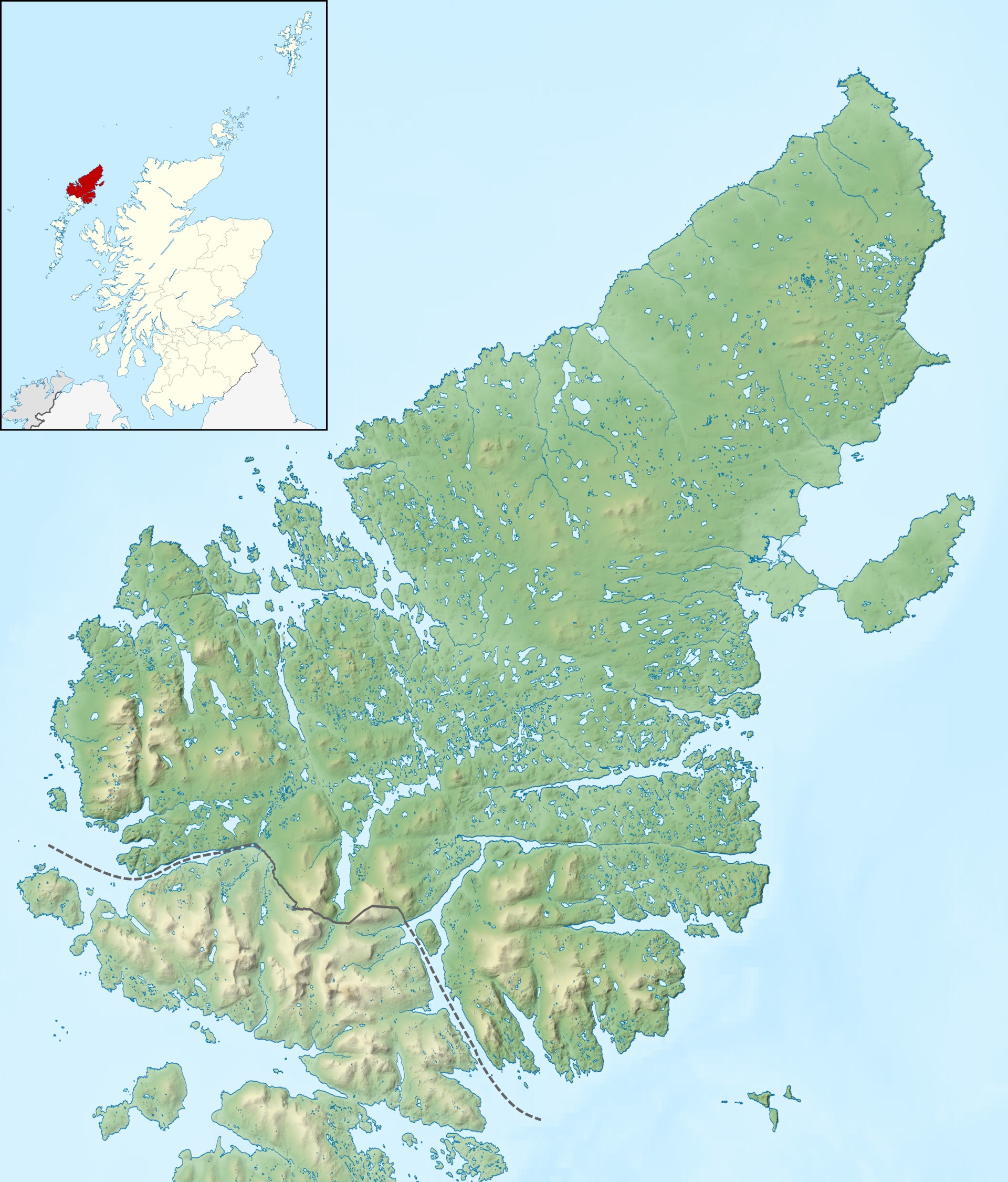
- Shown on Lewis Shown within Scotland
- 58.302778°N 6.75°W
- Type: Beach
- Location: Isle of Lewis
- Region: Scotland

History
- Built: Bronze Age

Site notes
- Excavation dates: 1982
- Archaeologists: Gerald Ponting, Margaret Ponting
- Public access: Yes

Dail Mòr (or Dalmore) is a hamlet situated in the Northside of Carloway, a major settlement on the Isle of Lewis in Scotland. The hamlet has a beach and a cemetery. A small well kept car park is available for visitors as are picnic and public BBQ facilities. The beach is a known surf destination mentioned in numerous guidebooks. Note there is a strong rip current at the north end of the beach.

Despite its remoteness, five of the six houses in the village were connected to fibre broadband in November 2012.

In August 2016, the Transocean Winner oil rig ran aground, on a headland just off Dalmore beach. The oil rig was being towed from Norway to Malta, when it became detached from the tug boat.

== Archaeology ==
Excavations were conducted at Dail Mòr in the autumn of 1982 by Gerald and Margaret Ponting when part of the sea wall collapsed near the beach. This was further excavated by Sharples and Curtis. Prehistoric stone structures were found and documented, suggested to be a dwelling, along with various artefacts left in place by Beaker culture with some earlier finds from the Neolithic. These included tools made of bone or antler and pottery. A large number of flints and arrowheads found during excavations and on the beach nearby suggest the area may have been used for a workshop of their manufacture. One noted artefact recovered was the Dalmore bone; a square-sectioned 34mm with perforation. Zig-zag markings just over 5mm apart on the bone were analysed by P.J. Scott and Margaret Ponting.

Later analysis of the stone tools found that majority of the arrowheads were of quartz type not found locally. The nearest known source is in Shieldaig in Wester Ross, at least 100 km away, in a direct line. This has led the archaeologists to surmise that there was a trade network between the Western Isles and the mainland for some quartz materials - there are local quartz materials on Lewis but they are not as fined grained.

== Images ==
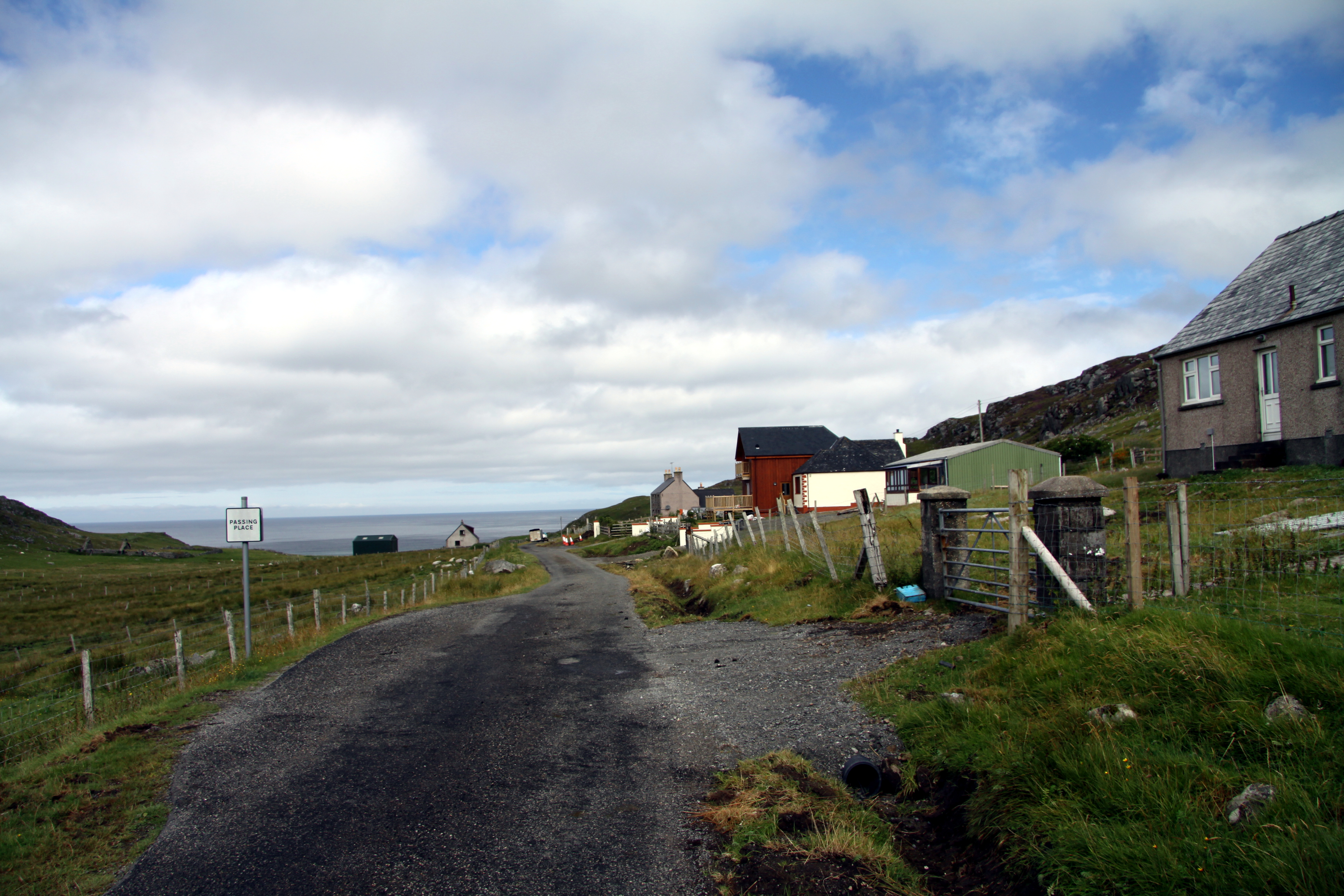
Dail Mor

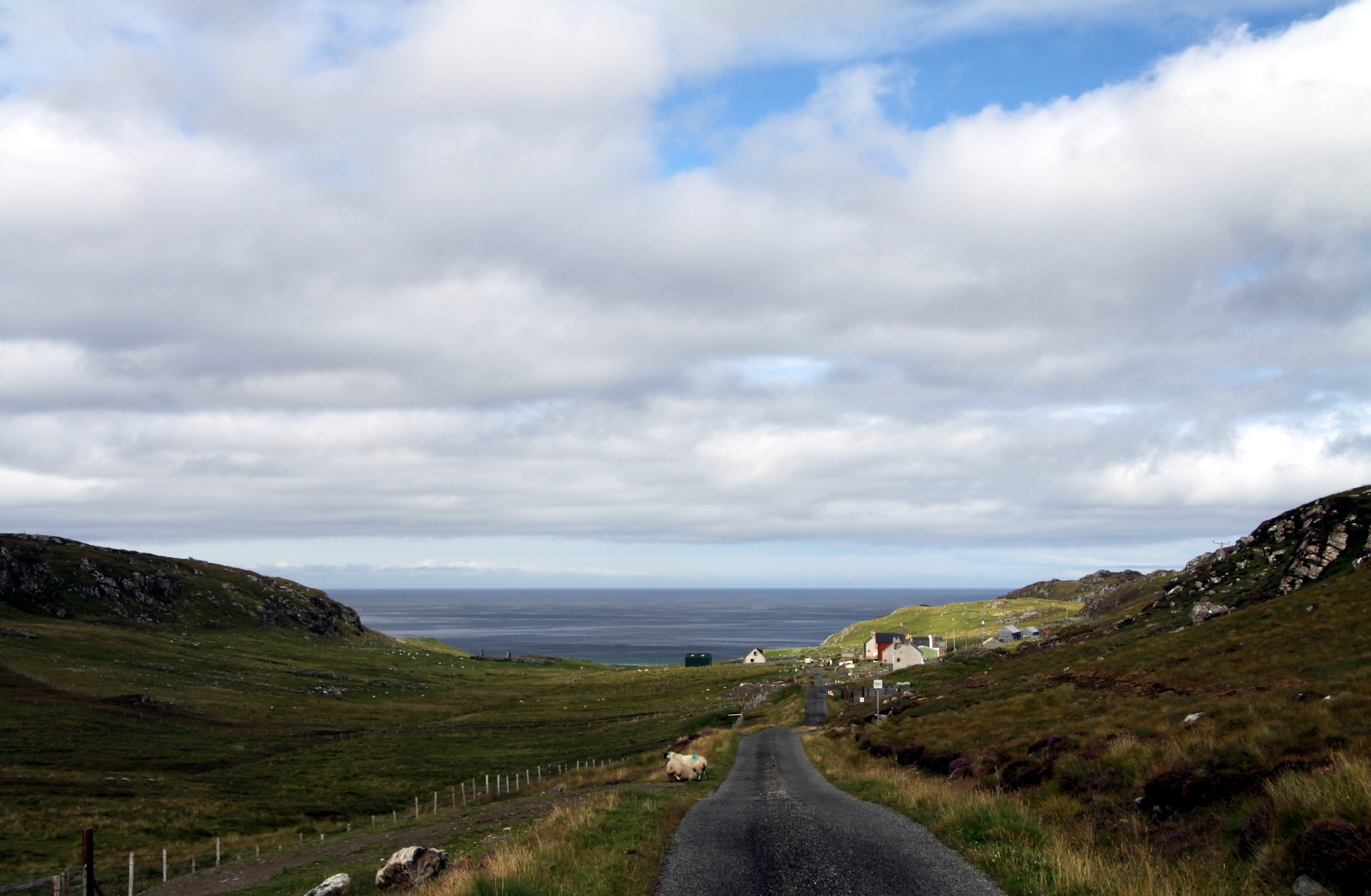
Dail Mor

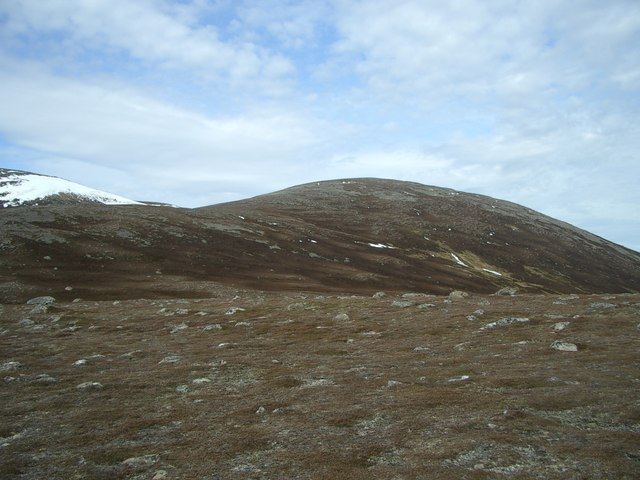
Creag an Dail Mor from Carn Eag Dubh
