= Ross Govans =

Ross Govans is a reporter and news editor for the Northern Scotland edition of STV News at Six. He is also an occasional stand-in newsreader on short STV News bulletins for the region.

Before joining STV North (previously Grampian Television) in 2004, Govans was a journalist at Northsound Radio for ten years.
