= Jo Farrow =

British broadcast meteorologist

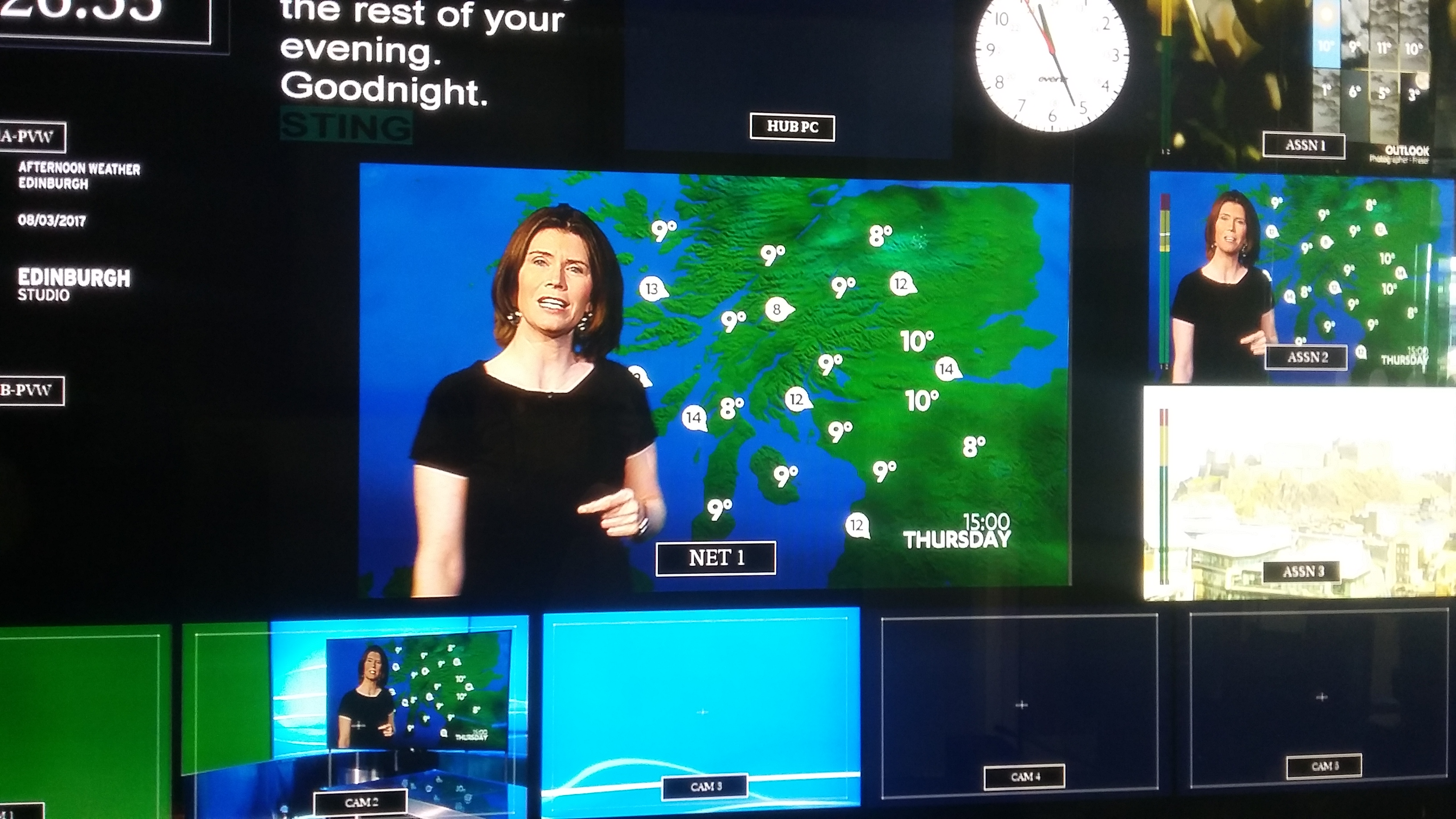
- Jo Farrow in action on STV (2017)
- Presenting career
- Show: STV News
- Station: STV
- Style: Weather forecaster
- Country: Scotland
- Previous show: BBC Weather

Jo Farrow is a British broadcast meteorologist.

A Met Office forecaster since 1997, Farrow has worked for BBC News 24, BBC Radio 4 and BBC Nations and Regions. Farrow has also worked with the ITV Weather team, providing graphics for ITV's own National Weather forecasts, S4C and UTV.

Farrow is now a relief stand-in weather forecaster for STV, previously producing forecasts from STV North's studios in West Tullos, Aberdeen but is now based in the Edinburgh Studios. She also works for Netweather.tv as an online weather forecaster.
