= Norman Macleod (journalist) =

Scottish STV North news presenter and journalist

- Born: circa 1967
- Presenting career
- Show: STV News at Six (North)
- Station: STV
- Time slot: 1800-1830 (Monday-Tuesday/Wednesday)
- Style: News anchor
- Country: Scotland
- Previous show: North Tonight (1990-2009)

Norman Macleod (Scottish Gaelic: Tormod Mac Leòid) (born circa 1967) is a journalist and broadcaster, best known as the former long-serving anchor for Grampian Television, and latterly, the Northern Scotland edition of STV News at Six.

A Gaelic-speaker from Scalpay, Harris on the Outer Hebrides, Macleod worked part-time at two BBC local radio stations, one in Stornoway and the other in Aberdeen, whilst at college. Upon completing his studies, he joined Grampian Television (now STV North) as a bilingual trainee in 1987 and later joined the North Tonight team as a reporter and newsreader. Following a major revamp of the nightly news programme in 2006, he became the programme's chief solo anchor, a duty he shares with Andrea Brymer.

Macleod has previously presented and produced some of STV's Gaelic-language programming and the station's online video blog Northern Exposure.

On 8 July 2026, Macleod announced his departure from STV after 39 years as a presenter and reporter, ahead of the end of separate news programming for the North of Scotland.

He presented his final edition of STV News at Six from the Aberdeen studios on Friday 10 July 2026.
