= Rona Dougall =

Scottish broadcast journalist and television presenter

- Born: 21 July 1966 (age 60)
- Education: Lenzie Academy; University of Edinburgh
- Occupations: Broadcaster, journalist
- Employer(s): STV (2011–present); Sky News (1996–2011); Radio Forth
- Notable work: Scotland Tonight; Sky News
- Spouse: David Halliday
- Children: 2

Rona Dougall is a Scottish broadcast journalist and television presenter. She currently acts as a main anchor on STV's current affairs programme, Scotland Tonight.

Brought up in Lenzie, East Dunbartonshire, she attended Lenzie Academy, before graduating from the University of Edinburgh. Her broadcasting career began at Radio Forth. She then went on to become Scotland Correspondent at Sky News for over fifteen years, before being made redundant in 2011.

Three weeks after being made redundant from Sky, STV bosses offered Dougall a job as a co-anchor on the soon-to-be launched Scotland Tonight, after she spotted a post on the Facebook page of STV News anchor John MacKay.

She said: "John is a friend on Facebook and a couple of months ago he posted about this great new current affairs programme on STV. The show sounded right up my street and I phoned to see if they needed a reporter. They asked if I would be interested in presenting from the studio. I did a screen test and they offered me the job."

Dougall first presented on the programme's second edition, on 25 October 2011, interviewing then-First Minister of Scotland, Alex Salmond. She usually presents the programme on Wednesday and Thursday nights, and fills in on other editions in the absence of MacKay.

Dougall is married to David Halliday, and the couple have two daughters. She lives in Newington, Edinburgh.
