= Garenin =

Coordinates: 58.296°N 6.792°W

Garenin: Scottish Gaelic: Na Gearrannan
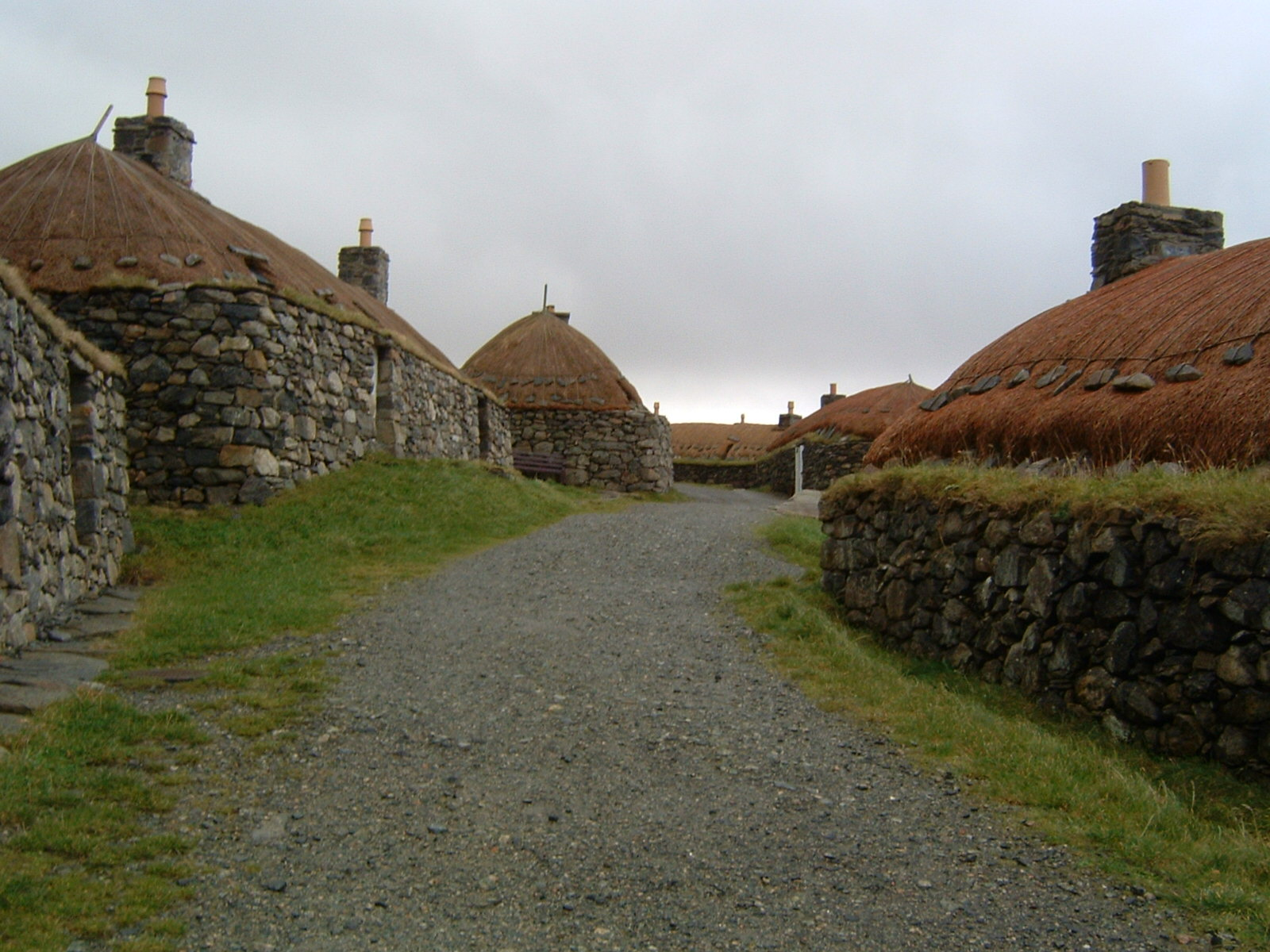
- Garenin Blackhouse Village

- Location within the Outer Hebrides
- Language: Scottish Gaelic; English
- OS grid reference: NB192441
- Civil parish: Uig
- Council area: Na h-Eileanan Siar
- Lieutenancy area: Western Isles
- Country: Scotland
- Sovereign state: United Kingdom
- Post town: ISLE OF LEWIS
- Postcode district: HS2
- Dialling code: 01851
- Police: Scotland
- Fire: Scottish
- Ambulance: Scottish
- UK Parliament: Na h-Eileanan an Iar
- Scottish Parliament: Na h-Eileanan an Iar

Garenin (Scottish Gaelic: Na Gearrannan) is a crofting township on the west coast of the Isle of Lewis in the Outer Hebrides of Scotland. Garenin is in the Carloway municipality and has a population of about 80 people. It is also within the parish of Uig. Today, the village is most famous for the "blackhouse village", which consists of nine restored traditional thatched cottages. The village is found at the end of the Garenin road beside the village bay. These houses were lived in until 1974 and were the last group of blackhouses to be inhabited in the Western Isles. Piped water was not available in the village until the 1960s.

In 1989, Urras nan Geàrrannan (The Garenin Trust) was established by the Western Isles Council to restore the houses. Over a decade later, on 5 June 2001, the project was complete and the restored village was opened by Princess Anne.

The village is managed by Gearrannan Village Ltd. There was a youth hostel (opened by Magnus Magnusson on 3 July 1991; managed by The Gatliff Trust), but this closed in May 2011. There are four self-catering cottages, a museum (a blackhouse set in 1955, three years after electricity arrived on the island) and a resource centre; a café and a small gift shop are open in summer.

The film The Road Dance was filmed there in 2020.

== Gallery ==
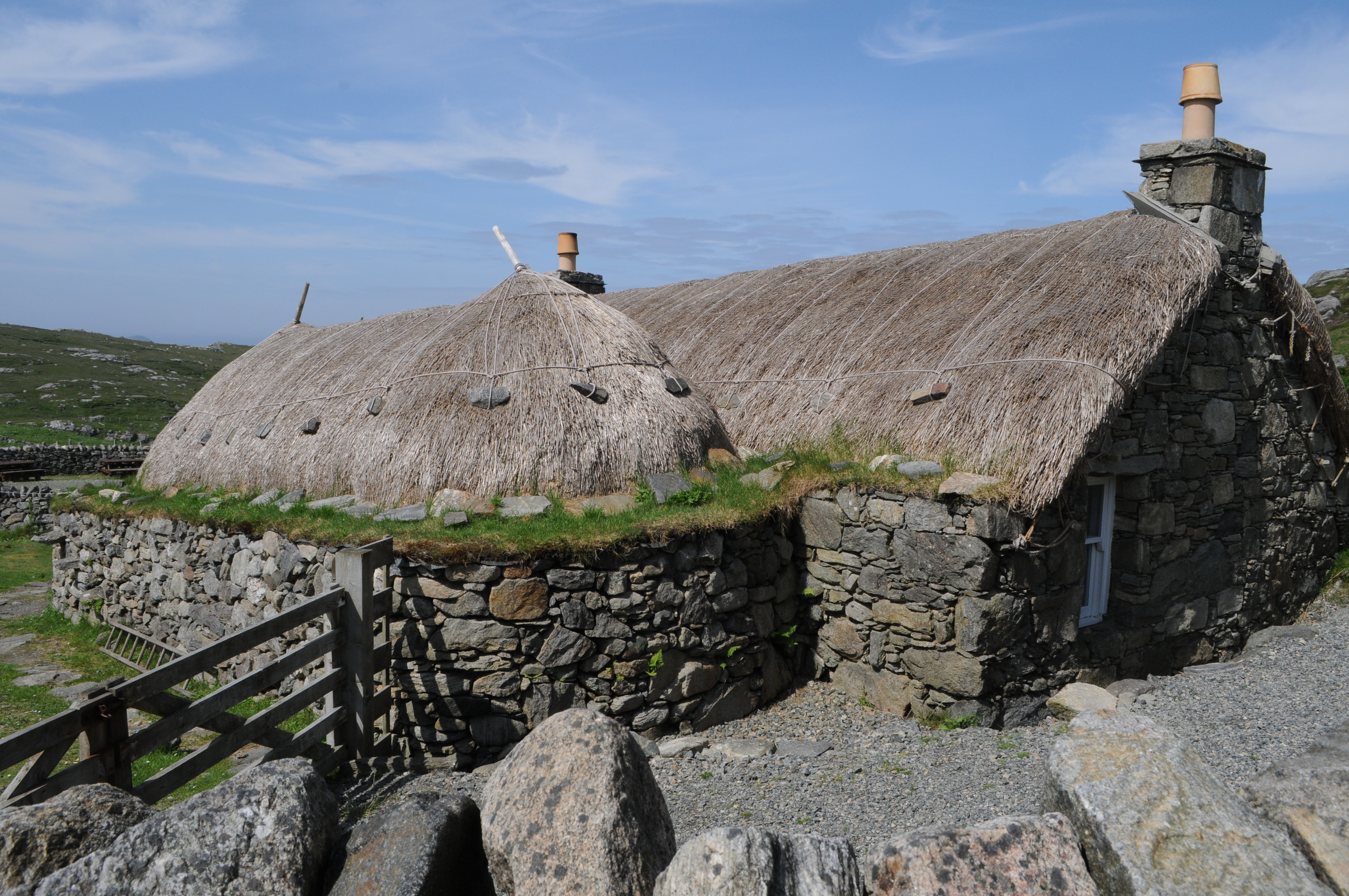

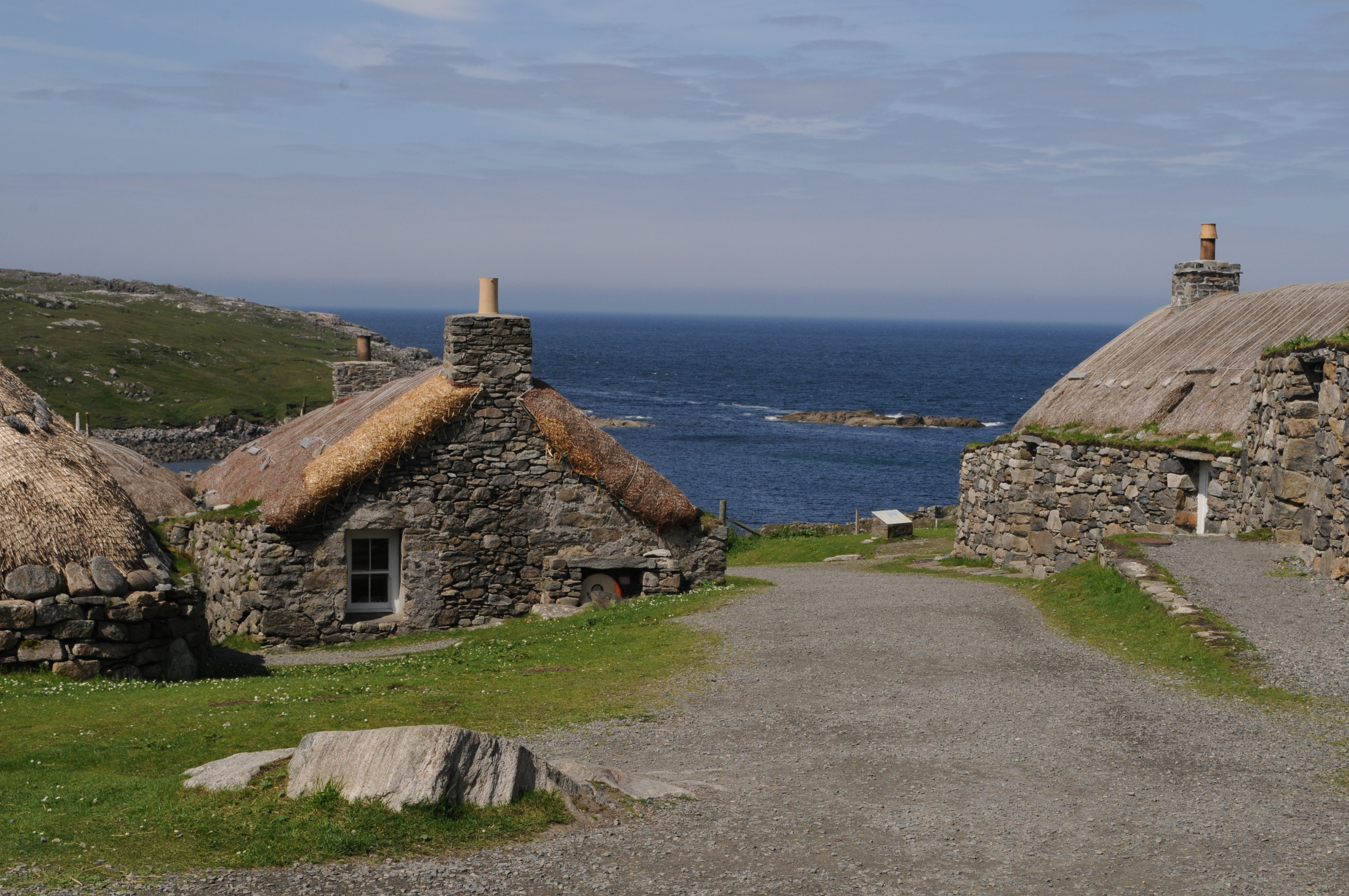

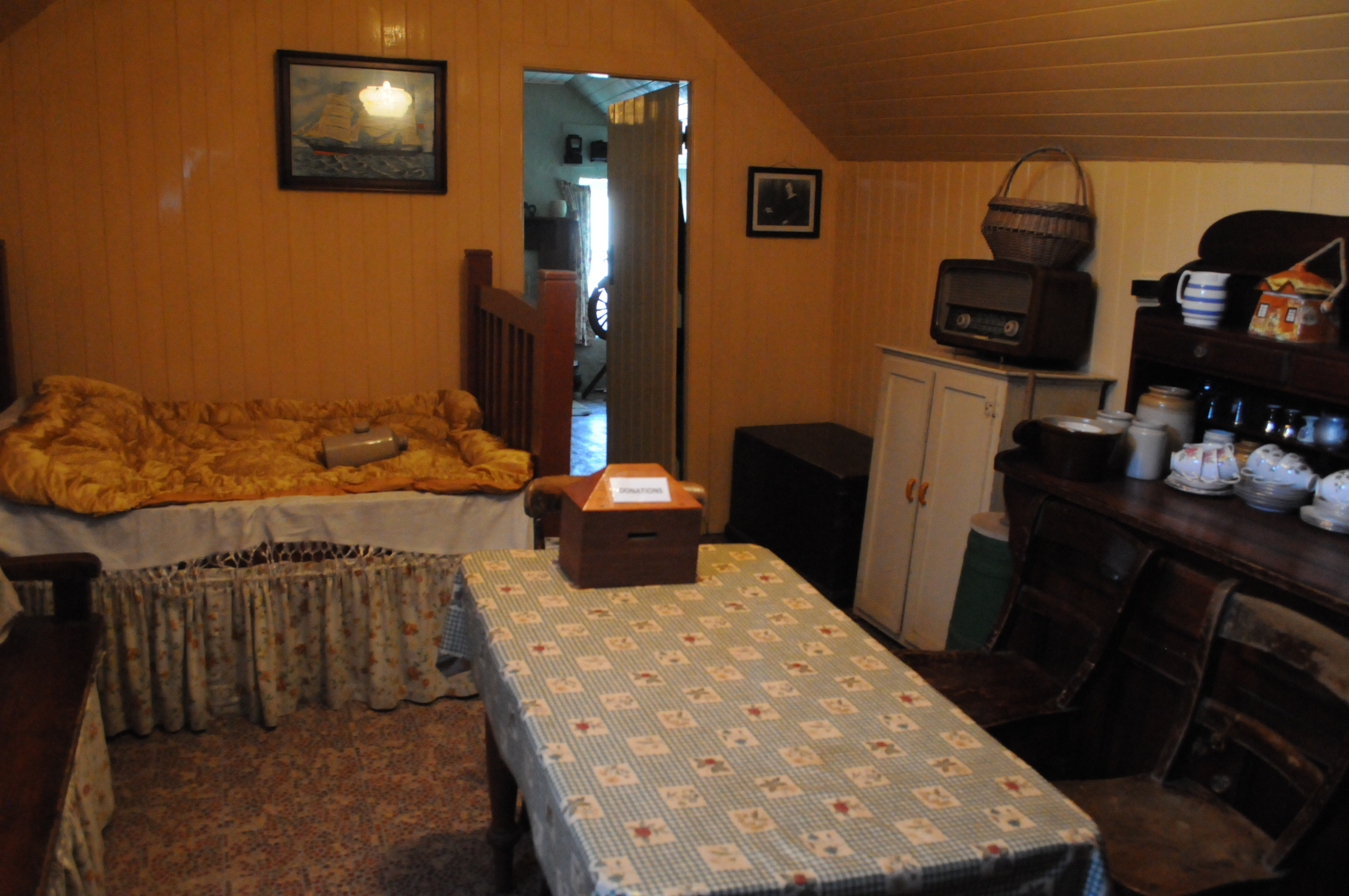
