= Andrea Brymer =

Scottish television presenter

- Spouse: Alan Ronald (m. 1998)
- Children: 1
- Presenting career
- Show: STV News at Six (North)
- Station: STV
- Style: News anchor
- Country: Scotland
- Previous shows: Scotland Today (1994-2002); North Tonight (2002-2009)

Andrea Brymer is a Scottish television presenter who is one of the main anchors of STV News at Six.

== Career ==
Brymer's television career started at Scottish Television (STV Central) in 1994 where she worked as a news assistant before becoming a features reporter on the lunchtime edition of Scotland Today, before moving onto presenting the main evening edition of the programme.

Brymer moved to Grampian Television (now STV North) in Aberdeen in 2002, to become a reporter but soon began co-presenting North Tonight. Following a major revamp of the nightly news programme in 2006, she became the programme's chief solo anchor, a duty she shares with Norman Macleod.

During her time at STV, Andrea has been one of the two main presenters chosen to co-host live pan-Scottish programmes on major stories. These include two Scottish elections, the North Sea helicopter crash in 2009, which killed 16 men and the Pope's visit to Scotland in 2010.

== Personal life ==
Brymer has been married to Alan Ronald, an oil worker, since 1998. They live in Aberdeen with their son.
