= Politics Now =

Scottish television series, 2004–2011

- Title
- Genre: Politics
- Directed by: John Mason, Laura Trimble
- Presented by: Bernard Ponsonby
- Starring: David Torrance (reporter)
- Theme music composer: Paul Leonard-Morgan
- Country of origin: Scotland
- Original language: English

Production
- Executive producer: Gordon McMillan
- Producer: Stephen Townsend
- Production locations: Glasgow, Scotland
- Cinematography: Colin Matheson, James McLaughlin
- Running time: 30 min(2009-11); 45min(2004-09)
- Production company: STV News

Original release
- Network: STV
- Release: 8 January 2004 – 30 June 2011

Related
- Crossfire (1984-2004); Platform (1996-2004); The Week In Politics; Scotland Tonight (2011 –); STV News at Six

Politics Now is a Scottish political programme produced and broadcast by STV in northern and central Scotland, between 2004 and 2011. The programme, broadcast for 40 weeks of the year on Thursday evenings after the late STV News bulletin, covered all of the major political developments in Westminster, Brussels and Holyrood in detail.

The programme was presented by STV's political editor Bernard Ponsonby, with featured reports and contributions from the rest of STV's political unit - Westminster correspondent Harry Smith, political correspondent Jamie Livingstone and freelance reporter David Torrance. The programme was originally presented by former political correspondent Michael Crow until his departure from the station in January 2009.

The series was replaced in 2011 by Scotland Tonight, which was broadcast from Monday to Thursday on STV covering current affairs and politics.

== History ==
Prior to the creation of Politics Now, the political programmes were:

- Platform: Scottish Television's flagship political programme, presented by Bernard Ponsonby and Michael Crow. The series started in June 1996 as a replacement for Scottish Questions.
- Crossfire: Grampain Television's flagship political programme, which started in 1984.

In June 1997, Scottish Television acquired Grampian Television, and from 1999, it was decided to broadcast both series on Scottish and Grampian, with Platform covering the first six months of the year, with Crossfire covering rest of the year. STV believed this would ensure viewers in both the central belt and the north of Scotland being aware of the issues which affect each part of Scotland. In addition The Week in Politics, a weekly digest of the events of the Scottish Parliament which focuses on the work of the radical committee system in the Scottish Parliament, was introduced in 1999, to complement the two programmes.

Both achieved strong ratings, regularly attracting double the number of viewers of Newsnight Scotland.

== Creation ==
During 2003, it became clear the Scottish political landscape had changed both fundamentally and dramatically. To better reflect the changes, it was decided to overhaul the stations' political programming into a single flagship series broadcasting 40 weeks a year in a 45-minute slot, with production bases in Aberdeen, Glasgow and Edinburgh, and correspondents in London and Brussels. For 22 weeks of the year, the programme came from Grampian TV's new studio in Aberdeen.

Politics Now set, used since 2011

A Grampian TV spokesperson said "Our existing programmes, Crossfire and The Week in Politics, have served us well and have given Grampian TV significant profile in the political community. However, we believe we are now in a position to offer our viewers an even better service. Politics Now will be a brand new political programme."

The head of News and Current Affairs at Scottish TV, Paul McKinney, said: "Politics Now will aim to bring a fresh perspective on political developments across Scotland, as well as tackling issues of significance at Westminster and inside the European Union. This is an exciting development for Scottish and Grampian TV. The new programme demonstrates our commitment to in depth political coverage. We hope that Politics Now will become essential viewing for anyone interested in the politics and future of our country. We also hope to bring new viewers to political programming with an innovative and accessible approach to the reporting and discussion of all the big political stories that matter across Scotland."

== Axing ==
On 25 August 2011, STV announced plans to introduce a 30-minute current affairs programme, Scotland Tonight, on Monday through Thursday nights at 10:30 pm. The pan-regional programme, incorporating late news bulletins for STV's regions, began on Monday 24 October 2011, replacing Politics Now in its Thursday night slot.

Politics Now was broadcast from STV's headquarters at Pacific Quay in Glasgow, sharing the same set as the west opt-out on STV News at Six. Prior to 2005, the programme was broadcast from STV's former headquarters at Cowcaddens, Glasgow, and the studios of Grampian Television (now STV North) in West Tullos, Aberdeen.
