= Bernard Ponsonby =

Scottish journalist and politician

- Born: Castlemilk, Scotland
- Occupation: Broadcast journalist
- Known for: STV News, Scotland Tonight

Bernard Ponsonby is a Scottish broadcast journalist. He worked in news and current affairs programming for STV from 1990 and was appointed political editor in 2000. From 2019 to 2024, Ponsonby was special correspondent for STV News.

== Early life ==
Ponsonby was born in Castlemilk, Glasgow. He was educated at Trinity High School, Rutherglen, and Strathclyde University. He has been a supporter of Celtic F.C. since boyhood.

== Political career ==
Ponsonby joined the Social Democratic Party (SDP) as a young man, and upon leaving university was briefly employed as a researcher for the former MP Dr Dickson Mabon. After the SDP merged with the Liberal Party in 1988, he stood for the Liberal Democrats – then styled as the "Democrats" – in that year's Govan by-election, losing his deposit with 4.1% share of the vote. Following that he became the party's press officer in Scotland.

== Television career ==
Ponsonby joined Scottish Television (STV) in 1990. For seven years, he presented the channel's flagship political programme Platform. He currently reports and provides political commentary for all three editions of the station's flagship news programme, STV News at Six, in the North, East and West of Scotland. He has also contributed to the weekly political programme Politics Now, for which he became presenter in January 2009, until the programme's end in 2011. He now commentates on the replacement programme Scotland Tonight.

Ponsonby co-presented the political programme Scottish Questions (1992–93), was the lead presenter on Scottish Voices (1994–95), co-presented Trial By Night (1993–96) and Seven Days (2000–2001).

Ponsonby has produced several documentary programmes in the Scottish Reporters series and produced two political documentaries (The Dewar Years and The Salmond Years) on two of Scotland's most influential politicians of the postwar period.

He was appointed political editor of STV in 2000, following the retirement of longstanding political editor Fiona Ross.

In 2002, Ponsonby was arrested for drunk driving and convicted of being over three times the legal drink limit.

In May 2009, Ponsonby became the first journalist in the UK to report the resignation of the speaker of the House of Commons and Glasgow North East MP, Michael Martin – the first speaker to be forced from office since 1695.

On 5 August 2014, Ponsonby moderated Salmond & Darling: The Debate, the first head-to-head televised debate between First Minister Alex Salmond and Alistair Darling ahead of the Scottish independence referendum.

The Prime Minister's office refused to allow Ponsonby to interview David Cameron on STV about the Scottish independence referendum.

Ponsonby stood down as political editor of STV News in 2019, after 19 years in the job. He took up the newly created role of special correspondent, whilst continuing to lead STV's election results coverage. He left STV in 2024.

He has presented The Ponsonby & Massie Podcast with Alex Massie since 2024.
