= North Tonight =

- Genre: Regional News
- Created by: Grampian Television
- Country of origin: Scotland

Production
- Running time: Main bulletin: 30 minutes Short bulletins: Durations vary
- Production companies: Grampian Television (STV News)

Original release
- Network: Grampian Television (now branded STV)
- Release: 7 January 1980 – 22 March 2009

Related
- STV News at Six; Scotland Today; Politics Now

North Tonight is a former Scottish nightly regional news programme covering the North of Scotland, produced by STV North (formerly Grampian Television).

== History ==
During the late 1960s and 1970s, Grampian's regional news service consisted of daily 10-minute evening bulletins. By 1978, the bulletins had developed into a magazine programme entitled Grampian Today, initially broadcast from Wednesday - Friday before expanding to every weeknight.

The programme was relaunched as North Tonight on Monday 7 January 1980 in an effort to reflect the Northern Scotland region as a whole - its first presenters were John Duncanson and Selina Scott.

The launch of North Tonight coincided with the opening of a new remote-controlled studio at Albany House in Dundee (an event broadcast live on the first programme) and an expansion into Grampian's use of Electronic News Gathering (ENG) cameras. Grampian Today had pioneered the use of such cameras in 1978, allowing the company to extend its flagship news programme to five nights a week. By 1983, a third studio at Inverness (modelled on the Dundee studio) was opened, allowing greater coverage of the Highlands and Islands area.

The early years of North Tonight also coincided with the launch of regular news bulletins at lunchtime (North News) and before station closedown (North Headlines) on weekdays, read by Grampian's team of continuity announcers. Regional news at weekends would not be introduced until 1988, when the bulletins were renamed Grampian Headlines.

Up until the early 1990s, North Tonight was taken off air during the summer months and replaced by a nightly magazine show entitled Summer at Six (later North Tonight: Summer Edition), which also included a short news bulletin.

Significant points in the history of the programme included extensive coverage of the Piper Alpha disaster in 1988 and the resignation of Grampian Police chief constable Dr. Ian Oliver in 1998. North Tonight also covered the murder of Aberdeen schoolboy Scott Simpson in the mid-1990s and the bird flu incident in Cellardyke, Fife in April 2006.

Its predecessor, Grampian Today, had the first live broadcast from an oil platform in the North Sea, as well as the first live broadcast from the summit of Cairn Gorm. During the mid 1990s, North Tonight twice won the BAFTA Scotland award for Best News Programme.

North Tonight live aired from Grampian's main studios at Queens Cross in Aberdeen until the station moved to new, smaller studios in the West Tullos area of the city in 2003. News studios were retained in Dundee and Inverness with political correspondents based at bureaux in Edinburgh and Millbank, Westminster. There was a studio in Stornoway but this closed in 2001.

Contracted freelance correspondents and cameramen provided news coverage from the outer regions of Shetland, Orkney, Caithness and Sutherland. The programme also had the distinction of reporting from the largest geographical region in the ITV network, covering an area the size of Belgium.

On 8 January 2007, viewers of North Tonight began to receive two different programmes - those in the Dundee, Angus, Perthshire and north-east Fife area received a dedicated bulletin within the main North Tonight programme featuring the day's news from the sub-region, presented & produced from STV's studios in Dundee and directed from a technical gallery in Aberdeen.

Originally, the Tayside bulletins were produced from Harbour Chambers in City Quay. As of 28 April 2008, STV News's Tayside operation is now based at upgraded, larger studios at Seabraes. Whilst the Tayside bulletin was broadcast, viewers further north saw more news from the north-east, Highlands and Islands areas, broadcast from the headquarters of STV North in Aberdeen.

On 7 April 2007, it was announced that GMTV had replaced STV as the supplier of early morning regional news bulletins in Scotland. The contract was awarded to the Belfast-based Macmillan Media, which has offices in London and Glasgow. GMTV Scotland (Grampian) began on 3 December 2007. STV, and its northern predecessor Grampian Television had supplied GMTV with its news since the breakfast channel took over from TV-am in 1993. The newsroom produced three bulletins of about three minutes each at 06.35, 07.05 and 08.05. The decision also affected North Today's sister programme, Scotland Today. The contract to provide regional ITV Breakfast in North of Scotland (as well as the STV Central region) returned to STV in 2013.

On 19 June 2007, STV North began producing Northern Exposure, a supplementary video blog, presented and produced by the North Tonight team for the station's website, stv.tv. The blogs, which spawned a spin-off series entitled Ask Kirstin, continued to be produced on a regular basis until June 2009.

On 18 March 2009, it was announced that the North Tonight branding would be phased out as part of a major station revamp. On Monday 23 March 2009, the nightly news programme was relaunched and renamed as STV News at Six. The name is also used in the STV Central region as a replacement for Scotland Today. The last main edition of North Tonight was aired on Friday 20 March 2009.

In July 2026, STV North ended its dedicated regional news programming for the North of Scotland after 65 years. It was replaced with a shared service with the STV Central region and short opt-outs during STV News at Six on weekdays.

== Presenters ==
- Andrew Anderson (1988–1992)
- Andrea Brymer (2003–2009)
- John Duncanson (1980–1998)
- Alan Fisher (1986–1990)
- Pauline Fraser (2000–2007)
- Frank Gilfeather (1980 – mid 1990s)
- Kirstin Gove (1996–2009)
- Chris Harvey (2000–2009)
- Joan Ingram (1983–1997)
- Sarah Mack (1998–2003)
- Anne MacKenzie (1981–1995)
- Norman Macleod (c. 1990 – 2009)
- Anne Scott (mid – late 1990s)
- Selina Scott (1978–1980)
- Tyrone Smith (1998–2009)
- Anna Soubry (1981–1984)
- Isla Traquair (2001–2006)
- Ron Thomson (1966–1991)
- Mark White (1993–1999)
- Alastair Yates (1980–1986)
