= Halla Mohieddeen =

British journalist

- Born: Halla Mohieddeen; 13 October 1979 (age 46); Edinburgh, Scotland
- Spouse: Tommaso Pani
- Presenting career
- Show: STV News Tonight (2017–18) BBC Reporting Scotland (2025–)
- Style: News anchor
- Country: Scotland
- Previous shows: France 24, CCTV; STV2
- Website: www.hallamohieddeen.com

Halla Mohieddeen (born 13 October 1979) is a Scottish journalist, broadcaster and television presenter.

== Biography ==
Mohieddeen was born to a Lebanese father and Scottish mother. She studied Interpreting and Translating at the Heriot-Watt University. She previously presented the Morning News and Middle East Matters programmes for Paris-based 24 hour international news channel, France 24. The Heriot-Watt University graduate from the Scottish Borders has also worked for a number of Chinese TV and radio stations, including CCTV, Xinhua News Network Corporation and Beijing Radio 774. From April 2017 to June 2018, she was the anchor of the nightly Scottish news programme STV News Tonight on STV2. She was a Principal Presenter with Al Jazeera English in Doha.

Mohieddeen is multilingual, fluent in English, French, Mandarin Chinese and German. She also has specialist knowledge of International affairs, Scottish and British politics, Chinese politics and society and marine and environmental conservation.

She lives in Glasgow with her Sardinian-born husband Tommaso Pani.

Mohieddeen joined Sky News in late 2022.

In June 2025, Mohieddeen joined BBC Scotland as a freelance presenter for Reporting Scotland.
