= Ron Thomson =

- Born: 1929; Scotland
- Died: 2004 (aged 74–75); Scotland
- Occupations: Journalist, news anchorman

Ron Thomson MBE (1929 – February 2004) was a Scottish journalist.

Thomson reported for local newspapers including Dundee Courier, Daily Herald, Sunday Mail and Sunday Express.

He was also a reporter and presenter for Grampian Television's regional news programmes (News and Views, Grampian Today, North Tonight) for over 25 years, latterly as a correspondent at Grampian's Dundee newsroom covering Tayside and North East Fife.

He also wrote and presented a number of non-news programmes for the station including On The Road Again and a number of About Britain documentaries for the ITV network.

Thomson was awarded an MBE in 1991 for his services to journalism and after retiring from Grampian in the early 1990s, continued to write weekly columns for the Dundee Courier.

Ron Thomson died in February 2004 after a long illness. He was 74 years old.
