= Kelly-Ann Woodland =

Scottish newsreader and journalist

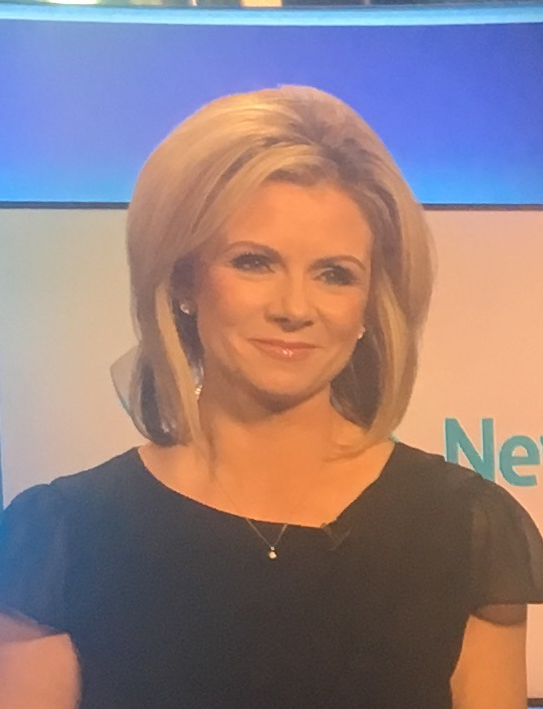
- Woodland in the STV News at Six studio in Edinburgh, 2018
- Born: Kelly-Ann Bishop; 5 November 1980 (age 45); Greenock, Inverclyde, Scotland
- Education: University of Glasgow
- Spouse: Stuart Woodland (m. 2012)
- Children: 2
- Presenting career
- Show: STV News (Central)
- Station: STV
- Style: Newsreader
- Country: Scotland
- Previous show: Scotland Today (2005-2009)
- Website: stv.tv

Kelly-Ann Woodland (née Bishop; 5 November 1981) is a Scottish newsreader and journalist, best known as a main anchor of STV News at Six in Central Scotland.

== Early life ==
Kelly-Ann Bishop was born on 5 November 1981 in Bonhill in the area of Vale of Leven, West Dunbartonshire. She has three siblings; Julie, Nikki and Brian. Woodland was educated at Jamestown Primary School and Vale of Leven Academy. She graduated from University of Glasgow in 2002 with an undergraduate degree in politics and sociology.

== Career ==
=== Career beginnings ===
While still at university Woodland had her first experience in the media industry as a researcher for STV's weekly politics programme Platform. After graduating, Woodland started work at now-defunct commercial radio station Castle Rock FM in Dumbarton as a news reporter and bulletin reader.

She joined STV in 2003 as a news assistant. Woodland was quickly promoted to production journalist and then finally reporter after a few years. From 2010 Woodland, became the regular early morning presenter of STV's opt-out news bulletins for Daybreak and then Good Morning Britain. In recent years, Woodland has become one of STV's main reporters and the stand-in presenter for all of their news programmes including STV News at Six from Glasgow and Edinburgh and the current affairs programme Scotland Tonight.

=== STV News at Six anchor ===
In September 2018, STV relaunched their flagship 6pm news programme for the Central Belt of Scotland. The new format combined the existing Edinburgh and Glasgow programmes into one co-anchored programme that contained sections that contained opt-outs for the East and West regions, mixed with sections that were co-anchored from both locations with links being shared by both presenters. Woodland was chosen to anchor from the Edinburgh studio with John MacKay anchoring from the Glasgow studio.

In October 2024, the programme reverted to a single-anchor format with Woodland presenting on Mondays and Tuesdays.

== Personal life ==
Woodland has been married to Stuart Woodland, who is an STV cameraman, since 2012. They both live in Bonhill with their two children, Mikey and Daniel.

== Lipstick Lounge ==
In 2013, Woodland paired up with celebrity make-up artist Annette Wiseman to launch a new website, Lipstick Lounge. The site features video tutorials on how to do make-up like a pro, while also having interviews with people to share tips and beauty secrets.
