= Gordon Chree =

Scottish reporter

- Born: 10 December 1978 (age 47)
- Presenting career
- Show: STV News (East/West)
- Station: STV
- Time slot: Varies
- Style: Reporter
- Country: Scotland
- Previous shows: Scotland Today (2007-2009); Talk 107 (2006-2007)

Gordon Chree (born 1978) is a Scottish reporter for STV News and occasional presenter on the East edition of STV News at Six, and the online video blog Not The Real MacKay. Chree was one of the live reporters at the Glasgow Airport attack for STV, ITV News, and CNN. Prior to STV, Chree worked for several commercial radio stations, including the now-defunct Edinburgh station Talk 107.

Gordon is a regular at parkrun. In 2023-24 he became the first person to complete all Scottish parkruns in sequence (69 different parkruns in a row). His sequence of consecutive different parkruns sits at 89 (as of 10 August 2024).
