= STV News =

Scottish TV programme

- Also known as: STV News at Six; Good Morning Scotland
- Genre: Regional news
- Directed by: Alasdair Murray; Keith Samuel; Andrew Turnbull; Ruaraidh MacLeod, Laura Peace
- Presented by: Andrea Brymer; Kelly-Ann Woodland
- Theme music composer: Paul Leonard-Morgan
- Country of origin: Scotland
- Original language: English

Production
- Executive producers: Linda Grimes Douglas (Head of News & Current Affairs)
- Production locations: Glasgow, Scotland
- Editor: Andrew Browne
- Camera setup: Multi-camera
- Running time: STV News at Six: 30 minutes; STV News: Durations vary
- Production companies: STV News and Current Affairs

Original release
- Network: STV
- Release: 23 March 2009 – present

Related
- ITV News; Scotland Tonight; What's On Scotland; Scotland Today (1972-2009); North Tonight (1980-2009)

STV News is a Scottish news division produced by STV. The news department produces services covering STV's Channel 3 franchise areas of Northern and Central Scotland.

STV News programmes are produced from studios in Glasgow with reporters also based at newsrooms in Aberdeen, Dundee, Edinburgh and Inverness; and political correspondents based at Holyrood and Westminster. Freelance correspondents and camera crews are based on the Orkney and Shetland Isles, Wick and Fort William with a permanent Western Isles correspondent based in Stornoway.

In addition to its daily bulletins and online services, STV News also produces the current affairs programme Scotland Tonight, the showbiz magazine show What's On Scotland, along with feature documentaries.

== Broadcast ==
The four advertising sub-regions of STV

STV News at Six air on STV each weeknight at 6:00 pm. The programme includes separate sections for the North and Central regions (usually 8 minutes in length, one opt-out section is recorded shortly before broadcast). The ITV Evening News, the networked news programme, follows at 6:30 pm.

The main evening programmes are supplemented by shorter STV News bulletins seven days a week, broadcast across both Central and North regions:

- Good Morning Scotland (not to be confused with former BBC Radio Scotland programme of the same name) updates during Good Morning Britain at around 6:30 am, 7:30 am and 8:30 am each weekday. All bulletins are broadcast from Glasgow.
- Lunchtime bulletins, usually at 1:55 pm (or 12:55 pm, depending on schedules) each weekday, following the ITV Lunchtime News.
- Late news bulletins, usually at 10:30 pm each weeknight, following ITV News at Ten.
- Weekend bulletins – one on Saturday evenings, one on Sunday evenings.

The Central edition and pan-regional bulletins are streamed live on STV Player, and are broadcast one hour after their original airing on STV +1. Both versions of STV News at Six, plus weekend bulletins are also available for catch-up for 1 day after broadcast on STV Player.

== Digital ==
STV News offers digital coverage through its website, native mobile apps, and distribution via platforms like Apple News and Google News. Their digital team collaborates with regional newsrooms. With over 700,000 followers on Facebook and over 600,000 on X (formerly Twitter), STV News maintains a strong social media presence.

== Overview ==
STV News at Six launched on Monday 23 March 2009 as part of a major station revamp. The nightly news programmes were previously known as Scotland Today in the STV Central region and North Tonight in the STV North region, with both programmes carrying local opt-outs from January 2007 onwards.

Previously in the Central region, viewers in the West and East areas received 5-minute bulletins within the main 6 pm programme – STV News West covered the area from Tobermory to Falkirk, with the presenter based in the main studio in Glasgow. Meanwhile, STV News East covered the area from Anstruther to Dunbar and was presented and produced at STV's Edinburgh studios. The full-length separate STV News at Six programmes for the two areas were launched on Monday 23 May 2011.

=== STV2 national news ===
On Monday 2 June 2014, a secondary news service, STV Glasgow News, was launched as part of the local television channel STV Glasgow. This was followed by the launch of a news service for STV Edinburgh on Monday 12 January.

Both channels were merged with new local TV services for Aberdeen, Ayr and Dundee in April 2017 to form STV2, providing national news bulletins throughout the day with half-hour programmes at 1 pm and 10 pm on weekdays.

In September 2016, STV announced it would launch a news programme combining Scottish, UK and international news coverage. STV News Tonight was produced and broadcast from Glasgow using STV's resources from across Scotland and the UK and international resources of ITN. The half-hour programme, launched on Monday 24 April 2017, was presented by Halla Mohieddeen and aired each weeknight at 7 pm on STV2.

=== Cutbacks ===
On 16 May 2018, STV announced 59 redundancies, including 34 from its news division. STV2 ceased broadcasting at the end of June 2018, marking the end of STV News Tonight and the station's national news service.

On STV itself, the Edinburgh-based edition of STV News at Six was axed and replaced with shorter opt-outs within a Central Scotland programme, co-anchored from the Glasgow and Edinburgh studios. STV North's regional news services were not affected, although nine jobs – three journalists and six technical posts – were lost at the company's Aberdeen studios.

NUJ members at STV voted in favour of strike action against the job cuts, although the union decided against immediate action after the company ruled out compulsory redundancies.

The last edition of STV News Tonight aired on Friday 29 June 2018, followed by the final East edition of STV News at Six on Friday 7 September 2018.

Further changes in October 2024 saw the Central Scotland programme revert to a single-anchor format from Glasgow and the closure of the Edinburgh studio, with the East opt-outs pre-recorded. The North edition follows a similar pattern with the Tayside opt-out now pre-recorded from Aberdeen, following the end of studio production in Dundee.

On 25 September 2025, STV announced it would seek permission from Ofcom to merge its two regional news services and axe its sub-regional opt-outs. Subject to regulatory approval, separate news programmes for the North and Central areas would be replaced with a pan-regional programme covering both STV licence areas from Glasgow, with the Aberdeen studios closing. According to chief executive Rufus Radcliffe, the company was also seeking to end its sub-regional opt outs for Tayside and Edinburgh. The plan was approved by Ofcom in June 2026.

The sub-regional service ended in June 2026 with the final separate editions of STV News at Six airing on Friday 10 July 2026. Weekday bulletins are now merged across the North and Central regions and presented from Glasgow with separate 8-minute opt-outs during the 6pm programme.

== The team ==
=== Main anchors ===
STV News at Six
| Anchor | Other Roles |
|---|---|
| Andrea Brymer | Occasional lunchtime/late presenter |
| Kelly-Ann Woodland | Occasional lunchtime/late presenter |
| Emma Cameron | (Relief) Occasional lunchtime/late presenter; What's On Scotland co-presenter |

Reporters
| Courtney Cameron | Reporter | Good Morning Scotland bulletin presenter |
| Gordon Chree | Senior Reporter | |
| Sharon Frew | Chief Reporter | |
| Vanessa Kennedy | Reporter | |
| Ross Govans | Producer | |
| Steven Brown | Reporter | |
| Haley Bouma | Reporter | |
| Saul Sievwright | Reporter | |

Political team
| Reporter | Role | Notes |
|---|---|---|
| Colin Mackay | Political Editor | Based in Edinburgh; Occasional Scotland Tonight presenter |
| Lucy Dunn | Westminster Correspondent | Based in London |
| Ewan Petrie | Political Correspondent | Occasional Scotland Tonight presenter |
| Laura Alderman | Political Reporter | |

Entertainment
| Reporter | Role | Notes |
|---|---|---|
| Laura Boyd | Entertainment Reporter | What's On Scotland co-presenter |

STV Sport team
| Reporter | Role | Notes |
|---|---|---|
| Raman Bhardwaj | Sports presenter | |
| Chris Harvey | Sports Reporter | Relief Sports presenter |
| Jamie Borthwick | Sports Reporter | Relief Sports presenter |
| Ronnie Charters | Sports Reporter | Relief Sports presenter |
| Stefani Dailly | Sports Reporter | Relief Sports presenter |

STV Weather team
| Forecaster | Role |
|---|---|
| Seán Batty | Main Weekday Weather Presenter |
| Philip Petrie | Main Weekend Weather Presenter, Relief Weekday Presenter |
| Jo Farrow | Relief Weekend Weather Presenter, Relief Weekday Presenter |

| Preceded by Ciaran Jenkins | RTS Journalism Awards; Young Talent – Peter Smith; 2014 | Succeeded by Mstyslav Chernov |
| Preceded by N/A | RTS Scotland Awards; News Coverage: Clutha Helicopter Crash; 2014 | Succeeded by BBC Scotland Investigates: The Dog Factory |
| Preceded by ??? | RTS Scotland Awards; News Programme (STV News at Six – Central); 2016 | Succeeded by Reporting Scotland |
| Preceded by ??? | RTS Scotland Awards; Television Journalist – Bernard Ponsonby; 2016 | Succeeded by N/A |
| Preceded by Reporting Scotland | RTS Scotland Awards; News Programme (STV News at Six – North); 2018 | Succeeded by STV News at Six – Central |
| Preceded by Kevin Anderson | RTS Scotland Awards; Young Journalist – Ben Philip; 2018 | Succeeded by Ceri Isfryn |
| Preceded by STV News at Six – North | RTS Scotland Awards; News Programme (STV News at Six – Central); 2019 | Succeeded by STV News at Six – North |
| Preceded by STV News at Six – Central | RTS Scotland Awards; News Programme (STV News at Six – North); 2020 | Succeeded by Eòrpa, (Episode 1 Slavery) |
| Preceded by Eòrpa, (Episode 1 Slavery) | RTS Scotland Awards; News Programme (STV News at Six – Central); 2022 | Succeeded by Incumbent |
