= Handmade: Britain's Best Woodworker =

- Genre: Reality; Game show
- Presented by: Mel Giedroyc
- Judges: Alex de Rijke (series 1); Helen Welch (series 1); Tom Dyckhoff (series 2 & 3); Sophie Sellu (series 2 & 3)
- Theme music composer: Matthew Slater
- Country of origin: United Kingdom
- Original language: English
- No. of series: 3
- No. of episodes: 22

Production
- Executive producers: Grant Mansfield; Karen Plumb
- Producer: Carrie Smith
- Production location: Glanusk Estate
- Running time: 47 minutes
- Production company: Plimsoll Productions

Original release
- Network: Channel 4
- Release: 21 October 2021 – 26 November 2023

Related
- The Great British Bake Off; The Great Pottery Throw Down; The Great British Sewing Bee; All That Glitters: Britain's Next Jewellery Star

Handmade: Britain's Best Woodworker is a reality show that began airing on Channel 4 on 21 October 2021. In the show, woodworkers compete to be named "Britain's Best Woodworker". A spin-off of the format of The Great British Bake Off, the programme is presented by Mel Giedroyc, with judges Alex de Rijke and Helen Welch (series 1), and Tom Dyckhoff and Sophie Sellu (series 2 and 3). To date, three series have been produced and screened.

Outside of the UK, the programme is marketed as Good with Wood: Britain's Best Woodworker.

== Series format ==
The show format is similar to The Great British Bake Off in that each episode features challenges that are to be completed within a certain time period. The series starts with eight woodworkers, usually with one being eliminated each episode. In the Big Build challenge, the woodworkers are given two days to create a specific item. In the Skills Test, held part way through the Big Build, woodworkers are tasked with making an object which requires a specific woodworking skill. The winner of that challenge wins immunity from elimination for that episode.

== Series overview ==
| Series | Episodes | Premiere | Final | Winner |
|---|---|---|---|---|
| 1 | 6 | 21 October 2021 | 25 November 2021 | Misti Leitz |
| 2 | 8 | 21 September 2022 | 9 November 2022 | Lauren Wood |
| 3 | 8 | 8 October 2023 | 26 November 2023 | Nathanael Griffiths |

=== Series 1 (2021) ===
The first series of Handmade: Britain’s Best Woodworker started on 21 October 2021 and aired for six episodes concluding on 25 November 2021. There were eight woodworkers. The series was hosted by Mel Giedroyc, with judges Alex de Rijke and Helen Welch. Filming took place at the Glanusk Estate in the Brecon Beacons National Park. The final was won by Misti Leitz, with Charlie and Radha as runners up.

=== Series 2 (2022) ===
The second series of Handmade: Britain’s Best Woodworker started on 21 September 2022, and aired for eight episodes concluding on 9 November 2022. The programme commenced with 10 woodworkers, one of whom was replaced after the first episode. The series was again hosted by Mel Giedroyc, with there being two new judges; Tom Dyckhoff and Sophie Sellu. Filming again took place at the Glanusk Estate in the Brecon Beacons National Park. The final was won by Lauren Wood, with Chloe and Jacob as runners up.

=== Series 3 (2023) ===
The third and final series of Handmade: Britain’s Best Woodworker began broadcasting on 8 October 2023, and aired for eight episodes concluding on 26 November 2023. The programme commenced with 10 woodworkers. The series was again hosted by Mel Giedroyc, with Tom Dyckhoff and Sophie Sellu returning as judges. Filming again took place at the Glanusk Estate in the Brecon Beacons National Park. The final was won by Nathanael Griffiths, with Jen and Wolfgang as runners up.

== International broadcasts ==
=== Broadcast ===
- New Zealand - broadcast since 2021 on TVNZ 1

== See also ==
- All That Glitters: Britain's Next Jewellery Star
- The Great British Bake Off
- The Great British Sewing Bee
- The Great Pottery Throw Down
