= Banjo Beale =

Interior designer based in Scotland

Brendan "Banjo" Beale is an Australian interior designer, television presenter and author based in Scotland. He came to prominence by competing on the BBC reality competition television series Interior Design Masters, and has since starred in Scotland's Home of the Year, Designing the Hebrides and Banjo and Ro's Grand Island Hotel.

== Early life ==
Beale is from Bathurst, Australia. He grew up close to the Mount Panorama Circuit.

As a child, Beale's mother would allow him to rearrange the furniture in their lounge room and decorate his own bedroom, which began his interest in interior design.

== Career ==
=== Television ===
==== Interior Design Masters ====
Beale won the third series of Interior Design Masters. In the finale, he competed against Amy Davies in transforming bars in Soho, London. In addition to the regular judge Michelle Ogundehin, Beale's win was also decided by Sarah Willingham and Matthew Williamson. As the winner, Beale was given the contract to redesign a beach home in Watergate Bay, Cornwall.

==== Scotland's Home of the Year ====
Beale joined the judging panel of Scotland's Home of the Year in 2022 for its fifth series, replacing Kate Spiers.

==== Designing the Hebrides ====
In 2023, the first series of Designing the Hebrides was released. Designing the Hebrides followed Beale as he completed interior design projects across the Hebrides, accompanied by a cast of tradespeople. Each episode featured a new location and project. The show returned for its second series in 2024.

Designing the Hebrides was praised for its cosy atmosphere and its showcasing of the Hebrides' natural beauty. It was the 2023 winner of the BAFTA Award for Best Feature.

==== Banjo and Ro's Grand Island Hotel ====
Banjo and Ro's Grand Island hotel followed Beale as he renovated Ulva House (a ruined Grade-B listed manor on Ulva) into a hotel. The property rights were secured on a rent and repair lease, and a portion of the hotel's profits will be returned to the community to support the rejuvenation of the island. Ulva House is expected to open in summer of 2026.

=== Books ===
Beale is the author of two books. Wild Isle Style: Resourceful And Sustainable Interior Design Ideas, published in 2023, is a guide to incorporating sustainability into interior design. A Place in Scotland: Beautiful Scottish Interiors presents a collection of spaces that showcase the new sense of Scottish interior design.

== Personal life ==
Beale is married to Rohan Christopher, a cheesemonger and distiller. Within weeks of meeting at a bar in Australia, they embarked on a worldwide backpacking journey that resulted in them settling on the Isle of Mull. There, they worked at Sgriob-ruadh Farm, where they produced Isle of Mull cheddar.

Beale owns a dog named Grampa, who was rescued from being used as pig hunting bait.

Beale was given the nickname 'Banjo' because he is highly strung.
