= Jasmine and Melissa Hemsley =

British food writers

Jasmine and Melissa Hemsley (born February 1980 and September 1985, respectively) are English food writers and media personalities who have been closely associated with the clean eating and "wellness" movement. Their first book, The Art of Eating Well (2014) spawned a television series on Britain's Channel 4 titled Eating Well with Hemsley + Hemsley.

== Early life ==
Jasmine and Melissa Hemsley are sisters born in London in February 1980 and September 1985 respectively to Evangelina who was born in the Philippines and worked in software management, and Jack Hemsley, a lieutenant colonel in the British Army Light Infantry (died 2014). They grew up in service accommodation on army bases in England and Germany.

== Career ==
Jasmine worked as a model after leaving school, bringing her own food to shoots from which she developed a food-delivery service that Melissa joined. In 2012 they began a recipe blog on the Vogue website. Their first book, The Art of Eating Well, was published in 2014 after which they had a television series on Channel 4 titled Eating Well with Hemsley + Hemsley. Their second book was Good + Simple (2014).

Along with Natasha Corrett and Ella Woodward, they have been closely associated with the clean eating and "wellness" movement, but say they have never mentioned clean eating in their books. They say they offer a "simple, healthy approach to life that stretches beyond the kitchen" and use recipes without gluten, grain, or refined sugar. (Note: Their recipes do include pseudograins such as quinoa, and chia.) Neither sister is a qualified nutritionist. Their approach has been criticised, however, as a form of "wellness evangelism" that may not confer the health benefits it promises.

== Selected publications ==
- The Art of Eating Well. Ebury Press, London, 2014. ISBN 9780091958329
- Good + Simple. Ebury Press, London, 2014. ISBN 9781785031601
