= Natasha Corrett =

British chef and food writer

Natasha Corrett (born July 1983) is a British vegetarian chef and food writer, and advocate of clean eating and alkaline eating principles.

== Early life ==
Natasha Corrett was born in July 1983 to the interior designer Kelly Hoppen and her first husband Graham Corrett. She showed an early interest in music and her mother encouraged her to take professional singing lessons. She is married to Simon Bateman.

== Career ==
Corrett first worked as a personal assistant and then events organiser in her mother's business. After that she ran holistic retreats and began to cook when the chef she had booked for an event did not arrive. She began to write about food and completed her first two books jointly with her godmother Vicki Edgson. She is an advocate of vegetarianism, clean eating and alkaline eating principles through her Honestly Healthy website and brand which she founded in 2010.

== Selected publications ==
- Honestly Healthy: Eat with your body in mind, the alkaline way. 2012. (With Vicki Edgson)
- Honestly Healthy for Life: Healthy alternatives for everyday eating. 2014. (With Vicki Edgson)
- Honestly Healthy Cleanse. 2015.
- Alkaline Cleanse: 100 recipes to cleanse and nourish. 2016.
- Honestly Healthy in a Hurry: The busy food-lover's cookbook 2016

== See also ==
- Anthony Warner (chef)
- Ella Woodward
