= John Bezerra =

American athlete

- Education: California Polytechnic State University, San Luis Obispo
- Occupation: Bodybuilder
- Website: johnbezerrafitness.com

John Bezerra is an American athlete, author, professional bodybuilder, and celebrity trainer. He has been featured in Muscle & Fitness, Iron Man Magazine, Flex, and MuscleMag International. He has also appeared on the FX crime drama series Sons of Anarchy.

== Background ==
Bezerra was born in the central California farm town of Delano. He began sports at a very young age, and eventually, became a national champion in three separate sports: wrestling, BMX racing, and bodybuilding. He graduated with a bachelor's degree in kinesiology from California Polytechnic State University, San Luis Obispo in 1990.

== Career ==
Bezerra was mentored by former Mr. America and Mr. Universe champion Joe DeAngelis. He earned his Bodybuilder Pro Card in 1994. In 1996, Bezerra won first place in the National Physique Committee’s mixed pairs competition in Dallas, Texas.

His bodybuilding career has led to acting roles in the 300, War of the Worlds, and the FX crime drama series Sons of Anarchy. He has been featured in Muscle & Fitness, Iron Man Magazine, Flex, and MuscleMag International.
