= Alex Carnerio =

Brazilian/American personal trainer (born 1987)

Alexandre Carneiro
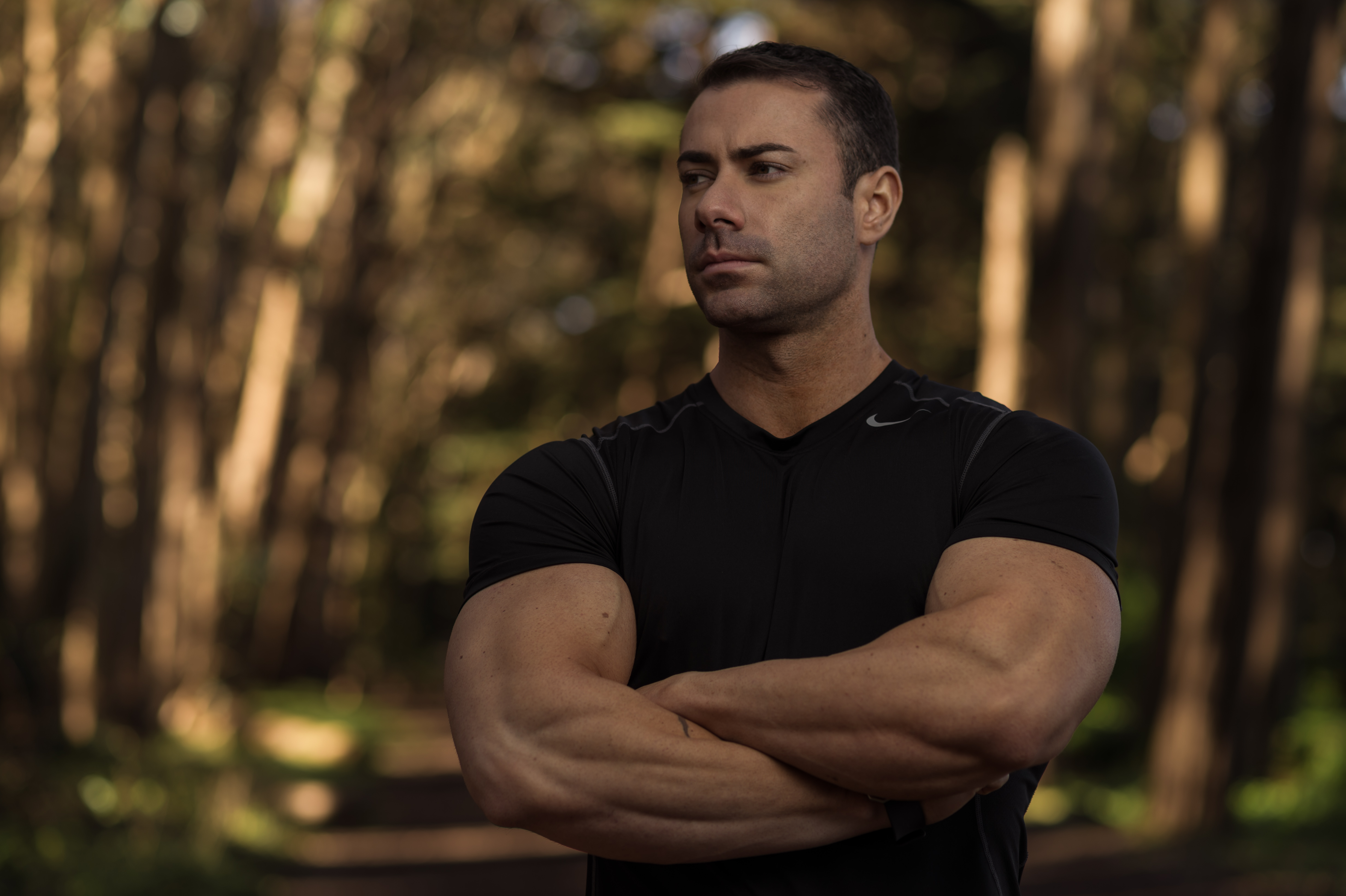
- Born: November 21, 1987 (age 39); Brasília, DF, Brazil
- Education: University of Northern Colorado (kinesiology / nutrition)

Alexandre Marx Carneiro (born November 21, 1987) is a Brazilian/American international personal trainer best known for transforming people's body and health. Certified nutritionist & personal trainer, International Federation of BodyBuilding & Fitness former professional IFBB men's physique, kinesiologist, and celebrity coach. In 2017 Alexandre was published as a health author with his first book ‘Fitting In - The Mask of Health’ discussing the dilemma of contemporary social image in the health world. Additionally, in 2017 Alexandre opened Denver's top private personal training studio teaching his philosophy with his Driven team. Today he is one of the leading authorities of fitness and wellness in the state of Colorado transforming peoples lives and healths. As a television host for the largest Hispanic speaking network, Univision, Alexandre also provides weekly advice on how everyone can benefit from exercise and eating smart for their goals.

Carneiro was the first Brazilian and Latino in the history of the International Federation of BodyBuilding & Fitness Men's Physique division to win an overall title in the NPC California Men's Physique division and the first Brazilian and Latino to represent South America in the first Mr. Olympia Physique showdown in 2013. He was also the first International Federation of BodyBuilding & Fitness Pro Physique in the history of Colorado.

== Biography and career ==
Carneiro began his fitness journey at the age of 17 when his passion for fitness grew one summer afternoon when his older brother took him to his local gym. He began training when he was a junior at Nido de Aguilas International School in Santiago de Chile. From an early age one of his parents moved to Rome Italy where he grew up and spent most of his years traveling around the world. At the age of 10 his parents relocated to Santiago de Chile where he spent 8 years. Carneiro was an average student, he didn't shine in math, science, or sports but loved spending time on the computer where he learned a lot about graphic design and web design. However, it wasn't until he was a sophomore in High School that his passion for sports grew and brought a desire to want to be better at them. Desiring to get to know the body better Carneiro designed to commit to coming to the United States and become a Physical Therapist yet changed his degree later to Spots and Exercise Science and Nutrition. During his college years at University of Northern Colorado, Carneiro developed a huge passion for bodybuilding and physique enhancement and spent his years studying and becoming a world known fitness model. Carneiro has been featured on the cover of several fitness magazines such, as Muscle & Body, MuscleMag, Revista Fisico and Muscle in Form. He also has over 40 international appearances in magazines such as Muscle & Fitness, Men's Health, Men's Fitness, Men's Exercise and more around the globe.

== Competitive placings ==
Year	Awards	Placing
2015	IFBB Mile High Pro	3rd
2015	IFBB MuscleContest Vegas Atlantis	3rd
2015	IFBB MuscleContest L.A. Grand Prix Pro	4th
2015	IFBB Governor's Cup	5th
2014	IFBB Mile High Pro	2nd
2014	IFBB MuscleContest L.A. Grand Prix Pro	6th
2013	IFBB Mr. Olympia	10th
2013	IFBB Greater Gulf States	2nd
2013	IFBB MuscleContest L.A. Grand Prix ProGran Prix Pro	3rd
2012	IFBB Houston Pro	2nd
2012	IFBB MuscleContest L.A. Grand Prix Pro	5th
2012	IFBB Governor's Cup	2nd
2011	NPC Jr. Nationals – 1st Place Class A	Qualified to be IFBB Pro
2011	NPC Jr. USAs	3rd Class A
2011	NPC Northern Championships	Height Class Winner 1st
2011	NPC MuscleContest Championships	Height C 1st *Overall Champion Men's Physique
2010	Olympia Muscle and Fitness Model	

== Television appearances ==
- Telemundo Denver Fitness Personality/ Host
- Channel 9 Fitness Expert
- CNWN 2 Fitness Expert
- FOX 31 Denver Fitness Expert
- Canal TRO Colombia - Special Morning Guest
- Univision Health Host
- FOX 31 / KDVR Denver - Celebrity Fitness Guest COVID-19 Edition
- FOX 21 - Celebrity Fitness Guest
- KTLA 5 Los Angeles CW - Celebrity Personal Trainer Guest
