= Anthony Warner =

Anthony Warner may refer to:

- Anthony Warner (chef) (born 1973), chef and food writer
- Anthony Quinn Warner (1957–2020), perpetrator of the 2020 Nashville bombing
- Tony Warner (born 1974), footballer
