= Sefton Samuels =

British documentary photographer (1931–2024)

Sefton Samuel Samuels FRPS
- Born: 27 January 1931; Manchester, England
- Died: 26 July 2024 (aged 93); Manchester, England
- Occupation: Photojournalist

Sefton Samuels (27 January 1931 – 26 July 2024) was a British photographer known for his photojournalistic portrayal of northern England. He was described by painter LS Lowry as his favourite photographer. His style has been compared to that of photographer Bill Brandt.

Shot over five decades, his pictures include images of George Best, LS Lowry, Coronation Street, Louis Armstrong and the changing culture and landscape of northern England. Around one hundred of Samuels' photographs are held in the National Portrait Gallery and Victoria and Albert Museum. He has also held exhibitions at the Barbican Centre, Kings Place and Proud Galleries.

== Life and work ==
Samuels was born in Manchester in 1931. He worked in the mills of Lancashire and Yorkshire and as a professional jazz drummer before turning to photography.

He was a member of the Manchester Amateur Photographic Society and joined the Royal Photographic Society in 1960. His photograph of George Best was used on the cover of Paul Weller's Stanley Road album designed by artist Peter Blake. Samuels' intimate images of LS Lowry at home were used as the basis for a life-size statue of the painter erected in a Manchester bar. He had exhibitions at the Barbican Centre, Kings Place and Proud Galleries. In 2011, Random House published a major collection of Samuels' work documenting the north of England over five decades, entitled Northerners: Portrait of a no-nonsense people. He was interviewed about Northerners by his son, BBC documentary maker and broadcaster Tim Samuels, on The Culture Show on BBC Two.

Samuels died on 26 July 2024, at the age of 93.

== Awards ==
Samuels was a winner at the 2011 Royal Academy of Arts Eyewitness awards—inspired by Brassaï and Robert Capa—for street photography he took in Madeira. He gained his Associate (ARPS) of the Royal Photographic Society in December 1960 and Fellowship (FRPS) of the Royal Photographic Society in December 1965.

== Collections ==
Around one hundred of Samuels' photographs are held in the National Portrait Gallery and Victoria and Albert Museum.

== Exhibition (with others) ==
- 1963: Nine Photographers, Manchester Building and Design Centre, Manchester, 18 November – 6 December 1963. With Shirley Baker, Dennis Btesh, Ray Green, Alfred Gregory, Neil Libbert and Ralph Marshall.
