= Scotland's Home of the Year =

British reality television series

- Title card
- Genre: Reality competition
- Created by: Nordisk Film TV Denmark
- Directed by: Julyan Sinclair; Pete Stanton; Carlin Wallace
- Judges: Michael Angus; Anna Campbell-Jones; Kate Spiers; Banjo Beale; Danny Campbell
- Narrated by: Anne McAlpine
- Country of origin: Scotland
- Original language: English
- No. of series: 8
- No. of episodes: 71

Production
- Executive producers: Gerard Costello; Pauline Law
- Producers: Susan McGregor; Julyan Sinclair; Pete Stanton; Sarah Wright; Carlin Wallace
- Cinematography: Liam Macleod
- Editors: Benjie Bateman; Evan Crichton; Hannah Macleod; Dylan Roodt
- Running time: 30–60 minutes
- Production company: IWC Media

Original release
- Network: BBC Scotland
- Release: 10 April 2019 – present

Related
- Home of the Year

Scotland's Home of the Year (often abbreviated to SHOTY) is a Scottish reality competition television series. The programme is based on the format of the Norwegian series Årets Hjem, originally created by Nordisk Film TV Denmark and distributed by Banijay. The first series, consisting of seven 30-minute episodes and an hour-long finale, premiered on BBC Scotland on 10 April 2019 as a primetime fixture in the schedule. The programme was renewed for a fourth series, which began filming in June 2021 and aired in 2022. It was then renewed for a fifth series, which began filming in June 2022 and aired 15 May 2023 with the final broadcast 26 June 2023.

The series follows three property experts, as they travel around Scotland and judge homes based on how well the owners have designed and utilised their available space. One property is selected from each region, and the winner is selected from the homes that reach the finals. Scotland's Home of the Year has received positive reviews from critics and ratings have continued to strengthen throughout its run. The programme was nominated for a Scottish BAFTA in 2020.

== Format ==
Each series of Scotland's Home of the Year features three different homes every week, grouped together based on the region of Scotland they are located in. The houses were grouped into seven distinct regions for the first series, and nine regions from series two onwards. The homes are assessed by the judges, each scoring them out of ten, with marks being awarded for functionality, distinctiveness and style. At the end of the episode, the home with the most points advances to the series finale. Once a home is selected from each region, the finalists are narrowed down to a top 3 in the last episode, before a winner is chosen and awarded a trophy. The series finale every year is recorded in the House for an Art Lover, situated in Bellahouston Park, Glasgow.

The original judging panel consisted of architect and University of Strathclyde lecturer Michael Angus, interior designer Anna Campbell-Jones, and lifestyle blogger Kate Spiers. In June 2022, winner of the third series of Interior Design Masters Banjo Beale, was announced as the newest member of the judging panel for series five, replacing Spiers who decided to take a break from filming due to pregnancy. Glasgow based architect Danny Campbell joined the judging panel for series six in 2024, replacing Michael Angus. Broadcaster Anne McAlpine has served as the narrator in every series.

== Broadcast history and release ==
The first series aired between 10 April and 29 May 2019 on BBC Scotland, replacing the docuseries Mini Disco Divas for the Wednesday primetime slot at 8 pm. On 24 June 2019, the show was recommissioned for a second series with two additional episodes. Reruns of the first series aired on BBC One Scotland from 12 July 2019. The second series premiered on 29 April 2020 in the same time slot. Ahead of the series finale on 1 July 2020, the programme was renewed for a third series, which premiered on 7 April 2021. Two weeks later, the BBC confirmed that it had commissioned a fourth series. From the third series onwards, reruns now air on BBC One Scotland on the Monday after their original screening. Internationally, the series currently airs on the Home Channel, a network based in South Africa that broadcasts across Sub-Saharan Africa via DStv.

== Series overview ==
Series	Episodes	Originally aired		Winner
Series	Episodes	First aired	Last aired	Winner
Series 1 (2019)	8	10 April 2019	29 May 2019	Lesley Smith – The White House (Kirkcudbright, Dumfries and Galloway)
Series 2 (2020)	10	29 April 2020	1 July 2020	Hugh Berry – Park Terrace (Glasgow West End)
Series 3 (2021)	10	7 April 2021	9 June 2021	Karen and Matt Welstead – The Moss (Killearn, Stirling)
Christmas Special 2021	1	22 December 2021		Anne Macdonald – Corvisel House (Newton Stewart, Dumfries and Galloway)
Series 4 (2022)	10	4 April 2022	6 June 2022	Tom Hickman – New Tolsta (Isle of Lewis, Outer Hebrides)
Christmas Special 2022	1	19 December 2022		Liz Tindal – Overvale (Bonhill, West Dunbartonshire)
Series 5 (2023)	7	15 May 2023	26 June 2023	Christina and Ben Blundell – The Old Train House (Edinburgh)
Christmas Special 2023	1	18 December 2023		Katie and Jamie Morris – Bay Tree House (Edinburgh)
Series 6 (2024)	7	29 April 2024	10 June 2024	Anna McClelland – 1960s Bungalow (Milngavie, East Dunbartonshire)
Christmas Special 2024	1	16 December 2024		Angela and Mark Breen – Festive Farmhouse (Lesmahagow, Lanarkshire)
Series 7 (2025)	7	21 April 2025	2 June 2025	Jessica Zanoni and Chris Labrooy – Hilltop House (Pitmedden, Aberdeenshire)
Christmas Special 2025	1	22 December 2025		Ellenor and Gary – Holly Jolly Mouse House (Cumnock, East Ayrshire)
Series 8 (2026)	7	6 April 2026	18 May 2026	Robert and Emily Hairstans – Homegrown Hoose (Mortonhall, Edinburgh)

== Reception ==
=== Television ratings ===
The first series performed moderately, with viewership peaking in the penultimate episode, attracting a combined 100,200 viewers between BBC Scotland and BBC iPlayer. Following the series finale, the show was watched by over 266,000 viewers on BBC iPlayer.

=== Awards and nominations ===
Year	Organisation	Category	Recipient	Result	Ref.
2020	British Academy Scotland Awards	Best Feature	Scotland's Home of the Year production team	Nominated	
