= Tim Samuels =

British television presenter and film director

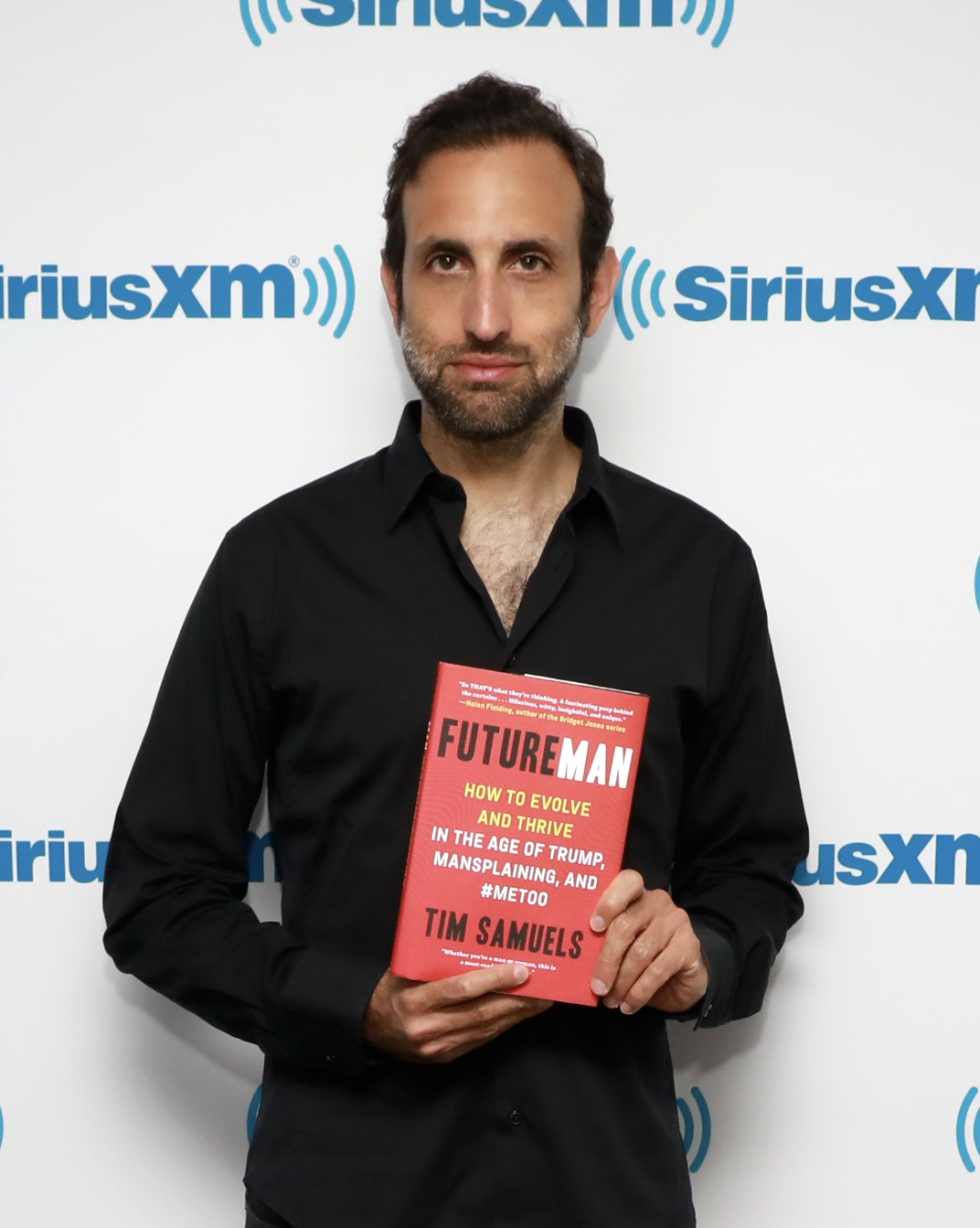
- Samuels during book launch in New York, 2019
- Born: Timothy David Samuels; 3 October 1975 (age 51); Manchester, England
- Education: Manchester Grammar School University of St Andrews
- Occupation: Film director
- Known for: Documentary filmmaking; broadcasting; journalism; writing
- Parent: Sefton Samuels

Timothy David Samuels (born 3 October 1975) is an English documentary filmmaker, author and broadcaster. His work is characterised by approaching serious topics in provocative and entertaining ways to produce hard-hitting documentaries. Samuels formed older people's rock group The Zimmers for a BBC documentary and is a regular presenter on BBC television and radio in the UK and has reported around the world for US TV channel National Geographic. He has been referred to as a younger British Michael Moore, but without the political agenda. Samuels has won three Royal Television Society awards and best documentary at the World Television Festival in Banff.

== Early life and education ==
Tim Samuels was born in Manchester, the son of photographer Sefton Samuels. Of part Romanian-Jewish descent, he attended Manchester Grammar School and the University of St Andrews. Samuels' first foray in journalism came at the age of 13 when he interviewed his musical hero Morrissey, the former lead singer of The Smiths. The interview took place at the home of the then teenage Samuels. At the University of St Andrews he rebranded the student newspaper, The Chronicle, as The Saint, taking it on to win The Guardian Student Newspaper of the Year award. He supports Manchester City.

== Career ==
=== Early years ===
Samuels joined the BBC as a news trainee after university. He spent a number of years as an investigative correspondent for the programme Newsnight and the main evening news bulletin. Samuels reported from the United States to expose miscarriages of justice on death row and worked undercover in Northern Ireland to reveal new forms of racism against the Muslim community in Northern Ireland, earning Young Journalist of the Year in 2002.

=== Documentaries and journalism ===
Samuels then moved to documentaries. In A Dirty Weekend in Hospital for the BBC's Mischief strand, he led a hundred victims of the MRSA superbug on an impromptu cleanup of ten of the worst hospitals in England. The programme won Best Current Affairs Documentary at the World Television Festival in Banff in 2006. In the same year he also fronted a current affairs travelogue series around Europe.

In 2007, Samuels' series Power to the People aired on BBC Two. Yoko Ono gave her blessing for the John Lennon song to be used as the title and soundtrack. The series saw him seizing Trafalgar Square with a platoon of abandoned soldiers, bringing a dying village from Cornwall to annex London's Islington and forming a rock group made up of lonely old people, The Zimmers. The popstar pensioners, with a 90-year-old lead singer, covered The Who song "My Generation" which then broke into the UK charts, received more than 5 million YouTube hits and saw the band appear on NBC's The Jay Leno Show alongside George Clooney. The Great Granny Chart Invasion won Best Current Affairs documentary at the Royal Television Society awards in 2008.

As part of the BBC's controversial "White Season", Samuels tackled mass immigration into Britain in The Poles Are Coming, which examined the influx of Polish immigrants into the Peterborough area of England. In 2009, he presented a BBC Two series, Hardcore Profits which revealed the unexpected global human impact of the pornography industry in countries like Ghana, and the industry's move to the financial mainstream.

The subject of war veterans was revisited by Samuels in Art For Heroes, which showed the impact of art therapy in helping to heal the mental scars of war, and culminated in Samuels staging an exhibition of artwork created by veterans who were being treated by the charity Combat Stress.

Samuels was a regular presenter on BBC Two's arts magazine show, The Culture Show. On several occasions for the show, he has staged an alternative Man Booker Prize using the residents of the Scottish town of Comrie as judges.

To mark thirty years of rock band The Smiths, he returned to the territory of his childhood interview with Morrissey, presenting Not Like Any Other Love: The Smiths for BBC Two.

Samuels continues to contribute provocative journalism to the Newsnight programme. The SNP complained after Samuels drove a car covered in the St George's Flag around Scotland during the 2006 World Cup, after England fans had been attacked for wearing their national shirts. In the Immigrant Song Contest, Samuels satirised the Eurovision Song contest, with immigrants to the UK covering Eurovision entries. For Newsnight, Samuels has repeatedly investigated the case of British businessman Krishna Maharaj who was jailed in Florida.

Samuels has made a number of documentaries for BBC Radio. For BBC 5 Live he created and fronted the men's magazine show Men's Hour, the male counterpart to Radio 4's Woman's Hour. His Radio 4 and World Service documentaries include Guerillas of Pop, Running Away, Find Me a New York Jewish Princess, What Men Think, Dr, Why?, Men in Therapy and Tel Aviv Comes Out which won gold at the New York Festivals international radio awards. Tim Samuels' Sleepover: Inside the Israeli Hospital was nominated for radio documentary of the year at the Radio Academy ARIAS awards. Samuels presented I Wish I'd Written That on BBC Radio 2. His podcasts include All Hail Kale, a wry look at wellness for the BBC, and White Men Can’t Work! – which critiqued the impact of DEI and its role in driving men towards populism.

A keynote event at the Danish TV Festival described Samuels as the "Benevolent Anarchist".

In 2013, the mental health charity Mind awarded Tim Samuels its Making A Difference award for his television and radio work – the first time it has been given to an individual.

For BBC One, Samuels returned to the topic of immigration for his documentary The Great Big Romanian Invasion, which investigated the panic surrounding the threatened mass influx of Romanians to the UK and included an exploration of his own background.

The National Geographic Channel announced Samuels had joined its new current affairs show Explorer as a global correspondent, reporting on US politics and covering stories in Australia, Pakistan, Iceland, Israel, Russia and Egypt.

Samuels covered the October 7 attacks for The Free Press - reporting on the ground in the aftermath of the assault on Kibbutz Be'eri, meeting survivors and those who lost family members, as well as showing the impact on Palestinians in the West Bank.

=== Writing ===
Samuels published his first book, Who Stole My Spear?, a candid exploration of what it means to be a man and the state of masculinity today. Blending the autobiographical with journalistic and anthropological research, the book examined the plight of modern men – covering relationships, work, religion, mental health, fatherhood, pornography, and rites of passage. Samuels argued that, 'Trapped in bodies barely changed since caveman days, males are now contending with corporate culture, lifelong commitment, rampant depression and crazy expectations to be a success at work and home.' He made the case for 'good masculinity' – a new way for men to connect with their innate nature and conditioning but in positive, contemporary ways. Who Stole My Spear? was serialised in The Sunday Times Magazine. An updated, US version was published as Future Man – with cover quotes from Helen Fielding and David Duchovny.

== Awards ==
- Royal Television Society: Best Current Affairs Documentary (2008)
- Royal Television Society: Best British News Story (2004)
- Royal Television Society: Young Journalist of the Year (2002)
- Banff World Television Festival: Best Current Affairs Documentary (2006)
- Race in Media Awards: TV Journalist of Year (2005)
- New York Festivals: World Medal (2004)
- Amnesty International commendation (2005)
- Mind Media Awards: Making A Difference award (2013)
- New York Radio Festivals: Gold Medal (2014)
- UK Radio Documentary of the Year - nominated (2017)

== See also ==
- The Abandoned Soldier
