= Handmade: Britain's Best Woodworker series 3 =

Handmade: Britain's Best Woodworker
- Season 3
- No. of episodes: 8

Release
- Original network: Channel 4
- Original release: 8 October – 26 November 2023

Series chronology
- ← Previous; Series 2

The third series of Handmade: Britain's Best Woodworker (known in some territories as Good With Wood) started on 8 October 2023 and aired for eight episodes. The series is again hosted by Mel Giedroyc, with Tom Dyckhoff and Sophie Sellu continuing to act as judges. Filming took place at the Glanusk Estate in the Brecon Beacons National Park.

== Woodworkers ==
Woodworker	Age	Occupation	Hometown
Ade		Trainee carpenter	Birmingham
Caroline		Veterinary nurse	Tyne and Wear
Clare		Tradeswoman	Glasgow
David		Assistant head teacher	Preston
Jen		Teacher	Aberdeen
Leo		Music teacher	Liverpool
Nate		Housing manager	Kent
Nathanael	18	Woodworker	Chester
Paula		Carer	Oxford
Wolfgang		IT manager	West Midlands

== Results and eliminations ==
Elimination chart
Woodworker	1	2	3	4	5	6	7	8
Nathanael	WINNER							WINNER
Jen						WINNER		RUNNER-UP
Wolfgang		WINNER		WINNER			WINNER	RUNNER-UP
Caroline			IMMUNITY		WINNER	IMMUNITY	OUT	
Clare			WINNER		IMMUNITY	OUT		
Leo				IMMUNITY	OUT			
Nate		IMMUNITY		OUT				
David			OUT					
Paula	IMMUNITY	OUT						
Ade	OUT							

Colour key:

Woodworker got through to the next round.
Woodworker was eliminated.
Woodworker won immunity from elimination.
Woodworker of the week.
Woodworker won both immunity from elimination and woodworker of the week.
Woodworker was a series runner-up.
Woodworker was the series winner.

== Episodes ==
Woodworker eliminated
Woodworker of the week
Woodworker won immunity
Winner

=== Episode 1 ===
The Big Build was to create a bench for the garden of their dreams. The Bespoke Brief was to make a wooden greetings card.

Woodworker	Big Build (Garden Bench)	Skills Test (Greetings Card)
Ade		
Caroline		
Clare		
David		
Jen		
Leo		
Nate		
Nathanael		
Paula		IMMUNITY
Wolfgang		

=== Episode 2 ===
The Big Build was to create a pair of freestanding lamps, which must be different and follow a theme. The Bespoke Brief was to make two chopsticks and a chopstick rest.

Woodworker	Big Build (Freestanding Lamps)	Skills Test (Chopsticks and Chopstick Rest)
Caroline		
Clare		
David		
Jen		
Leo		
Nate		IMMUNITY
Nathanael		
Paula		
Wolfgang		

=== Episode 3 ===
The Big Build was to create a coffee table, and an ornament to go with it. The Bespoke Brief was to make matching wooden dice.

Woodworker	Big Build (Coffee Table)	Skills Test (Dice)
Caroline		IMMUNITY
Clare		
David		
Jen		
Leo		
Nate		
Nathanael		
Wolfgang		

=== Episode 4 ===
The Big Build was to create a freestanding bookshelf inspired by nature. The Bespoke Brief was to make a candelabra, using wooden offcuts.

Woodworker	Big Build (Bookshelf)	Skills Test (Candelabra)
Caroline	Natural wood uprights	
Clare	Wave and jagged coastline	
Jen	Topographical map	
Leo	Trees (live edge oak shelves)	IMMUNITY
Nate	Two countries come together	
Nathanael	River Dee meanders	
Wolfgang	Weathered rock shards	

=== Episode 5 ===
The Big Build was to create a super-sized bug. The Bespoke Brief was to make a doghouse, using two sheets of plywood.

Woodworker	Big Build (Super-sized Bug)	Skills Test (Doghouse)
Caroline		
Clare		IMMUNITY
Jen		
Leo		
Nathanael		
Wolfgang		

=== Episode 6 ===
The Big Build was to make a four-poster bed for a honeymoon suite. The Bespoke Brief was to make an Indian block print, suitable for printing on fabric.

Woodworker	Big Build (Four-poster Bed)	Skills Test (Indian Block Print)
Caroline		IMMUNITY
Clare		
Jen		
Nathanael		
Wolfgang		

=== Episode 7: Semi-Final ===
The Big Build was to make a hanging chair, inspired by a holiday destination. The Bespoke Brief was to make a chair leg, turned on a pole lathe.

Woodworker	Big Build (Hanging Chair)	Skills Test (Chair Leg)
Caroline		
Jen		
Nathanael		
Wolfgang		IMMUNITY

=== Episode 8: Final ===
The Big Build was to build a kitchen island. The Bespoke Brief was to make an accessory to complement it.

Woodworker	Big Build (Kitchen Island)	Skills Test (Kitchen Accessory)
Jen		
Nathanael		
Wolfgang		
