= Daniel Hopwood =

English interior designer

- Education: Prince of Wales Institute of Architecture
- Occupation: Interior Designer
- Website: https://www.danielhopwood.com/

Daniel Hopwood is a London-based interior designer, the former president of the British Institute of Interior Design and a former judge on the BBC's amateur design programme The Great Interior Design Challenge along with Kelly Hoppen.

He has run his company 'Studio Hopwood' for the past twenty years. Previous to his BBC work he had presented and judged the Channel 4 series Britain’s Best Homes.

== Early life and education ==
Hopwood is from East Yorkshire and graduated with a degree in architecture from the Prince of Wales Institute of Architecture and then joined The Prince's Foundation.

== Career ==
Hopwood was elected as president of the British Institute of Interior Design in July 2014 and served until 2016 when he was replaced by Susie Rumbold.

== Bibliography ==
- Dyckhoff, Tom (6 November 2014). Great Interior Design Challenge Sourcebook: The DIY Way to Add Value to Your Home. Pavilion Books. ISBN 978-1909815865. Co-authored with Sophie Robinson, Daniel Hopwood and Katherine Sorrell.
