= Handmade: Britain's Best Woodworker series 1 =

Handmade: Britain's Best Woodworker
- Season 1
- No. of episodes: 6

Release
- Original network: Channel 4
- Original release: 21 October – 25 November 2021

Series chronology
- Next → Series 2

The first series of Handmade: Britain's Best Woodworker started on 21 October 2021 and aired for eight episodes concluding on 25 November 2021. The series was hosted by Mel Giedroyc, with judges Alex de Rijke and Helen Welch. Filming took place at the Glanusk Estate in the Brecon Beacons National Park.

== Woodworkers ==
Woodworker	Age	Occupation	Hometown
Billy		Builder & novice carpenter	Lancashire
Chantal		Artist & teacher	Midlands
Charlie		Furniture maker	Edinburgh
Jade		Furniture maker/set builder	Paris
Joe		YouTuber	Wolverhampton
Michelle		Retired	Essex
Misti		Sculptor	Ludlow
Radha		Junior cabinet maker	Watford
Tim		Bike mechanic	London

== Results and eliminations ==
Elimination chart
Woodworker	1	2	3	4	5	6
Misti	IMMUNITY			WINNER	WINNER	WINNER
Charlie		WINNER	IMMUNITY			RUNNER-UP
Radha	WINNER			IMMUNITY	IMMUNITY	RUNNER-UP
Billy		IMMUNITY			OUT	
Joe			WINNER	OUT		
Jade			OUT			
Michelle			OUT			
Tim		OUT				
Chantal	OUT					

Colour key:

Woodworker got through to the next round.
Woodworker was eliminated.
Woodworker won immunity from elimination.
Woodworker of the week.
Woodworker was a series runner-up.
Woodworker was the series winner.

== Episodes ==
Woodworker eliminated
Woodworker of the week
Woodworker won immunity
Winner

=== Episode 1 ===
Mel Giedroyc welcomes nine passionate enthusiast woodworkers to the workshop, where they are challenged to build a bed of dreams in just two days.

Woodworker	Big Build (Bed)	Skills Test (Printing Block)
Billy	Arched Framed Bed	
Chantal	Sleeper Bed	
Charlie	Living Tree Bed	
Jade	Four Poster Bed	
Joe	Space Age Bed	
Michelle	Six Poster Bed	
Misti	Gothic Bed	IMMUNITY
Radha	Japanese Low Bed	
Tim	Boat-shaped Bed	

=== Episode 2 ===
The Big Build challenge this week is to build a doll's house. With just 2 days to build what would normally take weeks, the pressure is on.

Woodworker	Big Build (Doll's House)	Skills Test (Impossible Dovetail Joint)
Billy	Rustic Farm House	IMMUNITY
Charlie	Lighthouse	
Jade	Arches Doll's House	
Joe	Modernist Doll's House	
Michelle	Chalet-style Doll's House	
Misti	Medieval Castle	
Radha	Indian Palace	
Tim	Transformable Doll's House	

=== Episode 3 ===
The woodworkers must bend and build their way to create chairs that could become design classics - and they have just two days to do it. Plus, the judges have a nasty surprise up their sleeves with a double elimination.

Woodworker	Big Build (Bespoke Chair)	Skills Test (Whittled Teaspoons)
Billy	Steam-bent Chair	
Charlie	Minimalist Cube Chair	IMMUNITY
Jade	Deck Chair	
Joe	Modernist Plywood Chair	
Michelle	Chair of Correction	
Misti	Regal Tub Chair	
Radha	Minimalist Rocking Chair	

=== Episode 4 ===
The five remaining woodworkers take on animal sculptures. They must chainsaw and carve their way through this colossal big build and unleash their inner beasts as they attempt to uncover the animal within the wood in just 2 days.

Woodworker	Big Build (Animal Sculpture)	Skills Test (Pole Lathe-turned Candlestick)
Billy	Oak Lion	
Charlie	Oak Snail	
Joe	Oak Boxer Dog	
Misti	Blackened Oak Zebra	
Radha	Peacock on a Log	IMMUNITY

=== Episode 5: Semi-Final ===
In the semi-final, the remaining woodworkers are asked to make a drinks cabinet inspired by a particular decade - the ultimate test of joinery, craftsmanship and design.

Woodworker	Big Build (Drinks Cabinet)	Skills Test (Lathe Lampshade)
Billy	Art Deco Drinks Cabinet	
Charlie	Art Deco Drinks Cabinet	
Misti	Memphis Style Drinks Cabinet	
Radha	Georgian-inspired Drinks Cabinet	IMMUNITY

=== Episode 6: Final ===
The three remaining woodworkers tackle their biggest build yet - towering garden buildings - in a bid to impress judges Alex de Rijke and Helen Welch, and be crowned Britain's best woodworker.

Woodworker	Big Build (Garden Building)	Skills Test (Marquetry)
Charlie	Hexagonal Potting Shed	
Misti	Geometric Garden Lounge	
Radha	Outdoor Meditation Room	
