= Tom Dyckhoff =

British writer and TV presenter

- Born: 1970 or 1971 (age 54–55); St Albans, England
- Occupations: Critic, journalist, author, presenter
- Years active: 1998–present
- Spouse: Claire
- Website: tomdyckhoff.co.uk

Tom Dyckhoff is a British writer, broadcaster and historian on architecture, design and cities. He has worked in television, radio, exhibitions, print and online media. He is best known for being a BBC TV presenter of The Great Interior Design Challenge, The Culture Show, I Love Carbuncles, The Secret Life of Buildings (on Channel 4) and Saving Britain's Past.

== Early life ==
He went to Aylesbury Grammar School (between 1983 and 1987) and then to the private Royal Grammar School Worcester (1987–1989).

Dyckhoff then received a BA in Geography from Oxford University.

== Career ==
He began his career in September 1995, at Perspectives on Architecture, (the Prince of Wales's architectural magazine), before becoming assistant editor at Design magazine, and then exhibitions curator at the Royal Institute of British Architects in 1998. Between 1999 and 2003 was deputy editor of "Space", The Guardian newspaper's design and homes section, and worked on its Weekend magazine.

He is teaching fellow in the history and theory of architecture and cities at the Bartlett School of Architecture at University College London. He is also History and Theory Tutor in MArch Architecture at Central Saint Martins. He has also taught at other institutions including Design Academy Eindhoven; University of Westminster, London; Cass School of Architecture, London Metropolitan University; and at the Architectural Association, London.

Dyckhoff wrote a weekly column for The Guardian newspaper's Weekend magazine from 2001 until 2020, and from 2003 to 2011, he was the architecture and design critic for The Times newspaper in London. He has written for international publications such as Blueprint, Architects' Journal, GQ, Arena, Wallpaper, Domus, New Statesman, Monocle and Icon. He has taught at University College London, where he was honorary senior research associate, acts as a visiting critic and lecturer at other universities, and regularly holds lectures and hosts events.

Dyckhoff is an Honorary Fellow of the Royal Institute of British Architects, has been a trustee of the Architecture Foundation, and was on the national shortlisting jury for the Stirling Prize for architecture from 2008 to 2012. In 2013 he was a judge on The Stirling Prize.

He has also sat on the architecture committees of the Arts Council, the British Council and the Twentieth Century Society (which campaigns for 20th century heritage), and on the British Council jury selecting the British Pavilion at the Venice Biennale.

In 2013, he began making radio programmes for BBC Radio 4, such as a documentary on Buckminster Fuller (an American design polymath), and a regular series on design, The Design Dimension. He was an editorial consultant behind rethinking the 21st edition of Sir Banister Fletcher's A History of Architecture. In 2017, Penguin Random House published his first book, The Age of Spectacle: adventures in architecture and the 21st-century city, a history of architecture and cities since the 1970s.

== Television career ==
Dyckhoff's first documentary was a one off, in 2004, about brutalist architecture for Channel 4, I Love Carbuncles. From 2006 to 2016, he was a Culture Show presenter, where he wrote and presented a range of short and full-length documentaries on diverse subjects, with interviewees, such as Frank Gehry, Ikea, Chinese design and architecture, Oscar Niemeyer, Thomas Heatherwick, Dieter Rams and Lego.

In 2009, he presented Saving Britain's Past, an exploration of Britain's relationship with heritage, on BBC2.

In 2011, he was a presenter of Channel 4's three-part series Secret Life of Buildings, which used the latest research in psychology and neuroscience and real-life experiments to examine the impact of spaces and architecture on our brains and bodies.

In 2013, he began presenting The Great Interior Design Challenge on BBC 2. He then presented Series 2 (Oct/ Nov 2014), Series 3 (Feb 2016) and Series 4 (Jan 2017) as well.

In 2022, he is a judge on the 2nd series of Channel 4's Handmade: Britain's Best Woodworker, a carpentry talent competitions show presented by Mel Giedroyc. He joins woodworking expert Sophie Sellu.

== Personal life ==
He lives in South East London, with his family. He is married to Claire.

== Bibliography ==
- Dyckhoff, Tom (27 February 2012). The Architecture of London 2012: Vision, Design and Legacy of the Olympic and Paralympic Games – An Official London 2012 Publication. John Wiley & Sons. ASIN B00CB5GE5C.

Co-authored with Claire Barrett

- Dyckhoff, Tom (20 June 2017). The Age of Spectacle: adventures in architecture and the 21st-century city. Random House Books. ISBN 978-1847946522.
- Dyckhoff, Tom (6 November 2014). Great Interior Design Challenge Sourcebook: The DIY Way to Add Value to Your Home. Pavilion Books. ISBN 978-1909815865.

Co-authored with Sophie Robinson, Daniel Hopwood and Katherine Sorrell
