= Sarah Mack =

Scottish television presenter and journalist

- Born: Sarah Jane Stephen; December 1972 (age 53); Glasgow, Scotland
- Occupations: Presenter, journalist
- Years active: 1998–2019
- Spouse: David Stephen ()
- Children: 4 (including Seb Stephen)

Sarah Jane Mack (née Stephen; born December 1972) is a Scottish television presenter and journalist.

== Career ==
Mack started her career at the now-defunct Edinburgh Live cable TV station as a runner and production journalist. Within two months of working for the station, she made her first on-screen appearance as a weather presenter.

She joined Grampian Television (now STV North) in August 1998 as a reporter and presenter for North Tonight. Whilst at Grampian, Mack also presented the social affairs series Grampian Midweek, magazine show Grampian Weekend (alongside Michael Crow), outdoor pursuits' programme The Great Outdoors and for Scottish Television, travel show Scottish Passport (alongside Bryan Burnett).

Mack left Grampian Television in 2003 to become a full-time mother, but returned to television in 2007 as a reporter and presenter for BBC Scotland's rural affairs programme, Landward. She decided to leave after discovering she was paid less than her male colleagues. Mack's last appearance on Landward was in December 2016.

Sarah occasionally presented reports on BBC One's The One Show from December 2012 to April 2016.

== Personal life ==
Mack lives with her husband, farmer David Stephen, and their four sons in 16th-century Barra Castle in Aberdeenshire, where they run a farm and hospitality business.
