= Robert Kennedy (publisher) =

Founder of Robert Kennedy Publishing, based in Mississauga, Ontario

- Born: 18 May 1938; Munich, Germany
- Died: 12 April 2012 (aged 73); Caledon Hills, Ontario, Canada
- Education: Culford private school
- Alma mater: Norwich University College of the Arts
- Occupation: Publisher
- Years active: 1972–2012
- Known for: Founder and Owner of Robert Kennedy Publishing
- Spouse: Tosca Reno (m. March 16, 2004)
- Children: 2

Robert Kennedy (May 18, 1938 – April 12, 2012) was the founder of Robert Kennedy Publishing, based in Mississauga, Ontario.

== Biography ==
The son of an Austrian father and an English mother, William and Doris Kennedy, both school teachers. He attended Culford School and Norwich University College of the Arts in Norfolk, England. After living in London and teaching art at the Tottenham Technical College for eight years, Kennedy moved to Canada in 1967, where he taught art for five years in Brampton, Ontario.

== Career ==
In 1972 Kennedy went into business for himself, selling courses of instruction by mail on nutrition, bodybuilding and fitness. In 1974 he started his first magazine, MuscleMag International, with an initial print run of 110,000. He had no previous experience with magazine publishing and MuscleMag would not turn a profit for 15 years, forcing Kennedy to dodge creditors and even sell his home and his car to finance it. The magazine ceased publication on June 7, 2013 after Robert Kennedy Publishing declared bankruptcy, and a little over a year after Kennedy himself died.

In addition to MuscleMag International, Kennedy has also written 53 books, including several New York Times bestsellers; Hardcore Bodybuilding, Reps!, RockHard!, Beef It!, and Pumping Up! He eventually decided to become a book publisher himself, and under Robert Kennedy Publishing, the company has published hundreds of books.

In 1976, Kennedy opened a chain of fitness stores called MuscleMag International, the first of which opened in downtown Toronto on Yonge Street. Kennedy soon followed with stores in Miami, New York, Las Vegas, and in the state of California, eventually reaching 28 stores. He also created a fitness clothing line (Faremon) and supplement line (Formula 1). Most of the stores were eventually closed, while the clothing and supplement line was sold or discontinued to concentrate on the core business of book and magazine publishing.

In 1997 Kennedy started Oxygen magazine, which targets a female fitness demographic. By 2008 the publication reached a circulation of over 200,000.

Currently, the magazine-publishing arm includes five titles: MuscleMag International (hardcore bodybuilding), Oxygen (women’s fitness), American Curves (swimsuit images of fitness women), Clean Eating (eating for health and fitness), and Reps! (building a proportionate body). In 2011 another title, Maximum Fitness, was folded into Reps! and the first issue was published with a double cover. Maximum Fitness had until then been a general men's fitness title published six times a year. Kennedy is known in the bodybuilding world for coining the term "Hardcore Bodybuilding", after publishing the book under the same name, and also for the concept of the Pre-Exhaust Principle, known and used during training by bodybuilders around the world.

Kennedy is further credited with discovering and helping launch the careers of numerous fitness models, bodybuilders, actors and wrestlers, including Trish Stratus, Victoria Pratt, Torrie Wilson, Cory Everson, Roland Kickinger, Larry Vinette and Ronnie Coleman. At the Arnold Classic bodybuilding and fitness expo held on March 3, 2012, just weeks before his death, Kennedy was awarded the Arnold Schwarzenegger Lifetime Achievement Award; the award was presented by Schwarzenegger to Kennedy's wife, Tosca Reno.

Kennedy was an internationally collected studio artist, and was himself a known admirer and collector of his contemporaries' artwork. His collection, which included over 250 contemporary original acrylic and oil paintings, passed to the care and management of Kennedy's family since his death. Kennedy himself painted under the name 'Wolfgang Kals', which was his father's name. Kennedy was also an avid photographer, known to travel yearly to Santa Monica to shoot the bodybuilding greats.

== Personal life ==
Kennedy had two children, a son, Braden, and a daughter, Chelsea, with his first wife. In 1998, Kennedy and Braden who was then 11, were in a car crash. Kennedy was thrown from the car but Braden suffered severe brain damage and would require round-the-clock care (until his death in March 2011). After the accident Kennedy's wife committed suicide.

Kennedy's second wife was fitness writer Tosca Reno, who is the author of the best-selling book series The Eat-Clean Diet (published by Robert Kennedy Publishing). Kennedy met Reno when she was Chelsea’s Grade 1 teacher, on the school playground. Reno, a mother of three, was at the time in the process of getting divorced and the two started a relationship and eventually married. Reno became a feature writer for Kennedy's Oxygen and Clean Eating magazines. Following Kennedy's death Reno assumed the position of publisher and chief executive officer at Robert Kennedy Publishing.

== Death ==
In February 2012, Kennedy was diagnosed with aggressive lung cancer. He tried alternative cancer treatments, such as high-dose intravenous infusions of vitamin C and B12, while also following a diet loaded with nutrients, healthy fats and protein. He was unable to stop the spread of the disease and died April 12, 2012, in his Caledon Hills, Canada home.

Robert Kennedy Publishing filed for bankruptcy in 2013. Oxygen, Clean Eating, and MuscleMag International were sold to Active Interest Media and moved to the US.

== Bibliography ==
- "The Eat-Clean Diet for Men" (2009)
- "Encyclopedia of Bodybuilding: The Complete A-Z Book on Muscle Building" (2008)
- "1001 Musclebuilding Tips" (2007)
- "Basic Routines for Massive Muscles Beef-It Training Secrets" (1998)
- "The New Hardcore Bodybuilding" (1990)
- "Hardcore Bodybuilding: The Blood Sweat and Tears of Pumping Iron" (1982)
