= Clean eating =

Type of diet based on avoiding processed foods

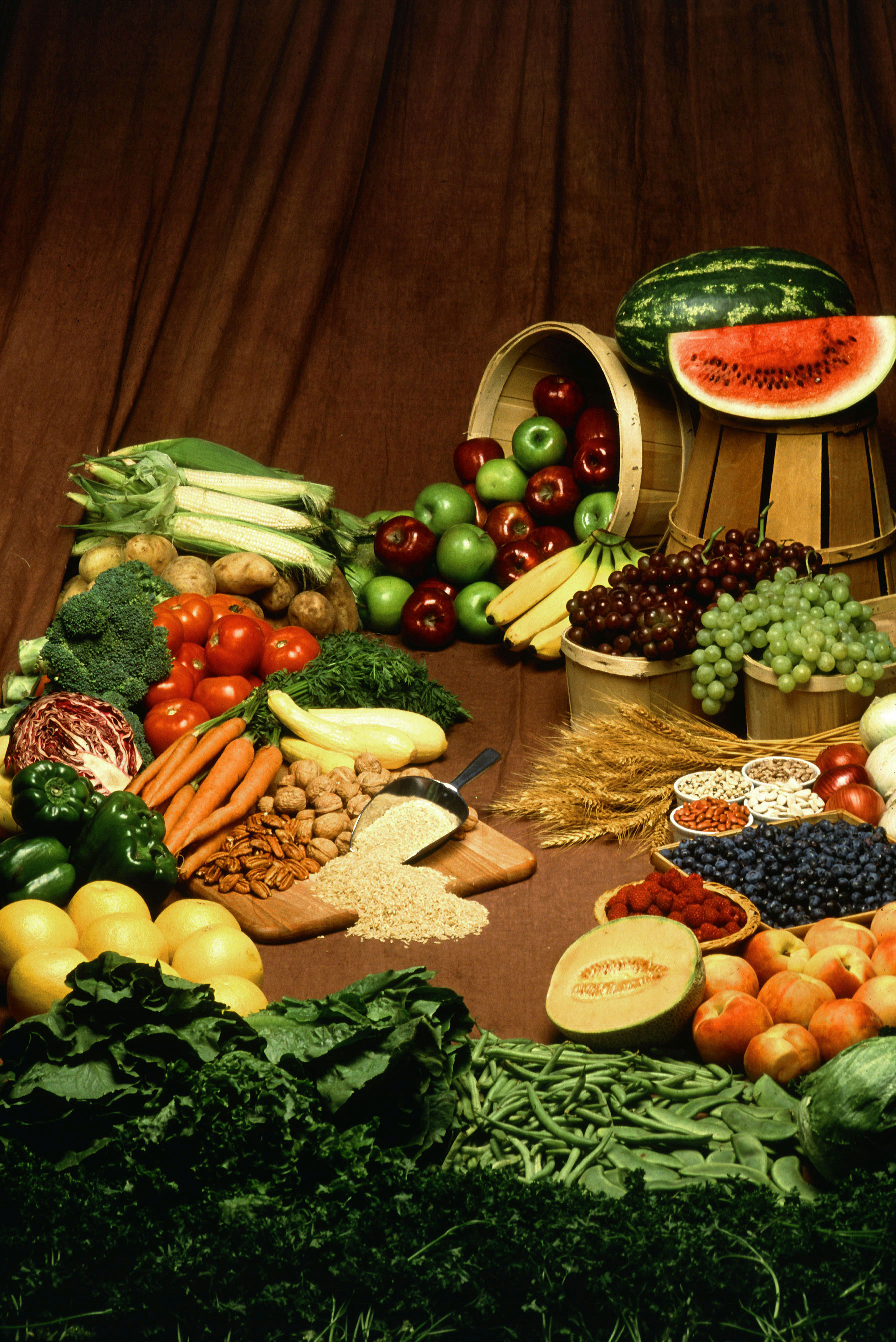
Unrefined whole foods

Clean eating is an umbrella term for variety of diets based on the belief that consuming whole foods and avoiding convenience food and other processed foods offers certain health benefits. Variations of the diet may also exclude gluten, grains, and/or dairy products and advocate the consumption of raw food.

== Definition ==
The term "clean eating" originated in the bodybuilding community in the ’90s and meant (and still means there) eating high protein and low carb and avoiding sugar, fat, and junk food to build lean muscle while not gaining body fat. Its meaning began to morph in the '00s with a series of popular "Eat-Clean" books by Tosca Reno (the wife of bodybuilding magazine publisher Robert Kennedy). Now, to many, clean eating is the belief that consuming whole foods and avoiding convenience food and other processed foods offers certain health benefits. Variations of the diet may also exclude gluten, grains, and/or dairy products and advocate the consumption of raw food.

== Proponents ==
While there is limited research on the health effects of clean eating, clean eating trends have become increasingly popular through the use of various media outlets including blogs, television segments, and magazine articles. Many of these media are supported and headed by various health and wellness gurus who typically base the information they provide on personal experience. Advocates include Ella Mills, Natasha Corrett, and the Hemsley sisters.

== Criticism ==
"Clean eating" has been used to describe a variety of diets. In the most basic form, the idea of eating more whole foods, fruit and vegetables, and reducing intake of processed, sugary foods like cakes, are broadly agreed on as good changes to one’s diet.

However, some more extreme variants, particularly those cutting out entire food groups, are criticized as lacking scientific evidence for their claims. It has also been claimed that a clean eating diet may increase the risk of osteoporosis due to a lack of calcium from dairy products. The extreme variants have also been described as fad diets.

== See also ==
- Health food
- List of diets
- Paleolithic diet
