= Kelly Hoppen =

British interior designer (born 1959)

Kelly Hoppen CBE
- Born: Kelly Elaine Hoppen; 28 July 1959 (age 66); Cape Town, Cape Province, Union of South Africa
- Occupations: Interior designer, author, proprietor, entrepreneur
- Television: Superior Interiors with Kelly Hoppen; Dragons' Den (2013–15)
- Spouses: Graham Corrett (m. 1982; div. 1989) Edwin Miller (m. 1989; div. 2003)
- Children: Natasha Corrett
- Website: Official website

Kelly Elaine Hoppen CBE (born 28 July 1959) is a South African-born British interior designer, author, and proprietor of Kelly Hoppen Interiors.

From 2013 to 2015, she was a "Dragon" on BBC Two's Dragons' Den.

== Early life ==
Kelly Hoppen was born on 28 July 1959 in Cape Town, South Africa. Her mother Stephanie Hoppen (née Shub) is of Estonian-Jewish ancestry and her father Seymour Hoppen who was a member of the Weinstock family from Dublin, is of Irish-Jewish ancestry. When Hoppen was two, her family relocated to London. Hoppen briefly returned to South Africa when her father died. During her return to South Africa, she played in a rock band and was arrested and imprisoned for violating apartheid laws by mixing with black musicians.

== Career ==
Hoppen began her career at 16 when she quit school and took on her first project designing a family friend's kitchen. Her next big project came in the way of designing the racing driver Damien Hunt’s house which led her to work with other race drivers and actors. She has since then designed for a number of celebrities, including David and Victoria Beckham; and Martin Shaw, who was one of her early clients. She has designed the homes, yachts and jets of private clients, as well as commercial projects in several countries, including hotels, restaurants, offices and aircraft. Some of Hoppen's most recent projects include a collaboration with Disney to celebrate Mickey Mouse's 90th anniversary, the Celebrity Edge cruise ship for Celebrity Cruises, an ultra luxury residential tower block in Taiwan, One Park Taipei, and LUX* Grand Gaube hotel, the second hotel she has designed for LUX* in Mauritius.

Hoppen is the author of 13 design books to date. She received much critical acclaim and recognition following the publication of her first book, East Meets West, which was published in 1997. In November 2013, Hoppen published Kelly Hoppen Design Masterclass – How to Achieve the Home of your Dreams.

Hoppen is known for her signature neutral palette and trademark Perfect Neutrals, and is often referred to as the "Queen of Taupe". She has said of her design philosophy: "My philosophy has always remained the same. It's about creating calm balanced environments based on Eastern cultures, i.e. order and creation of harmony. How people feel in a space is as important as the way it looks; one can't be without the other to succeed."

In January 2014, Hoppen launched her first e-commerce store with a self-designed interiors accessories range. The same year, the Daily Telegraph ranked her as the second most influential female interior designer in Britain. In 2012, Vogue listed her among their list of 100 Inspirational Women and, in 2017, Evening Standard included her in their list of London's most influential people. Kelly also appears on QVC UK, showcasing her exclusive QVC K by Kelly Hoppen range of jewellery and homewares.

In 2021, it was announced that Hoppen would be designing the initial 10 homes aboard the unique superyacht Njord, a 948 ft cruise ship built by German shipbuilder Meyer Werft. The superyacht is built to house as many as 117 individual residences on board, with potentially hundreds of full-time residents.

In 2021, Hoppen was included in Architectural Digest China's AD 100 list, which recognized her as among the top 100 most influential architects and designers working in China. She has also been named among the top 100 designers in the 2022 LuxDeco 100.

=== Television ===
In 2011, Hoppen presented her own show on Channel 5 called Superior Interiors with Kelly Hoppen. Hoppen was a dragon on BBC Two's Dragons' Den from 2013 to 2015. In 2016, Kelly had a cameo appearance in Absolutely Fabulous: The Movie.

Hoppen appeared as a guest judge on the final episode of the third series of BBC Two's The Great Interior Design Challenge. In 2017, she replaced Sophie Robinson as a judge alongside Daniel Hopwood for series four.

== Honours and awards ==
In 1996, Hoppen was awarded the Andrew Martin Interior Design Award by Andrew Martin International. She has subsequently won a number of other awards including European Woman Of Achievement in 2007, ELLE Decoration Award and Grazia Designer of the Year.

Hoppen was appointed Member of the Order of the British Empire (MBE) in the 2009 New Year Honours for services to interior design. Hoppen is an Ambassador for the Prince's Trust, the Government's GREAT campaign and now works with UK Trade & Investment and other parts the government, as an adviser and mentor to small businesses. She is also an Ambassador for rainforest charity Cool Earth, alongside Patron Dame Vivienne Westwood, as well as breast cancer charity Future Dreams. She has also worked with Made by Dyslexia and The Diana Award.

In December 2013, Hoppen was awarded the Natwest Everywoman Ambassador award for inspiring young women to excel. On 29 October 2015, Hoppen was listed by UK-based company Richtopia at number 35 in the list of 100 Most Influential British Entrepreneurs.

Hoppen was appointed Commander of the Order of the British Empire (CBE) in the 2020 Birthday Honours for services to the GREAT campaign.

== Personal life ==
Hoppen is dyslexic.

Hoppen has been married twice. Her first marriage was to Graham Corrett from 1982 until 1989. From that marriage, she has one daughter, food writer Natasha Corrett. Her second marriage was to Edwin Miller from 1989 until 2003. From that marriage, she was stepmother to actress Sienna Miller and fashion designer Savannah Miller. Hoppen had a ten-month relationship with ex-England footballer Sol Campbell.

=== News of the World legal action ===
Hoppen lodged a claim against the News of the World and one of its reporters, Dan Evans, for "accessing or attempting to access her voicemail messages between June 2009 and March 2010". Hoppen's case was one of five test cases concerning the hacking of the mobile phones of public figures by the paper due to be brought before the High Court early in 2012. In October 2011, she accepted £60,000 in damages from News International in relation to phone hacking in 2005–2006. No acceptance of liability was made in relation to the allegations against Evans in respect of 2009. Since the settlement, her test case has been replaced by that of footballer Ashley Cole.

== Bibliography ==
Year	Book title	Hoppen's role	Publisher	ISBN
1997	East Meets West : Global Design for Contemporary Interiors	Author	Octopus Publishing Group	978-1-85029-892-2
1997	Table Chic	Author along with Kathy Phillips	HarperCollins Publishers	978-1-85585-438-3
2000	In Touch: Texture in Design	Author	Laurel Glen Publishing	978-1-57145-682-3
2001	Kelly Hoppen Close Up: Attention to Detail in Design	Author along with Helen Chislett	Quadrille Publishing Ltd	978-1-903845-14-1
2002	Monochrome Home: Harmony, Balance, and the Elements of Modern Style	Author along with Helen Chislett	Rizzoli International Publications	978-0-8478-2419-9
2006	Kelly Hoppen Style: The Golden Rules of Design	Author	Little, Brown & Company	978-0-8212-5849-1
2007	Kelly Hoppen Home: From Concept to Reality	Author	Little Brown and Company	978-0-316-11428-8
2011	Kelly Hoppen Interiors: Inspiration and Design Solutions for Stylish, Comfortable Interiors	Author	Rizzoli International Publications	978-0-8478-3575-1
2011	Kelly Hoppen: Ideas: Creating a Home for the Way You Live	Author	Jacqui Small	978-1-906417-48-2
2013	Kelly Hoppen: How to Achieve the Home of Your Dreams	Author	Jacqui Small	978-1-909342-02-6
2016	Kelly Hoppen : The Art of Interior Design	Author	Rizzoli International Publications	978-0-8478-4894-2
2016	House of Hoppen: A Retrospective	Author	Jacqui Small	978-1-910254-50-9
2021	Kelly Hoppen's Essential Style Solutions for Every Home	Author	Frances Lincoln Publishers Ltd	978-0-7112-6230-0

== Filmography ==
Year	Series	Release details	Hoppen's role
2011	Superior Interiors with Kelly Hoppen	Channel 5 (UK)	Presenter
2013–2015	Dragon's Den	BBC 2	Investor / Dragon
2014	The Great Interior Design Challenge	BBC 2	Judge
