= Handmade: Britain's Best Woodworker series 2 =

Handmade: Britain's Best Woodworker
- Season 2
- No. of episodes: 8

Release
- Original network: Channel 4
- Original release: 21 September – 9 November 2022

Series chronology
- ← Previous; Series 1 Next → Series 3

The second series of Handmade: Britain's Best Woodworker started on 21 September 2022 and aired for eight episodes concluding on 9 November 2022. The series was hosted by Mel Giedroyc and there were two new judges, Tom Dyckhoff and Sophie Sellu. Filming took place at the Glanusk Estate in the Brecon Beacons National Park.

== Woodworkers ==
Woodworker	Age	Occupation	Hometown
Amina	39	Academic developer	Greater Manchester
Ashley	31	Payroll assistant	Lancashire
Calum	31	3D designer	Glasgow
Chloe	21	Student	Brighton
Dafydd	47	Civil servant	Bridgend
Jacob	22	Caretaker	Norfolk
Lauren	35	Landscape architect technician	Kent
Russell	36	Kitchen Fitter	North London
Sarah	45	Consultant	Kent
Tanya	46	Teacher	London
Tony	51	Graphic designer	Liverpool

== Results and eliminations ==
Elimination chart
Woodworker	1	2	3	4	5	6	7	8
Lauren		WINNER		IMMUNITY	WINNER	WINNER	WINNER	WINNER
Chloe			IMMUNITY					RUNNER-UP
Jacob	WINNER	IMMUNITY	WINNER				IMMUNITY	RUNNER-UP
Ashley					IMMUNITY		OUT	
Russell				WINNER		OUT		
Tanya					OUT			
Dafydd				OUT				
Sarah			OUT					
Tony	IMMUNITY	OUT						
Calum								
Amina	OUT							

Colour key:

Woodworker got through to the next round.
Woodworker was eliminated.
Woodworker did not participate.
Woodworker won immunity from elimination.
Woodworker of the week.
Woodworker won both immunity from elimination and woodworker of the week.
Woodworker was a series runner-up.
Woodworker was the series winner.

== Episodes ==
Woodworker eliminated
Woodworker of the week
Woodworker won immunity
Winner

=== Episode 1 ===
The Big Build was to make a six place dining table, inspired by a country. The Bespoke Brief was to do cut a design into a veneer, which was then fitted to a lightbox.

Woodworker	Big Build (Dining Table)	Skills Test (Veneer Cutting)
Amina	Egyptian Themed Table	
Calum	Basque Cheesecake Table	
Chloe	Italian Arches Table	
Dafydd	Welsh Daffodil Table	
Jacob	Swedish Style Table	
Lauren	Pyramid Themed Table	
Russell	Viking Table	
Sarah	La Boca Table	
Tanya	Giant's Causeway Table	
Tony	Punjabi Lattice Low Table	IMMUNITY

=== Episode 2 ===
The woodworkers were asked to make a wooden decorative clock, inspired by a time in their life. From this episode, woodworker Calum did not continue in the series, with his place being taken by Ashley.

Woodworker	Big Build (Decorative Clock)	Skills Test (Wooden Roses)
Ashley	Bee Themed Clock	
Chloe	Nature Inspired Clock	
Dafydd	BSL Clock	
Jacob	Game Themed Clock	IMMUNITY
Lauren	IVF Inspired Clock	
Russell	Engine Clock	
Sarah	Skiing Clock	
Tanya	Bango Clock	
Tony	Robot Clock	

=== Episode 3 ===
The woodworkers were asked to make a wooden decorative clock, inspired by a time in their life.

Woodworker	Big Build (Decorative Clock)	Skills Test (Welsh Lovespoon)
Ashley	Push-along Ice Cream Toy Cart	
Chloe	Rocking Seahorse	IMMUNITY
Dafydd	Model Biplane	
Jacob	Child's Workbench	
Lauren	Italian-styled Moped	
Russell	Ferris Wheel Toy	
Sarah	Woodland Potion Kitchen	
Tanya	Time Machine	

=== Episode 4 ===
Seven remaining woodworkers must create a bespoke day bed inspired by an art or design movement, and master the decorative art of pyrography by scorching a portrait of Mel Giedroyc onto wood.

Woodworker	Big Build (Daybed)	Skills Test (Pyrography)
Ashley	Arts & Crafts Daybed	
Chloe	Art Nouveau Daybed	
Dafydd	Art Deco Daybed	
Jacob	Mid-Century Daybed	
Lauren	Ibiza Daybed	IMMUNITY
Russell	OpArt Daybed	
Tanya	Flatpack Daybed	

=== Episode 5 ===
The remaining six woodworkers face their biggest build yet as they create a sea-inspired sculpture from a fallen tree trunk.

Woodworker	Big Build (Daybed)	Skills Test (Pole Lathe-turned Tops)
Ashley	Ammonite Fossil on a Rock	IMMUNITY
Chloe	Sealife Column	
Jacob	Oyster Shell	
Lauren	Emperor Penguin	
Russell	Courting Seahorses	
Tanya	Sea Throne	

=== Episode 6 ===
For the week's Big Build challenge, the five remaining woodworkers must create a stylish rocking chair with a modern twist. Everyone's keen to secure immunity by building the best bird box.

Woodworker	Big Build (Rocking Chair)	Skills Test (Bird Box)
Ashley	Tub-style Rocking Chair	
Chloe	Swan-inspired Rocking Chair	
Jacob	Mid-Century Rocking Chair	
Lauren	Hoop Rocking Chair	IMMUNITY
Russell	Sideway Rocking Chair	

=== Episode 7: Semi-Final ===
Mel Giedroyc tasks the four remaining woodworkers to carve a bespoke desk and wooden vase for a place in the final. But who will have a good day at the office and who will be told to work from home?

Woodworker	Big Build (Bespoke Desk)	Skills Test (Wooden Vase)
Ashley	Minimalist Desk	
Chloe	Organic Shaped Desk	
Jacob	French Style Desk	IMMUNITY
Lauren	Birch Ply Desk	

=== Episode 8: Final ===
The three remaining woodworkers must create a home bar. It has to be dramatic, sophisticated and at least one-metre tall. Then they must design & carve out a sympathetic bar sign.

Woodworker	Big Build (Home Bar)	Skills Test (Bespoke Bar Sign)
Chloe	Nature's Nectar	
Jacob	Raise The Bar	
Lauren	Never Been Nailed	
