= The Great Interior Design Challenge =

- Genre: Factual
- Presented by: Tom Dyckhoff
- Country of origin: United Kingdom
- Original language: English
- No. of series: 4
- No. of episodes: 52

Production
- Executive producers: Tanya Shaw; Alannah Richardson
- Running time: 60 minutes
- Production company: Studio Lambert

Original release
- Network: BBC Two; BBC Two HD
- Release: 20 January 2014 – 19 January 2017

The Great Interior Design Challenge is a British television interior design competition broadcast on BBC Two from 20 January 2014 to 19 January 2017. Each series aims to find "Britain's best amateur interior designers". All programmes in the first three series have been presented by Tom Dyckhoff with the design tasks judged by Daniel Hopwood and Sophie Robinson. Interior designer Kelly Hoppen replaced Robinson as lead judge in series four, with Robinson becoming a guest judge along with Michelle Ogundehin, Elle Magazine's Decoration UK editor-in-chief. Each episode introduces a new location with distinctive architecture and focuses on a few participants at a time. Contestants have a main challenge – usually to make-over a room in the home of their allocated client – and an additional small task – such as the upcycling of an old item.

== Production ==
The commissioning of the series was announced by Tanya Shaw and Alison Kirkham and the executive producers are Tanya Shaw for the BBC and Alannah Richardson for Studio Lambert.

The presenter Tom Dyckhoff is a design critic of The Times. In the first three series, experienced interior designers Daniel Hopwood and Sophie Robinson judge and give expert opinions. Interior designer Kelly Hoppen replaced Robinson as lead judge in series four.

== Series overview ==
Series	Episodes	Originally released	
Series	Episodes	First released	Last released
1	12	20 January 2014	5 February 2014
2	16	28 October 2014	2 December 2014
3	15	1 February 2016	2 March 2016
4	9	3 January 2017	19 January 2017

== Episode list ==
=== Series 1 (2014) ===
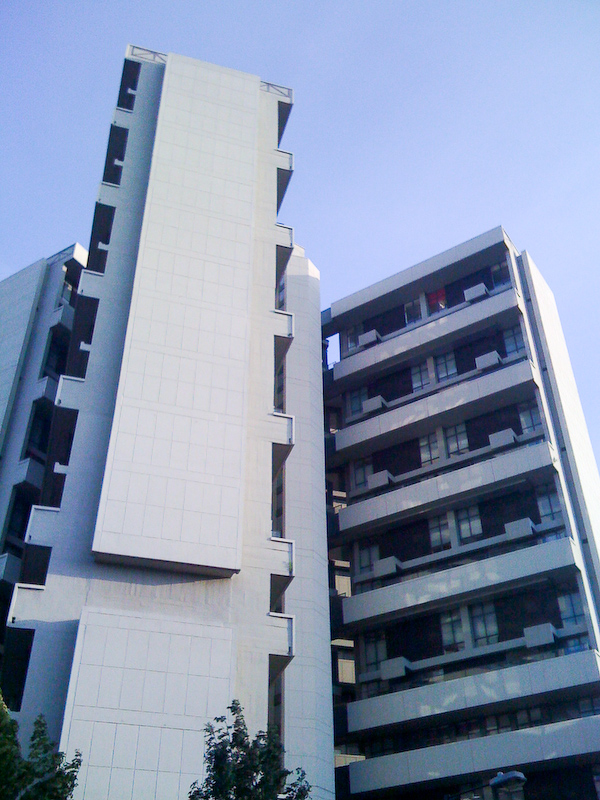
Keeling House, Bethnal Green, the location for episode 10 in the first series

No. overall	No. in series	Title	Original release date	UK viewers (millions)
1	1	"Edwardian - Muswell Hill"	20 January 2014	1.45
2	2	"Victorian - Salford"	21 January 2014	1.72
3	3	"Art Deco - Beckenham"	22 January 2014	1.64
4	4	"Converted Industrial - Rotherhithe"	23 January 2014	1.69
5	5	"Span - Ashtead"	24 January 2014	1.51
6	6	"Almshouses - Southwark"	27 January 2014	1.66
7	7	"1930s - Surbiton"	28 January 2014	1.87
8	8	"Regency - Brighton"	29 January 2014	1.65
9	9	"Thatched Cottages - Dorset"	30 January 2014	2.06
10	10	"Brutalist Tower Block - Bethnal Green"	31 January 2014	1.42
11	11	"Victorian - Birmingham: Semi-Final"	4 February 2014	2.14
12	12	"Georgian - Liverpool: Final"	5 February 2014	1.87

=== Series 2 (2014) ===
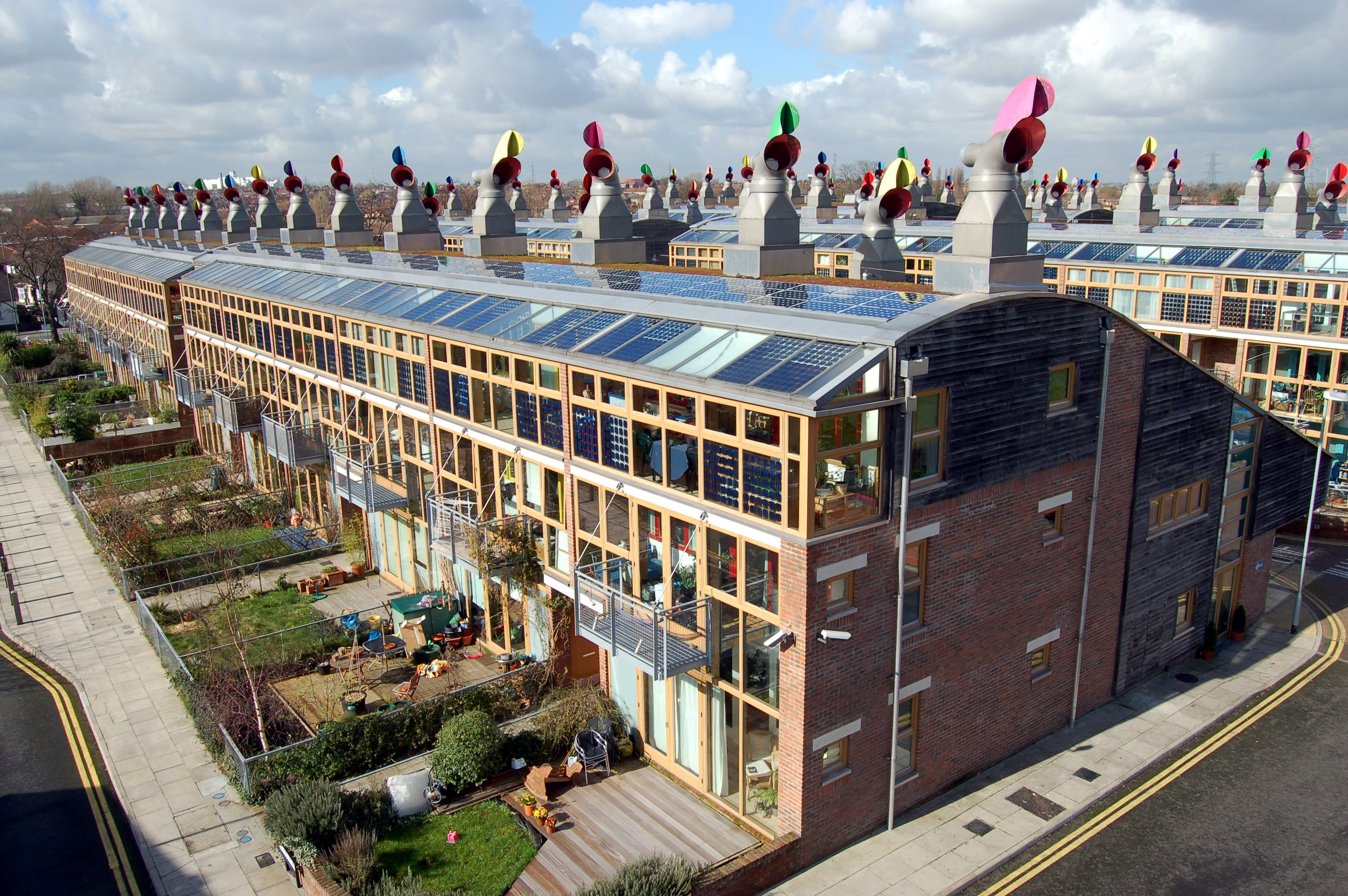
BedZED - the location for Episode 7

No. overall	No. in series	Title	Original release date	UK viewers (millions)	BBC Two weekly rank
13	1	"Cotswolds"	28 October 2014	1.36	27
14	2	"Beach Huts - Canford Cliffs"	29 October 2014	1.33	30
15	3	"Medieval - Lavenham"	4 November 2014	1.60	20
16	4	"Victorian London"	30 October 2014	1.78	17
17	5	"Fishermen's Cottages - Brixham"	5 November 2014	1.76	20
18	6	"Welwyn Garden City"	6 November 2014	1.76	19
19	7	"Eco Homes (BedZED) - London Borough of Sutton"	11 November 2014	1.54	20
20	8	"Port Sunlight"	12 November 2014	1.58	18
21	9	"1930s Apartments - West London"	13 November 2014	1.77	16
22	10	"Oast Houses - Kent"	18 November 2014	1.89	14
23	11	"Edwardian - Wimbledon"	19 November 2014	1.65	20
24	12	"Houseboats - River Thames"	20 November 2014	1.82	17
25	13	"1960s Complex"	25 November 2014	2.02	11
26	14	"School Conversion"	26 November 2014	1.67	22
27	15	"Tenements - Edinburgh: Semi-Final"	27 November 2014	1.99	13
28	16	"Stately Home - Cumbria: Final"	2 December 2014	2.12	9

=== Series 3 (2016) ===
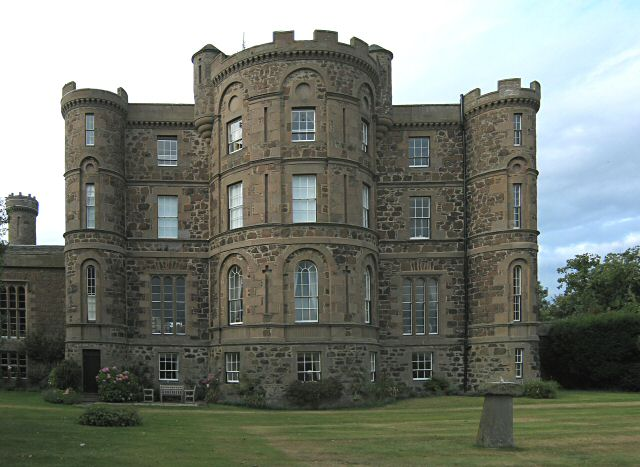
Pitfour Castle featured in series three

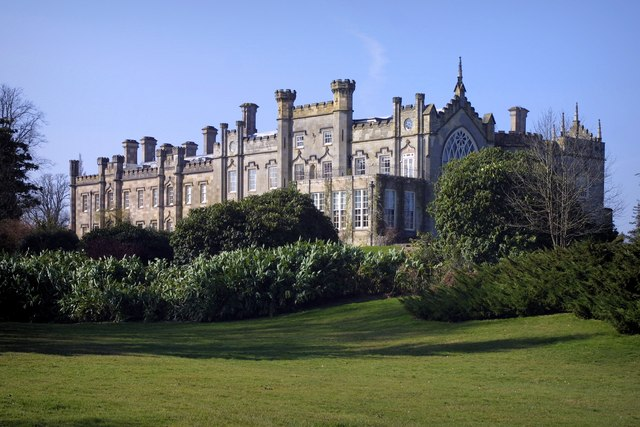
Sheffield Park House, the location for the final of series three

No. overall	No. in series	Title	Original release date	UK viewers (millions)	BBC Two weekly rank
29	1	"Converted Leisure Centre - London"	1 February 2016	N/A	TBA
30	2	"Weatherboard Cottages - Kent"	2 February 2016	1.82	12
31	3	"Scottish Castle"	3 February 2016	1.44	23
32	4	"Thatched Village - Briantspuddle"	8 February 2016	1.61	22
33	5	"Georgian Terrace - Bath"	9 February 2016	1.90	13
34	6	"Timber-Framed Houses - Robertsbridge"	10 February 2016	1.85	15
35	7	"Peak District - Tissington"	15 February 2016	1.82	11
36	8	"Half Houses - Walthamstow"	16 February 2016	1.88	9
37	9	"Modern Riverside - Marlow"	17 February 2016	1.81	12
38	10	"Self Build - South London"	22 February 2016	1.87	9
39	11	"Bournville - Birmingham"	23 February 2016	1.98	8
40	12	"Farm Houses - North Yorkshire"	24 February 2016	1.81	10
41	13	"Coastal Cottages - Beer"	29 February 2016	2	10
42	14	"Medieval Cottages - Wells: Semi-Final"	1 March 2016	2.08	5
43	15	"Stately Home - Sussex: Final"	2 March 2016	2.03	8

=== Series 4 (2017) ===
No. overall	No. in series	Title	Original release date	UK viewers (millions)	BBC Two weekly rank
44	1	"Regency - Pittville, Cheltenham"	3 January 2017	2.4	5
45	2	"Model Village - Saltaire"	4 January 2017	2.09	11
46	3	"Gothic Revival - Highgate"	5 January 2017	2	14
47	4	"Mock Tudor Houses - Worsley"	10 January 2017	2.2	6
48	5	"Georgian Houses - Aberaeron"	11 January 2017	2.2	7
49	6	"Art Deco Flats - Streatham"	12 January 2017	2.11	9
50	7	"Modernist - Hotwells, Bristol"	17 January 2017	2.29	4
51	8	"Thatched - Ashby St Ledgers"	18 January 2017	2.21	5
52	9	"Converted Castle Apartments - Broadstairs"	19 January 2017	2.15	6

== See also ==
- The Apartment
- Changing Rooms
