= Saving Britain's Past =

- Region 2 DVD artwork
- Genre: Factual
- Presented by: Tom Dyckhoff
- Country of origin: United Kingdom
- No. of series: 1
- No. of episodes: 7 (list of episodes)

Production
- Executive producer: Basil Comely
- Producer: Mary Sackville-West
- Running time: 30 minutes

Original release
- Network: BBC Two; BBC Two HD
- Release: 24 August – 12 October 2009

Saving Britain's Past is a British factual television series presented by Tom Dyckhoff that was first broadcast on BBC Two on 20 January 2009.

== Production ==
Rodney Harrison and Susie West (from the Open University were academic consultants to the show. Later they used the DVD of the show to create a module 'Understanding Global Heritage' as part of a Heritage Studies course for the university.

Episode 1 included the City of Bath; episode 2, Park Hill, Sheffield; episode 3, Eastnor Castle; and episode 4, Covent Garden.

== Reviews ==
"Tom Dyckhoff has a rather dry style, which didn't exactly make the most of the subject matter. Though there were some intriguing snippets of information, this wasn't really the most accessible format for the general viewer". Was one review of the show.

"Dyckhoff emphasises the "battles" with breathless superlatives. Instead, some major issues of conservation are intelligently aired: the conflict between heritage and environmentalism in retaining traditional rural land management; or that conservation of the physical doesn't necessarily include the community".

== Episode list ==
No.	Title	Original release date	UK viewers (millions)
1	"The City"	24 August 2009	1.57
2	"Streets in the Sky"	31 August 2009	TBA
3	"The Country House"	7 September 2009	TBA
4	"The Market"	14 September 2009	TBA
5	"The Pit"	21 September 2009	TBA
6	"The Crofters"	28 September 2009	TBA
7	"The Street"	12 October 2009	TBA

Later released as a DVD running 420 mins.
