= Landward =

- Presented by: Dougie Vipond
- Starring: Anne McAlpine; Arlene Stuart
- Country of origin: Scotland

Production
- Running time: 30 minutes approx.
- Production company: BBC Studios Documentary Unit

Original release
- Network: BBC One Scotland; BBC Scotland
- Release: 3 April 1976 – present

Landward is a long-running Scottish television programme focusing on agricultural and rural issues, produced and broadcast by BBC Scotland.

== Overview ==
BBC Scotland had first produced its own farming programme, Farm Forum, in 1965. This was broadcast on a monthly basis as an opt-out from the BBC's Farming programme, in order to concentrate on issues relevant to Scottish farmers. In 1976 an increase in the output of farming and rural affairs programming led to the introduction of Landward. The issues which Landward addresses are generally those within the rural public consciousness of Scotland, itself a country with a large farming community. Additionally, the show features stories covering Scotland's vast landscape, with various stories covering the wildlife and nature of the country.

From 1976 until 2007, it aired Sunday lunchtime, replacing the similar shows Farming and then later Countryfile which aired elsewhere in the UK; In 2007 Landward moved to a regular Friday evening slot, and replaced Countryfile only when it could not be shown in its usual slot (e.g. because of sports coverage). From April 2009, both programmes now have guaranteed prime time slots and one will no longer be dropped to accommodate the other.

=== Presenters ===
The current presenter is Dougie Vipond, who took over the role in April 2009.

- Ross Muir (1976 – 1990s)
- Ken Rundle (1990s – 2007)
- Nick Nairn (2007–2009)
- Dougie Vipond (2009 – onwards)

=== Reporters ===
- John Harle (1970's)
- Ben Coutts (1970's – 1980's)
- Dan Buglass (1980's)
- Sarah Mack (2007–2017)
- Eric Robson (1980s – 1990s)
- Euan McIlwraith (1991 to 2021)
- Nick Nairn (Current)
- Anne McAlpine (Since 2017)
- Shahbaz Majeed (Since 2021)

Other reporters sometimes appear on a short-term basis, typically to present a series of reports on a given subject over a few weeks. Lee McKenzie and Amanda Hamilton have been semi-regular fill-in reporters in 2010–11. The programme formerly included a five-day Landward Weather forecast, usually presented by one of the BBC Scotland forecasters, however in 2014 the forecast was made available exclusively on the Landward website, and subsequently discontinued.
