= Anne McAlpine =

Scottish broadcaster

- Anne NicAilpein
- Born: 5 May 1986 (age 40); Stornoway, Outer Hebrides, Scotland
- Education: University of the Highlands and Islands
- Occupation: News presenter
- Employer: BBC
- Known for: Reporting Scotland; Landward; Scotland's Home of the Year
- Television: Eòrpa; Landward; An Là; Reporting Scotland
- Spouse: Ken McAlpine (m. 2022)

Anne McAlpine (née Morrison; previously Lundon) is a Scottish journalist, newsreader and weather presenter working for BBC Alba and BBC Scotland. She is best known for presenting Reporting Scotland and Landward, and narrating Scotland's Home of the Year.

McAlpine additionally presents many Scottish Gaelic-language programmes, including Èorpa, An Là, An Cuan Sgith (The Minch), and An t-Uisge/Rain stories.

== Early life and education ==
McAlpine was brought up as the youngest of four girls in a tight-knit Scottish Gaelic-speaking community in Newmarket, Lewis in the Outer Hebrides of Scotland. McAlpine is considered very musical, playing the chanter and bagpipes until 14 when she sustained a mouth injury. She then took up the guitar and piano. After starting a law degree in Glasgow, McAlpine graduated from the University of the Highlands and Islands with a degree in Gaelic, History & Philosophy, which got her into Gaelic broadcasting.

== Career ==
Anne McAlpine first began her broadcasting career as a contributor to the Scottish Gaelic-language BBC programme Dè a-Nis?,. McAlpine realised her aim of becoming a Gaelic newsreader/broadcaster at this stage, and continued to progress her career with independent production company MNE Media.

With the emergence of BBC Alba, McAlpine became a main presenter of the European current affairs programme Eòrpa, as well as taking on roles presenting various other programmes including An Là and the Scottish Gaelic-language weather.

As the broadcaster's career progressed, she became an English-language presenter for late bulletins of Reporting Scotland on Wednesdays, Thursdays and Fridays, as well as for BBC Scotland's rural affairs programme Landward. Since 2019, McAlpine has narrated Scotland's Home of the Year.

On radio, McAlpine hosts the Gaelic-language drive time show Aithris an Fheasgair on BBC Radio nan Gàidheal four times a week.

Anne McAlpine has fronted several of her own shows for BBC Alba. In 2017, McAlpine toured the North Coast 500 in a Volkswagen Beetle for her programme North Coast 500 - Le Anne Lundon. In 2021, she presented An Cuan Sgith (The Minch), a six-part series produced for BBC Alba in which The Minch, a strait separating mainland Scotland and the western isles, is explored. McAlpine similarly presented An t-Uisge/Rain Stories, a BBC Alba series discovering the influence of rain in culture and tradition in 2022.

McAlpine is based at BBC Scotland's headquarters known as Pacific Quay in Glasgow.

== Personal life ==
In February 2022 Anne married Ken McAlpine, a cameraman whom she met working on Èorpa. He is a former member of the 90's Britpop band The Supernaturals. They live in the West End of Glasgow, overlooking Kelvingrove Park.

In 2007, McAlpine represented the Western Isles in football as a defender at the 2007 Island Games in Rhodes, Greece.

In January 2026, Robert Green, a 71-year-old, was found guilty of stalking McAlpine for nearly four years. Green loitered repeatedly outside her home and sent unsolicited mail and gifts. The experience left her, she said, feeling "terrified, exposed and vulnerable".
