= Tosca Reno =

Canadian health writer (born 1959)

- Born: Tosca Reno; May 22, 1959 (age 67); Lachine, Quebec, Canada
- Children: 4 children

Tosca Reno (born May 22, 1959) is a Canadian author and wellness professional. She is the author of Your Best Body Now and the Eat-Clean Diet series. Your Best Body Now appeared on The New York Times Best Seller list for 41 weeks. Her books focus on nutrition, exercise, and lifestyle.

Reno is the author of 18 books, including the Eat-Clean Diet series, which has sold more than four million copies and has been published in multiple languages. She is a certified Nutritional Therapy Practitioner.

== Personal life ==
=== Personal life ===
Reno was married to publisher and author Robert Kennedy, who founded Robert Kennedy Publishing in 1974 with the launch of MuscleMag International. Kennedy was also an artist and art teacher. Reno and Kennedy met in 2000, when Reno was teaching Kennedy's daughter.[1] They later married. Kennedy died of lung cancer on April 12, 2012.[2]

Following Kennedy's death, Reno became publisher and chief executive officer of Robert Kennedy Publishing.[3]

Reno has four daughters.

== Publishing ==
Reno began her writing career as a monthly columnist for Oxygen magazine. She went on to publish 18 books through Robert Kennedy Publishing, including titles in the Eat-Clean Diet series. In 2010, her book Your Best Body Now: Look and Feel Fabulous at Any Age the Eat-Clean Way appeared on The New York Times Best Seller list, where it remained for 41 weeks.

== Television ==
Tosca was featured in a mini-reality series called Tosca: Flexing at 49 in 2009. The eight-part series focused on her preparations for the final bodybuilding competition of her career and won her a Gemini Award. The series aired on the Viva Network in Canada in June 2009.

== Published works ==
"The Pan-G Non-Surgical Face Lift" (2006)

- The Butt Book (2007)
- The Eat-Clean Diet Book (2007)
- The Eat-Clean Diet Cookbook (2007)
- The Eat-Clean Diet Workout (2008)
- The Eat-Clean Diet Workout Journal (2008)
- The Eat-Clean Diet for Family and Kids (2008)
- The Eat-Clean Diet for Men (2009)
- The Eat-Clean Diet Companion (2009)
- Tosca Reno's Eat Clean Cookbook (2009)
- The Eat-Clean Diet Recharged (2009)
- Your Best Body Now (2009)
- The Eat-Clean Diet Stripped (2011)
- The Eat-Clean Diet Vegetarian Cookbook (2012)
- "Just the Rules" (2012)
- "The Start Here Diet" (2013)

== See also ==
- Clean eating
- List of diets
