= Isle of Mull Cheddar =

Scottish variety of cheddar cheese

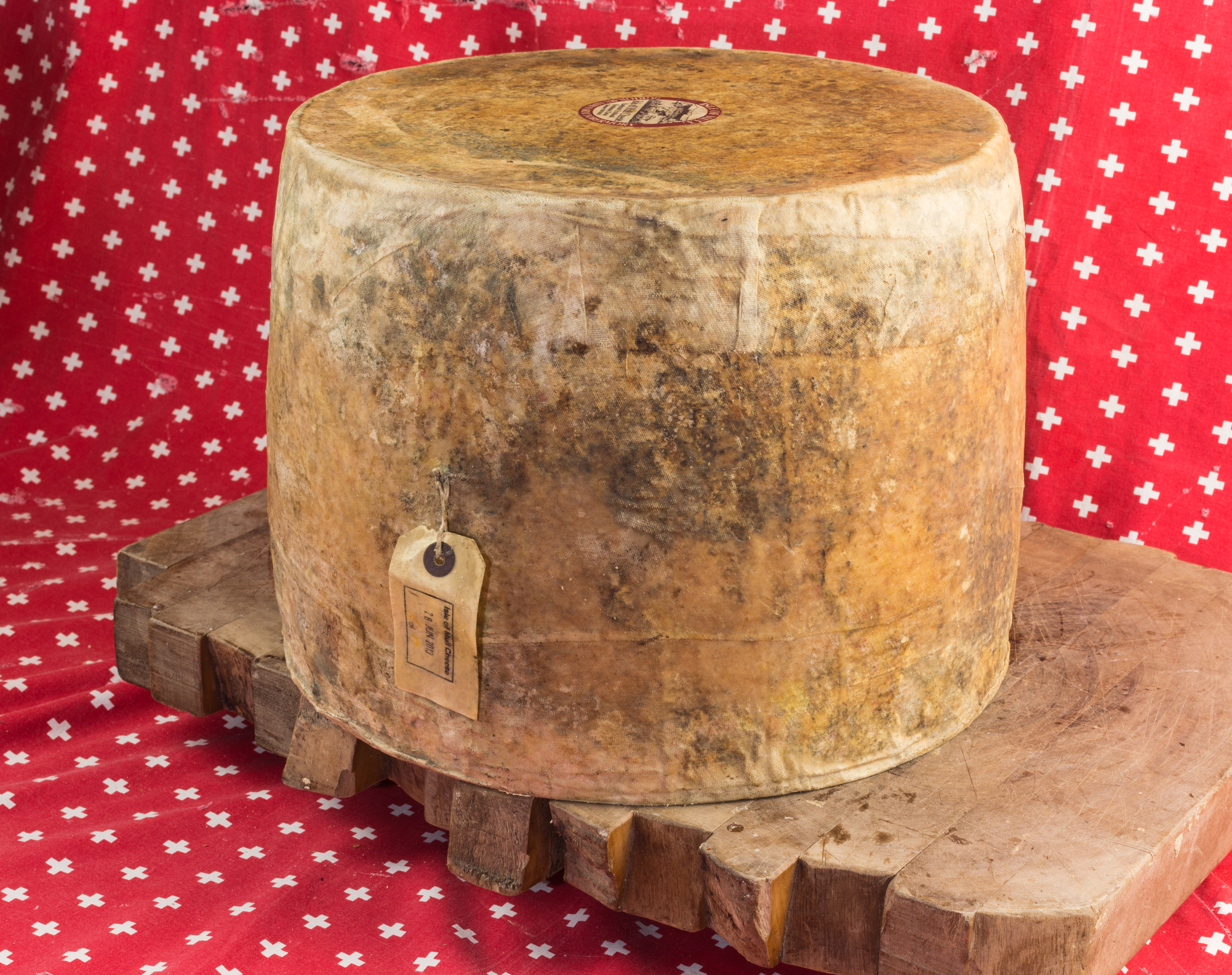
- Country of origin: Scotland
- Region: Argyll and Bute
- Town: Tobermory
- Source of milk: Cows
- Pasteurised: No
- Texture: Crumbly
- Aging time: 12 months
- Named after: Isle of Mull

Isle of Mull Cheddar is a very sharp white cheddar cheese with a blue vein, from the Isle of Mull in Scotland. It is made from unpasteurised milk.

== Production ==
The cows on the Sgriob-ruadh farm are grass-reared with fermented grain from the nearby Tobermory distillery also used for fodder. Milk is taken directly to the cheesemaking vats without being pasteurised. The ivory colour of the cheese is lighter than many other cheddars and there are some blue veins at the edges, with a taste that is slightly nuttier that other cheddars.

Jeff and Chris Reade began production of the cheese in the 1980s, with their sons later becoming involved. After Jeff's death in April 2013, his memory was honoured at the British Cheese awards. In 2003, the herd was predominantly Friesian cows.
