= The Abandoned Soldier =

Sculpture by James Napier

The Abandoned Soldier (TAS)
- Artist: James Napier
- Year: 2007
- Type: Resin
- Location: Cardiff Castle

The Abandoned Soldier is a sculpture created in 2007 by sculptor James Napier that was modelled after British ex-soldier Lance Corporal Daniel Twiddy.

== History ==
The sculpture The Abandoned Soldier (TAS) was made for the BBC documentary Power to the People to be erected in Trafalgar Square, and made an appearance on Newsnight as well as the front page of the Independent newspaper. TAS was initially housed at Combat Stress, a charitable organisation for ex-servicemen and women, before being moved with the help of the Royal Electrical and Mechanical Engineers to the National Memorial Arboretum in Staffordshire to launch The Abandoned Soldier Project. The sculpture has subsequently been moved to Cardiff Castle, then to Exeter Castle for the War Art Exhibition in June 2011, and was filmed as part of a Channel 5 documentary. From there it was moved to the Rhondda Heritage Park at Trehafod.

In April 2012, the sculpture was moved back to Cardiff Castle as a permanent 'base'. In the Summer of 2013, the head piece was removed from the base and taken on a tour of Wales. The high points included; The summit of Mount Snowdon and Portmeirion. In May 2014 the sculpture was part of an installation by Themis Jones, installed at the Hay Festival of Literature and Art. In July 2014 he returned to his main 'base' at Cardiff Castle and will stand as a lasting reminder of the trauma of War, until 2018. Finally on the Remembrance weekend in November 2019, the sculpture was fully donated to Firing Line museum and now comes under their care.

== Interpretation ==
The statue was created in remembrance of soldiers who suffer 'PTSD' from armed conflicts and military service. The sculpture was modelled after Lance Corporal Daniel Twiddy, who had been wounded in 2003 by friendly fire and shrapnel while in Basra. Twiddy had received several wounds from shrapnel, which included wounds to the face from a 'Blue on Blue' incident. Since the sculpture toured Wales, there have been many interpretations produced within an Art Collection. This collection was broken up but some items remain in the care of Cardiff Castle. This also includes the poetry created by poet Mark Christmas 'The Abandoned Soldier Reflections of War'.

== Conservation ==
In 2010, concerns were raised regarding the stability of the sculpture and the potential disintegration of the resin material. There were also discussions about the sculpture's lack of a permanent display location. In November 2019, the sculpture was fully donated to Firing Line museum and is now under their care. There have been attempts at petitioning for a more permanent, bronze version of the statue to remember PTSD as the curse of the Servicemen and Women of our Country and many others around the world [1] .

The sculpture now has a piece of music, commissioned by the TAS Project, written and sung by Bethan Myfanwy Hughes, a civilian trauma nurse and also a member of the Territorial Army.
