= The Culture Show =

- Created by: BBC Productions
- Directed by: Various
- Presented by: Various
- Country of origin: United Kingdom
- Original language: English

Production
- Editor: Janet Lee
- Running time: 30 minutes

Original release
- Network: BBC Two
- Release: 11 November 2004 – 24 January 2015

The Culture Show is a British magazine programme about books, art, film, architecture, music, visual fashion and the performing arts. The show was broadcast weekly on BBC Two between 2004 and 2015.

== Early history ==
Launched in November 2004, the show initially transmitted on Thursday nights in a 7 p.m. slot, lasting 60 minutes. The first main presenter was Verity Sharp, though she shared presenting duties in the show's first run with Kwame Kwei-Armah and Andrew Graham-Dixon. The first series included segments on film director Martin Scorsese, the conductor and pianist Daniel Barenboim, the then little-known indie rock group Kaiser Chiefs and the contemporary visual artist Anselm Kiefer, among others. The launch editor, George Entwistle, was previously editor of BBC Two's flagship current affairs programme Newsnight.

Entwistle was succeeded as editor by Edward Morgan in summer 2005. In May 2006, the show was moved to Saturday nights, shortened to 50 minutes, and began to be regularly presented by Lauren Laverne. The programme then also started to make occasional spin-off specials, which have so far included an hour-long interview with Steven Spielberg on the occasion of his 60th birthday; a programme exploring the work of Michael Palin; and interviews with Lou Reed and Arcade Fire. In January 2010, the team produced a successful one-hour special to cover the launch of BBC Radio 4's A History of the World in 100 Objects.

== Presenters ==
The main presenters have changed since the programme's launch. After a long period with Laverne as anchor, by January 2010 the main presenter role had switched back to Andrew Graham-Dixon. Other regular presenters and reporters have included Mark Kermode, Tom Dyckhoff, Clemency Burton-Hill, Mark Radcliffe, Tim Samuels, Matthew Sweet, Lauren Laverne, Annie Mac, and Danny Robbins.

Guest presenters in the 2006/07 series included Stewart Lee, who interviewed his hero, the comedian Ted Chippington; Frank Skinner, who met singer Mark E. Smith for the show; author Grace Dent, who watches television in her caravan; Guardian television columnist Charlie Brooker, who criticised Saturday night talent shows; and Russell Brand who presented a segment on Oxford University. On occasion, editions of the programme have been presented by Sue Perkins.

== Guests ==
Under the editorship of Edward Morgan, each edition of the programme featured at least one live performance from a musical artist. Musical guests who performed on the show in the 2006/07 season included Field Music, Babyshambles, Manic Street Preachers, Underworld, Mika, Faithless, Jarvis Cocker, Sting, Carlos Acosta, Bryan Ferry, Antony and the Johnsons, Paul McCartney and The Tiger Lillies.

== Broadcasts ==
From 3 June 2008, the programme moved into the 10pm Tuesday slot, previously occupied by Later With Jools Holland, with an extended edition shown on Thursdays at 11.20pm. From inception, the show was jointly based in London and BBC Pacific Quay in Glasgow. The show was broadcast in HD from late 2009.

The show was quietly ended in 2015, after a final special episode broadcast on 24 January.

== Format ==
Edward Morgan was succeeded as editor of The Culture Show in Autumn 2009 by Grierson-award-winning Janet Lee, previously the editor of the BBC flagship arts and culture strand Imagine, presented by Alan Yentob. Lee's version of the show reverted to the launch model - 60 minutes long, broadcast at 7pm on Thursdays, pre-recorded with presenters on location and no live music performance.
