= Sophie Robinson (designer) =

British designer and broadcaster

- Education: The Kingsley School, Brighton University
- Occupation(s): Interior stylist, designer, journalist, presenter
- Years active: Since 2000 (journalism)
- Known for: Interior Design Masters The Great Interior Design Challenge, 60 Minute Makeover
- Children: 1
- Website: http://www.sophierobinson.co.uk

Sophie Robinson is a British interior designer and broadcaster. She appears regularly on UK television, including as a guest judge on BBC One’s Interior Design Masters, a judge on BBC 2's The Great Interior Design Challenge, and the presenter of Dream Home Makeovers with Sophie Robinson on Channel 5.

== Education and career ==
Robinson attended Kingsley School in Leamington Spa, Warwickshire. Later, she studied 3D design at Brighton University in the late 1990s, intending to become a product or furniture designer.

After graduating in 1997, Robinson moved to London where she had a workshop at Cockpit Arts, a social enterprise scheme which supports people to grow businesses. She began assisting with interior design projects to help pay her rent, which led to a career working on shopping pages in magazines before her first full-time job as an in-house stylist for the BBC Good Homes magazine from 2000 to 2005.

She then became a freelance interior stylist for eleven years in London before moving back to Sussex where she continues to live and work as a freelance interior designer and broadcaster.

== Television ==
Robinson made her first television appearance as an on-screen designer for ITV's 60 Minute Makeover, where she worked for five years. She subsequently appeared on Channel 5’s Cowboy Builders.

In January 2014, she became one of the judges on BBC 2's The Great Interior Design Challenge. Robinson left the show as lead judge after the third series to spend time with her son, but was a guest judge during the fourth series. She was replaced on the show by interior designer Kelly Hoppen.

She is currently a regular guest judge on BBC One’s Interior Design Masters.

In 2022, Robinson fronted her own TV series, Dream Home Makeovers with Sophie Robinson, on Channel 5.

== Brand collaborations ==
In 2023, Robinson partnered with Harlequin, part of the Sanderson Design Group, to release a collection of fabrics and wallpapers.

In Spring 2025, she launched a range with Dunelm. The collection was a 'maximalist's tool kit' with over 200 products across bedding, furniture, lighting, garden decor, and accessories.

== Personal life ==
Robinson lives in Sussex with her son.

At the age of 21, Robinson became a rally driver after being encouraged by her father to take up the sport, and competed in the British Rally Championship.

== See also ==
- Interior design
