= Michelle Ogundehin =

British author, consultant, and presenter

Michelle Ogundehin is a British magazine editor, creative consultant, TV presenter, and author known for writing and presenting on interior design.

== Biography ==
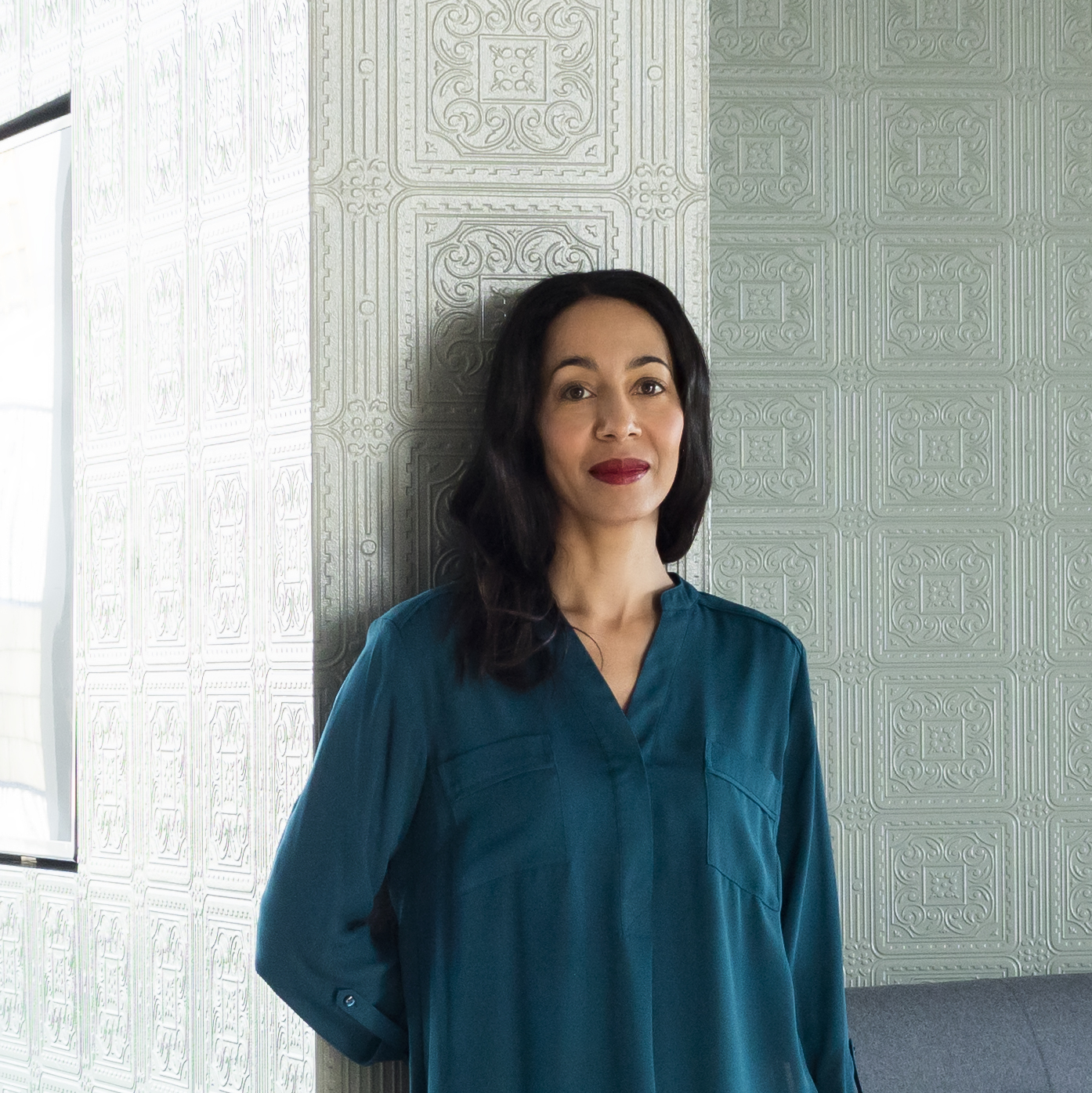
Michelle Ogundehin

Ogundehin was born in Manchester and grew up in London, United Kingdom. She studied architecture at the Bartlett School of Architecture graduating in 1989 with a Bachelors and a further Diploma in Architecture in 1993. Michelle moved to Brighton, after visiting for a weekend break, and has been recognised for her influence by being included in the Powerlist of influential African or African Caribbean Britons on a number of occasions, including in the Top 10 in 2007 and 2008.

In 1997, Ogundehin began working at ELLE Decoration UK, a publication dedicated to interior design, and was appointed Editor-in-Chief in 2004, for which at the 2011 PPA Awards, ELLE Decoration was awarded Specialist Consumer Magazine of the Year and Michelle was Highly Commended as Editor of the Year. In 2002, Ogundehin established her own creative consultancy, MO:Studio. From 2008 to 2015 she became a Trustee for the Victoria & Albert Museum and was made an Ambassador for Diversity in Public Appointments by the Government Equalities Office the following year.

Ogundehin has also regularly written for publications such as the Financial Times and The Observer, and in 2017 she stepped down from her role at ELLE Decoration after 13 years.

In addition to her written work, Ogundehin has worked on a number of television shows including presenting alongside Kevin McCloud on Grand Designs: House of the Year awarding homes across the UK for their architectural merit, been a guest judge on The Great Interior Design Challenge, and in 2019 began presenting as Head Judge on Interior Design Masters in which amateur interior designers compete to win a commercial contract.

Ogundehin's first book, Happy Inside: How to Harness the Power of Home for Health and Happiness, was published in 2020.

== Filmography ==
=== Television ===
Year	Title	Role	Network	Notes
2015, 2017–present	Grand Designs: House of the Year	Herself	Channel 4	Co-Presenter (Series 1, 3–5)
2019–present	Interior Design Masters	Herself	BBC Two/BBC One/Netflix	Head Judge
2017	The Great Interior Design Challenge	Herself	BBC Two	Guest Judge
2016	Inside Out Homes	Herself	Channel 4	Contributor
2016	RHS Chelsea Flower Show	Herself	BBC Two	Co-Presenter
2011	Auction Party	Herself	ITV	Co-Presenter
2011	Newsnight	Herself	BBC Two	Contributor
2011	This Morning's The Next Big Thing	Herself	ITV	Guest Judge

== Bibliography ==
=== Non-fiction ===
- Happy Inside : London: Ebury Press: 2020: ISBN 9781473573062
