= British Institute of Interior Design =

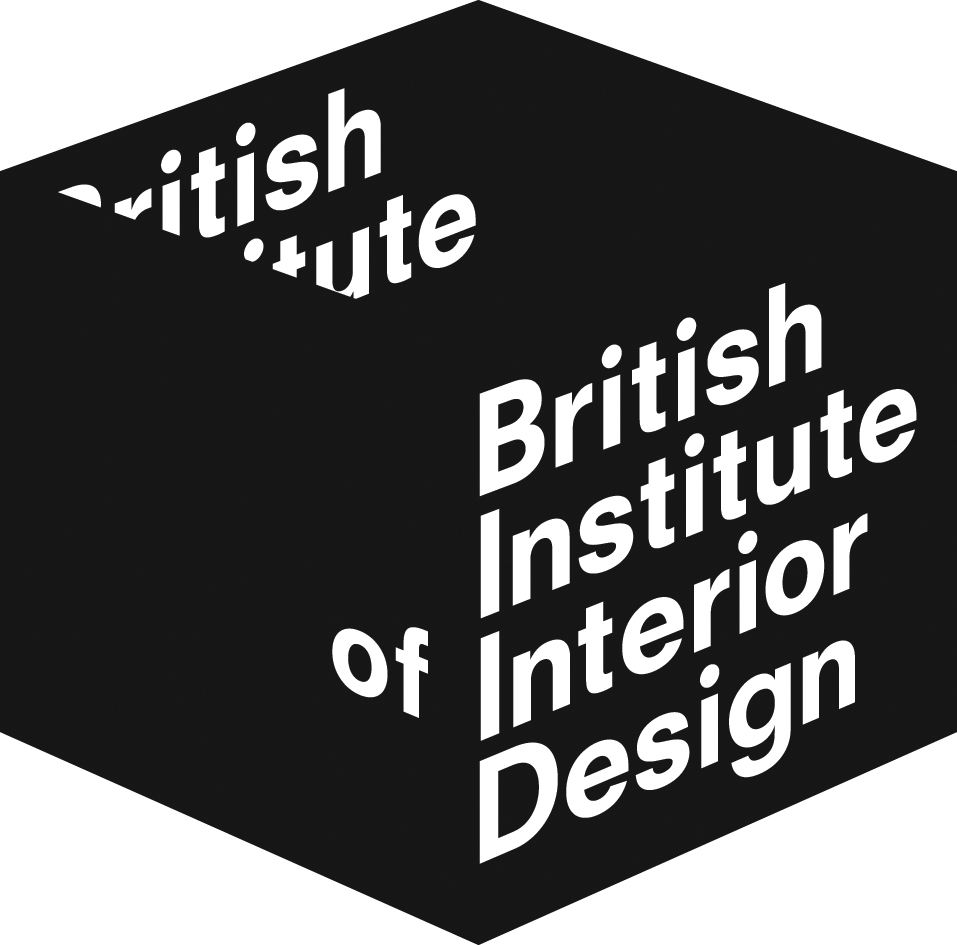

The British Institute of Interior Design (BIID) is the UK's only professional institute for interior designers. The current president of the institute is Liz Bell.

== Establishment ==
Founded in 1965 as the Interior Decorators and Designers Association, it merged in 2002 with the UK chapter of the International Interior Design Association becoming the British Interior Design Association. In 2009, the Secretary of State awarded it Institute status, and it became the British Institute of Interior Design. It remains the only professional membership organisation for the interior design industry in the UK to hold institute status. In 2013, it subsumed the Interior Design Association, a business association representing interior designers working in the commercial sector.

== Conduct ==
The BIID aims to promote professionalism in interior design and to this end has published jointly with the Royal Institute of British Architects (RIBA) the standard form of designer's appointment, ID/05 (updated as ID/10). The Institute has also sponsored the publication of The BIID Interior Design Job Book (also with the RIBA), the first book to set out the procedures for managing an interior design project.

== Associations ==
The BIID is the only interior design body which is a member of the Construction Industry Council the umbrella body for professional organisations in the construction industry. It is also a UK Trade & Investment (UKTI) Design Partner, the government body promoting British services abroad and a member of the International Federation of Interior Architects/Designers, the umbrella body for interior designers worldwide. It is also a member of The Foundation for Science and Technology, a body which provides a platform for debate of policy issues that have a science, engineering or technology element.
