= Anthony Warner (chef) =

British chef, food writer and author (born 1973)

Anthony Warner (born 1973) is a British chef and food writer and the author of the Angry Chef blog. His first book, The Angry Chef, has been seen as a reaction to and debunking of food faddism.

== Early life ==
Anthony Warner was born in 1973. He has a BSc degree in biochemistry from Manchester University.

== Career ==
Warner has worked as a chef for most of his career. He started his food blog The Angry Chef at the end of 2015. In 2016, he sold the rights to his first book The Angry Chef: Bad Science and the Truth About Healthy Eating to Oneworld Publications. It was published in 2017 and has been seen as a reaction to and debunking of food faddism and unscientific advice about food promoted by advocates of "clean eating" and celebrities such as Gwyneth Paltrow.

== Selected publications ==
- The Angry Chef: Bad science and the truth about healthy eating. Oneworld Publications, 2017. ISBN 978-1786072160
- The Angry Chef's Guide to Spotting Bullsh*t in the World of Food. The Experiment, 2018. ISBN 978-1615194605
- The Truth about Fat. Oneworld Publications, 2019 ISBN 978-1786075130
- Ending Hunger:The Quest to Feed the World Without Destroying it. Oneworld Publications, 2021 ISBN 978-0-86154-218-5
