= Interior Design Masters =

British reality competition TV series

- Genre: Reality competition
- Developed by: Amy Ruffell
- Directed by: Diccon Ramsay
- Presented by: Fearne Cotton; Alan Carr
- Judges: Michelle Ogundehin; Weekly guest judge
- Country of origin: United Kingdom
- Original language: English
- No. of series: 7
- No. of episodes: 56

Production
- Executive producers: Claire Walls; Donna Clark
- Producers: Nicky Hammond; Emma Taylor
- Running time: 60 minutes
- Production company: Darlow Smithson Productions

Original release
- Network: BBC Two; BBC One
- Release: 14 August 2019 – present

Interior Design Masters is a British reality competition television series that has been airing since 14 August 2019 first on BBC Two and then since 2022 on BBC One.

== Show format ==
The competition pits 10 amateur interior designers against each other for a chance to win a commercial contract. Each week, a different challenge is set, designed to test their ability to meet various client briefs in different commercial and residential settings. Across the series, the contenders redesign commercial spaces, from shops to restaurants and salons.

== History ==
Under the working title Project Interiors, the show was being developed in August 2018 by Claire Walls, Donna Clark, and Nicky Hammond at Darlow Smithson Productions for BBC Two, originally, in the UK and Netflix in other regions. Interior Design Masters was hosted by presenter Fearne Cotton for one series in 2019, and then from 2021 Alan Carr and judged by former Elle Decoration editor-in-chief Michelle Ogundehin. Michelle is joined by a rotating panel of guest judges, dependent on the weekly brief, such as interior stylist Laurence Llewelyn-Bowen, retail expert Mary Portas and home designer Jade Jagger.

== Series overview ==
Series	Episodes	Premiere	Finale	Winner
1	8	14 August 2019	2 October 2019	Cassie Nicholas
2	8	2 February 2021	23 March 2021	Lynsey Ford
3	8	9 March 2022	27 April 2022	Banjo Beale
4	8	7 March 2023	25 April 2023	Monika Charchula
5	8	12 March 2024	30 April 2024	Roisin Quinn
6	8	10 April 2025	29 May 2025	John Cooper
7	8	21 April 2026	9 June 2026	Lia Gold

=== Series 1 (2019) ===
==== Contestants ====
Contestant	Age	Occupation	Outcome
Cassie Nicholas	31	Antiques dealer	Winner
Frank Newbold	22	Interiors stylist	Runner up
Ju DePaula	40	Interiors consultant	3rd place
Nicki Bamford-Bowes	41	Graphic designer	4th place
Kyle Broughton-Frew	28	Design graduate	5th place
Jerome Gardener	25	Restaurant manager	6th place
Verity Coleman	34	Retired army officer	7th/8th place
Terian Tilston	30	Solicitor	7th/8th place
Trish Coggans	54	Social worker	9th place
Jim Biddulph	32	Design writer	10th place

==== Results summary ====
Contestant	1	2	3	4	5	6	7	8
Cassie	SAFE	BTM4	HIGH	SAFE	BTM3	WIN	WIN	Winner
Frank	WIN	SAFE	BTM2	SAFE	BTM3	BTM2	BTM2	Runner-up
Ju	LOW	BTM4	WIN	WIN	WIN	WIN	ELIM	
Nicki	BTM3	SAFE	HIGH	BTM3	WIN	ELIM		
Kyle	WIN	WIN	WIN	BTM3	ELIM			
Jerome	BTM3	WIN	BTM2	ELIM				
Verity	WIN	WIN	ELIM					
Terian	SAFE	BTM4	ELIM					
Trish	WIN	ELIM						
Jim	ELIM							

The contestant won Interior Design Masters.
The contestant was the runner-up of Interior Design Masters.
The contestant received the most positive critiques of the week or making part of winning team.
The contestant received positive judges' critiques but was ultimately declared safe.
The contestant received judges' critiques but was ultimately declared safe.
The contestant received negative judges' critiques but was ultimately declared safe.
The contestant was on the bottom for that week.
The contestant was eliminated.

=== Series 2 (2021) ===
==== Contestants ====
Contestant	Age	Occupation	Outcome
Lynsey Ford	36	Architect	Winner
Siobhan Murphy	42	NHS worker	Runner up
Micaela Sharp	33	Upholsterer	Joint 3rd place
Paul Moneypenny	32	Retail manager	Joint 3rd place
Charlotte Beevor	28	Textile designer	5th place
Barbara Ramani	34	Former visual merchandiser	6th place
Peter Grech	33	Former doctor	7th place
Jonathan "Jon" Burns	45	Beauty retail executive	8th place
Amy Wilson	43	Full-time mother	9th place
Mona Wishkahi	38	Film set designer	10th place

==== Results summary ====
Contestant	1	2	3	4	5	6	7	8
Lynsey	WIN	SAFE	WIN	BTM4	BTM3	SAFE	WIN	Winner
Siobhan	BTM4	WIN	WIN	BTM4	WIN	SAFE	SAFE	Runner-up
Micaela	SAFE	BTM4	BTM3	WIN	BTM3	SAFE	ELIM	
Paul	SAFE	WIN	LOW	WIN	HIGH	SAFE	ELIM	
Charlotte	BTM2	SAFE	WIN	BTM4	ELIM			
Barbara	BTM4	WIN	SAFE	ELIM				
Peter	SAFE	BTM4	ELIM					
Jon	WIN	BTM4	ELIM					
Amy	SAFE	ELIM						
Mona	ELIM							

The contestant won Interior Design Masters.
The contestant was the runner-up of Interior Design Masters.
The contestant received the most positive critiques of the week or making part of winning team.
The contestant received positive judges' critiques but was ultimately declared safe.
The contestant received judges' critiques but was ultimately declared safe.
The contestant received negative judges' critiques but was ultimately declared safe.
The contestant was on the bottom for that week.
The contestant was eliminated.

=== Series 3 (2022) ===
==== Contestants ====
Contestant	Age	Occupation	Outcome
Banjo Beale	35	Cheesemonger & marketer	Winner
Amy Davies	38	Print designer & illustrator	Runner up
Paul Andrews	52	Visual merchandiser	3rd place
Fran Lee	38	Fashion stylist	4th place
Dean Powell	41	Store manager	5th place
Molly Coath	23	Business administrator	6th place
Abi Davis	27	Luxecycler	7th/8th place
Rochelle Dalphinis	34	Team coordinator	7th/8th place
Peter Anderson	63	Hairdresser	9th place
Richard O'Gorman	29	Interior stylist	10th place

==== Results summary ====
Contestant	1	2	3	4	5	6	7	8
Banjo	HIGH	WIN	BTM2	WIN	WIN	WIN	BTM2	Winner
Amy	BTM4	SAFE	WIN	WIN	BTM3	BTM3	WIN	Runner-up
Paul	BTM4	SAFE	SAFE	BTM4	WIN	BTM3	ELIM	
Fran	WIN	SAFE	SAFE	BTM4	BTM3	ELIM		
Dean	SAFE	WIN	WIN	BTM4	ELIM			
Molly	BTM4	SAFE	BTM2	ELIM				
Abi	SAFE	BTM3	ELIM					
Rochelle	HIGH	BTM3	ELIM					
Peter	WIN	ELIM						
Richard	ELIM							

The contestant won Interior Design Masters.
The contestant was the runner-up of Interior Design Masters.
The contestant received the most positive critiques of the week or making part of winning team.
The contestant received positive judges' critiques but was ultimately declared safe.
The contestant received judges' critiques but was ultimately declared safe.
The contestant received negative judges' critiques but was ultimately declared safe.
The contestant was on the bottom for that week.
The contestant was eliminated.

=== Series 4 (2023) ===
==== Contestants ====
Contestant	Age	Occupation	Outcome
Monika Charchula	32	Furniture artist	Winner
Jack Kinsey	27	Interiors shop owner	Runner-up
Tom Power	47	Waiter	3rd place
Temi Johnson	37	Criminal defence lawyer	4th place
Peter Irvine	34	Visual stylist	5th place
Ry Elliott	28	Assistant interior designer	6th place
Charlotte Fisher	36	Lawyer	7th/8th place
Joanne Hardcastle	51	Foster carer	7th/8th place
Buse Gurbuz	28	Interior designer	9th place
Karl Mok	31	Architectural designer	10th place

==== Results summary ====
Contestant	1	2	3	4	5	6	7	8
Monika	SAFE	BTM4	SAFE	BTM4	BTM4	BTM4	BTM3	Winner
Jack	SAFE	HIGH	WIN	BTM4	BTM4	BTM4	BTM3	Runner-up
Tom	WIN	WIN	BTM4	WIN	BTM4	BTM4	ELIM	
Temi	BTM4	WIN	SAFE	WIN	WIN	ELIM		
Peter	BTM4	SAFE	BTM4	BTM4	ELIM			
Ry	SAFE	WIN	WIN	ELIM				
Charlotte	WIN	BTM4	ELIM					
Joanne	BTM4	BTM4	ELIM					
Buse	SAFE	ELIM						
Karl	ELIM							

The contestant won Interior Design Masters.
The contestant was the runner-up of Interior Design Masters.
The contestant received the most positive critiques of the week or making part of winning team.
The contestant received positive judges' critiques but was ultimately declared safe.
The contestant received judges' critiques but was ultimately declared safe.
The contestant received negative judges' critiques but was ultimately declared safe.
The contestant was on the bottom for that week.
The contestant was eliminated.

=== Series 5 (2024) ===
==== Contestants ====
Contestant	Age	Occupation	Outcome
Roisin Quinn	30	Former travel advisor	Winner
Matt Smith-Wood	25	Bathroom designer	Runner-up
Ben Irurzun	33	Lingerie designer	3rd Place
Anthony Ray	35	Stay-at-home dad/interior stylist	4th place
Francesca Kletz	36	Textiles maker & teacher	5th place
Domnall Starkie	46	Illustrator, artist and shop owner	6th place
Hannah Drakeford	40	Interior designer	7th/8th place
Jessica "Jess" du Preez	35	Upholsterer	7th/8th place
Ash Appleton	57	Interior therapist	9th place
Sheree Millington	36	Copywriter	10th place

==== Results summary ====
Contestant	1	2	3	4	5	6	7	8
Roisin	SAFE	SAFE	BTM4	WIN	BTM3	BTM2	WIN	Winner
Matt	HIGH	WIN	HIGH	WIN	BTM3	WIN	BTM2	Runner-up
Ben	WIN	BTM3	BTM4	SAFE	SAFE	WIN	ELIM	
Anthony	LOW	SAFE	WIN	SAFE	WIN	ELIM		
Francesca	BTM3	SAFE	SAFE	BTM2	ELIM			
Domnall	HIGH	WIN	SAFE	ELIM				
Hannah	BTM3	WIN	ELIM					
Jess	SAFE	BTM3	ELIM					
Ash	SAFE	ELIM						
Sheree	ELIM							

The contestant won Interior Design Masters.
The contestant was the runner-up of Interior Design Masters.
The contestant received the most positive critiques of the week or making part of winning team.
The contestant received positive judges' critiques but was ultimately declared safe.
The contestant received judges' critiques but was ultimately declared safe.
The contestant received negative judges' critiques but was ultimately declared safe.
The contestant was on the bottom for that week.
The contestant was eliminated.

=== Series 6 (2025) ===
==== Contestants ====
Contestant	Age	Occupation	Outcome
John Cooper	46	Design Technology Teacher	Winner
Rita Millat	42	Visual Merchandising Consultant	Runner up
Craig Masson	58	Giftware Designer	3rd place
Briony Ace	35	Homewear Retailer	4th place
Victoria Scott	31	Project Director	5th place
Bradley Dreha	25	Social Media Executive	6th place
Ayisha Onuorah	33	Design Student & Model	7th/8th place
Holly Ramsay	25	Fabric Designer	7th/8th place
Emma Carvell	53	Art & Textiles Teacher	9th place
Ese Johnson	27	Public Health Development Manager	10th place

==== Results summary ====
Contestant	1	2	3	4	5	6	7	8
John	SAFE	SAFE	BTM3	BTM3	BTM3	WIN	BTM2	Winner
Rita	WIN	SAFE	SAFE	SAFE	SAFE	BTM2	WIN	Runner-up
Craig	SAFE	SAFE	WIN	WIN	BTM3	WIN	ELIM	
Briony	SAFE	BTM3	WIN	BTM3	WIN	ELIM		
Victoria	BTM3	SAFE	SAFE	SAFE	ELIM			
Bradley	SAFE	BTM3	SAFE	ELIM				
Ayisha	SAFE	SAFE	ELIM					
Holly	SAFE	WIN	ELIM					
Emma	BTM3	ELIM						
Ese	ELIM							

The contestant won Interior Design Masters.
The contestant was the runner-up of Interior Design Masters.
The contestant received the most positive critiques of the week or making part of winning team.
The contestant received positive judges' critiques but was ultimately declared safe.
The contestant received judges' critiques but was ultimately declared safe.
The contestant received negative judges' critiques but was ultimately declared safe.
The contestant was on the bottom for that week.
The contestant was eliminated.

=== Series 7 (2026) ===
==== Contestants ====
Contestant	Age	Occupation	Outcome
Lia Gold	34	Retail Inventory Control & Home Stager	Winner
Sophie Newlands	36	Specialist Painter	Runner up
Emmely Elgersma	35	Artist & Football Coach	3rd
Duran Abdullah		Dancer & Choreographer	4th
Ajeet Jugnauth	38	Creative Industries Consultant	5th
Jonni Knight	31	Stage School Manager	6th
Ben Smith	28	Outdoor Furniture Designer	7th/8th
Kate Hewitt	42	Content Creator	7th/8th
Frankie Ratford	42	Graphic Designer	9th
Teo Villacci	29	Graphic Designer	10th

==== Results summary ====
Contestant	1	2	3	4	5	6	7	8
Lia	SAFE	SAFE	BTM4	WIN	BTM4	WIN	BTM3	Winner
Sophie	SAFE	WIN	SAFE	BTM3	BTM4	WIN	BTM2	Runner-up
Emmely	BTM3	BTM3	WIN	SAFE	WIN	BTM2	ELIM	
Duran	SAFE	BTM3	SAFE	BTM3	BTM4	ELIM		
Ajeet	SAFE	SAFE	WIN	SAFE	ELIM			
Jonni	SAFE	SAFE	BTM4	ELIM				
Ben	WIN	SAFE	ELIM					
Kate	BTM3	SAFE	ELIM					
Frankie	SAFE	ELIM						
Teo	ELIM							

The contestant won Interior Design Masters.
The contestant was the runner-up of Interior Design Masters.
The contestant received the most positive critiques of the week or making part of winning team.
The contestant received positive judges' critiques but was ultimately declared safe.
The contestant received judges' critiques but was ultimately declared safe.
The contestant received negative judges' critiques but was ultimately declared safe.
The contestant was on the bottom for that week.
The contestant was eliminated.
