= Ella Mills =

British food writer and entrepreneur (born 1991)

- Born: Eleanor Laura Davan Woodward; 31 May 1991 (age 35); Rugby, Warwickshire, England
- Education: Rugby School; University of St Andrews
- Occupations: Food writer and businnesswoman
- Known for: Deliciously Ella brand
- Spouse: Matthew Mills (m. 2016)
- Children: 2
- Parent(s): Shaun Woodward; Camilla Sainsbury
- Relatives: Tim Sainsbury (grandfather)
- Website: deliciouslyella.com

Eleanor Laura Davan Mills (née Woodward; born 31 May 1991) is a British food writer and businesswoman, best known for the plant-based Deliciously Ella food blog and brand. On her mother's side, she is part of the Sainsbury family.

== Early life and family ==
Woodward was born on 31 May 1991 in Rugby, Warwickshire, England, the daughter of the politician Shaun Woodward and his wife Camilla, daughter of politician Tim Sainsbury and granddaughter of Lord Sainsbury, of the Sainsbury's supermarket owning family. After attending Rugby School and Hurtwood House, Woodward graduated with a degree in history of art from the University of St Andrews in 2013. In April 2016, she married Tessa Jowell's son, Matthew Mills, who is also her business partner. The couple have two daughters.

== Career ==
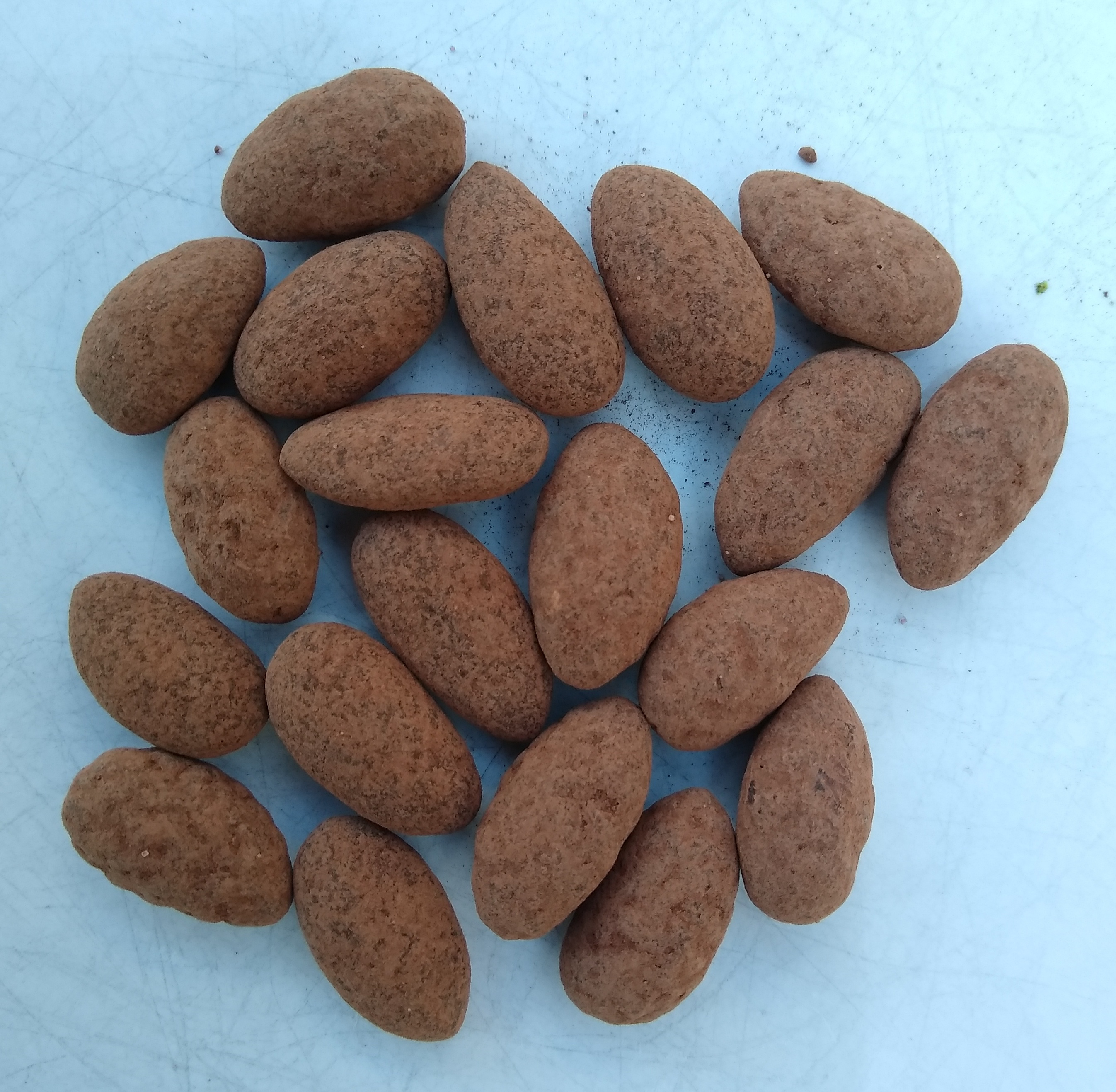
Deliciously Ella brand chocolate-covered almonds

Woodward writes about food in a blog she set up in 2012 named Deliciously Ella, also the title of her first book, published in 2015. Her second book, Deliciously Ella Every Day, was released in January 2016. A third book, Deliciously Ella With Friends, was released in January 2017. She was an advocate of clean eating but turned against it after a media backlash that questioned its health benefits. Her clean eating series of books was called by The Guardian "arguably the most successful fad diet cookbook series in recent years".

In 2014, the Deliciously Ella App was launched containing more than 100 recipes. The app with plant-based recipes, yoga videos and guided meditations is available in the App Store and Google Play. In 2015, she and her business partner, Matthew Mills, opened The MaE Deli, Seymour Place, Marylebone. In 2016 they opened their second site, The MaE Deli, Weighhouse Street, Mayfair. In early 2017, a third site was launched named The Kitchen Counter, in Herne Hill, as an extension to their development kitchen. In March 2018, after less than a year, the Herne Hill site was closed down, as was the Marylebone deli, due to debts accruing of £720,000. The Deliciously Ella brand also includes food products sold in stores. These products started with energy balls and eventually expanded to more than 30 products. They expanded to the United States in 2019.

== Books ==
VegNews listed Deliciously Ella: Quick & Easy as one of the "Top 100 Vegan Cookbooks of All Time" in 2024.

- —— (2015). Deliciously Ella: Awesome ingredients, incredible food that you and your body will love. London: Hodder and Stoughton. ISBN 9781444795004.
- —— (2016). Deliciously Ella Every Day. London: Hodder and Stoughton. ISBN 9781473619487.
- —— (September 2016). Deliciously Ella: Smoothies & Juices: Bite-size Collection. ISBN 1473647282.
- —— (2017). Deliciously Ella With Friends. London: Hodder and Stoughton. ISBN 9781473619517.
- —— (August 2018). Deliciously Ella: The Plant-Based Cookbook. ISBN 9781473639218.
- —— (July 2020). Deliciously Ella: Quick & Easy Cookbook. ISBN 9781473639249.
