= Alex de Rijke =

British architect (born 1960)

- Born: Alexander de Rijke; 1960 (age 65–66)
- Occupation: Architect
- Notable work: Hastings Pier, Maggie's Oldham, Endless Stair, MK40, Sliding House, Kingsdale School and Naked House.

Alex de Rijke (born 1960 of Dutch parents) is a British architect, timber architecture advocate, educationalist and architectural photographer. De Rijke founded the architecture practice, dRMM, in 1995 with Philip Marsh and Sadie Morgan. In 2022 dRMM Studio was formed to acknowledge co-directors Jonas Lencer, Saskia Lencer, Judith Stichtenoth and a Berlin office. De Rijke's research into, and application of, contemporary materials, technologies and methods of construction have helped make dRMM a globally recognised pioneer and authority in engineered timber design.

== Background ==
De Rijke's alma mater is the Royal College of Art, London. As an advocate of learning through experiment and making, and has taught at several architecture education institutions, including the Architectural Association School of Architecture in London, Kingston University, Plymouth University, Oxford Brookes University, Avani School of Architecture, India, and the Peter Behrens School of Arts/University of Applied Sciences Düsseldorf. He was Dean of Architecture at the Royal College of Art from 2011 to 2015, and simultaneously Professor of the Masters Programme in 2013–15. He guest lectures around the world and has been external examiner to the Architectural Association Design & Make (Hooke Park) timber M.Arch and MSc. programmes, as well as the Spatial Practice Masters programme at Central St. Martin's, University of the Arts London. In November 2023, de Rijke was made the first Professor of Timber Architecture at TU Delft, the Netherlands, where he is helping lead the university's transition to working with bio-based materials.

In 2006 de Rijke and dRMM designed and built 'Naked House', a research prototype, flat-packed cross-laminated timber (CLT) house for global adoption. This was installed at the exhibition 'Industry!' in Oslo with an accompanying manifesto declaring, 'Timber is the New Concrete'. De Rijke and dRMM then built the first UK school buildings constructed in CLT, the Kingsdale School Music and Sport buildings 2007. In 2009 de Rijke led a dRMM competition project for a 100m span timber stadium for the London 2012 Olympics. In 2013 de Rijke devised cross-laminated hardwood (Tulipwood CLT) with AHEC (American Hardwood Export Council) and ARUP for dRMM's London Design Festival project, ‘Endless Stair’. The development of cross-laminated tulipwood was then demonstrated in dRMM's design of Maggie's Oldham 2017, the first CLT hardwood building in the world. dRMM received the UK's top architecture honour in 2017, the RIBA Stirling Prize, for the design of Hastings Pier, for which de Rijke was the project architect.

In 2026 he founded a timber architecture design consultancy based in the Netherlands - Alex de Rijke Wood.
