= MuscleMag International =

Canadian fitness magazine

- Categories: Bodybuilding magazine
- Frequency: Monthly
- Founder: Robert Kennedy
- Founded: 1974
- Final issue: 7 June 2013
- Company: Active Interest Media
- Country: Canada
- Language: English
- ISSN: 1086-3400

MuscleMag International or Musclemag was a Canadian bodybuilding, fitness and men's magazine, considered one of the top magazines in its field. It was established in Canada in 1974 by Robert Kennedy, an immigrant to Canada and leading expert in fitness and bodybuilding, with an initial print run of 110,000. It divided its magazine and website into Muscle Building, Nutrition and Supplements, Strength Training, Culture and Girls, regularly featuring fitness and glamour models and sex tips.

Kennedy died in 2012, and his company filed for bankruptcy the next year. MuscleMag was acquired by Active Interest Media. It ended publication on 7 June 2013.
