= Ewen Cameron (presenter) =

Scottish radio and television presenter

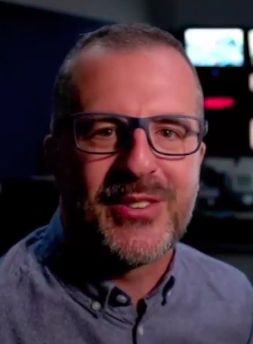
- Cameron at the launch of STV2 in 2017
- Born: 23 May 1972 (age 54); Glasgow, Scotland
- Occupations: Comedian, television presenter, radio DJ
- Years active: 2009–present
- Spouse: Teresa Cameron (1995–)

Ewen Cameron (born 23 May 1972) is a Scottish radio DJ and television presenter. Since January 2026, he presents STV Radio show Ewen & Cat at Breakfast, as well The STV Radio Football Show programme and podcast alongside Ronnie Charters.

He hosted the late-night television programme The Late Show with Ewen Cameron on STV2 from 2016 to 2018. He was also host of STV2 lifestyle show Live at Five, from 2016 until 2018, as well as hosting a variety of STV television specials, including, The Festival Show and Scotland's Big Sleep Out.

== Early life ==
Cameron grew up in Wester Hailes, Edinburgh and attended Tynecastle High School. He has two brothers; their parents split when they were young. Cameron has suffered from panic attacks since he was 13.

== Career ==
=== Early career ===
Cameron began his career working as a sports journalist in Dubai, United Arab Emirates. After filling in for his friend DJing in a nightclub there, he decided to quit journalism and do nightclub DJing full time.

=== Radio career ===
Having worked as a nightclub DJ in Dubai for a while, Cameron was offered a job at Abu Dhabi's radio station, Emirates Radio. Six months after joining, he was presenting the breakfast show and later switched to the drivetime slot before ultimately becoming station manager. On 11 September 2001, having mentioned in a UK newspaper feature that he would like to come back to live in Scotland, Cameron had an interview for Real Radio in Glasgow, which he joined later that month as the station's sports editor. In 2002, he and Alan Rough became co-hosts of The Real Radio Football Phone In, which they presented together for eight years; the show was also broadcast on television on Setanta Sports. In December 2010, Cameron was announced as the new host of the Real Radio breakfast show, taking over from former Scot FM DJ Robin Galloway. "This is a fantastic opportunity to host the Breakfast Show on Scotland's No.1 commercial radio station and one that I'm honoured to take," Cameron said. "I have thoroughly enjoyed my time on the Football Phone In, but now I will get the chance to actually go and watch the football, instead of just talk about it!"

January 2011 marked the beginning of a long working relationship between Cameron and Cat Harvey. They continued in the breakfast slot when the station rebranded as Heart FM Breakfast in May 2014. Cameron left the station to pursue other opportunities and was replaced by Robin Galloway when the normal weekday scheduled resumed on 5 January 2015, after the weekday schedule changed during the Christmas season.

On 9 August 2015, Cameron and Harvey became hosts of the Sunday mid-morning show between 9.00am - 12.00pm on the Hits Radio Scotland Network as part of the Bauer Media Group, including Clyde 1, Forth 1, MFR, Northsound 1, Tay FM and West FM. Cameron began presenting solo at breakfast Monday to Friday from 10 September 2018, the show was now called Ewen Cameron in the Morning broadcasting live from the Radio Clyde studios in Glasgow between 6.00am - 10.00am on Clyde 2, Forth 2, MFR 2, Northsound 2, Tay 2 and West Sound, with West Sound Dumfries & Galloway picking up the show from July 2019 onwards In December 2020, it was announced Harvey would reunite with Cameron for Ewen & Cat at Breakfast on Greatest Hits Radio Scotland weekdays. Their show is broadcast live from the Radio Clyde studios in Glasgow from 06:00 to 10:00am. In October 2021, the duo stepped down from the Sunday mid-morning slot, with Greig "Greigsy" Easton taking over.

Cameron could also be heard on The Big Scottish Football Show (previously The Big Saturday Football Show), which is broadcast on Forth 1 every Saturday afternoon, alongside Steven Mill. Launched on 17 October 2020 to rival Superscoreboard on Clyde 1, the show features a mix of music, sport and entertainment. In July 2022, Cameron and Mill began hosting The Big Scottish Football Podcast.

On 26 June 2025, it was announced that Ewen and Cat would be leaving Greatest Hits Radio Scotland at the end of July; The following day, it was announced they will present the breakfast show on a new station to be launched by STV Group later in the year. They launched STV Radio on 7 January 2026.

=== Television career ===
Cameron began his television career with STV when he guest presented The Hour with long-serving host Michelle McManus in July 2011, then in 2015 Cameron began co-presenting The Fountainbridge Show on STV Edinburgh until he stepped down from the role in January 2016 in order to begin co-presenting Live at Five on STV Glasgow then renamed to the STV2 channel in April 2017, The same year in 2016, Cameron was commissioned for his own late-night talk show on the STV2 channel, The show, The Late Show with Ewen Cameron also began broadcasting in January 2016, originally on the STV Glasgow and STV Edinburgh networks, until both channels closed in 2017 and merged to form the new STV2 channel, where the programme aired at 10:30 pm.

In late 2017, Cameron appeared in an episode as himself in the online-comedy series The Glasgow Trip (where he starred alongside Des McLean and Gary Little) then presented a couple of STV festive specials over Christmas time, Scotland's Big Sleep Out then a blooper show called Festive Failures, all of which were aired in December respectively.

Cameron's Live at Five and The Late Show with Ewen Cameron ended in June 2018 with the closure of the STV2 television channel. Cameron's final contribution to STV was a short series of Edinburgh festival specials in August 2018, after which he returned to the radio airwaves full-time.

== Personal life ==
Cameron has been married to his Irish wife, Teresa, since 7 May 1995. They renewed their vows on 14 May 2012. The couple live in Maddiston, Falkirk and have three sons: Liam, Ryan and Josh.

Cameron is a Heart of Midlothian F.C. fan and has been a season ticket holder at Tynecastle Park "on and off" for several years.

== Filmography ==
=== Television ===
- The Hour (2011): Guest co-presenter
- The Fountainbridge Show (2015–2016): Co-presenter
- Live at Five (2016–2018): Co-presenter
- The Late Show with Ewen Cameron (2016–2018): Host
- The Glasgow Trip (2017): Self
- Scotland's Big Sleep Out (2017): Host
- The Festival Show (2018): Co-presenter

=== Radio ===
- Ewen & Cat @ Breakfast (Real Radio Scotland/Heart Scotland, 2010–2014)
- Ewen & Cat (Hits Radio Scotland, 2015–2021)
- Ewen Cameron in the Morning (Greatest Hits Radio Scotland, 2018–2020)
- The Big Saturday Football Show (Hits Radio Network Scotland, 2020–2025)
- Ewen & Cat @ Breakfast (Greatest Hits Radio Scotland, 2021–2025)
- Ewen & Cat at Breakfast (STV Radio, 2026–present)

=== Podcast ===
- The Big Scottish Football Podcast with Steven Mill and Ewen Cameron (2022–2025)
- The STV Radio Football Show with Ewen Cameron and Ronnie Charters (2025–present)
