= Media Village Scotland =

Coordinates: 55.858025°N 4.290924°W

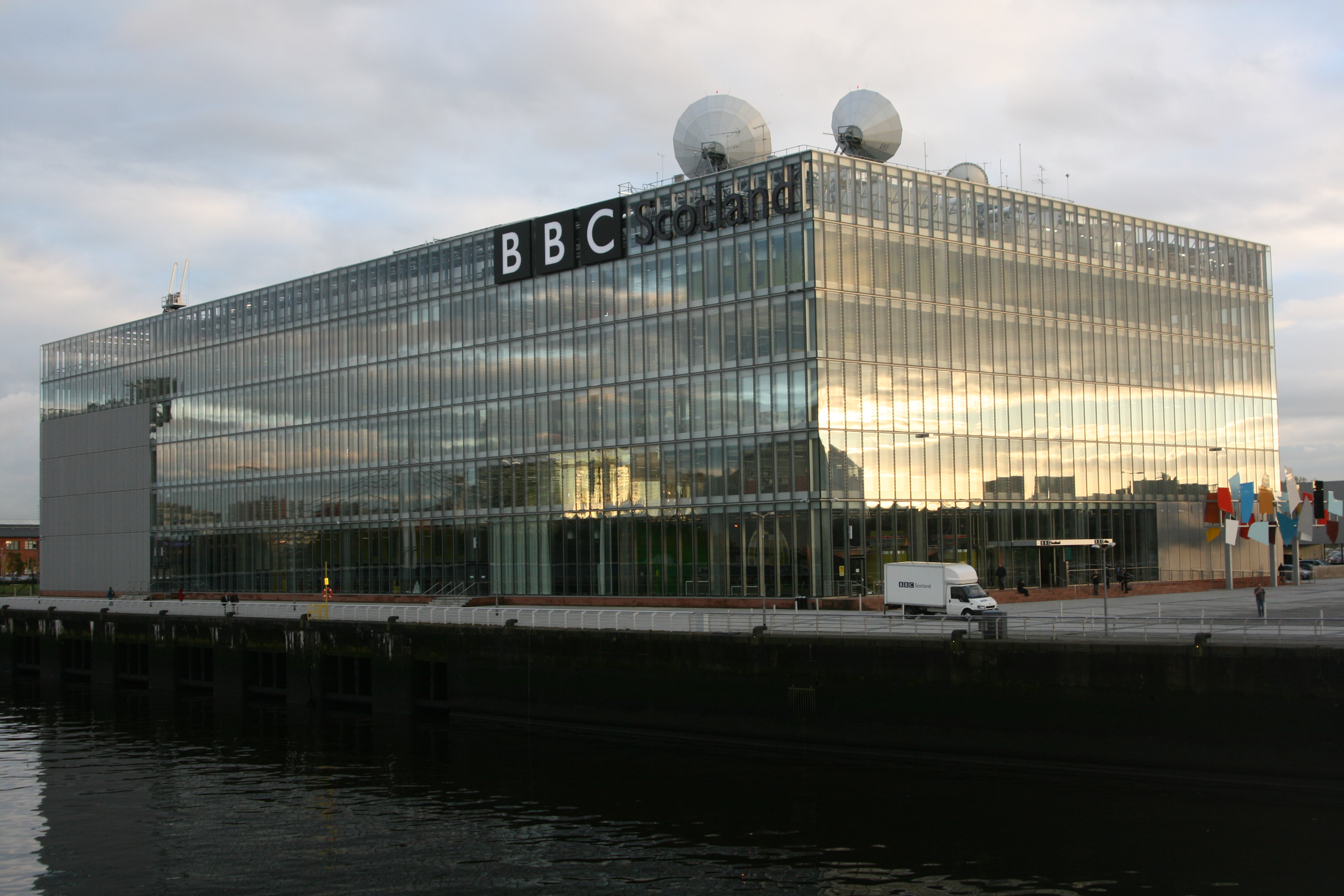
BBC Scotland Studios and HQ in the area.

Media Village Scotland is a television studio complex at Pacific Quay, Glasgow, Scotland. It is home to BBC Scotland & STV. It is situated near the Scottish Exhibition and Conference Centre and the Glasgow Science Centre.

== BBC ==
The studios are home to BBC Scotland and BBC Radio Scotland. It is one of the largest television studios outside London, and one of the most digitally advanced complexes in Europe. It was opened by then-Prime Minister Gordon Brown in the summer of 2007. It is promised to be one of the centres for future broadcasting in United Kingdom.

=== BBC Studio Programming ===
The studio is home to many Scottish and British programmes such as:

Jet Set 24, Postcode Challenge, Reporting Scotland, Newsnight Scotland, Sportscene, Children in Need & BBC Scotland's Hogmanay

== STV ==
=== STV Programming ===
The Scottish ITV network STV produced the following Scottish programmes in their brand new complex opened in summer 2006:

Scotland Today, The Five Thirty Show, Politics Now & Scotsport. Compared to the BBC Scotland television studio it is much smaller, this is why STV's Postcode Challenge is recorded at the BBC Scotland HQ.
