= STV Hogmanay specials =

Scottish television programme

- Bringing in the Bells titles
- Also known as: Bringing in the Bells (2021–present)
- Genre: New Year's television special
- Starring: Various
- Country of origin: Scotland
- Original language: English
- No. of episodes: 20

Production
- Camera setup: Multi-camera
- Running time: 20-60 minutes
- Production company: STV News

Original release
- Network: STV
- Release: 31 December 2006 – present

STV Hogmanay specials are broadcast on commercial channel STV, and are annual event programmes broadcast on Hogmanay, Scotland's New Year's Eve celebration. The specials have been pre-recorded since 2009, having previously been aired live.

Before the merger of Scottish TV and Grampian TV in 2006 to become "STV", the Scottish broadcasters shared Hogmanay programming since their parent company, SMG was formed in 1997.

== Broadcasts ==
The programme is broadcast in STV's licensed areas of Central Scotland and the North of Scotland. The rest of the ITV network (known as ITV1) usually broadcasts a special ITV News programme leading into the New Year.

Year	Programme	Presenter(s)/Narrator	Guest(s)	Location
2006	Hogmanay Stories	Colin McAllister, Justin Ryan	Michelle McManus, John Carmichael	
2007	Hogmanay Live from Edinburgh	Grant Stott, Michelle Watt		Edinburgh
2008	The Live Hogmanay Show	Vicky Lee, Gerry McCulloch	Laura Marks	STV Studios, Glasgow
2009	Scotland's Always Had Talent	Michelle McManus		
2010	The Midnight Hour	Stephen Jardine, Michelle McManus		STV Studios, Glasgow
2011	Scotland's Greatest Album: The Countdown	Clare Grogan		
2012	Bring in the New Year			
2013	Swing Into 2014	Michelle McManus	Stephen Purdon, Gary Lamont, Des McLean	Tron Theatre, Glasgow
2014	What a Year!	John MacKay, Jennifer Reoch		Stirling Castle
2015	Burdz Eye View of Hogmanay	Elaine C. Smith	Nicola Sturgeon, Janey Godley	
2016	Lorraine Kelly's Hogmanay	Lorraine Kelly	Seán Dillon, Jenni Falconer, Eileen McCallum, Stevie McCrorie, Judy Murray, Ricky Ross	HM Frigate Unicorn, Dundee
2017	Thingummyjig Hogmanay Ceilidh	Jack McLaughlin, David Farrell, Jennifer Reoch	Seán Batty, Kris Commons, Lisa Hague, Eileen McCallum, Archie Macpherson, Glen Michael, Jesse Rae	St Andrew's in the Square, Glasgow
2018	Lulu's Hogmanay Hooley	Lulu	KT Tunstall	Glasgow
2019	Sean's Very Scottish Hogmanay	Seán Batty, Jennifer Reoch	Mairi Campbell, Dougie Maclean	Craufurdland Castle, Kilmarnock
2020	The Daily Record Pride of Scotland Awards 2020	Elaine C. Smith, Kirsty Gallacher	McFly, Red Hot Chilli Pipers, Tom Walker	University of Glasgow
2021	Bringing in the Bells	Lorraine Kelly	Amy Macdonald, Richard Foster, Gail Porter, Fred MacAulay, Sanjeev Kohli, Jane McCarry, Jean Johansson, Grado, Seán Batty, Laura Boyd	
2022	Bringing in the Bells	Lorraine Kelly	Jean Johansson, Grado, Liz McColgan, Eilish McColgan, Judy Murray, Chris Forbes, Sanjeev Kohli, Jane McCarry, Seán Batty, Laura Boyd	
2023	Bringing in the Bells	Lorraine Kelly	Alex Norton, Blythe Duff, Martin Compston, Gordon Smart, Jean Johansson, Grado, Seán Batty, Laura Boyd, The Laurettes	Dundas Castle, Kennox House, Mar Hall
2024	Bringing in the Bells	Lorraine Kelly	Jean Johansson, Grado, Susie McCabe, Gordon Smart, Seán Batty, Laura Boyd, The Eves	Kennox House
2025	Bringing in the Bells	Sanjeev Kohli	Jean Johansson, Grado, Susie McCabe, Gordon Smart, Seán Batty, Laura Boyd, RuMac	
