= Angus Purden =

Scottish television presenter

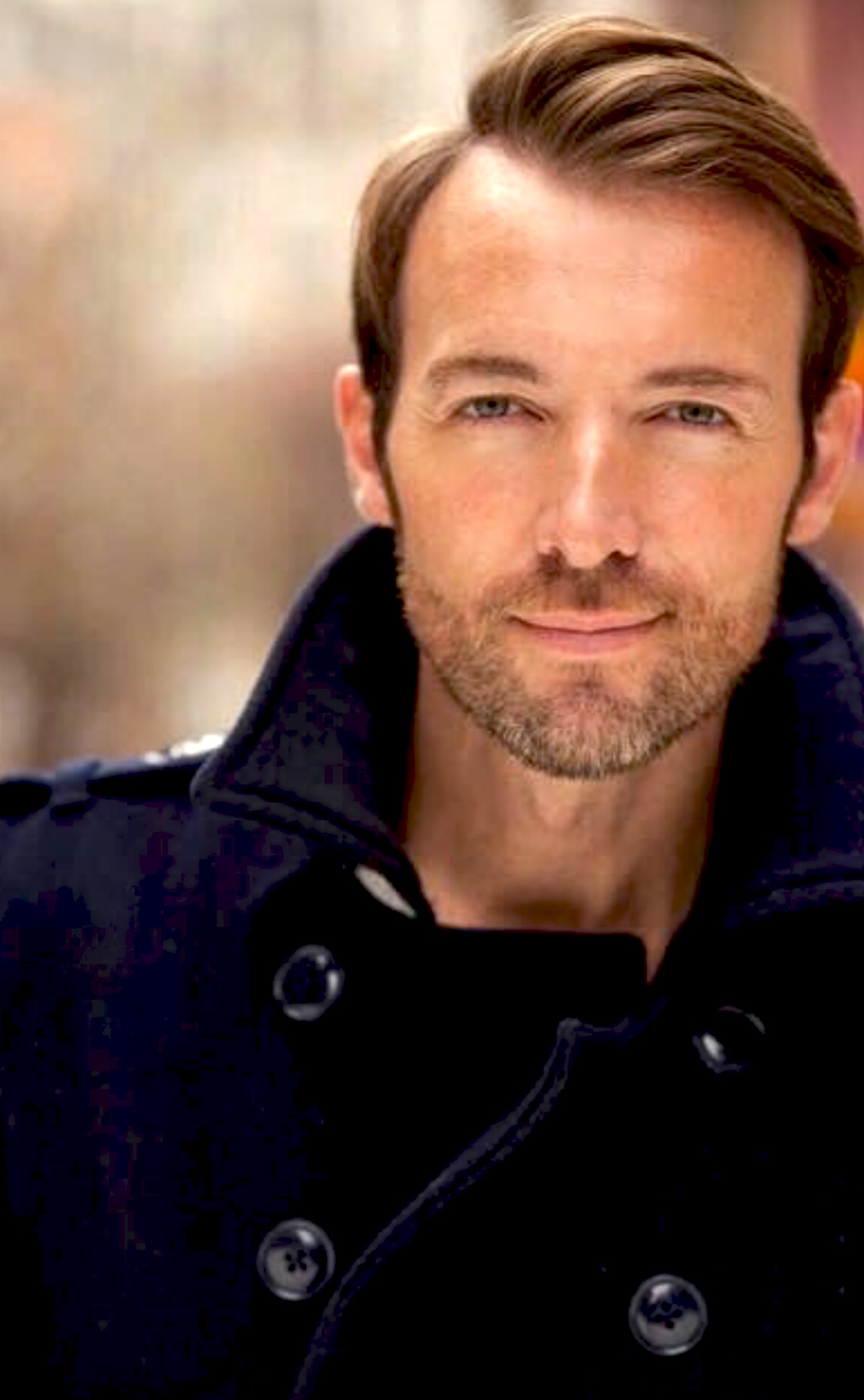
- Born: Lanarkshire, Scotland
- Occupation: Television presenter/Teacher of Psychology
- Height: About 6 ft (1.8 m)

Angus Purden (born 1973) is a Scottish television presenter. A former Mr. Scotland and model, he wrote for a Scottish newspaper and is now best known for presenting do-it-yourself and Scottish lottery shows. One of the regular presenters for the BBC series Cash in the Attic since 2002, he also appeared in programmes such as Channel 4's Room For Improvement (2004-2010) and Ghost Towns (2005–2006) for Living TV, and he was a street prize presenter and public face of People's Postcode Lottery. In April 2010, Angus became the main host of STV gameshow Postcode Challenge.

== Early life ==
The youngest in his family with two sisters and a brother. Purden was born in 1973 and named Gary. He was raised in the small town of Shotts in Lanarkshire. As a teenager, he won the title of Mr. Scotland in a Daily Record competition in 1992. The win opened the door to working as a catwalk model in Paris and Milan, including a three-year modelling stint for Giorgio Armani in Milan. According to Purden, "I was surrounded by beautiful people so I remember laughing my head off that they thought I looked exotic. I was just a wee boy from a housing estate in Lanarkshire but I had thick, long curly hair and they liked me. The designer Romeo Gigli used me as his muse, and designed an entire collection on me. It was an amazing time."

== Career ==
Purden wrote a column for the Glasgow Evening Times before his break on television appearing on STV as a prize presenter for the quiz show Wheel of Fortune presented by John Leslie. Subsequently, he was a reporter for GMTV and Five News.

Purden was a presenter on BBC's Cash in the Attic, visiting family homes to find out what they need to raise money for. They then explore the home to find items that may be taken to auction, which are valued by experts. Before this, he presented Series 1 to 3 of Channel 4's Room For Improvement, a home renovation show.

Purden appeared with TV personality and self-described psychic medium Derek Acorah. In 2005 he presented Quest for Guy Fawkes, which attempted to discover what happened during the Gunpowder Plot of 1605 by contacting Guy Fawkes's spirit. In the first season of Derek Acorah's Ghost Towns (2005–2006), Purden and co-presenter Danniella Westbrook accompanied Acorah to towns and cities throughout Great Britain said to be haunted. These programmes were produced for Living TV.

Purden did media work for British Airways TV, RBS, Scottish Television (now STV) and the Travel Channel, and also fronted TV We Love To Hate for BBC Three. Radio appearances include BBC Radio Scotland and LBC 97.3, and he writes occasional travel pieces for the Scottish tabloid the Sunday Mail.

In 2010, Purden appeared in a cinema advertising campaign against the arms trade for Amnesty International.

Purden, alongside Lorraine Kelly presented the six-part psychology series, Make Me Happier for STV, which was broadcast in November/December 2009, then appeared as a guest presenter on STV's daily lifestyle show The Hour on occasion – his first show being in February 2010, alongside main anchor Michelle McManus. In April 2010, he presented STV gameshow Postcode Challenge, replacing Carol Smillie until the show was cancelled. Purden read psychology via the Open University and in Edinburgh where he gained an honours degree. He subsequently retrained, worked at Hinchley Wood School for 2 years and is now head of psychology at an all boys private school in London.

== Selected work ==
Year(s) of appearance	TV programme or series
2002–present	Cash in the Attic
2004 (Series 1–3)	Room for Improvement
2005	2005 BAFTA/LA Cunard Britannia Awards
2005	Derek Acorah's Quest for Guy Fawkes
2005–2006 (22 episodes)	Derek Acorah's Ghost Towns
2007–present	People's Postcode Lottery
February 2008	Ready Steady Cook (participant)
[Currently unknown]	TV We Love to Hate
2006	Watch to Win
November/December 2009	Make Me Happier
February 2010	The Hour (guest host)
April 2010 – 2011	Postcode Challenge (main host)

Some information in this table was obtained from Angus Purden: Filmography, Internet Movie Database (IMDb).

== Personal life ==
Purden is interested in interiors and architecture. In January 2004 it was reported that he and his partner owned a 1722 five-storey Georgian townhouse in the East End of London which had taken seven years to renovate and furnish from its original near-derelict state. He later moved to Notting Hill.

By April 2006 Purden had returned to Glasgow's West End after having spent 12 years in London. He said that being back in Scotland was a "breath of fresh air" and added: "Life seemed too hard in London. I needed to be there initially because of my career but now that I'm more established I feel it's going to be easier to commute. I'm elated to be back." In Glasgow, he acquired and renovated two B-listed properties. He later renovated a property in Edinburgh.

Purden lists his other main interests as including food, travel (he speaks fluent Italian) and consumer issues. However, in February 2008 he was branded a 'kitchen calamity' after recording the lowest-ever score on the BBC programme Ready Steady Cook.
