= Kaye Adams =

Scottish television presenter and journalist (born 1962)

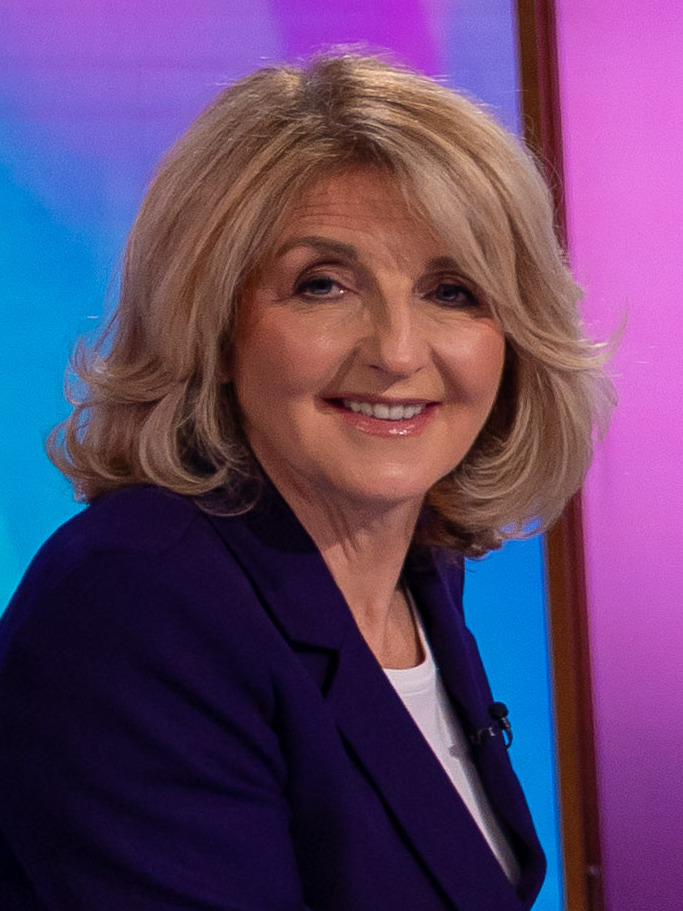
- Adams in 2024
- Born: 28 December 1962 (age 63); Falkirk, Stirlingshire, Scotland
- Education: University of Edinburgh
- Occupations: Presenter, radio presenter
- Years active: 1980s–present
- Employer: ITV
- Television: Loose Women
- Partner: Ian Campbell (cp. 2025)
- Children: 2

Kaye Rintoul Adams (born 28 December 1962) is a Scottish television presenter and journalist. From 2010 to 2025, she presented a morning show on BBC Radio Scotland. She was an anchor on ITV topical discussion show Loose Women from 1999 to 2006 and again from 2013. Adams was also a regular panellist on Channel 5's daily morning show The Wright Stuff from 2007 until 2012.

== Early life ==
Adams was born in Falkirk and brought up in Grangemouth, where she attended Abbotsgrange Middle school and Grangemouth High, before moving to the fee-paying St George's School, Edinburgh and the University of Edinburgh, from which she graduated with an MA Honours in Economics and Politics.

== Media career ==
Adams started her media career as a graduate trainee at Central Television, concentrating on political and news journalism: her first coup was a one-hour interview with Margaret Thatcher. For the next few years, Adams remained focused on hard news when, in early 1988, moved to Scottish Television's nightly news programme, Scotland Today. She was one of the first journalists on the scene of the Lockerbie disaster in 1988. In 1992, a chance opportunity to host a discussion show for Scottish Television, after its original anchor Sheena McDonald left, set her off on a different path. Scottish Women ran for six years under Adams' chair (1993–99), won a number of awards and marked the start of Adams' career as a talk show host.

Since her original success with Scottish Women, Adams has presented ITV Weekend Live, three series of Central Weekend Live with Nicky Campbell and John Stapleton; Esther, latterly Kaye for BBC Two; and Pride and Prejudice for BBC Scotland. Adams co-presented the last ever This Morning before Richard and Judy left, while, in 2002, she was This Morning's daily live anchor from Australia, reporting on the first series of I'm a Celebrity, Get Me Out of Here!. She has also appeared on Lily Savage's Blankety Blank.

Between 1999 and 2006, Adams anchored the ITV talk show Loose Women where, combined with the rest of the female panel, she created a popular and engaging mix of topical issues and entertainment. On 5 November 2013, Adams returned to the panel, in rotation with Carol Vorderman and Andrea McLean. In January 2014, former Loose Woman Ruth Langsford returned to co-anchor the programme with Adams, Vorderman and McLean in rotation. Vorderman left the show in July 2014.

Adams has also presented a daytime show called The People Versus, as well as appearing as a panellist, and latterly as host of Have I Got News for You.

Between 2007 and 2010, Adams regularly guest hosted and was a panellist on the Channel 5 panel show The Wright Stuff.

In late 2008, Adams narrated a six-part documentary series, The Merchant Navy, on STV.

On 26 May 2009, Adams returned to STV, more than 20 years after her first appearance on the station, as a guest co-host on the lifestyle programme The Hour with Stephen Jardine. Adams presented four shows. In August of that year, Adams joined a long team of reporters on The One Show.

Having reported on the Lockerbie bombing in 1988 for STV, Adams narrated a special documentary, The Lockerbie Bomber: Sent Home to Die for the Scottish television channel, which aired on 9 August 2010. The programme examined the Lockerbie bomber's conviction and the renewed controversy over the Scottish Government's decision to send him home to Libya on compassionate grounds a year earlier.

Since 2011, she has guest presented Channel 5's LIVE with... programme.

In 2013, Adams co-hosted the ITV daytime chat show Sunday Scoop with Nadia Sawalha.

Both Sawalha and Adams are represented by Nicola Ibison of Ibison Talent Group, who acts as both their agent and management. Adams and Sawalha released a cookery book in 2018 called Nadia & Kaye: Disaster Chef.

From March 2010, Adams was a presenter on BBC Radio Scotland. She was the host of daily phone-in programme, Call Kaye. The show was replaced in 2015 by The Kaye Adams Show and aired weekdays from 9am to midday. The programme was later renamed to Mornings with Kaye Adams, with the Thursday and Friday edition of the show hosted by broadcast journalist Stephen Jardine.

In 2022, Adams was a contestant on the twentieth series of BBC's Strictly Come Dancing. She was paired with Kai Widdrington, and was first to be eliminated.

Adams was suspended from her BBC radio show in October 2025 after a junior member of staff complained of bullying. In February 2026, it was announced that she would not be returning after complaints from three colleagues were upheld in an internal investigation.

== Personal life ==
Adams and her long-term partner, tennis coach Ian Campbell, have two daughters. In 2025, they entered a civil partnership, which Adams later revealed was done for tax reasons. She is a close friend of fellow Loose Women panellist Nadia Sawalha.

Adams is a co-patron of Kindred, a Scottish-based charity supporting families of young people with disabilities and mental health issues.

In 2022, Adams admitted she had been lying to her daughter about her own age for around 20 years, knocking a decade off her real age.

== Filmography ==
Year	Title	Channel	Role
1999–2000, 2002–2006, 2013–	Loose Women	ITV	Regular presenter Regular panellist & Relief presenter (2016–2018); Relief panellist (2014–2015, 2019–2022)
2000–2001	Live Talk	ITV	Regular presenter
2000–2001	This Morning	ITV	Guest presenter (Filling in for Fern Britton)
2001–2002	The People Versus	ITV	Presenter
2004	Have I Got News for You	BBC One	Guest presenter
2007–2012	The Wright Stuff	Channel 5	Regular panellist
2008	Celebrity MasterChef	BBC One	Contestant
2008	The Merchant Navy	STV	Narrator
2009	The Hour	STV	Guest presenter
2010	The Big Questions	BBC One	Guest presenter
2011	Live with...	Channel 5	Guest presenter
2013	The Wright Stuff	Channel 5	Guest presenter
2013	Sunday Scoop	ITV	Co-presenter
2017	Good Morning Britain: Election 2017	ITV	Glasgow reporter, live from Glasgow Science Centre
2021	The Celebrity Circle		8th Place; Paired with Nadia Sawalha
2022	Strictly Come Dancing	BBC One	Contestant; series 20
2024	The Weakest Link	BBC One	Winner; series 3, episode 13

== See also ==
- List of Strictly Come Dancing contestants
