= Sunday Morning Live =

Sunday Morning Live may refer to:

- Sunday Morning Live (British TV programme), a British religious discussion programme that airs on BBC One
- CNN Sunday Morning, an American news program, sometimes referred to as Sunday Morning Live, that airs on CNN

== See also ==
- Sunday Live, a Scottish current affairs programme
- Sunday Live with Adam Boulton, a Sky News discussion programme
