= The Late Show with Ewen Cameron =

2016–2018 Scottish TV series

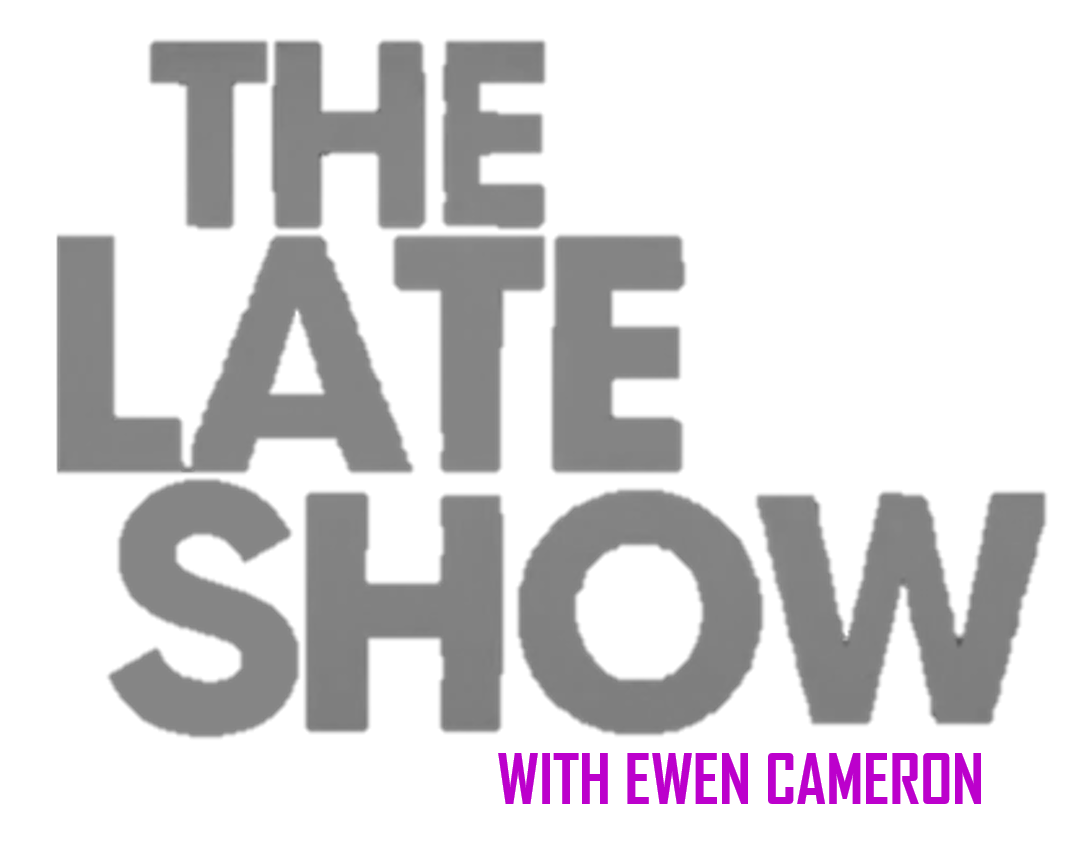
- Also known as: The Late Show
- Created by: Ewen Cameron
- Written by: Moray Borthwick
- Presented by: Ewen Cameron; Hayley Matthews (2016)
- Country of origin: Scotland
- No. of seasons: 3

Production
- Production locations: Fountainbridge Studios, Edinburgh (first inception); Pacific Quay, Glasgow (second inception)
- Running time: 30 minutes (without advertisements)
- Production company: STV

Original release
- Network: STV2; STV Glasgow (2016–2017); STV Edinburgh (2016–2017)
- Release: 6 January 2016 – 28 June 2018

Related
- The Riverside Show; The Fountainbridge Show; Live at Five

The Late Show with Ewen Cameron, (also known as The Late Show) is a late-night talk show television programme that originally was broadcast in Scotland on the STV2 network channel presented by comedian and television personality Ewen Cameron. The show began broadcasting in January 2016, originally on the STV Glasgow and STV Edinburgh networks, until both channels were axed in 2017 and merged to form the new STV2 channel, where the programme aired at 10:30 pm.

On 16 May 2018, it was announced that STV2 would close and all of its original programming including The Late Show with Ewen Cameron would be axed in June 2018. The final episode aired on 28 June 2018 ahead of the STV2 closure on 30 June 2018.

== Show set up ==
When first broadcast, The Late Show shared a studio and set equipment with that of Live at Five which was being broadcast on STV Glasgow, the only differences being the names were changed at the back of the set from Live at Five to The Late Show. The show originally began broadcasting at a later time of 11 pm, however, along with the stations revamp, was brought forward to 10:30 pm. When the programme first began to air, it was recorded live from STV Edinburgh studios at Fountainbridge Studios.

== Show format ==
=== First inception (2016–17) ===
Before the programme's revamp on STV2, it had a small set with a small audience. It had two couches and a small table with ornaments situated on the set, Cameron would sit on one couch whilst guests would sit on the other couch where the guests are interviewed by Cameron.

=== Second inception (2017–18) ===
The programme, since its revamp, had followed the format of other late night programmes, most notably from the United States, such as The Late Late Show with Craig Ferguson in which Cameron came out and spoke to the studio audiences and greeted them before talking to them. After doing so, Cameron then introduced the first guest and interviewed them and interviewed the second guest. The programme featured regular sketches which involve Cameron interacting and talking with members of the public. Rather than live music, at the end of the programme, a music video was usually shown of a band whilst the end credits roll.

The format of interviewing guests are again very similar to that of other late night talk shows, where the guests sat to the right of Cameron, but left to the viewing audience, whilst Cameron sat behind a desk with a laptop and a microphone situated on the desk.

== See also ==
- Live at Five
