= Sunday Live =

- Genre: News, Current affairs
- Presented by: Stephen Jardine
- Country of origin: Scotland

Production
- Running time: 30 minutes
- Production companies: STV News (Scottish Television)

Original release
- Network: Scottish Television, Grampian Television
- Release: 15 January 2006

Sunday Live was a Sunday morning regional current affairs programme, broadcast on Scottish TV in Central Scotland and Grampian TV in the North (now both known as STV).

Stephen Jardine, a former Scotland Today newsreader (later co-host of STV's The Hour), fronted the programme, interviewing some of Scotland's best-known public figures and politicians. Louise White filled in for Stephen when he was away. A second series was planned for the Autumn of 2006, although the show never returned.
