= Gerry McCulloch =

Scottish TV sports presenter (born 1972/1973)

Gerry McCulloch (born 1972/1973) is a Scottish television presenter, sports reporter and football commentator.

== Broadcasting career ==
McCulloch is a former BBC Scotland, Setanta Sports and STV journalist and television presenter. He worked for Setanta as a commentator and voice-over artist for its Scottish Premier League and UEFA club competitions coverage.

While at STV, McCulloch presented The Live Hogmanay Show, and was a roving reporter for the Scottish kids magazine show Skoosh and the lifestyle magazine programme The Five Thirty Show. He was best known, however, for working as a sports news presenter on the Central Scotland edition of STV News at Six and, from March 2010, presenting the sports magazine show Sports Centre: Friday Night Football alongside Sheelagh McLaren. He also fronted STV's live coverage of Scotland v Brazil from the Emirates Stadium in February 2011, as well as hosting coverage of the Murrayfield Rugby Sevens.

McCulloch left STV in August 2011 immediately after it was announced that STV would be dropping Friday Night Football from their schedule, and shortly afterwards started appearing as an on-screen football reporter on Sky Sports' flagship Saturday football show Soccer Saturday.

== Other media work ==
McCulloch was a presenter for L!VE TV's local Edinburgh station at launch in 1997, and a presenter on Bid-Up.TV from 2000 to 2003. McCulloch was a host for Superscoreboard on Clyde 1 for two years, before being replaced by Gordon Duncan in May 2017. Within weeks, McCulloch signed on as a commentator and correspondent for Celtic TV, where he had worked earlier in his career.

He has worked as a media trainer and presenter coach.

== Personal life ==
McCulloch is a classically trained concert pianist. He was formerly married to nutritionist Amanda Hamilton.
