= Cosmetic Surgery Live =

UK reality television series

- Also known as: All New Cosmetic Surgery Live
- Genre: Reality television
- Directed by: Elliot Kew; Ralph Spark
- Presented by: Jan Adams; Vanessa Feltz; Danniella Westbrook
- Country of origin: United Kingdom
- No. of seasons: 2
- No. of episodes: 26

Production
- Executive producer: Elaine Hackett
- Producers: Elliot Kew; Nick Aarons
- Cinematography: Elliot Kew
- Running time: 60 minutes
- Production company: Endemol UK

Original release
- Network: Five

Cosmetic Surgery Live, "All New Cosmetic Surgery Live", is a UK TV show broadcast on Five. It is presented by Vanessa Feltz, cosmetic surgeon Dr. Jan Adams and Danniella Westbrook, and features both live and prerecorded footage of plastic surgery and body modification.

== Reception ==
The show was condemned by the British Association of Aesthetic Plastic Surgeons.

== See also ==
- London Welbeck Hospital - hospital featured in the show
