= Pure Dance =

Online radio station

Pure Dance is a British online radio station specialising in dance music.

== History ==
Originally active in the early 2000s, Pure Dance broadcast on satellite television and online via Windows Media Audio, RealPlayer, and mp3PRO streams. Typical music included trance, hardcore, house, and club music. Presenters included Warren Street, Dan Wood, Matt Forest, Ryan Morrison, Ben & Nixxi, Stu Allan, Billy 'Daniel' Bunter, Slipmatt, Lisa Lashes, Agnelli & Nelson, and Warp Brothers.

The station relaunched in mid-2024 and now broadcasts 24/7 online and via smart speakers, with plans to expand to small-scale DAB across the UK in 2025.

=== Closure ===
In November 2005, Pure Dance was put up for sale by its owners. It was reported at the time that the station had "a regular audience of nearly one million listeners every month, primarily in the 16–30 year old age group".

The station began falling silent for long periods in January 2006, with its website and web streams going offline. It was removed from the Sky EPG in early 2006 after over two weeks of silence.

=== Relaunch ===
In April 2024, archived shows from the original station were posted to Mixcloud, and Pure Dance relaunched later that year as an online station operated by Pure Dance (Radio) Limited, holding an Ofcom Digital Sound Programme licence. In September 2025 it launched on small-scale DAB in Milton Keynes and Loughborough, and is also carried on Radioplayer, TuneIn and smart speakers.
