= STV Radio =

Scottish independent local radio station

- Glasgow; Scotland
- Broadcast area: Scotland
- Frequencies: DAB/DAB+: Central Scotland; North East of Scotland; Tayside; Ayrshire; Inverness, Moray and the Highlands
- Branding: "Never the Same Song, All Day Long."

Programming
- Language: English
- Format: Classic hits/specialist programming
- Affiliations: STV

Ownership
- Owner: STV Group plc

History
- First air date: 6 January 2026; 9 months ago

Technical information
- Licensing authority: Ofcom

Links
- Webcast: STV Player
- Website: STV Radio

STV Radio is a Scottish digital radio station owned and operated by STV Group plc. Based in Pacific Quay, Glasgow, it broadcasts on STV Player and on smart speakers. The station is also available on DAB and DAB+ in Central Scotland, North East of Scotland, Tayside, Ayrshire, Inverness, Moray and the Highlands.

== History ==
STV Radio was announced as a new Scotland-focused commercial radio station in May 2025. It was confirmed the studio would be based at STV’s headquarters in Pacific Quay, Glasgow, and the mainstream music station, predominantly aimed at 35–54 year olds, would be available on DAB and online. The station is headed up by Graham Bryce, previously Chief Operating Officer of Bauer Media Group.

David Treasurer was announced as Programme Director for the station in June 2025. He joins STV from BBC Scotland, where he led BBC Radio Scotland's creative output for 10 years. He previously held senior positions in programming at Global Radio and Real Radio Scotland.

The station launched on Tuesday 6 January 2026 at 8 am, with Ewen & Cat at Breakfast. The station was originally due to launch on 7 January 2026, but this was rescheduled after the announcement of a strike by the National Union of Journalists (NUJ) on this date over planned cuts to the north edition of the STV News at Six. The NUJ stated that the station's launch is "at the expense of journalists' jobs".
