= Bong game =

British radio game show

The bong game is a phone-in game show created in the 1980s by the London-based radio station, Capital Radio. It is a game based purely on chance, but remained suspenseful because both rewards and risk increased as it progressed.

The game was invented by David Briggs, a former traffic reporter for Capital FM who went on to create Who Wants to Be a Millionaire? He also provided the smooth voice on the recordings. The contestants were primed by Capital Radio's Breakfast Show host, Chris Tarrant, whose collaboration with Briggs led to him becoming the presenter of Who Wants to Be a Millionaire? It was revived in 2024 when Jordan North joined the Capital Breakfast show.

== How it works ==
A recorded voice reads a sequence of numbers, representing an amount of money, that increases in value by irregular amounts.

For example: £1, £4, £20, £31, £70, £72, £300, £301, £600...

The recording ends, at an unpredictable point, with a "bong" sound. Players shouting "stop" before the "bong" wins the last sum of money mentioned. Players waiting too long and interrupted by the "bong" win nothing. Contestants who shouted "stop" would then be played the rest of the tape to see how much more they could have won.

The numbers would go up in varying increments, sometimes 3 or 4 numbers differing by only a few pounds, and then a jump of several hundred pounds. There were also various special tapes that had holidays on them, if the contestant waited long enough (without being bonged out).

An additional variation was the "Bouncing Bong" which, instead of just going up, went up and down randomly, with the contestant having no idea whether the next number would be higher or lower than the current one. Again, if the tape "bonged out" before the contestant said stop, they received nothing.

== Similar shows ==
- Colour of Money, which started in 2009, uses an extended version of the same principle, in which winnings are accumulated through repeated playings of the Bong Game
- Deal or No Deal
- The New Treasure Hunt
- The People Versus, daytime version, used a variant of the Bong Game; contestants would choose one of three sequences, one of which would permit the entire sum of money previously won to be retained before the "bong" was sounded
