= STV Rugby =

- Genre: Sport
- Presented by: Andy Nicol (2009–2010); Eilidh Barbour (2011–2013)
- Countries of origin: Scotland, United Kingdom
- Original language: English

Production
- Production locations: Glasgow, Scotland
- Running time: 30-60 minutes (includes adverts)
- Production company: STV News

Original release
- Network: STV
- Release: 6 September 2009

Related
- Scotsport Rugby Sunday, Sports Centre: Rugby

STV Rugby is a Scottish regional television programme that featured highlights of Pro12 rugby union matches involving Edinburgh Rugby and Glasgow Warriors. The programme, produced by the STV News department in Glasgow, was first broadcast in the 2009-10 season after a deal with the Celtic League Association, Scottish Rugby and STV was reached, following the closure of Setanta Sports in the UK.

Magners League rugby returned to STV for the 2010-11 season, under the new name of Sports Centre: Rugby. The STV Rugby brand returned for the 2011-12 season, after Sports Centre was axed. The 2012/2013 season was the last to be covered by STV Rugby.

== Broadcasts ==
The hour-long highlights programme was broadcast on Sunday afternoons during the Celtic League season and was available online on the STV Player after transmission. In addition to match highlights on Sundays, STV broadcast live coverage of the 1872 Cup games between Edinburgh Rugby and Glasgow Warriors during the Christmas and New Year period.

STV Rugby's first series was presented by former Scotland captain Andy Nicol with ex-Scottish & British Lions centre Scott Hastings and a studio guest every week. Outside broadcast coverage and commentary of games involving Welsh and Irish teams was provided by BBC Wales and Setanta Sports Ireland.

The 2011-12 series, presented by Eilidh Barbour, was broadcast on Sunday nights after the late ITV News bulletin, featuring highlights from the weekend's Pro12 games.

== Match commentator ==
- Rory Hamilton
