= Des McLean (comedian) =

Scottish stand-up comedian, actor and presenter

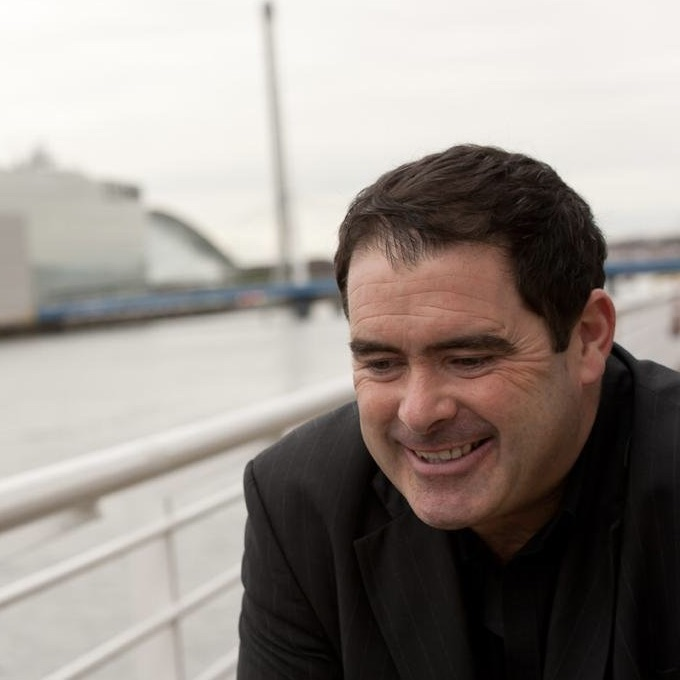
- Born: Glasgow, Scotland
- Occupations: comedian; presenter; actor; event host
- Years active: 2000-present
- Website: desmclean.com

Des McLean is a Scottish stand-up comedian, actor, and a presenter for radio and television from Glasgow. Billy Connolly has cited McLean as his favourite comedian.

== Comedy ==
McLean started working in comedy in 2000, and was a finalist in both the BBC New Comedy Awards and the Channel 4 programme So You Think You’re Funny?. In 2002 McLean made his debut at the Edinburgh Festival Fringe with his one-man show Des McLean 5 Stars and appeared on the BBC series Live Floor Show. The following year he performed at the Glasgow International and New York comedy festivals.

While still hosting daily radio shows McLean starred as The Tin Man in the Glasgow Pavilion Theatre pantomime Wizard of Oz in 2008 and Jiminy Cricket in Pinocchio in 2009. His flair for more serious acting won him the lead role in the theatre drama Two Tales of Love and Loss.

McLean's live stand-up comedy DVDs became top sellers in Scotland, Live At Glasgow City Halls in 2007, Talkin' Aboot Live in 2009, and Is This The Way To Armadillo? in 2010, his stand-up show at The Clyde Auditorium was recorded as a television special for STV.

McLean left Radio Clyde in 2010 and has worked since on television as a presenter for The One Show on BBC One. He has also hosted various STV programmes including Hogmanay, The Hour and Too Good to Waste.

Streetcast, McLean's comedy podcast, has also received rave reviews and his many YouTube sketches have over a million views. In October 2011 McLean completed a tour of New Zealand playing venues such as The Vector Arena and Hawkes Bay Opera House.

In June 2013 McLean performed his stand up at the "Top of the Riv" in the iconic Riviera Hotel in Las Vegas.

In 2014 Des McLean announced a new nationwide tour and released a live DVD, Des Mclean's A-Z of Scotland. He then took the production on the road in 2015, including a tour of Canada.

2016 saw Des embark on a brand new stand up tour, simply titled Des McLean Live. Then extra dates were added and the tour was extended onto 2017.

In 2019 McLean took The Glasgow Trip: Stand Up Special on a nationwide comedy tour, with fellow comedian Gary Little.

2020 and the beginning of lockdown saw Des create Comedy Club in Your Front Room with Zoom, an innovative, online comedy show which ran up to Christmas 2022. It featured acts all over the world, and was regarded by many as the best digitally based comedy production in the UK.

In 2022 through 2024, Des hosted the Des McLean Comedy Stage at the music festival Party at the Palace.

=== Comedy Clubs ===
As well as this, Des compères 9 recurring comedy clubs under the "Des McLean & Friends" brand.

Shows	Date
East Kilbride Comedy Club (EK Sports Club)	Monthly
Comedy at the Corbie (Corbie Inn)	Monthly
The Comedy Sauna (Cafe Mariana)	Monthly
Fintry Comedy Tent (Fintry Inn)	Monthly
Comedy at Kippen (Inn at Kippen)	Bi-monthly
Mill & Brae Comedy (Mill & Brae Hotel)	Quarterly
Broughty Ferry (Urban Beach at Glass Pavillion)	Quarterly
Comedy at the Crow (Crow Tavern)	Quarterly
Shotts Comedy Club (Marbles Club)	Quarterly

== Television ==
Show appearances
Channel	Title
BBC One	Live Floor Show
BBC One	New Comedy Awards Final
BBC One	The One Show
BBC Two	The Review Show
STV	Is This The Way To Armadillo?
STV	The Late Show
STV	The Hour
STV	Too Good To Waste
STV	The Hogmanay Show
STV	Live at Five
STV	Toffee In My Pocket
STV	The Night Shift
STV	The STV Children's Appeal
STV	My Life in 10 Pictures
STV	Postcode Challenge
STV	The Blether
STV	Scotland Today
STV	Scotland Tonight
STV	The Five Thirty Show
STV	Jak and Eddie's Scottish Kitchen
STV	The Riverside Show
SPP	The Glasgow Trip

=== The Glasgow Trip ===
In 2017 Des created the online TV series The Glasgow Trip with fellow Glasgow comedian Gary Little. They recorded twelve episodes and in 2019 the show was nominated for best online comedy at the Scottish Comedy Awards.

Overall	No. in series	Title
1	1	Roll With It
2	2	Health and Safety
3	3	Holding out for a Hero
4	4	Go West
5	5	Summer Special (part 1)
6	6	Summer Special (part 2)
7	1	The Big Break
8	2	Xmas Special
9	3	Back in the Game
10	4	Summer Special
11	5	Bodyguard
12	6	It's Happening

== Radio ==
In 2005 McLean was sought by Radio Clyde to provide sketches for the Bowie at Breakfast programme on Clyde 1. He soon became the co-host on the breakfast show with George Bowie, with the two men winning Sony Radio Academy Awards in the Best Breakfast and Entertainment Categories. McLean recorded a series of wind-up telephone calls for the programme, fooling stars that included Sean Connery, Rod Stewart and Joan Rivers. The daily calls became a series of four top selling CD releases, The Best of The 8.10 Sketches. McLean went on to host his own comedy sketch shows Friday Night Comedy and Des McLean's Sunday Sketch. In 2020 Des joined Nation radio hosting the morning and weekend shows with Suzie McGuire.

Shows
Station	Title
Radio Clyde	Bowie at Breakfast
Radio Clyde	Des McLean's Friday Night Comedy
Radio Clyde	Des McLean's Sunday Sketch
Nation Radio	Susie & Des Morning Show
Nation Radio	Susie & Des Weekend Show

== Theatre ==
=== I, Tommy ===
In January 2012 it was reported that McLean would be playing politician Tommy Sheridan, who was convicted of perjury during 2010, in a new play I, Tommy, written by Rab C. Nesbitt creator Ian Pattison. Mclean's performance as Sheridan achieved critical acclaim from both critics and leading actors. David Hayman on BBC2 Review show described Des' performance as "Extraordinary." The Times called it "Pitch Perfect" and The Scotsman "devastatingly accurate". The play was one of the most successful productions at The Edinburgh Fringe, and after a national tour of Scotland it finished the year at the Kings Theatre, Glasgow. There was a further run of I, Tommy in late 2013 in the Pavilion Theatre, Glasgow with Rosie Kane playing herself.

=== Bend it like Bertie ===
Des, in addition to continuing to compere and perform at comedy clubs the length and breadth of Scotland, took to the stage to play the part of Lisbon Lion Bertie Auld in the hilarious and heartwarming play Bend it like Bertie at Websters Theatre in Glasgow. The show, written by Glasgow playwright Jim Orr, was such a hit with theatre goers it embarked on a 2022 Scottish National tour performing in various locations. After seeing Des midway through the tour, the Auld family presented Des with Bertie Auld's Lisbon Lion blazer.

In 2023, 'Bend it Like Bertie' played a smash-hit run at the Pavilion Theatre, Glasgow in February and Des returned to Las Vegas to perform the play at the iconic Westgate International Theater in June. In 2024 Bend it like Bertie returned to the same theatre.

Shows
Date	Venue
2 September 2021	Websters Theatre, Glasgow
3 September 2021	Websters Theatre, Glasgow
4 September 2021	Websters Theatre, Glasgow
4 September 2021	Websters Theatre, Glasgow
13 November 2021	Beacon Arts Centre, Greenock
24 May 2022	Websters Theatre, Glasgow
25 May 2022	Websters Theatre, Glasgow
26 May 2022	Websters Theatre, Glasgow
27 May 2022	Motherwell Theatre, Motherwell
29 May 2022	Memorial Hall, Kilbarchan
31 May 2022	Corran Halls, Oban
1 June 2022	Whitehall Theatre, Dundee
2 June 2022	Regal Theatre, Bathgate
3 June 2022	Howden Park Centre, Livingston
4 June 2022	Eastwood Park Theatre, Giffnock
5 June 2022	Rothes Halls, Glenrothes
8 June 2022	Eden Court, Inverness
9 June 2022	Queens Hall, Dunoon
10 June 2022	FTH Theatre, Falkirk
11 June 2022	The Brunton, Musselburgh
12 June 2022	Tivoli Theatre, Aberdeen
9 February 2023	Pavilion Theatre, Glasgow
10 February 2023	Pavilion Theatre, Glasgow
11 February 2023	Pavilion Theatre, Glasgow
11 February 2023	Pavilion Theatre, Glasgow
1 June 2023	Grace's Irish Sports Bar, Glasgow
6 June 2023	Westgate Theater, Las Vegas
15 July 2023	Amharclann Gweedore Theatre, Ireland
8 February 2024	Pavilion Theatre, Glasgow
9 February 2024	Pavilion Theatre, Glasgow
10 February 2024	Pavilion Theatre, Glasgow
10 February 2024	Pavilion Theatre, Glasgow

=== And If You Know The History ===
In 2025, Des played the lead role in the new Jim Orr production And If You Know The History. It follows the Fergus McCann take-over of the club in 1994, one of the darkest times in the clubs' history. The show premiered with a sell-out run in Websters Theatre, Glasgow.

== Discography ==
=== DVD releases ===
Year	Title
2007	Live at Glasgow City Halls
2009	Talkin' Aboot Live
2010	Is This The Way To Armadillo?
2014	Des McLean's A to Z of Scotland

=== CD releases ===
==== "Bolt Ya Rocket!" - Best of the 8:10 Sketches Vol. 1 (2007) ====
#	Track name
1	This is no ordinary call
2	Billy and the rapping granny
3	Ina half day on Tuesday
4	Educating Plunger
5	Paddy the ringmaster
6	Not a lot of people know this call
7	School's out for Ina
8	Don't call me Knobby
9	Santa Bawbag
10	Billy of the Rovers
11	Advance Ned Speak series 6
12	Trunk Call
13	Ina's passage to India
14	Paddy's close encounter
15	Billy's super scoreboard
16	Plunge's Caribbean Carnival
17	Tommy talking tabloids
18	Paddy's directory dilemma
19	Plunge the wedding planner
20	A couple of knobs
21	Lee-Anne's labour of love
22	Paddy's das boot sale
23	Johnny Beattie's birthday bash

==== "Talkin' Aboot!" - Best of the 8:10 Sketches Vol. 2 (2008) ====
#	Track name
1	Billy and Rod Stewart
2	Plunge Limo
3	Paddy Catalogue
4	Tommy Crisis Loan
5	Louis and The MacDonald Brothers
6	Ina 10k
7	Plunge Vital Records
8	Billy and Joan Rivers part 1
9	Billy and Joan Rivers part 2
10	Paddy and Jack McPhee
11	Tommy Asda
12	Nobby Bookshop
13	Ina's Lost Keys
14	Plunge Buckfast Abbey
15	Billy and Melvyn Bragg
16	Louis This Is Your Life
17	Paddy Mole Screening
18	Tommy Bingo Caller
19	Billy Newspaper Interview
20	Ina Decking
21	Paddy Popcorn
22	Tommy Interview
23	Billy impersonator

==== "The Big Chap" - Best of the 8:10 Sketches Vol. 3 (2009) ====
#	Track name
1	Plunge Ned Bank
2	Billy & 007
3	Paddy Vending Machine
4	Wolfgang Toy Poodle
5	Ina 3 Legged dog
6	Ralph Britain's Got Talent
7	Plunge The Phone Hacker
8	Paddy Fart Dog Whistle
9	Wolfgang Reverse Call
10	Billy Chopper
11	Ina Unlucky 13th part1
12	Ralph Shooting Sparrows
13	Ina Lucky 13th part 2
14	Plunge Camp America
15	Wolfgang Crockery Crisis
16	Paddy Pussy Zapper
17	Billy On Last Parky
18	Plunge Valet
19	Wolfgang Burger King
20	Ralph Budgie Reverse Call
21	Ina Clock Change
22	Billy Parking Ticket
23	Wolfgang French Polisher
24	Paddy Hearing Glasses
25	Billy Rich List

==== "Hauf Day On a Tuesday" - Best of the 8:10 Sketches Vol. 4 (2010) ====
#	Track name
1	Ina call Mark
2	Plunge Ned Awards 2009
3	Paddy and Mrs.Prentice
4	Jack Ferry and Son
5	Billy and Archie McPherson
6	Ina T in the Park Ticket
7	Plunge Jeremy Kyle
8	Craig Levein 118
9	Paddy Thomas Cook
10	Jack Ferry B and O
11	George Burley Dutch Interview
12	Gavin Strang Mall
13	Wolfgang Special K
14	Paddy Chatline
15	Plunge Mothers Day
16	Billy CNN USA
17	Ina The Night Garden
18	Paddy Post Box
19	Jack Ferry Travel Agent
20	Plunge Darth Vader Mask
21	Tommy and Smeato
22	Rab C X Factor
23	Ina Halloween Mask
24	Wolfgang Cuckoo Clock
25	Come Dine With Jack
26	Paddy Bingo Caller

==== Best of the 8:10 Sketches - Limited Edition Volumes 1 & 2 (2011) ====
After McLean's 4 CDs were released, a special boxset was made compiling his first 2 CDs, including a total of 46 tracks.

== Personal life ==
McLean was brought up in the east-end of Glasgow and now lives in Robroyston with his wife Alison and son Harry.
