= Debi Edward =

Scottish television broadcaster

Debi Edward is a Scottish television broadcaster, currently working for ITN as Asia Correspondent on ITV News.

Originally from Aberdeen, Edward joined STV in 2005 as a reporter and presenter of Scotland Today's weekday morning bulletins at 5.25am during GMTV, and occasionally the weekend bulletins. In 2007, she co-presented STV's daily magazine programme, The Five Thirty Show, alongside Stephen Jardine. Edward left The Five Thirty Show in May 2008 to become ITV's Scotland Correspondent, and was replaced by ex-ITV Morning News presenter Rachel McTavish.

Edward was appointed China Correspondent of ITV News in February 2016.

Edward was visiting Australia during the 2019/2020 bushfire crisis in her work as a foreign correspondent. During a visit to Kangaroo Island (South Australia) she was the target of a prank involving a dropbear, her reaction to which went viral.
