= The Hour (2009 TV programme) =

- The Hour logo, September–October 2011
- Genre: Lifestyle, Features
- Presented by: Michelle McManus, Stephen Jardine, Tam Cowan
- Country of origin: Scotland
- Original language: English

Production
- Producer: Tom Cara
- Production locations: STV Studios, Glasgow, Scotland
- Camera setup: Multi-camera
- Running time: 60 minutes (includes commercials)
- Production company: STV Studios

Original release
- Network: STV
- Release: 26 May 2009 – 11 October 2011

Related
- The Five Thirty Show; Live at Five

The Hour is a lifestyle magazine programme that was broadcast on STV, the ITV franchise in Northern and Central Scotland, premiering on 26 May 2009. Originally broadcast each weekday afternoon at 5pm, the programme was presented for much of its run by Michelle McManus and Stephen Jardine and broadcast from STV's Pacific Quay studios in Glasgow. The programme moved to a weekly peak time slot in September 2011, but was cancelled in October 2011.

== History ==
The Hour began in May 2009 as an hour-long replacement for The Five Thirty Show, which had aired on weekdays since January 2008. Whilst its male presenter, Stephen Jardine, remained with the programme since its launch, his female co-host rotated between various personalities until October 2009, when it was announced that regular guest host Michelle McManus would become a main co-host.

Despite replacing The Five Thirty Show, The Hour's focus was more lifestyle-orientated than its predecessor, which was originally intended to cover the main issues and news topics of the day. Features on The Hour included entertainment, TV, movies, cookery, health, gardening, fashion, celebrity guests and other topics.

In May 2011, Stephen Jardine announced he was leaving STV to form a PR company. McManus continued presenting the programme with various guest presenters until the end of the daytime version of The Hour on Friday 22 July 2011.

In June 2011, STV announced the programme would be cut from five days a week to once a week and moved to a prime time slot of Tuesdays at 8pm from 20 September 2011. McManus remained to present the relaunched programme, alongside Tam Cowan.

Low ratings and criticism over the peak time version of the programme led to STV's decision to cancel the programme just four weeks after the relaunch. The last edition of the programme aired on 11 October 2011, two days before it was cancelled.

=== Spin-offs ===
The Hour spawned two spin-off programmes, usually as an extension to a segment of the main 5pm programme – The Chef's Apprentice was a special stand, looking for Scotland's best young chef. The judges were Sue Lawrence, Jeff Bland, Steven Doherty, Jean-Christophe Novelli and Steven Kitchen. The final was aired on Monday, 23 November 2009.

Another segment of the show was Fashion Hijack (presented by Vicky Lee), where a team of style and beauty experts transformed the look of women across the country. A special Christmas edition was aired out-with The Hour on Wednesday, 23 December 2009.

Stephen, Michelle and the team pre-recorded a special programme, The Midnight Hour for STV's Hogmanay line-up in 2010. The show took viewers into the New Year of 2011.

In January 2011, a short programme called New Year, New You was aired every evening at 5.55. This was shown as separate from The Hour, but it took up the last five minutes normally occupied by the programme.

On Saturday 20 August 2011, a special edition, The Hour Goes to the Races, aired live from Perth Races on Royal Charities Day, presented by Michelle McManus and STV News West anchor John MacKay.

== The Team ==
=== Main presenters ===
- Michelle McManus (2009–11)
- Tam Cowan (peak-time version, 2011)
- Stephen Jardine (2009–11)

=== Guest co-presenters ===
- Kaye Adams (2009)
- Connie Fisher (2009)
- Michelle McManus (2009)
- Vicky Lee (2009)
- Dawn Steele (2009)
- Cat Harvey (2009, 2011)
- Hamish Clark (2009)
- Dorothy Paul (2009)
- Lulu (2009)
- Michelle Watt (2009–2010)
- Jenni Falconer (2009)
- Carol Smillie (2009–2010)
- Michelle Mone (2009)
- Aggie MacKenzie (2009–2010)
- Des McLean (2009–2010)
- Julyan Sinclair (2009–2010)
- Scott Hastings (2009–2010)
- Colin Kelly (2009–2011)
- Angus Purden (2010)
- Bruce Devlin (2010)
- Darius Campbell (2010)
- Grant Stott (2010–2011)
- Amanda Hamilton (2010–2011)
- John Amabile (2011)
- Joe McGann (2011)
- Sanjeev Kohli (2011)
- Tony Roper (2011)
- Ewen Cameron (2011)

=== Experts and correspondents ===
- Stella Bartram – Fitness
- Tom Cannavan – Wine
- Julie Hannah, Tori MacKenzie – Fashion
- Pete Jackson – Gardening
- Colin Kelly – Gadgets
- Sue Lawrence – Cookery
- Anita Manning – Antiques
- Nick Priestly – Floristry
- Dr. Debbie Wake – Health
- Lesley Smith – History
- Rachel Henderson – Crafts
- Drew Currie - Interior Design

== Related shows ==
- The Five Thirty Show
- Live at Five
