= STV Sports Centre =

Former Scottish regional sports stand

- Genre: Sport
- Presented by: Friday Night Football: Gerry McCulloch, Sheelagh McLaren; RaboDirect Pro12 Rugby: Rory Hamilton
- Country of origin: Scotland
- Original language: English

Production
- Production locations: Glasgow, Scotland
- Running time: Main programmes: 30 minutes; Bulletins: 4 minutes
- Production company: STV News

Original release
- Network: STV
- Release: 5 March 2010 – June 2011

Related
- STV Rugby

STV Sports Centre was a Scottish regional sports stand, covering the two STV franchise areas of Northern and Central Scotland. The strand was produced by the STV News department in Glasgow (STV Central), with contributions from STV North's news team in Aberdeen.

Until May 2011, Sports Centre aired two different programmes: Friday Night Football, broadcast on Friday nights at 10:30pm, and Magners League Rugby – airing on Sundays straight after the late ITV News bulletin.

Short Sports Centre news bulletins also aired on Monday – Thursday nights at 10:35pm during the late regional bulletins from STV News.

The first series of STV Sports Centre, launched just two years after the long-running Scotsport was axed, featured interviews, special reports, analysis, a preview of the weekend's football and competitions. Gerry McCulloch and Sheelagh McLaren were the main co-hosts, with Stefani Dailly and Chris Harvey as relief presenters in their absence.

== Friday Night Football ==
The Friday night programme was relaunched on 13 August 2010 as the hour-long Friday Night Football, focusing on previews and analysis of the Clydesdale Bank Scottish Premier League and featuring action from midweek UEFA Champions League and Europa League fixtures. The series was introduced as part of a two-year production and archive services deal between STV and the SPL.

A few weeks into the new series, STV decided to shorten the programme to the original 30 minutes. The programme was axed in June 2011.

== Sports Centre Rugby ==
Sports Centre Rugby was broadcast on Sunday nights after the late ITV News bulletin. It featured highlights from the weekend's Celtic League games with extended coverage of matches involving Glasgow Warriors and Edinburgh Rugby.

Originally broadcast as STV Rugby, the programme was introduced in September 2009 after a deal was reached between the Celtic League Association, Scottish Rugby and STV, following the closure of Setanta Sports' UK operations.

The Sports Centre strand was discontinued in 2011, with highlights of the 2011–12 rugby season, now known as Pro12 airing under the STV Rugby banner once again.
