= The People Versus =

2000 British television series

- Genre: Game show
- Created by: David Briggs; Steven Knight; Mike Whitehill
- Presented by: Kirsty Young; Kaye Adams
- Composer: Keith Strachan
- Country of origin: United Kingdom
- Original language: English
- No. of series: 2
- No. of episodes: 125

Production
- Running time: 30 minutes (inc. adverts)
- Production company: Celador Productions

Original release
- Network: ITV
- Release: 13 August 2000 – 18 June 2002

The People Versus is a British game show that aired on ITV from 13 August 2000 to 18 June 2002. Series 1 was hosted by Kirsty Young and Series 2 by Kaye Adams. The central format was that the questions were sent in by the viewers.

== Formats ==
=== Series 1 ===
For every question the contestants got correct, they won £5,000. The rules were: In each round the players were shown five questions from one of their specialist subjects. In Round One, each contestant had to attempt and answer correctly one of those five questions - "one of five to stay alive". In Round Two, on a different subject they had to answer two correctly to stay in, Round Three, three, Round Four, four and finally in Round Five, they had to answer all five. In each round, the player could, if they wanted, earn more cash by answering more questions than the quota required, again for £5,000 a piece. To help, each player was shown all five questions at the start. Each player was also given three 'flips'. If a player wanted to use a flip, they could substitute any of the five given questions for another one. Also, if they had the cash, they could elect to 'buy' answers to questions at £10,000 a time.

Finishing Round 5 meant the contestant would begin again at Round 1. There was no limit on the amount of money someone could win which theoretically meant someone could win more than a million pounds, the top prize of Who Wants to Be a Millionaire?, although no contestant ever won anywhere near this amount of money.

If a person got their question wrong, they lost all money in that round and their seat in the game went to the person who set the question.

=== Series 2 ===
Studio contestants were asked general knowledge questions set by the public. The rounds were as follows:

- Round one: one question worth £100, and four passes
- Round two: two questions worth £250, and three passes
- Round three: three questions worth £500, and two passes
- Round four: four questions worth £1,000, and one pass
- Round five: five questions worth £3,000, and no passes

The contestant had a four-minute time limit to finish the rounds. Running out of time meant they lost.

If the contestant was stuck on a question, he or she could pass (which discards the question for good), but if they cannot pass any more, they must use a 'Flip'. A contestant had three flips at their disposal. These substituted the question for an alternative one on their specialist subject.

Finishing Round 5 meant that the contestant would bank the £3,000 and have the chance to restart from Round 1 again with their Flips restored. As in the first series there is an unlimited amount of money to be won. The highest sum of money won on the daytime version was £15,900.

If a contestant answered a question incorrectly or could not give an answer within the time limit, then they were knocked out of the game. The person who set the question won £100. (Later in the series this changed to £50 for a Round 1 knockout, with no money being awarded for an elimination in a later round.) The Bong Game was then played.

The studio contestant had the choice of 3 Bong games. One of these three games did not have a bong in it all and went all the way to the money he/she had in play. An automated voice read out increasing amounts of money. The aim was to stop the voice before the bong sounded. The contestant had to press a button to stop the voice and win whatever was shown on the screen.

If the contestant managed to beat the bong, the rest of the money in play went to the person who caught the studio contestant out. If the studio player failed to beat the bong, then they would win nothing and the member of the public won all of the money in play. The contestant then found out where the bong would have come in.

== Transmissions ==
Series	Start date	End date	Episodes	Presenter
1	13 August 2000	4 September 2000	10	Kirsty Young
2	25 June 2001	18 June 2002	115	Kaye Adams

Series 1 was broadcast each weekday around 20.30. From Series 2 the series was moved to early evening broadcasting each weekday around 17.00 until 2 November. From 5 November 2001 the series was broadcast on a Monday and Friday with episodes of Night and Day being shown on Tuesday, Wednesday and Thursday. Two episodes were never broadcast until Challenge aired them in 2007.

== International versions ==
Country	Name	Host	Channel	The values of each round	Year aired
Georgia	ხალხის პირისპირ Khalkhis p'irisp'ir	Natia Abramia	Rustavi 2	Round 1: ლ50 Round 2: ლ100 Round 3: ლ200 Round 4: ლ400 Round 5: ლ1,000	2002–2004
Hong Kong	各出其謀; Gok ceot kei mau	Meg Lam	ATV	Round 1: HK$5,000; Round 2: HK$10,000; Round 3: HK$20,000; Round 4: HK$40,000; Round 5: HK$100,000	1 January 2002 – 29 March 2002
Russia	Народ против Narod protiv	Dmitry Dibrov	Channel One	Round 1: ₽1,000; Round 2: ₽2,500; Round 3: ₽5,000; Round 4: ₽15,000; Round 5: ₽50,000	26 February 2002 – 30 August 2002
Russia	Народ против Narod protiv	Alexander Miloserdov	REN TV	Round 1: ₽1,000; Round 2: ₽2,500; Round 3: ₽5,000; Round 4: ₽15,000; Round 5: ₽50,000	7 April 2003 – 3 September 2003
Serbia	Сам против свих Sam protiv svih	Ivan Bauer	RTS 1	Round 1: din 1,000; Round 2: din 5,000; Round 3: din 10,000; Round 4: din 30,000; Round 5: din 100,000	20 December 2002 – 3 October 2005
Serbia	Narod protiv	Miloš Milovanović	B92	Round 1: din 1,000; Round 2: din 5,000; Round 3: din 10,000; Round 4: din 30,000; Round 5: din 100,000	17 February 2009 – 10 July 2009
Spain	Madrid Reta	Javier Capitán	Telemadrid	Round 1: €100; Round 2: €250; Round 3: €500; Round 4: €1,000; Round 5: €3,000	2003
Spain	Euskadi Reta	Jorge Fernández	ETB 2	Round 1: €50; Round 2: €100; Round 3: €200; Round 4: €400; Round 5: €1,000	2004
Turkey	Türkiye Yarışıyor	Osmantan Erkır	TRT	Round 1: TL 100,000,000; Round 2: TL 250,000,000; Round 3: TL 500,000,000; Round 4: TL 1,500,000,000; Round 5: TL 5,000,000,000	2003–2004
United Kingdom	The People Versus	Kirsty Young	ITV		13 August 2000 – 4 September 2000
United Kingdom	The People Versus	Kaye Adams	ITV	Round 1: £100; Round 2: £250; Round 3: £500; Round 4: £1,000; Round 5: £3,000	25 June 2001 – 18 June 2002

=== Georgia ===
Called ხალხის პირისპირ (Khalkhis P'irisp'ir, lit. in front of people). The show was originally aired on Rustavi 2 between 2002 and 2004.

The values of each round were 50 lari, 100 lari, 200 lari, 400 lari and 1,000 lari respectively.

=== Hong Kong ===
Broadcast on ATV, called 各出其謀 (lit. everyone gives his strategies) and hosted by Meg Lam (林建明).

On 31 December 2001, on the last episode of the first series of Who Wants to Be a Millionaire?, the last contestant(Paul Yip) was invited to play the game, but he failed to finish Round 5 and he lost the Bong Game.

The first regular episode was aired on 1 January 2002 and the last was on 29 March 2002.

The values of each round were HK$5,000, HK$10,000, HK$20,000, HK$40,000 and HK$100,000 (about £6,451) respectively.

=== Russia ===
Called Народ против (Narod Protiv, lit. people against). The show was originally aired on Channel One, then a new series aired on REN TV. Hosted by Dmitry Dibrov and Alexander Miloserdov.

The values of each round were 1,000 rubles, 2,500 rubles, 5,000 rubles, 15,000 rubles and 50,000 rubles (about £1,029) respectively.

=== Serbia ===
In Serbia, The People Versus aired on RTS 1 (between 2002 and 2005) as Сам против свих (Sam protiv svih, lit. Alone vs. all) .

In 2009, B92 and Advantage bought rights and will air it as Narod protiv / Народ против (lit. people against). The new season began airing on 19 February 2009.

=== Spain ===
In Spain, it was aired on Telemadrid as Madrid Reta in 2003, hosted by Javier Capitán.

==== Basque Country ====
In Basque Country, it was aired on ETB2 as Euskadi Reta in 2004, hosted by Jorge Fernández.

=== Turkey ===
In the Republic of Turkey, it was produced by STR was titled Türkiye Yarışıyor airing on TRT between 2003 and 2004 and was hosted by Osmantan Erkır.

The values of each round were 100,000,000 lira, 250,000,000 lira, 500,000,000 lira, 1,500,000,000 lira and 5,000,000,000 lira respectively.
