= Derek Acorah's Ghost Towns =

- Starring: Derek Acorah
- Country of origin: United Kingdom
- Original language: English
- No. of series: 3
- No. of episodes: 24 (65 inc. Revealed, Live, Live Early Doors, Live Revealed, Compilation episodes)

Production
- Producer: Ruggie Media
- Running time: 60 minutes (with commercials)

Original release
- Network: LivingTV
- Release: 7 November 2005 – 28 November 2006

Derek Acorah's Ghost Towns is a paranormal reality television series which features noted Medium Derek Acorah as he visits towns in the UK to investigate hauntings. The team would travel in the "Ghost Town Van" and would allow townsfolk to tell the team about their encounters with hauntings in their home town. During the investigation, Derek would visit a random house and give the owner a psychic reading this was "Doorstep Divination." The show aired from 7 November 2005 until 28 November 2006.

== Series guide ==
=== Series one ===
The first series aired every Monday night at 9pm on LivingTV between 7 November and 12 December. The show was hosted by Danniella Westbrook and Angus Purden. After each episode aired, a "behind the scenes" show "Ghost Towns Revealed" aired which followed the team as they filmed the episode.

1. Faversham (7 November 2005)
2. Shrewsbury (14 November 2005)
3. Maidstone (21 November 2005)
4. Northampton (28 November 2005)
5. Bedford (5 December 2005)
6. Royston (12 December 2005)

=== Series two ===
The second series aired every Tuesday night at 9pm on LivingTV between 31 January 2006 and 4 April 2006. Once again, Danniella Westbrook and Angus Purden joined Derek on the show.

1. Stafford (31 January 2006)
2. Blackpool (7 February 2006)
3. Ely (14 February 2006)
4. Oswestry (21 February 2006)
5. Canterbury (28 February 2006)
6. Lowestoft (7 March 2006)
7. Salisbury (14 March 2006)
8. Hull (21 March 2006)
9. Lincoln (28 March 2006)
10. Devizes (4 April 2006)

=== Series Three ===
The show returned for a third series at the end of 2006. It aired every Tuesday night from 3 October 2006 until 28 November 2006. This series featured a "new look" for the show as there were new opening titles and new presenters. Myleene Klass and Rhodri Owen presented this series. This was the last series of Ghost Towns to air.

1. Swansea (3 October 2006)
2. Chester (10 October 2006)
3. Stirling (17 October 2006)
4. Worcester (24 October 2006)
5. Dorchester (7 November 2006)
6. Guildford (14 November 2006)
7. Glasgow (21 November 2006)
8. Greenwich (28 November 2006)

== Live ==
In early 2006, Ghost Towns broadcast two live events. The events would each last for three nights from 9pm until midnight. The studio host for the show was Liz Bonnin. Danniella Westbrook was unable to take part in the first live event and was replaced by Emmerdale actress Nicola Wheeler. Angus Purden was present for both live events and Danniella Westbrook returned for the second live event. Two companion shows aired during the live events. "Early Doors" aired 1 hour before the investigation began which featured interviews with the team. "Revealed" allowed viewers to call into the studio to discuss the nights events. This show aired for 1 hour after the live event.

Episodes

- York
  - Night One (27 January 2006)
  - Night Two (28 January 2006)
  - Night Three (29 January 2006)
- Halifax
  - Night One (10 March 2006)
  - Night Two (11 March 2006)
  - Night Three (12 March 2006)

=== Ending ===
Although the series still had good ratings and a fourth series was planned for 2007, Acorah announced plans to take a break from the show to focus on a large scale UK Tour demonstrating his mediumship. Once his tour finished he returned to television and LivingTV with Paranormal Egypt instead of a fourth series of Ghost Towns.

== DVD ==
All three series of Derek Acorah's Ghost Towns are available on DVD.

== Book ==
A book based on the investigation of the locations of series one is available. It was written by Derek Acorah and has contributions from Danniella Westbrook and Angus Purden.
