= Sue Lawrence =

Scottish cookery and food writer

Sue Lawrence is a Scottish cookery and food writer, noted for her promotion of traditional Scottish recipes and regional produce, and also a writer of historical novels set in Scotland, exploring women's lives.

== Biography ==
Lawrence first became well-known after winning the BBC cookery programme MasterChef in 1991.

She wrote a regular column for Scotland on Sunday for several years and was Cookery Editor for the Sunday Times for six years, and has also contributed to Sainsbury's magazine, Woman & Home, Country Living and BBC Good Food magazine. She also regularly appears on British and Australian television and until 2011 was one of the food experts on STV's early evening lifestyle show The Hour. In radio, she is a regular on BBC Radio 4's Kitchen Cabinet, chaired by Jay Rayner.

Raised in Dundee, Lawrence now lives in Edinburgh with her husband, Pat. She has three adult children and enjoys spending time with her grandchildren.

== Cookbooks ==
- Feasting on Herbs (1995)
- On Baking (1996)
- Scots Cooking (2000)
- Sue Lawrence's Scottish Kitchen (2003)
- Sue Lawrence's Book of Baking (2004)
- A Cook's Tour of Scotland (2006)
- Eating In (2011)

== Historical Novels ==
Lawrence has also written a number of historical novels featuring dark aspects of Scotland's past. Her debut novel, Fields of Blue Flax, was published in 2015 by Freight Books. She published a historical thriller titled The Night He Left in 2015. Another novel The Last Train was published in 2016 by Freight Books in the UK, and Allen and Unwin elsewhere. This novel features the 17 day aftermath of the Tay Bridge Disaster in 1879, but includes a modern story. Down to the Sea, her first historical mystery of several to examine the injustices faced by women in Scottish history, was published by Contraband in 2019 and concerns the fragile and often dangerous circumstances of women working in the fishing industry in the harbours of Victorian Scotland. 'The Wee Review' described this book as a "fast-paced and enjoyable read" that "cements Lawrence as a skilled creator of historical mysteries". The Unreliable Death of Lady Grange, published in 2020, is a fictionalised account of the life of Rachel Chiesley, Lady Grange, who was summarily abducted at the hands of agents of her husband and exiled on the Monach Isles and then to St Kilda, where she ultimately died. The novel is viewed from Lady Grange's point of view, while until recently her husband's account has been better known and documented. 'The Edinburgh Reporter' described it as a "superlative page-turner", crediting it for offering a "clear-sighted look at the treatment of women". A forthcoming novel, The Green Lady, examines the fate of the wives of Alexander Seton, 1st Earl of Dunfermline, when Lilias Drummond, daughter of Patrick Drummond, 3rd Lord Drummond, and successive wives failed to produce a male heir.

== Awards ==
- Glenfiddich Food and Drink Awards - Best Regional Writer 2003
