= Grant Stott =

Scottish football commentator (born 1967)

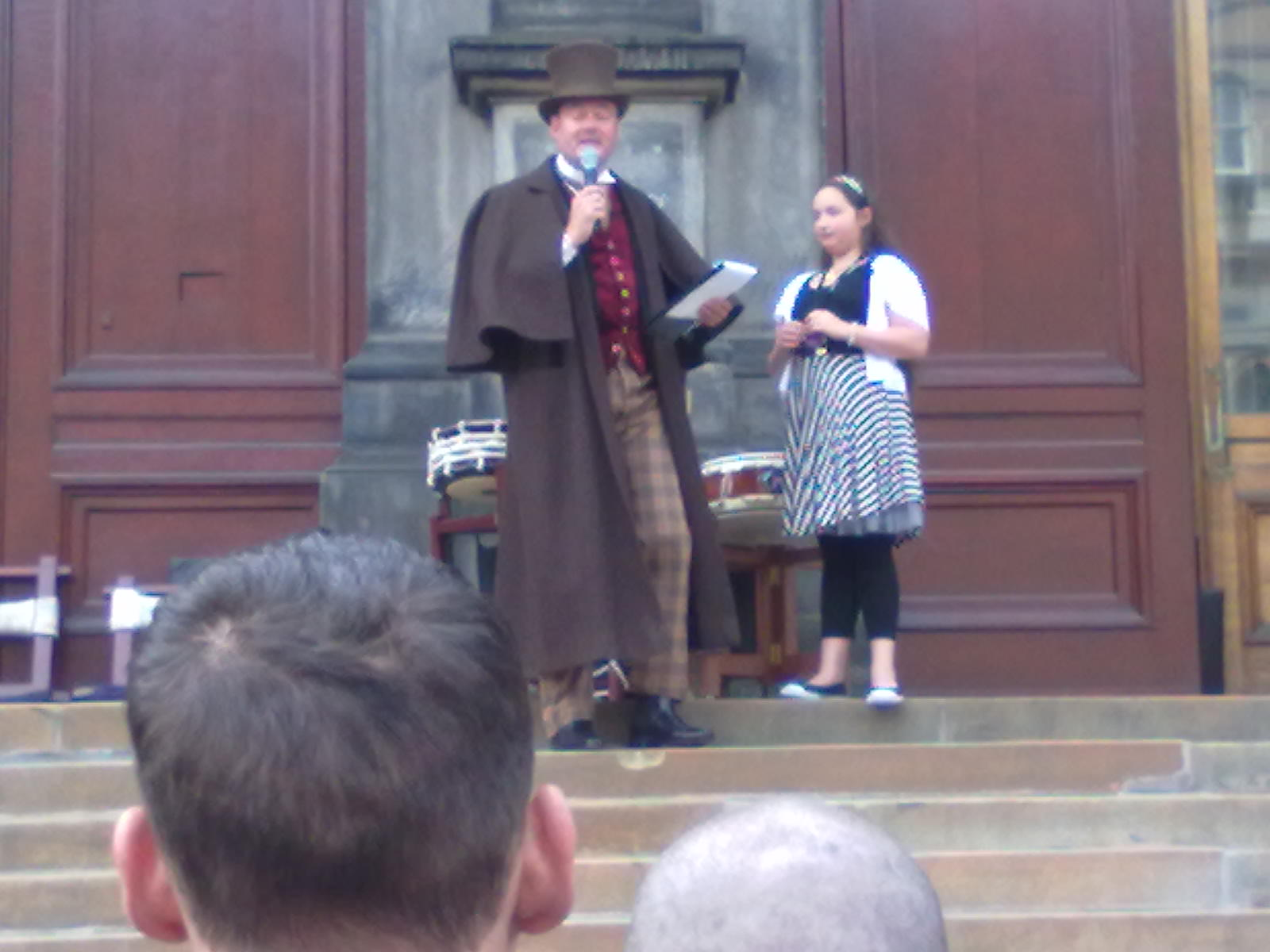
In Victorian dress, Grant Stott leads the reopening ceremony for the redeveloped National Museum of Scotland in July 2011

Grant Stott (born 13 May 1967) is a Scottish broadcaster, radio DJ, television presenter, Scottish cultural commentator, master of ceremonies, events host, actor, and part-time pantomime villain from Edinburgh. He formerly worked as a DJ on Edinburgh radio station Forth 1 until January 2017. He then joined BBC Radio Scotland and now appears as Sam Spiller on the television soap opera River City. Stott is the brother of television presenter John Leslie.

== Early life ==
Grant Stott was born on 13 May 1967 in Elsie Inglis Hospital, Edinburgh. He attended Bruntsfield Primary School for seven years (August 1972 - June 1980), and then James Gillespie's High School for six years (August 1980 – December 1985). He left James Gillespie's in 1985 to become a policeman with Lothian and Borders Police for four years (January 1986 – February 1990) and left the police force in 1990 to start a career in radio.

== Career ==
=== 1990s ===
Stott's broadcasting career began as a Radio Presenter with Edinburgh Station “Max-AM” in February 1990. He joined the “Forth-FM” team in September 1990 and presented several shows throughout the early-mid 1990s. Shortly after joining Forth FM he enjoyed a two year run as presenter on BBC Radio Scotland’s schools programme for primary 4–7 pupils Check This (1990–1992), from there he came to present a number of educational programmes for the BBC such as Around Scotland: The Highland Clearances in October 1991 followed by GO45, and the school holiday spin off GO4X with Sally Gray for three series in 1991 - 1993, He presented BBC Scotland's coverage of Children in Need alongside main host Hazel Irvine between November 1992 and 1997.

In 1993 Stott began hosting the Sunday morning children’s TV show Wemyss Bay 902101 on Scottish Television with Eric Cullen and Arlene Stuart as co-hosts, Wemyss Bay 902101 was a replacement for Glen Michael's Cartoon Cavalcade the former No. 1 kids programme in Scotland that ended in December 1992. Stott hosted the first children's series of Now You See it which aired as part of Wemyss Bay 90210 throughout its short-lived tenure, the show only lasted 15 months before being cancelled in April 1994 and quickly replaced by a new children's programme called Skoosh at that point, In addition to Wemyss Bay, Stott presented Vox-Pops on the lunchtime edition of Scotland Today, wrote his own children’s page Stottspot for The Edinburgh Evening News and began presenting Children’s BBC Scotland mid-mornings for the first time on BBC 1 Scotland in early July and mid-October school holidays, then that Christmas, Stott made his pantomime debut at The King’s Theatre Glasgow in their production of Dick Whittington with Allan Stewart and Christopher Biggins in December 1993.

In 1994 he continued to work on education programmes for BBC TV Scotland, This time a brand new series of programmes called See You, See Me (where many of the episodes were recorded with Wilma Kennedy over many years) Episodes included studying maps, the Vikings, Romans and the 1960s. Stott introduced Children’s BBC Scotland for the second time, albeit this time solo by presenting the mid-morning slot on BBC 1 Scotland in the first week of July then the early morning breakfast show on BBC 2 Scotland in the second week of the October half-term holiday, He returned to the panto stage that Christmas with an appearance in Edinburgh’s King’s Theatre where he first played the role of Little John in Babes In The Wood throughout December 1994.

He left Radio Forth in April 1995 to work more in television, from there he got his national TV break by presenting alongside Zoe Ball in the form of Fully Booked, BBC Scotland’s BAFTA nominated Saturday Morning Children’s show for BBC1. The show ran for 22 weeks throughout the summer and was re-commissioned for a further 22 weeks in 1996 before it had finished its first series, Stott then presented Children’s BBC Scotland for the third year, where he was joined by Gail Porter to host the mid-morning slot on BBC 1 Scotland in the first week of July then the early morning breakfast show on BBC 2 Scotland in the second week of the October half-term holiday, Stott and Porter teamed up to host the third and final series of Mega-Mag (October 1995 – October 1996) and in November he realised a childhood ambition by guest presenting an episode of Jackanory.

For the rest of the 1990s, Sott was still appearing in pantomimes and presenting more TV programmes for BBC, STV and Grampian - including Fully Booked with Sarah Vandenbergh, Children’s BBC Scotland summer and October holiday breakfast shows with Gail Porter on BBC 2 Scotland, Children In Need as part of BBC Scotland’s output, Feeling Good with Arlene Stuart and latterly Late Flyte, The Flyer, Backstage and Offside for BBC Choice Scotland. Stott moved into the world of TV acting beginning with a minor role as David Bissett in Take the High Road in 1998, as well as further guest appearances on Scottish Passport, Under the Hammer and Grow for it for Scottish Television and Grampian Television before taking a break from TV to return to radio whilst making more regular pantomime appearances throughout the late 1990s and the 2000s.

Stott returned to Radio Forth in 1998 to present Forth 2's mid-morning show until switching over to Forth 1 in 2000, he took over the Forth 1 daytime slot and remained there for 17 years, where he won The Bighearted Scotland Entertainer of the Year Award and a Sony Award Nomination.

=== 2000s ===
After an eight-year absence from TV, Stott rejoined Scottish Television (now STV) in 2006, to co-host Scotsport alongside Andy Walker, after the departure of Jim Delahunt. The programme was cancelled in May 2008, due to increasing competition from BBC Scotland's Sportscene. On Hogmanay 2007, Stott fronted a special programme, 50 Years of Scotsport and STV's Hogmanay Live from Edinburgh with Michelle Watt, which was broadcast for 20 minutes from 23:50,

In the 2010s, Stott went to present on STV's The Hour, STV2's The Fountainbridge Show and Live at Five, BBC Scotland's The Edinburgh Show and Still Game: That's Plenty and made regular contributions on STV's Scotland Tonight, SKY News and BBC News.

=== 2010s ===
In April 2017, Stott joined BBC Radio Scotland and the following year became the regular host of the Wednesday and Thursday editions of “The Afternoon Show” and presented the show for four years. He interviewed people including Billy Connolly, Dave Stewart, Jim Broadbent, Lewis Capaldi, Kenneth Branagh, Brian May, Ruby Wax, Irvine Welsh, Glenda Jackson, Elaine Paige, Luke Evans, he presented some special programmes including a two hour tribute to Sir Sean Connery after his death in 2020 and an in-depth interview with Stanley Baxter in December 2020, His other radio credits throughout his previous stint with BBC Radio Scotland include Check this, The Fred MacAuley Show, On/Off The Ball, TGIF, Soundcheck, Daddy Or Chips, Pass the Monkey, Stop the Press and Breaking the News in the 1990s, 2000s and 2010s.

Having focused on his radio career and regular pantomime appearances during the 2010s, Stott returned to a regular television role in 2021, playing Sam Spiller in the BBC Scotland soap opera River City.

In August 2022 Stott stepped down from the Afternoon Show to continue in his role as Sam Spiller in "River City" but “Grant Stott's Vinyl Collective” remains in its regular Friday night slot on BBC Radio Scotland at 6pm, Stott presented a one-off special on BBC Scotland - River City: 20 Year Celebration in September 2022.

== Philanthropy ==
Sott raised money for Leukaemia Research in memory of Moray Fotheringham, by cycling and is a patron of the Edinburgh-based charity, 'It's good 2 give'.

== Stage credits ==
=== Pantomimes ===
Stott is known for his yearly pantomimes at the King's Theatre in Edinburgh. In 2006, he starred alongside Allan Stewart and Andy Gray in a production of Cinderella. Appearances include:

- ’’Robinson Crusoe’’ as Blackheart, 2009, King’s Theatre, Edinburgh
- ’’Jack and the Beanstalk’’ as Fleshcreep, 2010, King’s Theatre, Edinburgh
- Cinderella as Gobina McPhlegm, 2011, King's Theatre, Edinburgh
- Mother Goose as Demon Vanity, 2012, King's Theatre, Edinburgh
- Peter Pan as Captain Hook, 2013, King's Theatre, Edinburgh
- Aladdin as Abanazar, 2014, King's Theatre, Edinburgh
- ’’Snow White and the Seven Dwarfs as Queen Sadista, 2015, King’s Theatre Edinburgh
- Jack and the Beanstalk as Fleshcreep, 2016, King's Theatre, Edinburgh
- Cinderella as Baroness Hibernia Hardup, 2017, King's Theatre, Edinburgh
- Beauty and the Beast as Flash Boaby, 2018, King's Theatre, Edinburgh
- Goldilocks and the Three Bears as Baron Von Winklebottom, 2019, King’s Theatre, Edinburgh
- ’’Sleeping Beauty’’ as Carabosse, 2021, King’s Theatre, Edinburgh
- Jack and the Beanstalk as Fleshcreep, 2025, Festival Theatre, Edinburgh

== Other appearances ==
Stott writes a column for the Edinburgh Evening News, and writes another weekly column in the sports section commenting about his love of Hibernian FC.

He has featured in an advertising campaign with the Edinburgh-based bus company Lothian Buses.

Stott performed a song at the Radio Forth Awards 2011 titled "That's Fife" (a cover of "That's Life") a tribute to Fife. It since has had over 200,000 views on YouTube.

He had a show on Forth 1 on Monday to Friday from 10:00 to 14:00 however, he left in January 2017.
