= The Five Thirty Show =

Scottish topical magazine show

- Genre: lifestyle, Current affairs
- Presented by: Stephen Jardine (Jan 2008 – May 2009); Debi Edward (Jan–Apr 2008); Rachel McTavish (Apr 2008 – May 2009)
- Country of origin: Scotland
- Original language: English

Production
- Camera setup: Multi-camera
- Running time: 30 minutes (including adverts)
- Production company: STV News

Original release
- Network: STV
- Release: 28 January 2008 – 23 May 2009

Related
- STV News at Six; The Hour; Live at Five

The Five Thirty Show is a Scottish topical magazine show, which began broadcasting in Northern and Central Scotland on STV on Monday 28 January 2008. The programme was aired live from STV's Pacific Quay studios in Glasgow, with live link-ups to other parts of Scotland often featuring.

In May 2009, it was revealed that the programme would be axed and replaced by a new hour-long format entitled The Hour. The last regular edition of the programme aired on Friday 15 May 2009 and concluded with co-host Rachel McTavish's departure from STV. The final live programme was followed by a week of compilation specials.

== Format ==
The show was originally intended to report on the top stories of the day from across STV's Northern and Central regions in a more relaxed style to its sister shows, Scotland Today and North Tonight (now known as STV News at Six). Within a short time of launch, the format was changed to include more lifestyle & feature items and a greater focus on entertainment stories.

== Presenters ==
The programme team since launch;

Main Presenters

- Stephen Jardine (28 January 2008 – 14 May 2009)
- Debi Edward (28 January 2008 – 25 April 2008)
- Rachel McTavish (28 April 2008 – 15 May 2009)

Roving Reporters

- Vicky Lee (relief presenter)
- Gerry McCulloch (relief presenter)
- Chris Harvey (North Scotland Correspondent)
- Natasha Stillwell

Entertainment Correspondent

- Grant Lauchlan

Weatherman

- Seán Batty

== Related shows ==
- STV News at Six
- The Hour
- Live at Five
