= Stephen Jardine =

Scottish journalist, broadcaster and presenter

Stephen Jardine (born 28 February 1963) is a Scottish journalist, broadcaster and presenter. He has worked for the BBC, Scottish Television, GMTV and Radio Tay.

== Early years ==
Born in Dumfries, Jardine is the son of the late Bill Jardine, a former chairman of Queen of the South.

== Career ==
Jardine started his career in Journalism as a reporter at Radio Tay before joining Scottish Television (now STV Central) to work on Scotland Today.

He left STV in 1994 to become GMTV's Scotland Correspondent. He then moved to Paris as Europe Correspondent, and also presented on the GMTV sofa covering stories ranging from the Death of Diana, Princess of Wales to the Cannes Film Festival.

Jardine left GMTV in December 1999 and returned to STV as host of the station's Millennium Hogmanay Show live from the centre of Edinburgh, then he moved on to presenting the afternoon talk show Room at the Top and his own evening chat show Tonight at the Top. He has also presented a number of current affairs programmes for the station, such as Seven Days, Wheel Nuts, Sunday Live election programming and the channel's coverage of The State Opening of the Scottish Parliament.

Jardine fronted feature programmes for STV including Drivetime, Summer Discovery, Wheel Nuts, Rich, Gifted & Scots and The Talent along with four live Hogmanay shows. Through February 2007, he presented a Saturday morning show on Talk 107, the now-defunct Edinburgh-based radio station between 10 am and 1 pm.

Jardine regularly presented STV's main flagship news programme Scotland Today as well as the programme's online video blog, (Not) The Real MacKay. For his presenting work with STV, Jardine received a Royal Television Society Regional Presenter of the Year award.

From Monday, 28 January 2008, Jardine, along with Debi Edward (now Scotland Correspondent for ITV News), and, later, Rachel McTavish, presented STV's daily magazine programme, The Five Thirty Show, broadcasting across the station's Northern and Central regions. The programme ended on 22 May 2009, to be replaced by The Hour, airing weekdays at 5pm from Tuesday 26 May, with Jardine and Michelle McManus hosting together. He also hosted the one-off Hogmanay special The Midnight Hour with McManus in 2010.

In May 2011, Jardine announced he had decided to leave STV after ten years with the station. He went on to launch Scotland's first dedicated food and drink media company.

Taste Communications announced that Peter Lederer, former head of VisitScotland, would be the company chairman.

After 10 years. Jardine sold the company to concentrate on his broadcasting career. He presents Mornings on BBC Radio Scotland and in February 2019, was named as the presenter of the new flagship Debate Night current affairs discussion series on BBC Scotland where politicians and public figures answer questions from members of the public. He also writes a weekly column in The Scotsman and contributes to The Times.
