= Live at Five (TV programme) =

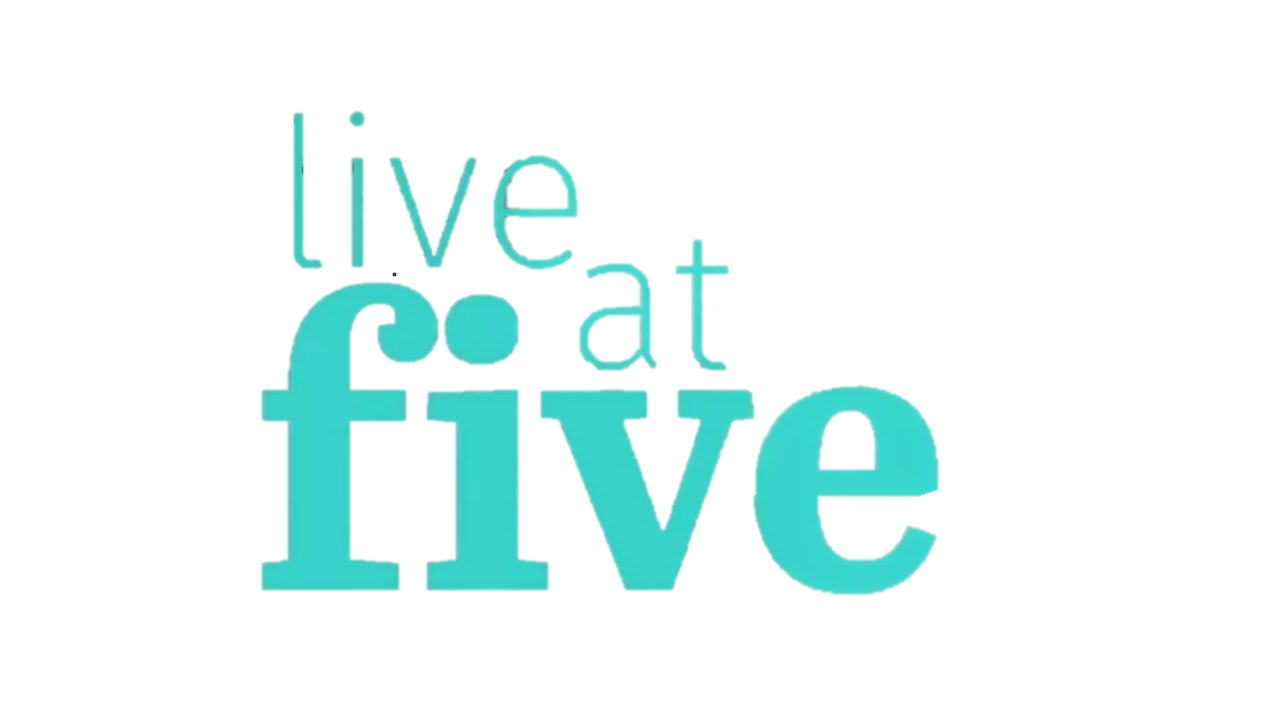
- Also known as: Live at 7.30
- Presented by: Main presenters: David Farrell; Jennifer Reoch; Other presenters: Hayley Matthews; Liam Dolan; Rachel McTavish; Ewen Cameron; Susie Cormack Bruce; Zara Janjua; Laura Boyd; Gerry Cassidy
- Country of origin: Scotland
- Original language: English

Production
- Production locations: Pacific Quay, Glasgow, Scotland
- Running time: 48–60 minutes (without advertisements)
- Production company: STV

Original release
- Network: STV2; STV Glasgow (2016–2017); STV Edinburgh (2016–2017)
- Release: 6 January 2016 – 29 June 2018

Related
- The Hour; The Late Show with Ewen Cameron; The Five Thirty Show; The Hour

Live at Five (also known as Live at 7.30) was a Scottish topical entertainment and magazine programme which originally aired on STV2 in Scotland, excluding weekends which looked at the latest on the current trends happening in Scotland from music, art and culture among others. The show was presented by David Farrell and Jennifer Reoch with other presenters such as Hayley Matthews, Liam Dolan, Rachel McTavish, Ewen Cameron, Susie Cormack Bruce or Zara Janjua being present whenever Farrell and/or Reoch were unable to present the programme. The programme airs at 5pm and during its Live at 7.30 editions, the programme aired at 7.30pm.

On 16 May 2018, it was announced that STV2 would close and all of its original programming including Live at Five would be axed in June 2018. The final episode aired on 29 June 2018 ahead of STV2's closure on 30 June 2018.

== Overview ==
Live at Five looked at the latest news, events, music, and sport from across Scotland. The programme started with two of the four presenters welcoming the audience and introduce guests to discuss the latest news from all across Scotland. Afterward, a video segment followed and then the presenters interview a couple of guests before interviewing a guest chef who cooks a meal as they discuss how they make it. After the guest chef cooked the meal, the presenters and the guests sat and eat the meal. Shortly afterward, a musical guest performed before ending the programme.

=== Teatime Trivia ===
The programme also contained a short segment called Teatime Trivia which occurred before and after advertisements during the programme where the presenters asked general knowledge questions. The Teatime Trivia segment was scrapped in April 2018.

== Editions ==
=== Live at Five ===
Live at Five originally aired on STV Glasgow and STV Edinburgh from 2016 until 2017 where the two channels were merged and relaunched as STV2. Live at Five was the first programme to air on STV2 and expanded to 48–60 minutes from the original 30 minutes and introduced a new logo and graphics as part of Live at Five's rebrand on STV2. Live at Five resumed broadcasting on 22 January 2018 after the time slot for STV2 changed once more.

==== Best of Live at Five ====
Best of Live at Five is a compilation show of the best bits aired on Live at Five and usually airs whenever live episodes are unable to be recorded due to either conflict schedules or whenever presenters are unable to present the show – for instance during the 2018 Great Britain and Ireland cold wave, some of the presenters from the show could not travel to the STV studios in Glasgow as they lived in other parts of Scotland and because of the severity of the weather, they could not travel which resulted in a compilation show being broadcast over two days during the cold wave.

=== Live at 7.30 ===
In 2018, Live at 7.30 was launched alongside Live at Five at the start of the year with the time slot being moved from 5:00 pm to 7.30 pm from the start of January until 19 January 2018. In addition, E! on STV which was originally a programme on STV2 moved as a segment on the Live at 7.30 programme with Laura Boyd presenting as part of the transition to Live at 7.30. The Live at Five time slot was replaced by Peter & Roughie's Football Show during that period of time.

== Presenters ==
=== Main presenters ===
- David Farrell (2016–2018)
- Jennifer Reoch (2016–2018)

=== Other presenters ===
- Hayley Matthews (2016–2017)
- George Ward (2016–2018)
- Liam Dolan (2016–2017)
- Rachel McTavish (2016–2017)
- Ewen Cameron (2016–2018)
- Susie Cormack Bruce (2016–2018)
- Grant Stott (2017)
- Zara Janjua (2017–2018)
- Laura Boyd (2016–2018; also E! on STV presenter)
- Gerry Cassidy (2016–2018; also E! on STV presenter)

== Gallery ==
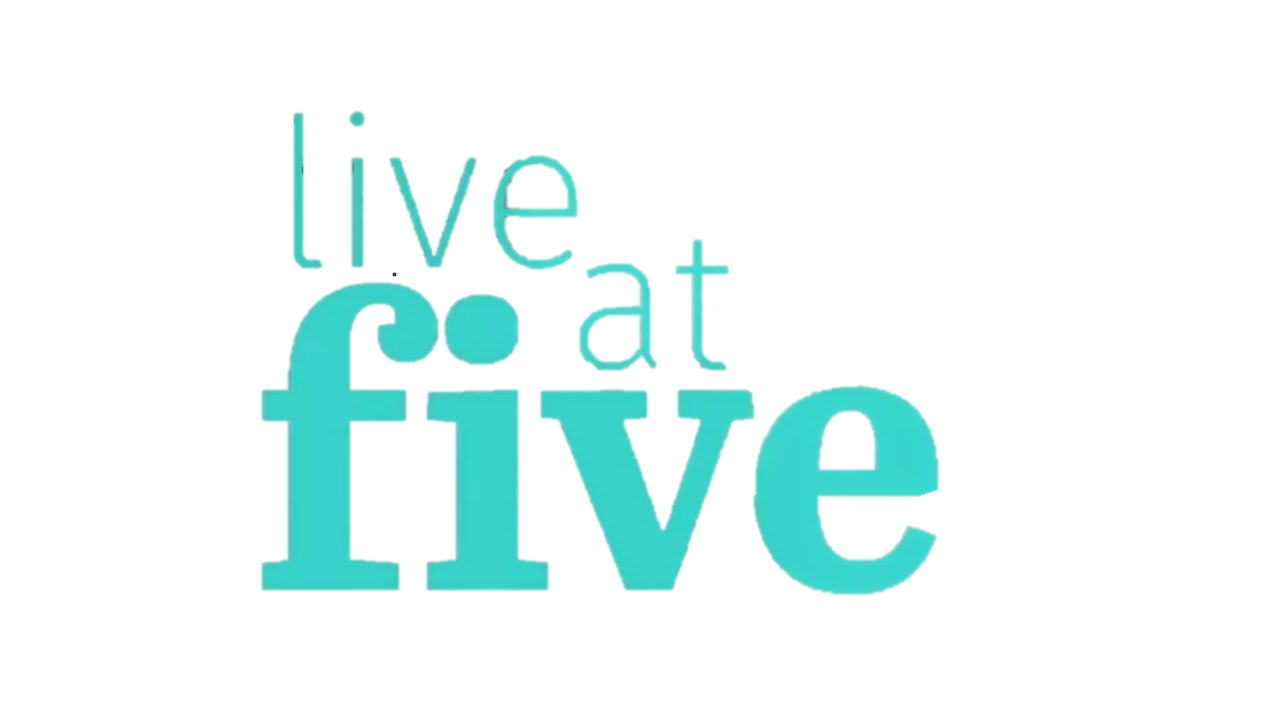
Live at Five logo

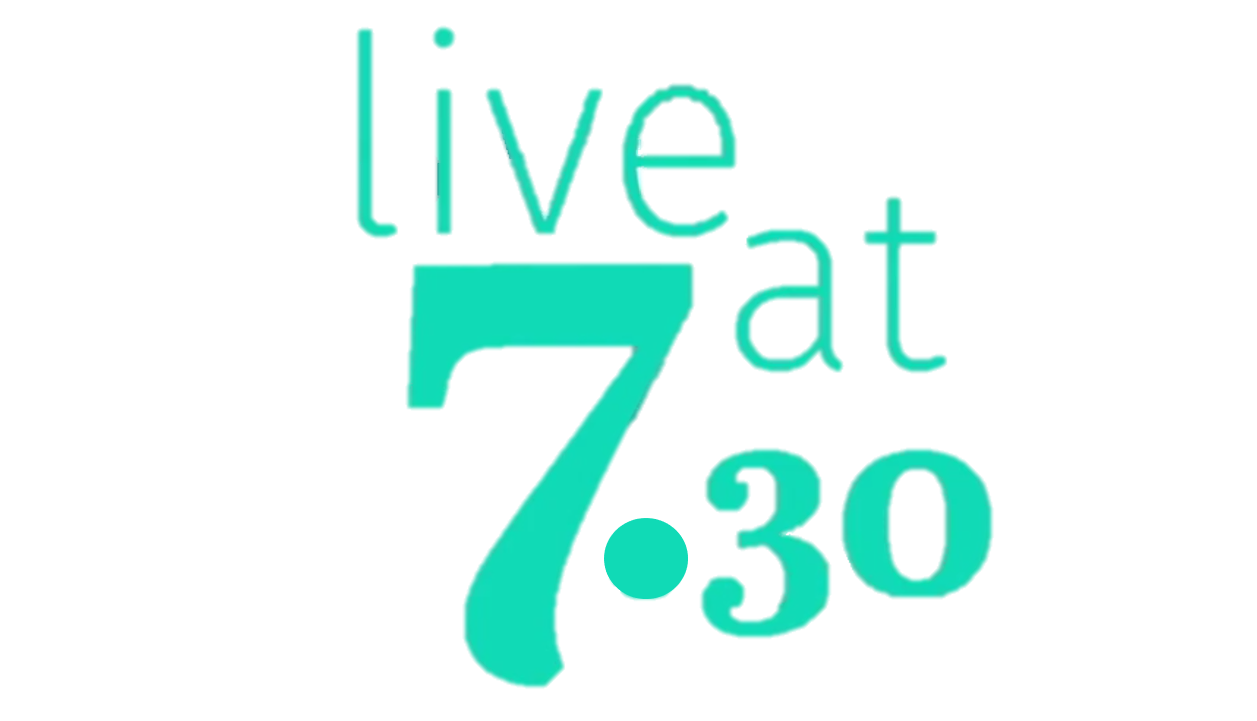
Live at 7.30 logo

== Related shows ==
- The Late Show with Ewen Cameron
- The Five Thirty Show
- The Hour

Preceded by N/A	RTS Scotland Awards; Daytime Programme; 2018	Succeeded by incumbent
