= Danniella Westbrook =

English actress and television personality (born 1973/1974)

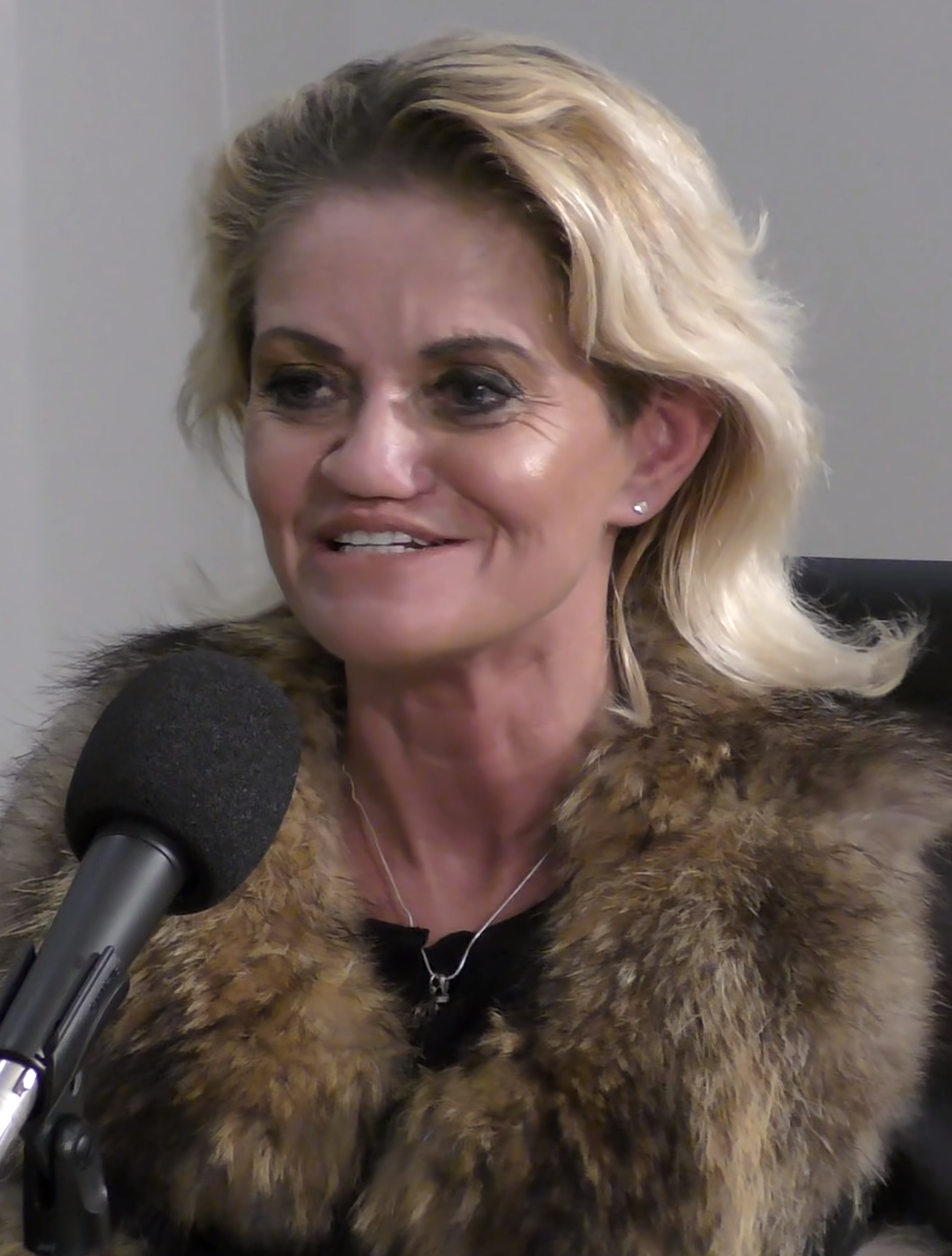
- Westbrook in 2021
- Born: 5 November 1973 (age 53); Walthamstow, London, England
- Occupations: Actress; television personality
- Years active: 1981–2006, 2009–2022
- Television: EastEnders; I'm a Celebrity...Get Me Out of Here! Dancing on Ice; Hollyoaks; Celebrity Big Brother
- Spouses: Ben Morgan (m. 1998; div. 1999) Kevin Jenkins (m. 2001; div. 2014)
- Partner(s): Brian Harvey (1991–1995); Robert Fernandez (1995–1997); George Arnold (2015–2016)
- Children: 2

Danniella Westbrook (born 5 November 1973) is an English actress and television personality. She is best known for playing Sam Mitchell in the BBC soap opera EastEnders. Westbrook has also presented various television shows and was a contestant on the ITV show I'm a Celebrity...Get Me Out of Here! in 2003. She competed in the fifth series of Dancing on Ice in 2010, with US Pairs Skater Matthew Gonzalez, and finished fourth in the competition. In 2013, Westbrook appeared in the soap opera Hollyoaks as Trudy Ryan. In 2016, she took part in the seventeenth series of the reality show Celebrity Big Brother, in which she reached the final and finished in fifth place.

Westbrook had a much publicised cocaine addiction throughout the 1990s and early 2000s, which caused the complete erosion of her nasal septum. She has stated she began taking drugs at the age of 14 after suffering from child abuse. During her adult addiction to cocaine she was kidnapped and gang-raped by drug dealers. In 2016, she was sectioned by doctors after a suicide attempt. She has released two autobiographies, The Other Side of Nowhere (2006) and Faith, Hope and Clarity (2013).

== Early life ==
Westbrook was born on 5 November 1973 in Walthamstow, London, and grew up in Loughton, Essex. Her father Andy was a cab driver, and later a carpet contractor, while her mother, Sue, was a shop assistant. Westbrook has a younger brother, Jay, and an elder half-brother, Justin, from her father's previous marriage. She has said that she suffered child abuse from the age of seven.

As a child, she had a keen interest in horse riding, but said that she always had aspirations to be famous. She started modelling at the age of seven and then progressed to acting. She joined the Sylvia Young Theatre School when she was eight, attending Saturday classes. Throughout the early stages of her career, Westbrook attended a local state primary school, but she was bullied because of her television appearances, and after one bully cut off her hair, Westbrook's parents removed her from the school. She was sent to a local private school, until, at the age of 12, her parents allowed her to attend Sylvia Young Theatre School as a full-time student, where Denise Van Outen, Dani Behr and her future EastEnders co-stars, Nicola Stapleton and Samantha Janus, were among her contemporaries.

== Career ==
=== Early career ===
Westbrook started off modelling at the age of seven for the supermarket, Asda. She took part in the launch of Next's children's fashionware, became the face of high street store Tammy Girl, took part in a Weetabix campaign and featured in advertisements for Opel cars and Coca-Cola. Later, she did modelling, alongside her younger brother Jay. She moved into acting, appearing as a child thief in Melvyn Bragg's London Programme and the West End production of Joseph and the Amazing Technicolor Dreamcoat. She appeared in the music video for the song "The Invisible Man" by Queen and had a minor role in Grange Hill. At the age of eleven, she appeared as an extra in BBC soap opera EastEnders, roller skating across the soap's setting of Albert Square. At the time, her local paper published her picture with the punchline "who knows, one day she may be the show's star!".

=== EastEnders ===
At the age of 16, Westbrook was put forward for a much bigger role in EastEnders, Sam Mitchell (the younger sister of Phil and Grant). Her audition was successful, and her first appearance on EastEnders was aired in July 1990. Despite featuring in some prominent storylines, Westbrook decided to leave the soap in 1993 to take on another role. In 1995, the producers at EastEnders asked her back to the soap a second time. However, Westbrook was regularly using cocaine and it began to affect her work. Due to her off-screen difficulties and her poor and tardy attendance on set, the producers of EastEnders terminated her contract and she was written out of the soap again in 1996.

In 1999, EastEnders' producers decided to reintroduce the character of Sam Mitchell. Although they initially considered recasting the role with another actress, and despite all her past problems, they decided to give Westbrook another chance, and she was asked back for a third time. During her time away, her heavy use of cocaine had completely eroded her nasal septum. To hide this from the viewers, she was only filmed in ways that would keep her septum hidden from view. However, Westbrook's drug taking had not ended, and in 2000, she was asked to leave EastEnders again. In 2001, the character of Sam Mitchell was reintroduced, but due to Westbrook's personal issues, producers decided to recast. Kim Medcalf became the second actress to play Sam Mitchell, appearing from 29 January 2002 until 17 November 2005; from 18 April 2022 until 18 January 2024; and again from 4 December 2025 to 26 May 2026.

In April 2009, the media confirmed that EastEnders bosses were reintroducing the character of Sam, and that Westbrook would be reprising the role, not Medcalf. Westbrook returned to screens in September 2009 for two temporary stints, departing once again on 7 January and 21 September 2010. Westbrook again reprised the role of Sam for four episodes airing between 30 June and 8 July 2016. When producers decided to reintroduce the character of Sam in 2022, they opted to bring Medcalf back and not Westbrook.

=== Other work ===
A week after her initial exit from EastEnders, in 1993, Westbrook was cast in the part of Dawn in the ITV show Frank Stubbs Promotes, which had a second series in 1994. She also played a part in Dave Stewart's short film directorial debut, Entertaining Mr. Simpson. The film was shown at various film festivals around the world, including Cannes.

In 2003, Westbrook was a contestant in the second series of British ITV reality television show I'm a Celebrity...Get Me Out of Here!. Despite being a popular candidate for winning, she found the environment traumatic, saying that she missed her children and wasn't psychologically prepared for the hardship of the jungle life. She quit the show after nine days, before being voted off.

In 2006, Westbrook appeared on a reality TV special of The Weakest Link where she lost in the head-to-head final round. She won £5,025 after Martin Offiah decided to split the winnings, which were donated to charity.

Westbrook was reportedly offered the role of Natalie Buxton in the ITV prison series Bad Girls, but she declined because of her nose rebuilding operation. Dannielle Brent went on to play Natalie Buxton. Westbrook also turned down a small role in Footballers Wives and the role of Suzie Samson in ITV soap opera Crossroads. Emma Noble went on to play Suzie Samson.

Westbrook, who has admitted to having breast enhancements, co-presented Cosmetic Surgery Live alongside Vanessa Feltz. Westbrook has also presented and starred in a series of fitness DVDs. She has appeared in the reality series I'm Famous and Frightened! and Most Haunted, as well as the television comedy sketch show Bo' Selecta. In addition, she presented Derek Acorah's Ghost Towns with Derek Acorah on LIVINGtv.

Westbrook has featured in several documentaries, including an interview with British journalist Martin Bashir for the Tonight with Trevor McDonald show and Danniella Westbrook: My Nose and Me for Channel 4. In April 2006, Westbrook released an autobiography entitled The Other Side of Nowhere, which gives a depiction of her struggles with cocaine.

Westbrook competed in the fifth series of Dancing on Ice and was partnered by newcomer professional Matthew Gonzalez in 2010. She was eliminated from the show in the semi-finals, placing fourth overall. In 2013, she appeared in Channel 4 teen soap opera Hollyoaks as an instalment of a storyline, which saw Westbrook's character Trudy Ryan hire Jacqui McQueen (Claire Cooper) and Theresa McQueen (Jorgie Porter). In 2014, she appeared in the Vigilante Film 'Mob Handed'. She was due to reprise her role as Trudy on Hollyoaks in 2015, however this was cancelled with a representative from Hollyoaks claiming that she "breached her contract".

On 5 January 2016, she entered the Celebrity Big Brother house to take part in the seventeenth series. On 5 February, Westbrook reached the final and finished in fifth place. Since her appearance on Celebrity Big Brother she has appeared on Loose Women and This Morning, followed by a brief return to EastEnders.

Westbrook has not performed for TV or film since mid-2016. In December of that year, she began DJing. In February 2019, Westbrook embarked on a career as a motivational speaker, speaking to international crowds at several shows entitled Yes You Can – Inspired to Achieve at London's Earl's Court.

In October 2022, it was reported that Westbrook would star in a West End of London adult pantomime, titled Sinderfella. She played The Fairy Godmother for one-night only, on 12 December 2022, at The Prince of Wales Pub on Drury Lane.

== Personal life ==
=== Drug addiction ===
Westbrook's struggle with cocaine addiction has been widely documented in the British press and media. She said that she first tried the drug at the age of 14, stating that she turned to drugs after suffering from child abuse. After winning her role in EastEnders at the age of 16, Westbrook was a regular on the London club scene, and her cocaine usage escalated.

She has commented: "I was always in clubs and everyone was doing coke and it was glamorous – except obviously, it wasn't at all. I was just very young, very stupid and very easily led...I think there should be someone at EastEnders to say to young people when they come in, 'Look, your life is about to change, you're going to be invited places, and you'll be offered drugs.' Someone who can tell them what sort of people are about, and what sort of papers, and how quickly what you've worked for all those years can be gone." Westbrook estimated in 2006 that she had spent over £250,000 on drugs, used five grams of cocaine every day throughout her first pregnancy, and stated that during her lowest ebb she attempted suicide.

In May 2000, Westbrook was photographed at the British Soap Awards, where an image of her missing columella (the skin at the end of the septum which separates the nostrils) was given to a series of tabloid newspapers, unveiling her secret and highlighting her improper drug use. Westbrook was checked into rehab and, six months later, she appeared on the Channel 4 programme The Priory with the claim that she was clean and had been free from drugs for months. However, hosts Jamie Theakston and Zoë Ball struggled to get coherent answers from Westbrook, who appeared to be under the influence of drugs despite her claims of abstinence.

Reflecting back on the event two years later in 2002, Westbrook commented: "I said I was clean, but it was obvious I wasn't. I looked about 50, and my voice was shaky. I should never have been allowed on. They wanted to laugh at me, rip me apart. I despise that sort of thing, but it did me the world of good because watching it I realised, 'I'm so ill.' When it came to the crunch I thought, 'Hang on. I don't want to die.'" She re-entered rehab to try to end her drug habit. Westbrook has since undergone reconstructive surgery on her nose, to replace her eroded septum and columella.

In June 2013, Westbrook said in an interview that she had been kidnapped and gang-raped by drug dealers during the period when she was addicted to cocaine. In 2016, she was sectioned by doctors after a suicide attempt.

In 2019, Westbrook appeared on The Jeremy Kyle Show to talk about her continued drug use, and it was arranged for her to enter drug rehabilitation. Westbrook said on Channel 5's Jeremy Vine that Kyle's intervention had saved her life.

=== Relationships and family ===
During the 1990s, Westbrook began dating East 17 lead singer Brian Harvey from 1991 to 1995. Westbrook then dated Robert Fernandez. Their son was born 23 November 1996.

In 1998, Westbrook was involved in a car accident which left her with severe facial injuries, including a dislocated eye. She was flung through the car windscreen but survived, and after corrective surgery had no long-term or major disfigurement. Fernandez was driving the car, and it has been reported that he was travelling at 85 miles per hour (137 km/h).

After splitting with Fernandez, Westbrook married van driver Ben Morgan in 1998 after knowing him for eight weeks. The couple moved to Australia, but the marriage ended in divorce nine months later.

Westbrook married businessman Kevin Jenkins on 27 December 2001, almost four months after the birth of their daughter on 5 September that year. After appearing on I'm a Celebrity... Get Me Out of Here! in 2003, Westbrook said that she no longer wanted to be a 'celebrity', commenting, "I made a pact with Kevin [that] I would do no more TV work that would take me away from home." In 2014, the couple divorced. They had one daughter: Jodie B. Jenkins.

=== Health ===
In May 2017, Westbrook discussed her mental health on the panel series Loose Women, saying: "I have borderline personality disorder, I'm bipolar, [paranoid] schizophrenia, I've got lots of different things".

In August 2018, Westbrook underwent treatment for womb cancer after the disease was misdiagnosed. A year later, she was given the all-clear.

In May 2022, she developed sepsis due to an undisclosed cause and was admitted to an Intensive Care Unit. She recovered completely following prompt treatment.

== Filmography ==
=== Film ===
Year	Title	Role	Notes
2016	Essex Vendetta	Michelle	
2016	Mob Handed	The Mother	

=== Television ===
Year	Title	Role	Notes
1990–1993, 1995–1996, 1999–2000, 2009–2010, 2016	EastEnders	Sam Mitchell	325 episodes
1992	Top of the Pops	Guest Host	Episode: "Christmas 1992"
1993–1994	Frank Stubbs Promotes	Dawn Dillon	Main role
2003	I'm a Celebrity...Get Me Out of Here!	Herself	Contestant
2003	Most Haunted	Herself	1 episode
2003	Bo’ Selecta!	Herself	Guest Role (1 Episode)
2005–2006	Derek Acorah's Ghost Towns	Herself	Presenter
2006	The Weakest Link	Herself	Contestant
2009	EastEnders Revealed	Herself	Interviewee
2010	EastEnders: E20	Sam Mitchell	2 episodes (series 1-2)
2010	Dancing on Ice	Herself	Contestant (4th place)
2013	Hollyoaks	Trudy Ryan	15 episodes
2016	Celebrity Big Brother	Herself	36 episodes
2019	The Jeremy Kyle Show	Herself	Episode: "Pilot"

=== Music video ===
Year	Song	Artist	Role
1989	"The Invisible Man"	Queen	The Sister

== Theatre ==
Year	Title	Role	Notes
1991	Joseph and the Amazing Technicolor Dreamcoat	Children’s Choir	London Palladium, London
1991–1992	Robin Hood	Robin Hood	Forum Theatre, Hatfield
1993–1994	Peter Pan	Wendy Darling	Princess Theatre, Torquay
1994–1995	Babes in the Wood	The Princess	Civic Hall, Guildford
1997–1998	Beauty and the Beast	Princess Belle	Marlowe Theatre, Canterbury
2012–2013	Dick Whittington	Fairy Godmother	York Barbican
2013–2014	Sleeping Beauty	Wicked Queen	Kings Theatre, Portsmouth
2022	Sinderfella	Fairy Godmother	The Prince of Wales Pub, Drury Lane

== See also ==
- List of Celebrity Big Brother (British TV series) housemates
- List of Dancing on Ice contestants
- List of I'm a Celebrity...Get Me Out of Here! (British TV series) contestants
