= Clyde Docks Preservation Initiative =

Clyde Docks Preservation Initiative (CDPI) is a research, networking and advocacy social enterprise concerned with the protection and promotion of maritime heritage along the River and Firth of Clyde in the West of Scotland. The organisation works in partnership with diverse organisations to raise awareness of the issues impacting on the maritime heritage of the region.

CDPI looks at heritage in a broader context than history and museums, which are only a part of the picture. Heritage is a legacy from past traditions as well as what we create now and pass on to future generations. This means looking at issues of contemporary and emergent culture, activity, innovation, new technology and sustainable development.

The organisation was set up in 2015, initially as a lead body to take forward advocacy for the derelict A-listed Govan Graving Docks in Glasgow to become a maritime heritage park. In 2016 CDPI set up the Govan Docks Regeneration Trust charity to take forward proposals for the future of the Govan dry docks with community stakeholders. Since then the organisation has expanded to address the broader picture of maritime heritage, tourism and insdustry on the Clyde and in doing so has been involved in numerous academic collaborations - Including with the University of the West of Scotland and Glasgow Caledonian University.

In 2021 CDPI set up the Clyde.Scot web platform. The website is creating content raising the profile of the River and Firth of Clyde as a maritime region. It covers Central Glasgow to the Ayrshire and Kintyre coasts, the Clyde islands and sea lochs. It is a celebration of the Clyde, the history of the river; its biodiversity; its communities and activities that take place through organisations, groups and the local business sector. While the website has a core maritime theme, it is so much more than that.
