= Postcode Challenge =

Scottish game show

- Genre: Game show
- Presented by: Carol Smillie (2007–2009); Angus Purden (2010–2011)
- Country of origin: Scotland
- Original language: English
- No. of series: 2

Production
- Production location: BBC Pacific Quay
- Running time: 30 minutes (inc. adverts)
- Production company: SMG Productions

Original release
- Network: STV
- Release: 12 November 2007 – 2011

Postcode Challenge is a Scottish television game show presented originally by Carol Smillie and then by Angus Purden, produced by STV Studios for broadcast on STV.

== Format ==
Each team is made up of six individuals from the same postcode, with one the designated team captain. Whilst the team captain interacts with the presenter, the five participating neighbours lend support and answer questions by way of an electronic keypad.

There are three rounds in Postcode Challenge in total, with two knock-out rounds before the big cash final. In round one, two teams will go out. In round three, the two remaining teams go head to head, with the team captains taking each other on to see which will go through to the final round. But the neighbours play an important part too, as the size of the final cash prize depends on the answers they give in round three.

At the end of the show, one lucky team has the chance to win up to £25,000 in cash in the cash ladder final. Half the money goes to the team captain, and the rest of it is divided equally between the other five team members.

The format changed for the Angus Purden era, with teams of four and each player having to pull their weight on the 90-second general knowledge round. The questions stick with each player till they get one right and there are minus points for wrong answers.

A team of health professionals from Edinburgh, playing as EH5 3EL, started off the general knowledge round with eight points and ended up on zero after their team captain got all twelve questions wrong and no one else got a chance to answer.

A team from nearby St Serfs tennis club, playing as EH5 3AP, set a record score of 40. Team captain Brian Pendreigh had previously been a winner on Mastermind. The others were Mark Gaffney, Ewen Pendreigh and Max Thomson. The losers' score of 25 would have won virtually any other programme.
