= Pacific Quay =

Area south of the River Clyde in Glasgow, Scotland

Coordinates: 55°51′28″N 4°17′34″W

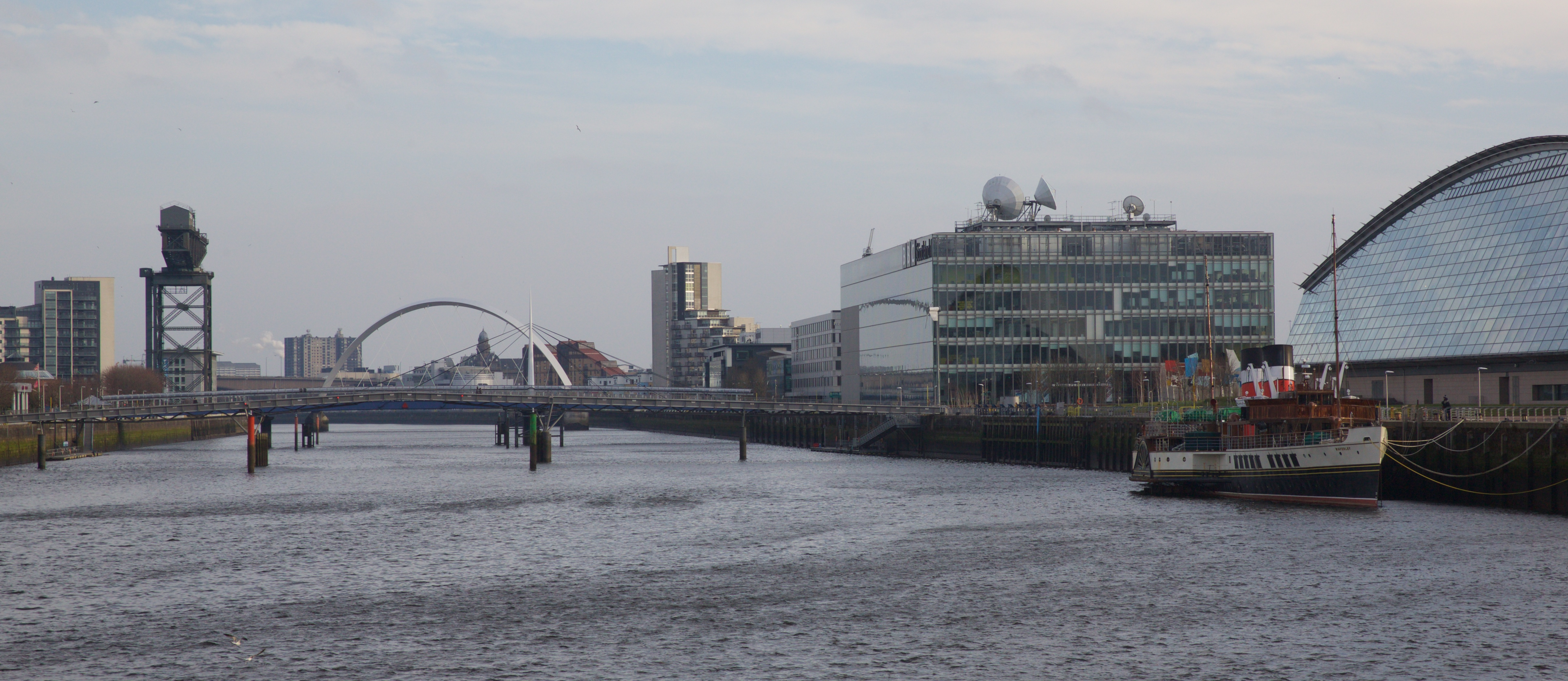
Pacific Quay to the right of the River Clyde, showing the HQ of BBC Scotland, the Glasgow Science Centre and new housing developments

Pacific Quay is an area south of the River Clyde in Glasgow, Scotland. It is located at the former Plantation Quay and Princes' Dock Basin. The Princes' Dock Basin was the largest on the River Clyde when it was opened by the Clyde Navigation Trust in 1900. It ceased to be used as a commercial dock by the Clyde Port Authority in the 1970s as the volume of shipping using the Upper Clyde declined with the onset of containerization. The site was later used for the Glasgow Garden Festival in 1988. The former electric generating station and pumping house, "Four Winds" which was used to pump water between the rotundas and generate power for the electric cranes still stands and is now home to a consultant engineers and radio station. The name 'Pacific Quay' has no historical significance, as it was created simply as a marketing enterprise following the land being reclaimed for commercial use after the Garden Festival closure. It did not reflect the site as a departure point for ships bound for the Pacific Rim.

== Recent developments ==
Today Pacific Quay includes:

- Glasgow Science Centre complex, including Glasgow Tower
- BBC Pacific Quay, BBC Scotland headquarters and studios.
- STV Group, headquarters and studios for the Scottish broadcaster.
- Capital Scotland, radio station.
- Buro Happold, consultant engineers.
- Digital Design Studio, research and commercial centre of Glasgow School of Art

== Govan Graving Docks ==
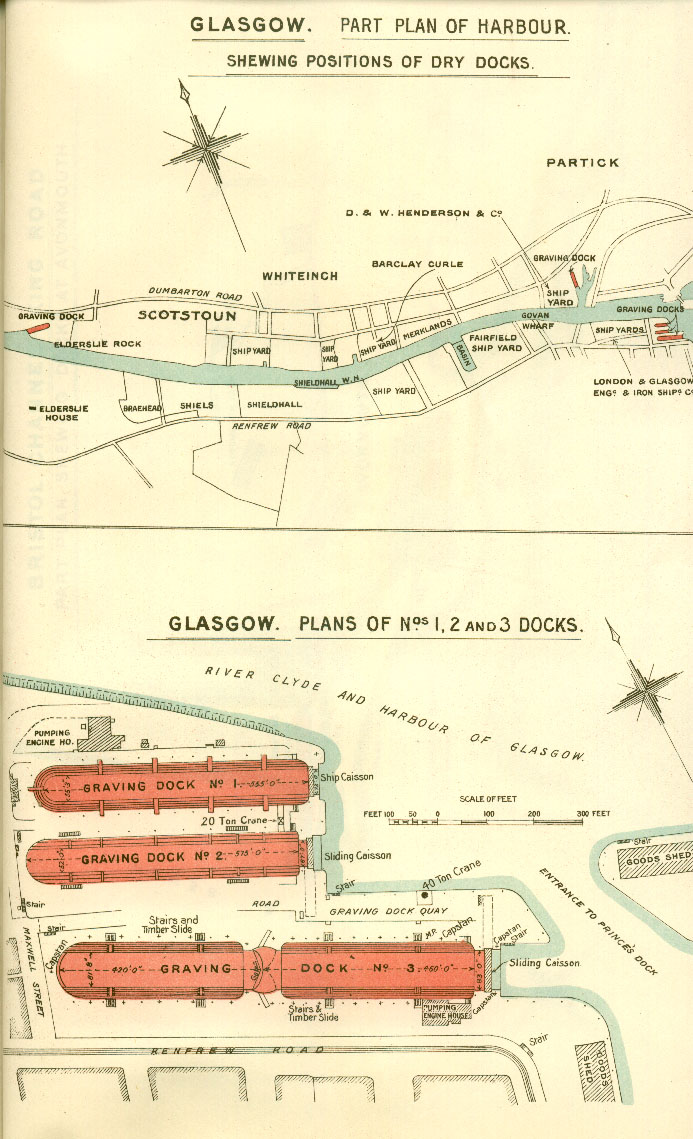
Admiralty plan of the Govan Graving Docks from 1909.

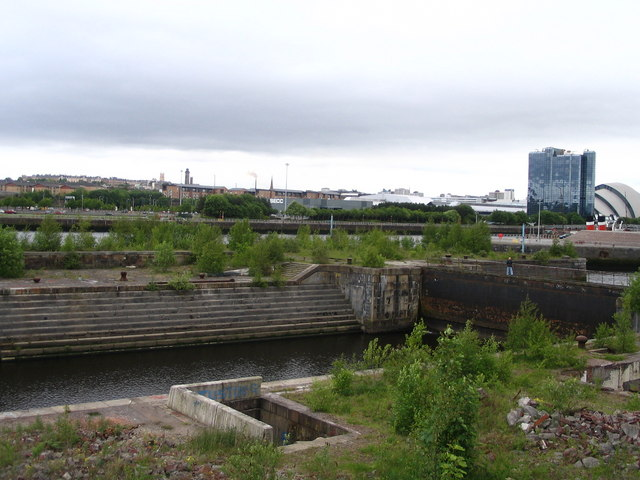
The derelict Govan Graving Docks complex.

To the immediate west of Pacific Quay lies the former Govan Graving Docks. The Clyde Navigation Trust (now Clydeport) opened its first Graving Dock at Govan in 1875 and a second in 1886. The third and largest, at 880 ft in length, was opened in 1898. The facility was operated by the Clyde Navigation Trust until 1967, when it was taken over by Alexander Stephen and Sons as a ship repair yard, which lasted until 1976. This was subsequently taken over by Clyde Dock Engineering Ltd in 1977 and continued to operate before eventually closing in 1987. Despite forming the proposed site for a new Clyde Ship Trust Maritime Museum, site for the preservation of the City of Adelaide and later Glasgow's failed bid to host the Royal Yacht Britannia as a museum ship in the late 1990s, the site has been derelict for 28 years in the hands of various connected property development companies. Residential regeneration schemes have been repeatedly put forward for the site over the years and then shelved.

Planning permission for a residential and commercial development of the docks was refused by Glasgow District Council in 1990.

In 2002-2003 Glasgow City Council was unsuccessful in a bid for European Regional Development Fund (ERDF) funding from the Strathclyde European Partnership to subsidise the cost of a proposed major private sector development of the docks for private housing, a hotel and offices.

There is currently a campaign for the Graving Docks and the only remaining pump house building to be restored to create a maritime heritage park and the petition has so far attracted more than 8,300 signatures. The Clyde Docks Preservation Initiative Limited was incorporated as a non-profit company in June 2015 to establish a lead organisation in efforts to protect the future of Govan Graving Docks (and potentially other maritime sites on the Clyde) as a maritime heritage asset. Early in 2016 the organisation ran an online consultation survey on the future of the Govan dry dock site in which 92% of respondents expressed opposition to housing development.

A detailed report produced by the Clyde Docks Preservation Initiative in November 2016 clearly demonstrates that proposals to redevelop the Govan Graving Docks for primarily housing are not viable on grounds of desirability/popularity, financial viability, technical viability, industrial/maritime heritage concerns and the A-listed status of the site.

Campaigners have called for a compulsory purchase order (CPO) of the Govan graving docks site.

== See also ==
- Clyde Waterfront Regeneration
- Media Village Scotland
