= Timeline of Scottish Television =

This is a timeline of the history of the British broadcaster Scottish Television (now known as STV Central). It provides the ITV network service for Central Scotland.

The timeline also includes events for the merged STV channel after STV began covering Northern Scotland in 2006.

== 1950s ==
- 1952
  - 14 March – Television becomes available in Scotland for the first time following the switching on of the BBC service on VHF ch3 from the Kirk o'Shotts transmitting station.
- 1957
  - 31 August – At 5:30 pm, Scottish Television starts broadcasting on VHF ch10 from the newly built transmitter at Black Hill, close to the BBC's mast at Kirk o'Shotts and becomes the first ITV company to broadcast seven days a week.
  - 18 September – Scottish launches a sports programme called Sports Desk which was soon renamed Scotsport. The programme would be broadcast for the next fifty years.
- 1958
  - No events.
- 1959
  - No events.

== 1960s ==
- 1960
  - No events.
- 1961
  - No events.
- 1962
  - May – Scottish Television's weekly listings magazine is renamed from TV Guide to The Viewer.
- 1963
  - No events.
- 1964
  - Scottish is given a three-year extension to its licence. This is later extended by a further year.
  - 15 August – Scottish launches Scotsport Results to provide Scottish viewers with a round-up of the day's Scottish football. It is broadcast on Saturday teatimes at around 5pm during the football season.
- 1965
  - The chairman of the Independent Television Authority Charles Hill pays a visit to STV's Glasgow studios during which he observed an edition of the popular daytime entertainment show The One O'Clock Gang. He was so appalled by it, he personally axed the programme with the words My God, how long have you been getting away with this?. Consequently, Scottish no longer broadcasts programming at lunchtime.
  - September – The final edition of Scottish TV's listings magazine The Viewer is published. Subsequently, Scottish's listings are carried in the magazine TVTimes.
- 1966
  - Scottish Television is listed on the London Stock Exchange.
- 1967
  - Scottish Television retains its franchise, despite strong competition from a consortium led by the future BBC Director General Alasdair Milne and strong indications that the company would lose its franchise. Lord Thomson is forced by the ITA to reduce his stake in the station from 80% to 25%, effectively ending the company's standing as a subsidiary of the Thomson Group.
- 1968
  - August – A technicians strike forces ITV off the air for several weeks although management manage to launch a temporary ITV Emergency National Service with no regional variations.
  - 30 August - A television relay of Black Hill opens for Rothesay on VHF ch8.
  - 13 December - a further relay station opens at Rosneath, improving reception of Scottish Television for viewers in Dunoon and the Firth of Clyde areas, on VHF ch13.
- 1969
  - 31 January - a third and final VHF relay broadcasting Scottish on ch12 opens at Lethahill, improving reception in the Girvan and Ayr areas.
  - October – Scottish starts producing programmes in colour and marks the occasion by opening new secondary studios at the Gateway Theatre in Edinburgh.
  - November – A major fire badly damages Scottish's Glasgow studios.
  - 13 December – Scottish starts broadcasting in colour, using the 625 lines PAL system from the Black Hill transmitter on ch43.

== 1970s ==
- 1970
  - Scottish launches a brand new ‘’STV’’ logo with the words Scottish Television displayed below the actual logo.
- 1971
  - 27 September - a second high-power UHF transmitter opens broadcasting Scottish Television from Craigkelly on UHF ch24. The tower, at Burntisland, improves Colour television for much of Edinburgh and parts of Fife.
- 1972
  - Scottish begins the construction of its new purpose-built complex in Glasgow, at Cowcaddens.
  - 11 September – Scotland Today is launched, although the programme is only broadcast for ten months each year. Magazine programmes are shown during the summer break.
  - 16 October – Following a law change which removed all restrictions on broadcasting hours, ITV is able to launch an afternoon service.
  - 1 December - Colour television reception is improved south-west of Glasgow with the opening of the Darvel UHF transmitter on ch23.
- 1973
  - No events.
- 1974
  - The 1974 franchise round sees no changes in ITV's contractors as it is felt that the huge cost in switching to colour television would have made the companies unable to compete against rivals in a franchise battle.
  - 12 December – The official opening of Scottish Television's new studios by Princess Alexandra takes place.
- 1975
  - 23 May-9 June – A strike over the payments agreed before the government-imposed pay freeze came into force results in many ITV companies being unable to broadcast. All of the companies affected by the strike were fully back on air by the end of May, apart from at Scottish where the dispute dragged on for a further fortnight.
- 1976
  - 1 April – Following ITV wanting to have a Scottish soap for its daytime line-up, Scottish launches Garnock Way.
  - 11 June - The Torosay transmitter broadcasting on UHF ch25 opens, extending Scottish TV in colour to the Oban and Fort William areas.
- 1977
  - No events.
- 1978
  - Scotland Today’s annual summer break is scrapped and consequently the programme is now on air all year round.
  - 7 October – Following a 21.8% increase in profits for the first six months of 1978, Scottish announces an increase in local programming.
- 1979
  - 10 August – The ten week ITV strike forces Scottish Television off the air. The strike ends on 24 October.
  - Scottish ends production of soap opera Garnock Way due to a lack of interest from the English companies - only one English region (Southern Television) had ever broadcast the show, and only did so for just over one year.

== 1980s ==
- 1980
  - 19 February – The first edition of soap-opera Take the High Road is broadcast. Unlike predecessor Garnock Way, the new soap was carried by all ITV regions and they continued to do so until the late 1990s.
- 1981
  - October – Scottish Television becomes the first ITV station to launch a regional Oracle teletext service, containing over 60 pages of local news, sport and information.
- 1982
  - No events.
- 1983
  - 1 February – ITV's breakfast television service TV-am launches. It is a UK-wide service and therefore contains no Scottish-specific content. Consequently, Scottish's broadcast day now begins at 9:25 am.
- 1984
  - 8 October – Scotland Today is relaunched as a features-led magazine format with the news relegated to brief summaries before and after the programme.
- 1985
  - 4 January – Scottish Television's last day of transmission using the 405-lines system.
  - 31 August – Scottish launches a new computer-generated ident and revives the Scottish Television branding.
- 1986
  - 20 October – Following considerable criticism, including from the Independent Broadcasting Authority, the 1984 changes to Scotland Today are reversed and the programme once again becomes a news bulletin with the feature elements transferred to a new lunchtime programme called Live at One Thirty.
- 1987
  - 7 September – Following the transfer of ITV Schools to Channel 4, ITV provides a full morning programme schedule, with advertising, for the first time. The new service includes regular five-minute national and regional news bulletins.
- 1988
  - 13 February –
    - Scottish launches 24-hour broadcasting.
    - Scottish abandons in-vision continuity, apart from the overnight hours.
- 1989
  - 1 September – ITV introduces its first official logo as part of an attempt to unify the network under one image whilst retaining regional identity. Scottish chooses not to fully adopt the ident although it does use it in conjunction with its own identity, which Scottish had refreshed earlier in 1989.

== 1990s ==
- 1990
  - No events.
- 1991
  - October – Scottish rebrands its overnight service as Scottish Night Time, and removes the overnight in-vision continuity.
  - 16 October –
    - Scottish retains its licence to broadcast. It bids a nominal amount (£2,000 a year, plus 2% of their annual advertising revenue) for the licence due to there being no other applicants.
    - Scottish is one of the backers of GMTV which is awarded the breakfast television contract.
  - Scottish TV's production arm is placed into a separate company, Scottish Television Enterprises.
- 1992
  - No events.
- 1993
  - 1 January – Scottish Television launches new idents and presentation.
  - January – Scottish launches a 30-minute lunchtime edition of Scotland Today.
  - May – Scotsport Results is axed after almost 30 years on air.
- 1994
  - Mirror Group buys a 20% stake of Scottish Television.
- 1995
  - September – Flextech sells its 20% stake in HTV to Scottish Television.
- 1996
  - June – Scottish launches a new political programme called Platform.
  - July – Scottish renames itself Scottish Media Group (SMG), doing so to reflect its expansion into other aspects of the media following the acquisition of Caledonian Publishing – then-publishers of The Herald and the Glasgow Evening Times. and Scottish
  - 6 October – Scottish updates its on-screen presentation.
  - October – United News & Media buys Scottish Television's 20% stake in HTV.
  - 1 November – SMG plc and BSkyB launch Sky Scottish as a joint venture. Broadcast for two hours each evening, the channel is aimed at Scots living in other parts of the UK.
- 1997
  - June – SMG buys Grampian Television, the ITV contractor for Northern Scotland, for £105 million. Shortly afterwards, the company became SMG.
- 1998
  - 31 May – Sky Scottish closes because the channel failed to meet its financial targets.
  - 15 November – The public launch of digital terrestrial TV in the UK takes place.
- 1999
  - 24 March – Mirror Group sells its 18.6% stake in SMG to Granada.
  - 30 April – S2 launches.

== 2000s ==
- 2000
  - 28 February – Having decided not to adopt the 1999 ITV generic look, Scottish and Grampian launch a new on-screen logo.
  - December – SMG acquires a 14.9% stake in Scottish Radio Holdings. and four months later it increases its stake to 27.7%.
- 2001
  - 27 July – S2 closes and consequently ITV2 starts broadcasting in Scotland.
- 2002
  - No events.
- 2003
  - 27 April – After 1,517 episodes and more than 23 years on air, the final edition of soap opera Take the High Road is broadcast.
  - June – STV North's Aberdeen headquarters move to new smaller studios in the city's Tullos area in June 2003.
- 2004
  - January – SMG sells its stake in Scottish Radio Holdings to EMAP for £90 million in anticipation of consolidation in the radio market.
  - 8 January – STV launches a new political magazine programme Politics Now. It replaces Platform and Grampian's politics and current affairs programme Crossfire.
  - 2 February – SMG sells its stake in GMTV to ITV plc for £31 million.
  - Autumn – The lunchtime edition of Scotland Today is axed.
- 2005
  - No events.
- 2006
  - 30 May – Scottish Television is rebranded as 'STV' and the rebrand is rolled out across all of Scotland, thereby consigning the Grampian Television brand to history after 45 years. The area formerly covered by Grampian is now called STV North.
  - STV moves from their Cowcaddens base to a new, smaller building at Pacific Quay alongside the headquarters of BBC Scotland.
- 2007
  - 8 January – STV launches separate news services for the East and West of the STV Central region, initially as a five-minute opt out within the 6:00 pm edition of Scotland Today on weeknights.
- 2008
  - 22 May – After more than 50 years on air, STV axes Scotsport, doing so after BBC Scotland acquires highlights of the Scottish Premier League.
  - 1 October – Scottish Media Group is rebranded STV Group plc. It does this because it wants to highlight its renewed focus on television.
  - November – STV starts opting out of ITV programmes they claim were not performing well in their broadcast region'. ITV's coverage of the FA Cup is also dropped.
- 2009
  - 23 March –
    - STV relaunches its on-screen presentation.
    - Scotland Today is relaunched as STV News at Six.
  - July – STV announces that it is withdrawing more ITV programmes from tis schedules, such as The Bill, Doc Martin, Midsomer Murders, Poirot, Lewis, instead preferring to concentrate on programming made within Scotland.
  - September – ITV plc claims that STV were in breach of their network agreements by making this decision and sued STV for £38 million.

== 2010s ==
- 2010
  - STV plc sells off the last of its non-television assets. This helped reduce the group's debt and allowed it to concentrate on its core television businesses.
  - 6 June – STV HD launches on Freeview and Virgin Media.
  - 20 October – Digital switchover in STV North (formerly the Grampian Television region) is completed when the analogue signal emanating from Rosemarkie is switched off.
  - 7 November – The final episode of Taggart is broadcast, bringing to an end a series which had been on air for more than 25 years.
- 2011
  - 11 January – STV +1 launches.
  - 27 April – ITV plc and STV settle their legal dispute, with the former receiving £18 million from STV.
  - May – Separate half-hour editions of STV News at Six for the East and West are launched along with localised late night news bulletins each weeknight.
  - 22 June – Digital switchover is completed in Scotland when the analogue signals at Black Hill are switched off.
  - 24 October – STV launches a 30-minute late evening news programme Scotland Tonight. It encompasses the weekly political programme Politics Now.
- 2012
  - March – A deal is announced between ITV and the other Channel 3 licence holders which would transform its commercial relationship with them after the broadcasters negotiated new Channel 3 networking arrangements. The deal would see STV and UTV become "affiliates" of the network, meaning they would pay an up-front fee for the rights to broadcast ITV content. At the time, the licence holders paid a percentage of the Channel 3 network costs based on their share of qualifying revenue.
  - April – STV's Edinburgh operation moves from George Street in the city centre to a new studio at Fountainbridge.
- 2013
  - No events.
- 2014
  - 28 April – STV HD launches on the Sky and Freesat EPGs.
  - 2 June –
    - STV launches the first of its local television channels – STV Glasgow.
    - A new set of idents is launched.
- 2015
  - 12 January – STV launches its second local television channel STV Edinburgh.
  - March – STV is awarded three more local licenses, to cover Aberdeen, Ayr and Dundee.
- 2016
  - No events.
- 2017
  - 24 April – STV merges its local channels and relaunches them as a single channel called STV2. The output includes a primetime weeknight news programme called STV News Tonight which combines news from across all of Scotland with UK and international news.
- 2018
  - 30 June – STV2 closes down and the channel's assets are sold to That's Media, owners of the That's TV network of local television stations in England. The closure results in the cancellation of STV News Tonight.
  - 7 September – The Edinburgh edition of STV News at Six ends and is replaced on the 10th by shorter opt-outs within a Central Scotland programme.
- 2019
  - No events.

== 2020s ==
- 2020
  - No events.
- 2021
  - No events.
- 2022
  - November – STV launches Night Vision, which features news, sport and weather from across Scotland. Previously, STV had broadcast ITV's overnight filler programme ITV Nightscreen.
- 2023
  - No events.
- 2024
  - October – The Central Scotland edition of STV News at Six reverts to a single-anchor format, including a pre-recorded opt for the East of the region. The Edinburgh studio is closed and the following March, newsgathering and sales staff move from Fountainbridge to Orchard Brae House on Queensferry Road.
- 2025
  - 25 September – STV announces that it will seek permission from Ofcom to merge its two regional news services and axe its sub-regional opt-outs. If approved, separate news programmes for the North and Central areas would be replaced with a pan-regional programme covering both STV licence areas from Glasgow, with the Aberdeen studios closing.
- 2026
- 1 June – Ofcom approves STV's plan to axe its separate news programme for the north of Scotland.

== See also ==
- History of ITV
- History of ITV television idents
- Timeline of ITV
- Timeline of television in Scotland
