= Birdz (TV series) =

Canadian animated TV series

- Created by: Larry Jacobs
- Written by: Bruce Clark; Kim Thompson
- Directed by: Raymond Jafelice; Andrew Young
- Voices of: Susan Roman; David Huband; Sally Cahill; Stephanie Morgenstern
- Opening theme: "Surfin' Bird" performed by Cal Dodd
- Composers: Ray Parker; Tom Szczesnaik
- Country of origin: Canada
- Original language: English
- No. of seasons: 1
- No. of episodes: 13

Production
- Executive producers: Elizabeth Partyka; Patrick Loubert; Michael Hirsh; Clive A. Smith
- Producer: Larry Jacobs
- Running time: 22 minutes
- Production company: Nelvana Limited

Original release
- Network: CBS
- Release: 3 October 1998 – 2 January 1999

Birdz is a Canadian animated television series created by Larry Jacobs, who later worked on Cyberchase. It was produced by Nelvana Limited in association with CBS Television. The show was first aired on 3 October 1998 on CBS, with the final episode's airing on 2 January 1999. Later, it was shown in Scotland in 2001, aired on Scottish Television and Grampian TV. The show was returned from 2015 as part of the "Weans' World" block on STV Glasgow and STV Edinburgh.

== Plot ==
The show is about an anthropomorphic 10-year-old bird named Eddie Storkowitz, who films his everyday life in aspiration of becoming a filmmaker. His family includes his father, Morty, who is a psychiatrist and disciplinarian; mother Betty, an artist; college-age older sister Steffy; and baby sister Abby. Several episodes focus on Eddie's class, which includes an owl named Olivia, a robin named Spring, a turkey named Tommy, a woodpecker named Gregory, and a bat named Sleepy, plus teacher Miss Finch and principal Mr. Pip.

== Theme music ==
The song "Surfin' Bird" by the Trashmen was covered as a theme song for the series.

== Cancellation ==
The show's creator Larry Jacobs thought that the show received poor ratings because it aired after the news in most markets.

== Cast and characters ==
- Susan Roman as Eddie
- David Huband as Morty
- Sally Cahill as Betty
- Stephanie Morgenstern as Steffy
- Alison Sealy-Smith as Abby
- Jill Frappier as Miss Finch
- Len Carlson as Mr. Pip
- Chris Wiggins as Officer Pigeon
- Richard Binsley as Mr. Nuthatch
- Ruby Smith-Merovitz as Spring
- Karen Bernstein as Olivia
- Adam Reid as Tommy
- Julie Lemieux as Sleepy
- Rick Jones as Gregory

== Episodes ==
No.	Title	Original release date
1	"The Agony and the Eggstacy"	3 October 1998
Steffy has to watch Betty's newly-laid egg, but bribes Eddie into watching it. He leaves it to warm on the television so that he can spend his bribe money at the arcade with friends.
2	"Can't Buy Me Love"	10 October 1998
Eddie tries to win Miss Finch's attention by buying her a fancy gift with his father's credit card. He then buys gifts for his friends as well, angering his father.
3	"I Heard It Through the Grapevine"	17 October 1998
Striving to be a reporter, Eddie spreads misinformation about a man who lives in a haunted house after assuming that the man is also the subject of a horror novel Morty is reading. The man in the house turns out to be friendly.
4	"One Giant Leap"	24 October 1998
Eddie and Spring try to convince Tommy to get rid of the balloon he uses for flight. After he injures his foot in an attempt to fly, everyone comes to accept his balloon because he is a turkey and cannot fly.
5	"A Face in the Crowd"	31 October 1998
Eddie and his friends make a film for an amateur film contest judged by his favorite actor. However, his friends turn on him after they dislike how they appear in the result.
6	"Birdman"	7 November 1998
Eddie and Sleepy then follow Officer Pigeon with a video camera after hearing that a superhero named Birdman has been chasing bank robbers. Later, Birdman reveals himself to be Mr. Pip in disguise, and he and Eddie admit their guilt over interfering with Officer Pigeon's job.
7	"Let the Chicks Fall Where They May"	14 November 1998
The Storkowitzes migrate southward with Mr. Nuthatch, but Eddie procrastinates and forgets to pack the necessary equipment. As a result, he gets lost and is unable to signal for help.
8	"Father and Son Camp Out"	28 November 1998
Eddie is embarrassed by his father always wanting to spend quality time with him, so Betty encourages him to join Eddie's Bird Scout camping trip. The two bond after getting lost on a scavenger hunt.
9	"Gulls and Dolls"	5 December 1998
Eddie auditions for the lead role of a school musical by lip-syncing to Gregory's voice, to compensate both for Eddie's own inability to sing and Gregory's stage fright. Gregory then feels guilty about helping his friend, but steps in as his understudy after Eddie fakes losing his voice.
10	"Life of Riley"	12 December 1998
Riley Raven, a bird that Eddie knew from childhood, joins his class. His rebellious behavior influences Eddie to disobey his parents' rules (leading to him being grounded) and then run away from home. After he realizes that Riley misbehaves because his parents ignore him, Eddie realizes that his parents grounded him because they care, and decides to return to them.
11	"Dollars and Sense"	19 December 1998
Eddie's parents agree to buy him a zoom lens for his camera if he comes up with half the money himself. He convinces his friends to do various chores around the neighborhood for him, but the plan backfires. He then captures fish for money, but frees them after Steffy convinces him. The parents finally agree to buy him the lens for his good deed.
12	"Big Beak or Not Big Beak"	26 December 1998
Eddie misconstrues Miss Finch's comments on his beak and tries various methods to reduce it, causing him to forget about the video essay he was assigned. After she tells him that she meant to compliment his beak, Eddie gains newfound confidence in his self-appearance.
13	"Birdz of a Feather"	2 January 1999
After failing to enter a gang, Eddie and his friends form a comedy club and persuades everyone to join. As a result, his friends get in trouble for joking around in class and turn against him. He wins them back after beating the gang leader, and realizes that he does not have to belong to a club to have his friends.

== Telecast and home media ==
The show was first introduced in October 1998 on CBS's Saturday morning lineup with repeats until Spring 1999. In the 2000s, the show was also aired on the Omni Broadcasting Network. Later, it was shown in Scotland in 2001, aired on Scottish Television and Grampian TV (now STV North) - now both known as STV. The show was returned from 2015 as part of the "Weans' World" block on STV Glasgow and STV Edinburgh. The Series Also Premiered On Fox Kids In Latin America In 2002

In the late 1990s, Alliance Atlantis released videotapes of the show.

In 2019, the show has begun being uploaded to Corus' Retro Rerun YouTube channel. As of 2022, the show is now streaming on Tubi.
