= Shereen Nanjiani =

Scottish radio presenter

Shereen Nanjiani MBE
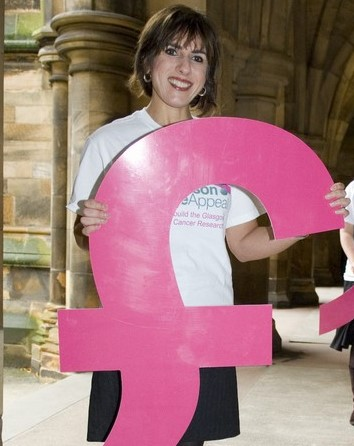
- Shereen Nanjiani at the Beatson Pebble Appeal £1K Challenge launch
- Born: 4 October 1961 (age 65); Elderslie, Scotland
- Education: Glasgow University
- Occupation: Radio presenter
- Years active: 1983–present
- Relatives: Kumail Nanjiani (second cousin)

Shereen Nanjiani (born 4 October 1961) is a Scottish radio presenter.

Before launching her radio career in 2006, Nanjiani was the chief news anchor at STV Central, having presented the news programme, Scotland Today since 1987. She is the first Asian-Scots presenter in Scotland and the longest serving female news presenter at STV.

== Early life ==
Nanjiani was born in Elderslie, Scotland on 4 October 1961 to a Gujarati (Pakistan) father and a White English mother. She is a second cousin of the Pakistani-American comedian Kumail Nanjiani.

Nanjiani worked on Hospital Radio Paisley for a short time in the late 1970s where she used to read some local news cuttings she had gathered during the week.

== Career ==
=== STV ===
Nanjiani earned a job as a trainee journalist in 1983 with STV. She was called in to present her first bulletin in 1987, when Sheena McDonald was ill.

Nanjiani has hosted many programmes for STV, including religious affairs series Eikon and Secret Scotland in the late nineties. Nanjiani also hosted several editions of the Scottish Politician of the Year Awards on STV. On 16 February 2006, it was announced that Nanjiani, along with colleagues Jane Lewis and Sarah Heaney had accepted voluntary redundancy from STV.

Nanjiani left Scotland Today and STV on 5 May 2006. In interviews with the Scottish press, Nanjiani said that she was looking forward to other exciting projects away from live television.

On 28 August 2007, Shereen made her first STV Central appearance since her departure on the station's video blog, The Real MacKay.

=== BBC ===
On 20 June 2006, it was announced that Nanjiani was 'switching sides' to the BBC and she made her debut as a radio presenter on Friday 11 August as part of a set of changes to the presenting line-up of BBC Radio Scotland's news and current affairs programmes. Nanjiani started her radio career at BBC Scotland at the helm of lunchtime programme, Scotland Live, which she presented every Friday.

She presented Shereen, a live topical news and current affairs programme broadcast on BBC Radio Scotland originally every Sunday morning.

She appeared as herself in an episode of BBC police spoof comedy Scot Squad.

Nanjiani was appointed Member of the Order of the British Empire (MBE) in the 2019 Birthday Honours for services to broadcasting in Scotland.
