= S2 (TV channel) =

Scottish television channel

- Country: Scotland
- Broadcast area: Scotland (Central and Northern)
- Headquarters: Glasgow, Scotland, UK

Programming
- Language: English
- Picture format: 576i (SDTV)

Ownership
- Owner: SMG plc
- Sister channels: Scottish TV, Grampian TV

History
- Launched: 30 April 1999; 26 years ago
- Closed: 27 July 2001; 24 years ago
- Replaced by: ITV2, ITV Sport Channel

Links
- Website: stv.tv

Availability (at time of closure)

Terrestrial
- ITV Digital: Channel 6

S2 was a television station broadcast throughout the Scottish and Grampian ITV regions by SMG plc, the holder of the Scottish and Grampian region ITV franchises. The channel existed for two years, from April 1999 until July 2001.

== History ==
SMG announced the creation of the channel in September 1997. The channel would take some programmes from ITV2, but would carry its own devolved schedule, with emphasis on Scottish sport, mainly football, horse racing and golf. Andrew Flanagan of SMG said on 8 September that Scottish did not set up its own service under concerns that it would "cannibalise" STV's advertising revenue.

S2 launched on the digital terrestrial platform ONdigital (The channel was also broadcast on cable television services NTL and Telewest) on 30 April 1999. Broadcasting from 4 pm and 2 am, the channel was targeted towards a 15- to 34-year-old youth audience and aired a mixture of drama and documentary programmes from the Scottish and Grampian libraries and a spree of new programmes. The channel's flagship programme, an entertainment programme named S2 Live, aired every night, presented by Sarah Heaney. S2 also broadcast sports coverage, including Scottish rugby.

By the beginning of 2001, the channel had all but lost its original intentions after removing almost all of its Scottish programmes and mostly became a simulcast of ITV2, but covered the ITV2 graphic with an opaque S2 graphic. This change caused controversy. As of February that year, the channel had an operational cost of £2.1 million and had a potential audience of 400,000 people.

Eventually, SMG signed a deal with Carlton Communications and Granada plc to add the standard ITV2 to the newly-rebranded ITV Digital service, and S2 was effectively replaced with ITV2 and the ITV Sport Channel on 27 July 2001. The SMG-produced output moved exclusively to Scottish and Grampian.

== See also ==
- ITV2
- STV
- STV2
- Sky Scottish
- UTV2
