= Uriah Rennie =

British football referee (1959–2025)

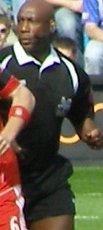
- Rennie in 2007
- Full name: Uriah Duddley Rennie
- Born: 23 October 1959; Jamaica
- Died: 7 June 2025 (aged 65); Sheffield, South Yorkshire, England
- Other occupation: Magistrate, university chancellor

Domestic
Years	League	Role
–1994	Northern Premier League	Referee
1994–1997	Football League	Referee
1997–2008	Premier League	Referee

International
Years	League	Role
2000–2004	FIFA listed	Referee

Uriah Duddley Rennie (23 October 1959 – 7 June 2025) was a British football referee. He was the first black referee to officiate in the Premier League, and officiated over 300 Premier League matches between 1997 and 2008. Outside of football, he was a magistrate in Sheffield and briefly served as chancellor of Sheffield Hallam University in 2025.

== Early life ==
Uriah Duddley Rennie was born on 23 October 1959 in Jamaica. He moved to Sheffield, South Yorkshire, England, at the age of six.

== Refereeing ==
Rennie began refereeing in 1979 in local leagues, then operated in the Northern Premier League until 1994, at which time he was appointed to The Football League list of referees. The Premier League's first black referee, he was given his first appointment in the competition on 13 August 1997, overseeing a game between Derby County and Wimbledon. He had to abandon the match, the first competitive game at Derby's new Pride Park Stadium, because of a floodlight failure.

Rennie became a FIFA referee in 2000, and joined the Select Group of professional referees the following year. Keith Hackett, head of the Professional Game Match Officials Board described him as "the fittest referee we have ever seen on the national and world scene."

At the end of 2004, he retired from the FIFA list, after reaching the compulsory age of 45, but made a return to active refereeing in November 2007. He retired again in 2008, having officiated in over 300 Premier League matches. Following his retirement, it was 15 years until another black referee officiated a Premier League match.

== Life outside football ==
Rennie was married and had a daughter and a son. He had a master's degree in business administration and law, and was a magistrate in Sheffield. He also practised both kick-boxing and aikido, achieving a black belt.

Rennie later became president of Hallam F.C. In that role, he officiated an historic Sheffield Rules–style football match dressed in a top hat. He refused to lend organisers of the 2022 FIFA World Cup in Qatar the world's oldest football trophy, Youdan Cup, due to Qatar's stance on LGBTQ+ rights. Rennie appeared as himself in the BBC Two drama Marvellous, broadcast in September 2014. In August 2015, he became the referee in the ITV game show, Freeze Out, presented by Mark Durden-Smith.

In November 2023, he was awarded an honorary doctorate at Sheffield Hallam University for his work in the community of Sheffield, namely Sheffield Federation for School Sports and Weston Park Hospital. In November 2024, it was announced he was to become the new chancellor of the university and he was installed in May 2025.

In April 2025, Rennie revealed he was learning to walk again after a rare condition left him paralysed from the waist down. His death was announced on 8 June 2025 by the Sheffield & Hallamshire County Football Association, Rennie having died the day prior, at the age of 65. Following the news, his family revealed that he had been privately battling cancer.
