= Macmillan Media =

Multimedia company

- Company type: News provider, media consulting
- Industry: Media
- Founder: Michael Macmillan
- Headquarters: Belfast, Dublin, Glasgow, London, Manchester, (United Kingdom)
- Area served: Television: North of Scotland, Central Scotland, Northern Ireland Other Media: United Kingdom
- Key people: Jane Veitch, Jim McClean
- Services: Online, radio and TV broadcasts, media training and consulting
- Website: www.macmillanmedia.co.uk

Macmillan Media is a multimedia company covering the UK and Ireland, working in Glasgow, Belfast, Dublin, Manchester and London, and owned by former BBC and ITN foreign correspondent Michael Macmillan.

== Daybreak regional news ==
Until January 2013, Macmillan Media produced Daybreak Northern Ireland and Daybreak Scotland bulletins on weekdays at 06.15, 07.15 and 08.15. UTV, the local ITV contractor had not produced the bulletin since December 1994 due to a dispute between GMTV and UTV. UTV was replaced during GMTV (later Daybreak) by Reuters, followed by ITN, then Macmillan Media.

Macmillan Media began providing the GMTV news bulletins in Central and Northern Scotland on 3 December 2007. The two bulletins, both known as Daybreak Scotland (previously GMTV Scotland) shared the same team, and were broadcast from the same building in Glasgow.

It took over the contract when GMTV did not renew STV's contract to supply early morning Scotland Today and North Today bulletins. STV had supplied GMTV with its news since the breakfast channel took over from TV-am in 1993.

Macmillan Media lost the contracts to provide local Daybreak bulletins from January 2013, when the contracts were re-awarded to UTV and STV.

Macmillan Media has produced content for a range of purposes including creative documentaries, broadcast features, animated explainer videos, corporate marketing and promotion, health and safety training and induction training videos. The company has previously provided online news bulletins for newspapers including Belfast Telegraph.

The company produces news bulletins for Q Radio stations in Northern Ireland.
