= Raman Bhardwaj =

Scottish journalist, television presenter and producer

- Education: University of Glasgow
- Occupations: Broadcaster, journalist, producer
- Years active: 1997–present
- Employers: STV (2001–present); Sky (United Kingdom)
- Notable work: Scotland Today; STV News

Raman Bhardwaj is a Scottish broadcast journalist, television presenter and producer. He is currently the Sports Editor & presenter for the Central Scotland edition of STV News at Six.

Bhardwaj's work entails presenting the sports section of the programme - both in studio and on location. He reports regularly on a number of different sports including football, rugby, golf, tennis and cricket.

Bhardwaj graduated from the University of Glasgow with a master's degree in Social Science in 1996. The following year, his broadcasting career began as a researcher within STV's current affairs team in 1997. After progressing to become a political reporter at the station, Bhardwaj headed to London to work as a sports journalist for Sky News and Sky Sports. He rejoined the Scotland Today team in 2001, after being offered a job as sports reporter and occasional sports presenter for the programme.

In 2006, as part of restructuring at STV, Bhardwaj was promoted to main sports presenter and sports editor for Scotland Today, and the programme's successor, STV News at Six.

During the years in which ITV Sport held the rights to UEFA Champions League matches involving Scottish teams, STV would produce their own coverage for its broadcasting areas (Northern and Central Scotland) - Bhardwaj hosted a few of these matches between 2011 and 2015. He also presented STV's coverage of UEFA Euro 2020 with matches involving Scotland.
