= Jane Lewis =

Jane Lewis may refer to:

- Jane Corwin (née Lewis, born 1964), American politician and businesswoman
- Jane Lewis (academic) (born 1950), British social scientist and academic
- Jane Lewis (journalist), Scottish sports journalist and broadcaster
