= Siobhan McGarry =

Northern Irish TV presenter and journalist (born 1966)

- Born: Siobhan McNeice; January 1966 (age 60)
- Occupations: Broadcaster and Journalist
- Known for: Broadcaster

Siobhan McGarry (née McNeice,) born January 1966 is a television presenter and freelance journalist from Northern Ireland.

== Broadcasting career ==
Siobhan McGarry is a broadcaster and media expert. Her company Media Friendly NI provides media training and consultancy for the public, private and voluntary sectors throughout the UK and Ireland. McGarry also produces highly creative, broadcast quality DVDs and web videos for a wide range of clients. McGarry works as a presenter for Downtown Radio and has worked as a presenter and reporter for UTV in Northern Ireland. She continues to write news, features and travel articles for various outlets.

Her accomplishments include having written for The Sunday Times, The Irish Times and The Sunday Life. From 2000 to 2005 McGarry worked as a reporter and newsreader for GMTV Northern Ireland and acted as Ireland Correspondent for ITN. She moved to UTV as a presenter and reporter for UTV Life, initially providing maternity cover for Alison Fleming. In 2006, McGarry won the award for "Best Broadcast Report" at the Visit USA Association Media awards in London for a report she filmed about visiting New York. Prior to her television work, McGarry worked at Downtown Radio.

== Personal life ==
Before becoming a journalist, McGarry worked at her parents’ restaurant in Lurgan.
