= Angus Simpson =

Angus Simpson is best known as an ex-presenter of STV's flagship news programme Scotland Today. Prior to joining the programme in 1986, he was a reporter and presenter for Border Television's news magazine programme, Lookaround. As well as working on regional news, he also presented numerous other current affairs and entertainment programmes for Scottish Television including documentary strand Scottish Eye and social affairs series Scottish Action.

He is also a media trainer, video producer and corporate presenter and currently presents Angus Simpson 'On The Move' on Saga 105.2 FM

In 2011, he appeared as himself in a short entitled, "Heads Up," directed and written by Michael Ferns, co-written by Sam Ferguson. In 2012, he starred as himself in "Johnny Beattie: In the Limelight," which was a gala celebrating Beattie's 60 years in show business.
