= Sarah Heaney =

Scottish television presenter

Sarah Heaney (born 19 May 1970) is a former Scottish television presenter.

== Life and career ==
She began her TV career with Live TV as a news reporter, then went on to front S2 Live on the now defunct SMG digital channel S2. In early 2000 Heaney moved to newsreading on Scotland Today. During this time, Heaney also presented, STV Magazine show "Room at the Top"/"Summer at the Top", which broadcast live from the top of Buchanan Galleries in Glasgow. Heaney also fronted Scottish Passport and Moviejuice, a film show. In 2006 she took voluntary redundancy as part of major shake-up of Scotland Today. Heaney presented live and recorded broadcast programmes. Heaney also had a beauty column in the Daily Mail and wrote occasionally for other publications. In September 2006 she hosted ITV's Big Hearts, Big Night, and was a guest for the STV's 2008 online video blog, The Real MacKay. Heaney fronted a crime programme with news reader Mark Austin for ITV. Manhunt – Solving Britain's Crimes where Heaney and Austin appeal to the public for information on the UK's most wanted criminals.

In 2008, she joined Mark Durden-Smith on Wish You Were Here...? Now & Then, a 25-part series where the hosts revisit destinations, originally visited by Judith Chalmers (Mark's mother) and other WYWH? presenters in the original 1974 series, to see how much they have changed. Since 2012, Heaney has had presenting work on ITV's overnight teleshopping strand The Store. In October 2013, Heaney helped launch The Store as a dedicated full-time shopping channel on Sky and Freesat.

== Personal life ==
Heaney lives in London. She is divorced from businessman Ed Adams with whom she shares two children: Edward William Adams, born on the 17 June 2006 and second son Will was born in May 2008.
