= Wish You Were Here...? =

British TV series (1974–2003)

- Genre: Travel
- Presented by: Judith Chalmers; Chris Kelly; Anthea Turner; Mark Durden-Smith
- Country of origin: United Kingdom
- Original language: English

Production
- Running time: c. 25 minutes (excluding adverts)
- Production company: Thames Television

Original release
- Network: ITV
- Release: 7 January 1974 – 29 June 2003

Wish You Were Here...? is a British television series that was first broadcast on 7 January 1974 on ITV. It was a series of 30-minute shows about travel and holidays. The show was broadcast during peak viewing hours. The series was cancelled in 2003 after a reshuffling of the primetime Monday 7pm slot on ITV.

== Wish You Were Here...? Now & Then ==
ITV commissioned a new version of the show for 2008, Wish You Were Here...? Now & Then, giving Judith Chalmers' son Mark Durden-Smith the role of main host, along with Sarah Heaney. The 25-part series saw Durden-Smith and Heaney revisit destinations featured in the original series, to see how much they have changed, and was filmed within production studios and not directly on location.

The programme was produced by Talkback Thames, and began on 14 January 2008 at 4.30pm. The full series was not screened on STV and UTV.

== Opening titles ==
The opening titles in the late 1970s was a sequence of scenes, one of which was children jumping on a bouncy castle. By January 1986, the opening sequence and theme tune also changed. By now, the opening sequence included an animation of a suitcase being closed, put on a plane and jetting off. The opening titles and theme tune were changed again in about 1988. The theme tune used then was called "The Carnival" and was performed by Gordon Giltrap. The BBC's equivalent programme, Holiday, used a section of Giltrap's "Heartsong" as its theme tune from 1978 until the end of the 1985 series.

== Sponsorships ==
- Barclaycard (1993)
- Vernons Pools (1995)
- SEAT (1996–1999)
- Dorling Kindersley Travel Guides (2000)
- Post Office Ltd (2001–2002)
- Slim Fast (2003)

== Presenters ==
- Judith Chalmers (1974–2003)
- Jim Lloyd
- Chris Kelly
- John Carter
- Mary Nightingale (1999–2001)
- Martin Roberts
- Anneka Rice (1986)
- Anthea Turner (1996–1999)
- Anna Walker (1991–1996)
- Ruth England (2001–2003)
- Steve Hume
- Denise van Outen (1999)
- Heather Mills (1999)
- Davie Kirkpatrick
- Gloria Hunniford
- Tris Payne (1993)
- Victoria Studd
- Nick Knowles (1998)

== See also ==
- Holiday (TV series)
- Oryol i Reshka, a Ukrainian Russian language show with a similar format
