= John Toye =

Scottish television presenter (1936–1992)

- Born: John Arlingham Toye; 18 April 1936; London, England
- Died: 28 April 1992 (aged 56); Devon, England
- Occupations: Television presenter and newsreader
- Known for: Anchor of Scotland Today
- Notable credit: Scottish Television
- Parent(s): Geoffrey Toye and Dorothy Fleitman

John Arlingham Toye (18 April 1936 – 28 April 1992) was an English television presenter and newsreader on Scottish Television for more than 20 years, and is best known as the former anchor on its flagship news programme Scotland Today.

== Life and career ==
John Toye was born in London, England, into a musical family. His father was the conductor and composer Geoffrey Toye, and his mother was Dorothy Fleitman. As a child, he spent time in America and was once rescued from a cruise ship torpedoed en route to Britain during the Second World War. He studied classical music in America and spent time living with Navajo Native Americans, before attending drama school in London.

Toye began his career in the theatre, spending ten years in jobs ranging from Shakespearean roles to building stage scenery. He married Sheila Ward, a scenic designer, in the early 1960s while still a struggling actor. After working in touring theatre, he applied for a job with STV (then known as Scottish Television) in 1964.

His first role on television was as a presenter on Today Is Tuesday before becoming the main anchor on the station's main early evening flagship news programme, Scotland Today, in September 1972. His almost nightly appearances on STV in the 70s turned Toye into a well-known figure in central Scotland, and he regularly appeared off screen, opening shows or making presentations for charities and other worthwhile causes. A revamping of Scotland Today in 1984 brought his news presenting to an end, although he remained with STV for a brief spell presenting a weekly consumer programme, What's Your Problem? before being sacked during the summer of 1986, as part of an overhaul of the current affairs at STV.

In 1986, Toye appeared in court for drunk driving, for the second time in three years, and was warned that if he appeared again he would be sent to prison. He moved to South Molton in Devon in 1990 to start a new life, but failed to relaunch his career and spent the next few years battling against alcoholism combined with depression and financial worries.

== Death ==
Toye was found dead at his Devon flat on 28 April 1992. A shotgun lay next to his body. He was 56 years of age. His funeral was held at South Molton Parish Church in Devon on 15 May 1992, and he was later cremated. His wish was that his ashes should be scattered on the River Clyde. At an inquest held on 29 May 1992, the coroner recorded a verdict of suicide.

Shortly after his death, the Scottish Daily Record ran the headline "John Toye may have fired the trigger but STV loaded the gun", a quote that was attributed to his one time co-presenter on Scotland Today, Bob Cuddihy. Cuddihy maintained that Toye never recovered from being axed as the presenter of Scotland Today and was treated very poorly by STV. When once asked how he would like to be remembered, Toye replied: "Just as a nice guy who tried to do a good job."

John Toye's ashes are interred in Rosneath cemetery, close to his former home at Clynder on the Gare Loch. A headstone marks the spot, titled "John Toye Actor".
