= Daybreak Scotland =

Television news service

- Daybreak Scotland CSO set, September 2012 (pictured is presenter, Cameron McKenna)
- Also known as: GMTV Scotland (2007–2010)
- Countries of origin: Scotland, United Kingdom
- Original language: English

Production
- Production locations: Glasgow, Scotland
- Editors: Lindsey Archibald (Central region), Elspeth Badger (North region)
- Camera setup: Multi-camera
- Running time: 2 minutes
- Production company: Macmillan Media

Original release
- Network: ITV Breakfast (via STV)
- Release: 3 December 2007 – 21 December 2012

Related
- Scotland Today (Central); North Today (North); STV News; Daybreak; Daybreak Northern Ireland

Daybreak Scotland (previously GMTV Scotland) is the regional news broadcaster for the two ITV regions in northern and central Scotland, provided for the ITV breakfast station ITV Breakfast. The bulletins were produced for Daybreak (previously GMTV) by Macmillan Media, and were broadcast from studios in Glasgow.

Before 3 December 2007, the regional news opt outs during GMTV were provided by the ITV franchise holders in central and northern Scotland, STV Central and STV North respectively. However, in 2007, the contract for providing the regional news was awarded to Macmillan Media.

Macmillan Media also produced Daybreak Northern Ireland news for broadcast in Northern Ireland. Meanwhile, the regional news for the ITV regions in England and Wales and the Channel Islands are produced by the corresponding ITV plc regions. Viewers in southern Scotland received pan-regional news from the ITV Tyne Tees & Border region.

GMTV Scotland was rebranded as Daybreak Scotland in September 2010, when GMTV was replaced by new breakfast programme, Daybreak. Regional bulletins aired three times each weekday, and included a look at the days main headlines, a travel news update, and a weather forecast. Separate bulletins were produced for the STV Central and STV North franchise areas.

The Daybreak Scotland service by Macmillan Media ended on Friday 21 December 2012 with STV News resuming production of the breakfast news opt-outs from January 2013 onwards.

== The team ==
- Lindsey Archibald (Presenter & Central News Editor)
- Elspeth Badger (North News Editor)
- Catherine Brown (Presenter & News Editor)
- Laura Haldane (Presenter & Central Video Journalist)
- Katie Hunter (Presenter & News Editor)
- Andrew McBroom (North Presenter & Central Video Journalist)
- David McCann (Central Video Journalist)
- Cameron McKenna (Presenter)
- Marie-Clair Munro (Presenter)
- Brian O'Neill (Presenter & News Editor)
- Kirsteen O'Sullivan (Presenter & News Editor)
- John Robertson (North Video Journalist)
- Andrew Turnbull (Central Video Journalist)
- Connie McLaughlin (Presenter & News Editor)
