= Jane Lewis (journalist) =

Scottish sports journalist and broadcaster

Jane Lewis is a Scottish sports journalist and broadcaster, who was a sports presenter for Scotland Today, STV Central's now-defunct regional news programme.

== Career ==
Lewis joined Scotland Today in April 1999 after previous stints with BBC radio and Sky News.

As a result of mass redundancies both in the newsroom and technical support division, Lewis, along with presenters Shereen Nanjiani and Sarah Heaney all took voluntary redundancy. She signed off from the news programme on 24 April 2006.
