= Manhunt – Solving Britain's Crimes =

British television series

Manhunt – Solving Britain's Crimes is a programme aired by ITV in the UK. It is very similar to the BBC's Crimewatch, which ran for 22 years prior to the first airing of Manhunt, on 4 December 2006. A second edition of the programme aired on 29 May 2007.

Working in conjunction with the charity Crimestoppers UK, Manhunt profiles 10 of the country's most wanted criminals, and appeals for help from the public to track them down. The pilot episode of the show gained 5 million viewers, and received 9,000 calls from the public.

The programme is produced by talkbackTHAMES, and hosted by ITV News head anchor Mark Austin, and ex-Scotland Today newsreader Sarah Heaney.
