= Daybreak Northern Ireland =

Television news service

- Daybreak N. Ireland's CSO set, September 2012 (pictured is presenter, Jane Veitch)
- Also known as: GMTV Northern Ireland (1994-2010)
- Countries of origin: Northern Ireland, United Kingdom
- Original language: English

Production
- Production locations: Belfast, Northern Ireland
- Camera setup: Multi-camera
- Running time: 2 minutes
- Production companies: Macmillan Media (2005-2012), ITN (2000-2005), Reuters (1994-2000)

Original release
- Network: ITV Breakfast (via UTV)
- Release: January 1995 – 21 December 2012

Related
- UTV Live; Daybreak; Daybreak Scotland

Daybreak Northern Ireland (previously GMTV Northern Ireland) is the regional news strand for Northern Ireland provided for the ITV breakfast station ITV Breakfast.

Unlike the ITV plc-owned regions, UTV – the ITV contractor for Northern Ireland – did not provide regional news broadcasts during Daybreak (previously GMTV). This was due to a dispute between UTV and GMTV which dates back to 1994 when UTV opted out of the national breakfast contractor in breach of their broadcasting licence to provide live coverage of the breaking news of the Combined Loyalist ceasefire.

GMTV Northern Ireland was rebranded as Daybreak Northern Ireland in September 2010, when GMTV was replaced by new breakfast programme, Daybreak. Regional bulletins aired three times each weekday, and included a look at the days main headlines, a travel news update, and a weather forecast.

== Service ==
In January 1995, GMTV contracted the service out to Reuters, who then provided the GMTV national news service. The service was produced by ITN from March 2000. Macmillan Media, a company founded by former ITN and BBC correspondent Michael Macmillan, won the contract to provide news bulletins in 2005.

Macmillan Media took over from STV as the regional breakfast news provider in the Central Scotland and Northern Scotland regions in 2007.

The Daybreak Northern Ireland service by Macmillan Media ended on Friday 21 December 2012, with UTV resuming production of the breakfast news opt-outs from January 2013 onwards.

== The team ==
- Sonia Butterworth (Now with U105)
- Richard Cull
- Lynda Fulford
- Lindsey Armstrong (now freelancing with UTV after working at BBC Northern Ireland)
- Vicki Hawthorne (now freelance, appears on Sky News)
- Emma Johnston
- Aideen Kennedy (now with UTV)
- Barbara McCann (now with BBC Northern Ireland)
- Siobhan McGarry
- Maura O'Brien
- Kirsteen O'Sullivan (Now with TV3)
- Charlie Oundo
- Paul Reilly (now with UTV)
- Nicola Thompson (now with BBC)
- Jane Veitch
- Patricia Wilkinson (now with BBC Northern Ireland)
- Adrian Horsman (now with Christian Aid Ireland)
