= Heather Simpson (journalist) =

Heather Simpson (née McGinty) is a Scottish broadcast journalist and presenter, best known for her work for STV News in central Scotland.

After studying English at university, Simpson worked for CSV Media, helping to produce a number of community programming. During her time at CSV, she joined Scottish Television on a work experience placement for the regional programme, Wheel Nuts. After joining the station permanently, she started work in the Scotland Today newsroom as a news forward planner before progressing to present short news bulletins. During this time, Simpson was also a reporter for the current affairs programme Seven Days.

Simpson later became a stand-in presenter for Scotland Today and latterly, the central edition of STV News at Six, for which she was also a producer. She was also a stand-in presenter/producer for STV Central's online video blog, (Not) The Real MacKay. Simpson left STV in 2011.
