= Sandra Chalmers =

British radio producer and broadcaster

Sandra Locke "Sandy" Chalmers (29 February 1940 – 2 February 2015) was a British radio producer and broadcaster, who was editor of Woman's Hour on BBC Radio 4 in the 1980s.

== Early life ==
Chalmers was born in Gatley, Stockport, Cheshire. Her father was an architect and her mother a medical secretary. She attended Withington Girls' School. As children, she and her older sister Judith appeared regularly on the BBC Manchester programme Children's Hour. Sandra then studied English at Victoria University of Manchester (now Manchester University), becoming president of the Women Students' Union.

== Career ==
Chalmers worked at the advertising agency J Walter Thompson in London, before starting to work regularly on radio in Manchester. In 1970 she became a senior producer, newsreader and host on the newly established station BBC Radio Manchester. Then, during the mid-1970s, she was appointed as manager of BBC Radio Stoke, becoming the first woman to manage a BBC local radio station.

In 1983, Chalmers was appointed editor of Woman's Hour, the first mother of young children to edit the programme. She was responsible for developing the use of phone-ins in the series. According to presenter Sue MacGregor, Chalmers "enlivened Woman's Hour's mix of the important, the frivolous, and the necessary: gender politics, women's health, recipes, book readings, interviews with noteworthy women – and childcare. She had effectively been the single mother of young teenagers for some time." She created It's Your World, a live phone-in radio show transmitted on both Radio 4 and the BBC World Service. She left Woman's Hour in 1987. In 1990, Chalmers started the BBC's Radio Press, Publicity and Promotions department, becoming its Head. She created visitor attraction 'The BBC Experience' and was appointed General Manager, External Affairs, for BBC Radio. She left the BBC in 1992.

Chalmers later became Director of Communications at the charity Help the Aged, and ran her own public relations company, Chalmers Communications, which provided communications courses for Ofcom, the BBC and the Museum of London, among others.

In 1998, Chalmers joined the Board of Governors of Benjamin Franklin House, a museum and educational facility in the world's only remaining home of US Founding Father, diplomat, philosopher, and scientist, Benjamin Franklin. She served on the Board until 2010.

In 2000, Chalmers helped establish Saga Radio, a network aimed at the over-50s, which broadcast throughout the Midlands, Glasgow and on DAB. She had her own record show on Saga DAB Radio from 2000 to 2002.

== Personal life ==
Chalmers married John Lynton-Evans, a writer, in September 1965 in Cheshire. The couple divorced in the late 1980s. She was a Freeman of the City of London.

She died in February 2015 of a stroke, aged 74, survived by a son, Richard, a daughter, Becky, and five grandchildren: Emma, Freya, Kate, Daniel and Ollie.
