= Neil Durden-Smith =

English sports commentator (born 1933)

Neil Durden-Smith OBE
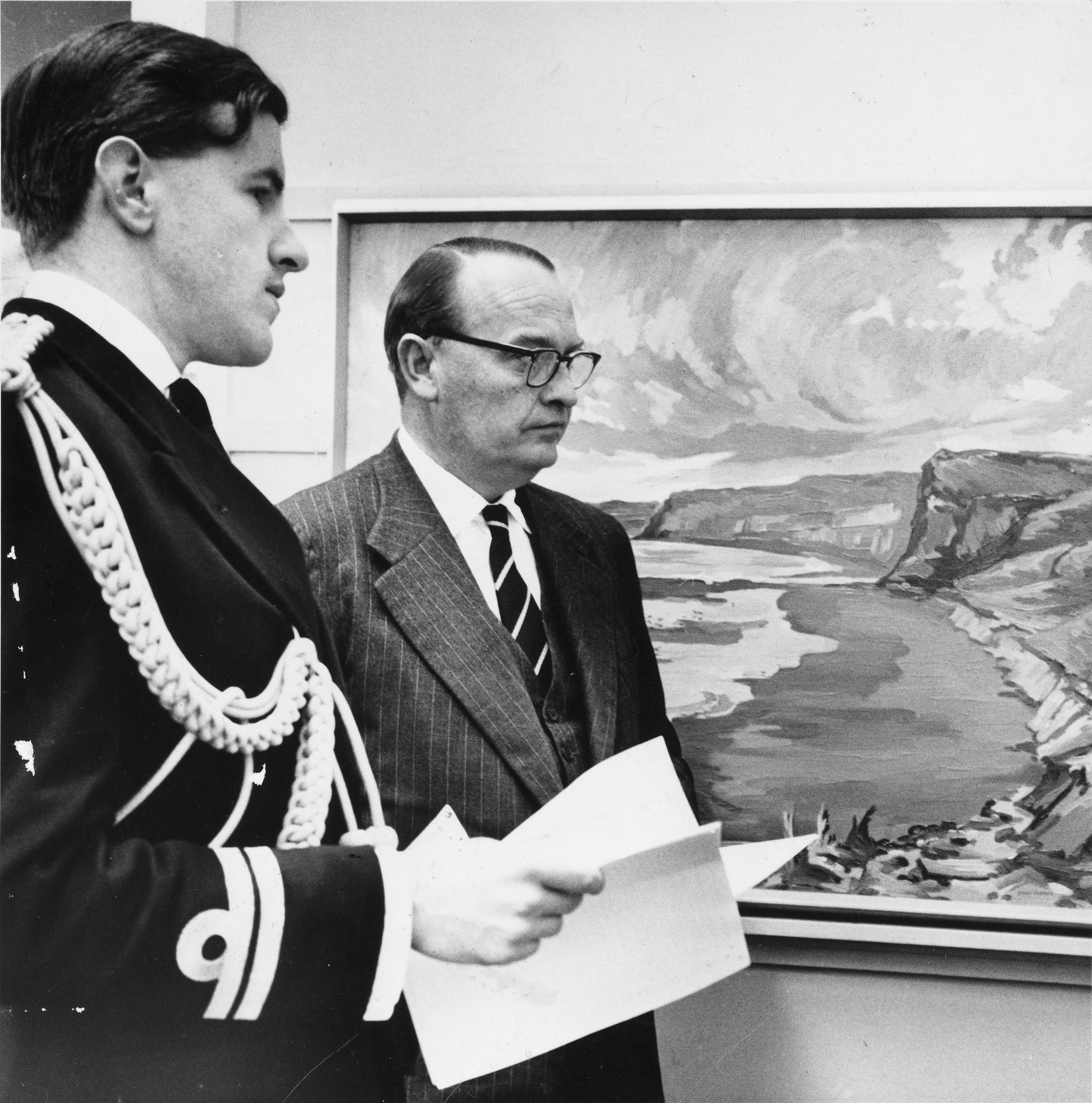
- Durden-Smith (left) with Lord Cobham in 1958

Personal information
- Born: 18 August 1933 (age 93); Richmond-upon-Thames, Surrey, England
- Batting: Right-handed
- Role: Batsman
- Relatives: Judith Chalmers (m. 1964; died 2026); Mark Durden-Smith (son)

Career statistics
Competition	First-class
Matches	4
Runs scored	111
Batting average	22.20
100s/50s	0/1
Top score	50
Catches/stumpings	0/–
- Source: Cricket Archive, 27 November 2014

Neil Durden-Smith (born 18 August 1933) is an English former sports commentator. He was previously a naval officer and played a small number of first-class cricket matches.

== Life and career ==
Durden-Smith was educated at Aldenham School and the Britannia Royal Naval College in Dartmouth, Devon. His service as an officer in the Royal Navy from 1952 to 1963 included a period as aide-de-camp to the Governor-General of New Zealand, Lord Cobham, from 1957 to 1959. He worked as a radio and television sports commentator and producer in England from the 1960s to the 1990s, often covering hockey.

Durden-Smith played four matches of first-class cricket in the 1960s. His highest scores were 33 and 50 in his first match, for Combined Services against Nottinghamshire in 1961.

Durden-Smith was appointed OBE in 1997. He was married to television presenter Judith Chalmers from 1964 until her death in May 2026. They have a son, Mark, who is also a television presenter, and a daughter.
