= Freeze Out (game show) =

2015 British game show

- Genre: Game show
- Presented by: Mark Durden-Smith
- Starring: Uriah Rennie
- Country of origin: United Kingdom
- Original language: English
- No. of series: 1
- No. of episodes: 10

Production
- Running time: 60 minutes (inc. adverts)
- Production company: Talkback

Original release
- Network: ITV
- Release: 3 August – 14 August 2015

Freeze Out is an ITV game show presented by Mark Durden-Smith and refereed by Uriah Rennie, broadcast in August 2015. In 2016, ITV announced that the show would not return for a second series.

== Gameplay ==
Five contestants compete through four rounds of challenges by answering questions and pushing "sliders" (pucks with grip handles on top) on a circular ice table. Rennie, dressed in a referee's jersey, keeps time and resolves disputes as the "Ice Judge."

=== Smash Out ===
A cluster of seven blue sliders is placed at the centre of a circle on the table. Each player in turn answers a series of quick-fire questions, with each correct answer giving them the chance to fire one orange slider into the circle. The player's turn ends when either 90 seconds have elapsed or they have knocked all seven blue sliders out. If a blue slider hits the edge of the table and bounces back into the circle, it must be knocked out again. The player with the slowest time is eliminated.

=== Centre Slide ===
The table is divided into concentric rings worth 10, 20, 30, 40, and 50 points working inward, and a small circle at the centre worth 100 points. Each player fires one slider onto the table, and may try to knock other players' sliders away. After all four shots, each player answers a question for the point value in which their slider is resting. If a slider covers the boundary between two zones, the value is set by the zone in which the majority of it rests. The process is repeated four times, with the table being cleared after each pass, and the player with the lowest total score is eliminated.

=== Ice Breaker ===
The table is divided into equal thirds, each of which is in turn split into eight shards. Players stand opposite their respective sections. The host asks a series of questions on the buzzer, and the player who buzzes-in with the correct answer fires a slider toward their section. Any shards on which the slider lands are removed from play, regardless of which player controls them; if it lands on the border between shards, all of them are removed. If a contestant buzzes-in with a wrong answer, each opponent receives a free shot. In addition, if a player's slider lands entirely on one or more shards that have already been removed while all three players are still competing, both opponents receive a free shot. The first two players to remove all of their shards advance to the next round.

=== Face Off ===
The players stand on opposite sides of the table, which has a circle drawn at its centre. They are asked quick-fire questions on the buzzer for two minutes; a correct answer allows the player to fire a slider toward the circle, while a miss allows the opponent to fire one. Players may try to knock each other's sliders out of the circle. When time runs out, the player with more sliders completely inside the circle advances to the final.

=== Final ===
The player answers general knowledge questions for 60 seconds and wins one slider for each correct answer. Once time is up, a pattern of four concentric rings appears on the table, with a small circle at its centre. Working inward, the zones are worth £500, £1,000, £2,000, £4,000, and £10,000. The player attempts to land one slider completely within each zone, in ascending order. If any portion of a slider lands within a zone other than the correct one, that slider is removed from play. Hitting the correct zone gives the player the option of either ending the game and keeping all winnings for that zone, or continuing the game and reusing the slider. Running out of sliders ends the round and forfeits all winnings above £1,000, if the player has completed that level; if not, they leave with nothing.

=== Tie-breakers ===
When a tie must be broken between two players, a "Super Slide-Off" is played. A question is asked on the buzzer; a correct answer allows that player to decide who goes first, but a miss gives the choice to the opponent. Each player fires one slider across the table, and the one who lands closest to the centre wins the tiebreaker.

Ties between three or more players are broken with a "Slide-Off," in which each fires one slider as described above, in the order that they played in the Smash Out round. The player farthest from the centre is eliminated.

== Critical reception ==
Joel Golby of The Guardian stated that Durden-Smith's "genuine lack of personality makes him the perfect understated companion to [ice judge Rennie] ... whose thousand-yard stare and body language add to the growing feeling that you are actually watching an incredibly elaborate hostage video." He also commented that Freeze Out was "not a viable game show concept," comparing it to "a game someone's dad invented and forces them to play, every Christmas, on an extremely polished table in the dining room."
