= Jane Veitch =

Jane Veitch is a television news and weather presenter for ITV Breakfast regional news strand, Daybreak Northern Ireland.

Jane is originally from County Fermanagh. She began her career as a documentary producer. Jane has a degree from Trinity College in Dublin and completed her journalism studies at Belfast Metropolitan College. She currently works as a presenter for Macmillan Media Belfast.
