= Alison Fleming =

Northern Irish television presenter and journalist

Alison Fleming (b. Belfast) is a Northern Irish television presenter and journalist and a former presenter and reporter for UTV Live.

== Broadcasting career ==
Fleming studied journalism at Belfast Institute of Further and Higher Education. Her broadcasting career began at Belfast Community Radio, followed by further work at Downtown Radio and in the Northern Irish press.

Fleming joined UTV in 1998 as a freelance journalist, presenting weekend news bulletins as well as presenting and producing the magazine show UTV Life. She also narrated the 2006 UTV documentary series Teenage Kicks on the subject of teenage pregnancy.

== Personal life ==
Fleming is married with three children, called Finn, Annie and Kitty.
