= Scotland Today =

Scottish TV programme (1972–2009)

- Genre: Regional News
- Created by: Scottish Television (now branded STV)
- Country of origin: Scotland

Production
- Running time: Main bulletin: 30 minutes Short bulletins: Durations vary
- Production companies: Scottish Television (now branded STV)

Original release
- Network: Scottish Television (now branded STV)
- Release: 11 September 1972 – 22 March 2009

Related
- STV News at Six; North Tonight, Politics Now

Scotland Today is a Scottish regional news programme covering Central Scotland, produced by STV Central (formerly Scottish Television). Despite its name suggesting a national remit, the programme was actually limited to stories around STV's Central Belt franchise. North Tonight covered STV's North Scotland region (from North Fife upwards), until both programmes were renamed STV News at Six in March 2009.

== History ==
=== 1970s ===
Based in Glasgow, the programme began on 11 September 1972, as a successor to Dateline, which had been presented by Bill Tennent since 1970. Its style was very similar to its BBC counterpart Reporting Scotland. Initially co-presented by John Toye and Bill Kerr Elliot, within a year, Toye became its solo presenter, a position he held for 12 years. During the first six years, it was only on air for ten months of the year, taking a regular summer break and having its timeslot filled by regional magazine programmes including Isabel on... and Watch This Space. The programme's first editor was Russell Galbraith, then head of news for Scottish Television – he remained in the role until 1982.

=== 1980s ===
During the early 1980s, the programme experimented with studio presentation from both Glasgow and Edinburgh, featuring news round-ups from the West and the East of the region, albeit broadcast across Central Scotland. It was also one of the first regional news programmes to feature signed headlines for the deaf and hard of hearing.

Following John Toye's departure, a major overhaul of Scotland Today saw the programme relaunched as a feature-led magazine programme on Monday 8 October 1984. New co-presenters Sheena McDonald and Haig Gordon presented on sofas as opposed to desks, with the main regional news of the day confined to short bulletins before and after the programme, co-presented from Glasgow and Edinburgh. The critics were harsh about the new format – one such newspaper critic described it as The Goon Show – it's Tom and Jerry time but there's not much to laugh at. The Independent Broadcasting Authority also criticised the changes to the programme, and in July 1986, the station's head of news David Scott announced Scotland Today would revert to a harder news format the following Autumn, promising in a newspaper: you won't see pot plants, sofas or sculptures – these are nothing but distractions. The new look programme, launched on Monday 20 October 1986, saw Haig Gordon replaced by former reporter Malcolm Wilson, while feature elements were moved to a new lunchtime programme, Live at One Thirty, which began a fortnight earlier.

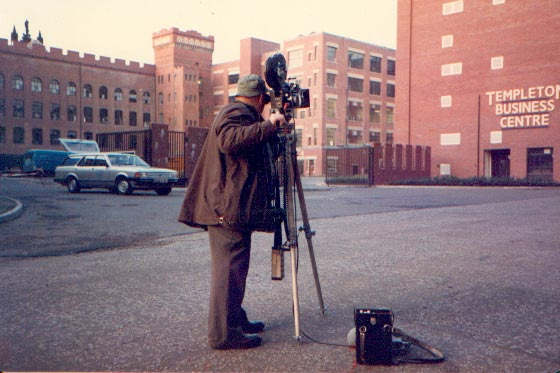
Scotland Today News – Film Crew at Glasgow's Templeton Business Centre

In 1983, Shereen Nanjiani joined the programme as a trainee reporter. Four years later, she presented Scotland Today for the first time owing to a shortage of staff. Nanjiani would remain as the programme's longest-serving anchor for the next 19 years. Among her co-presenters during that time were ex-Reporting Scotland anchor Viv Lumsden, former Border Television journalist Angus Simpson, Stephen Jardine, current Al Jazeera English correspondent Alan Fisher and current STV News at Six anchor John MacKay.

=== 1990s ===
In January 1993, Scottish Television launched a thirty-minute lunchtime edition of Scotland Today, presented by Angus Simpson and Kirsty Young. It was axed in the Autumn of 2004 although some elements of the lunchtime news were revived with the launch of The Five Thirty Show in January 2008.

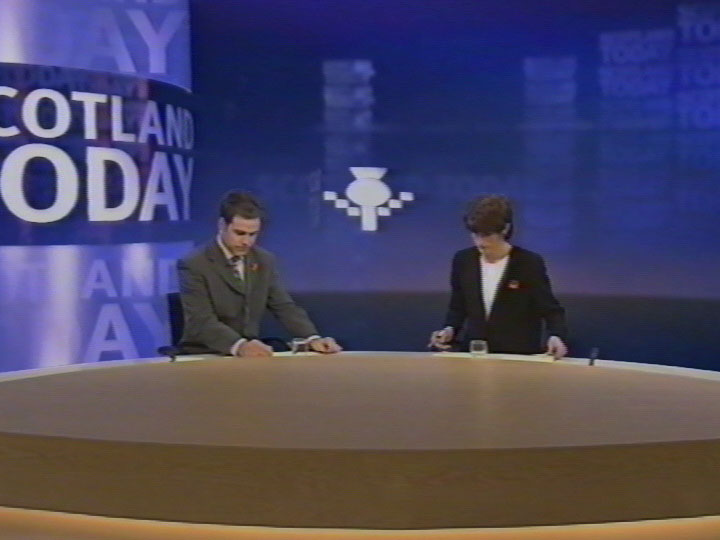
Scotland Today 1996 virtual set [by Liquid Image]

Scottish Television's news service was expanded further in November 1996 with the launch of Sky Scottish, a satellite channel set up as a joint venture with British Sky Broadcasting. Special mid-evening editions of Scotland Today were produced for the channel and presented by John MacKay and Andrea Brymer until the channel's closure in May 1998, owing to low ratings.

During its 37 years on air, Scotland Today covered major Scottish news stories such as the Dunblane massacre, the Lockerbie bombing, the referendum and subsequent set-up of the Scottish Parliament, the Glasgow International Airport attack in 2007 and the 2008 Glasgow East by-election. In 2000, the programme won the Royal Television Society award for Best Regional Daily News Magazine.

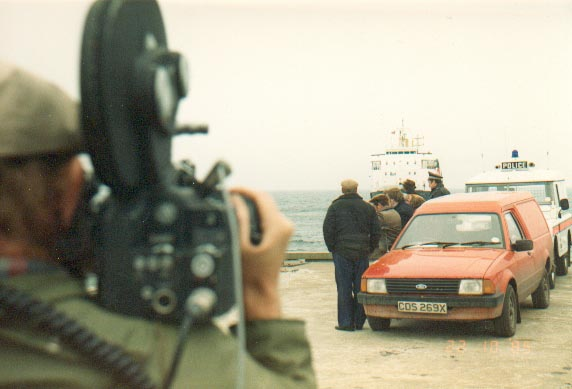
News Cameraman Varick Easton on Tiree filming arrival of the Oban ferry (October 1985)

=== 2000s ===
Scotland Today faced major changes in 2006 as a result of mass redundancies within the news and technical support divisions at Scottish TV. Main anchor Shereen Nanjiani signed off from the programme for the last time on 5 May 2006 – Sarah Heaney and sports presenter Jane Lewis also took voluntary redundancy. Several reporters also left the programme including Matt Bingham, Becky Hunter, Alan Saunby, Iona Scott and Roddy Scott. A few months later, the programme was relaunched to tie-in with the newly rebranded STV and the move to new purpose-built, smaller studios at Pacific Quay. The relaunch also saw John MacKay being made its chief solo anchor.

On 8 January 2007, Scotland Today launched a sub-regional news service, allowing viewers in the west and the east of central Scotland to receive a dedicated bulletin within the main 6pm programme. In the west, the programme covered from Tobermory to Falkirk, with the presenter based in the main Scotland Today studio in Glasgow. Meanwhile, the east opt-out reported from Anstruther to Dunbar and was presented & produced at STV's Edinburgh's studios. The East opt-out was directed from a technical gallery in Glasgow. The opt-outs continued under the current STV News at Six branding until separate 6pm programmes and late night bulletins for the two sub regions were launched in May 2011.

On 7 April 2007, it was revealed that GMTV had not renewed STV's contract to supply early morning regional news bulletins. The contract was awarded to the Belfast-based Macmillan Media, which has offices in London and Glasgow, and already provides regional GMTV News in Northern Ireland.GMTV Scotland began on 3 December 2007. STV had supplied GMTV with Scotland Today bulletins since the breakfast channel took over from TV-am in 1993. The contract to provide regional ITV Breakfast in Central and the North of Scotland returned to STV in 2013.

On 4 June 2007, the programme launched The Real MacKay, a supplementary series of video blogs, presented and produced by John MacKay for stv.tv. Its success led to the introduction of video blogs for the STV North region (Northern Exposure) and a spin-off Friday edition presented by Louise White entitled White Not MacKay.

On 18 March 2009, it was announced that the Scotland Today branding would be phased out as part of a major station revamp. On Monday 23 March 2009, the nightly news programme was relaunched and renamed as STV News at Six. The name is also used in the STV North region as a replacement for North Tonight.

== Past presenters and reporters ==
- Kaye Adams (late 1980s – early 1990s)
- Raman Bhardwaj (2001–2009)
- Andrea Brymer (1994–2002)
- Martin Geissler (1994–1998, 2000–2002)
- Sarah Heaney (1999–2006)
- Stephen Jardine (1993–2007)
- Jane Lewis (1999–2006)
- Viv Lumsden (1989–1998)
- John MacKay (1994–2009)
- Rob Maclean (1988–1990)
- Bill McFarlan (1982–1985, 1996–1999)
- Sheena McDonald (1984–1987)
- Shereen Nanjiani (1983–2006)
- Craig Oliver (1992–1993)
- Fiona Ross (early 1980s – 2000)
- Angus Simpson (1986–2003)
- Heather Simpson
- John Toye (1972–1984)
- Jim White (1979–1988)
- Kirsty Young (1992–1995)

Preceded by BBC Look North	RTS: Television Journalism; Regional Daily News Magazine; 2000	Succeeded by HTV News (Wales)
