= Judith Chalmers =

British television presenter (1935–2026)

Judith Chalmers OBE
- Chalmers in 1974
- Born: Judith Rosemary Locke Chalmers; 10 October 1935; Gatley, Stockport, England
- Died: 21 May 2026 (aged 90); London, England
- Occupation: Television presenter
- Years active: 1948–2017
- Spouse: Neil Durden-Smith (m. 1964)
- Children: 2, including Mark Durden-Smith
- Relatives: Sandra Chalmers (sister)

Judith Rosemary Locke Chalmers (10 October 1935 – 21 May 2026) was a British television and radio presenter. She began broadcasting for the BBC as a teenager and went on to present a wide range of programmes, including Family Favourites, Woman's Hour, Come Dancing and ITV's daytime magazine shows. Chalmers was best known for presenting the ITV travel series Wish You Were Here...? from 1974 to 2003. Her later work included appearances on programmes such as Celebrity Antiques Road Trip, Good Morning Britain, Lorraine and Celebrity Taste of Italy. She was appointed OBE in 1994.

== Early life ==
Judith Rosemary Locke Chalmers was born on 10 October 1935 in Gatley, Stockport, Greater Manchester, and grew up in Cheadle. Her father, David, was an architect, and died when Chalmers was 17. Her mother, Millie (née Broadhurst), was a medical secretary. She had a younger sister, Sandra Chalmers. Both siblings were educated at Withington Girls' School, an independent day school in Fallowfield near Withington, Manchester.

== Career ==
Chalmers began broadcasting for the BBC when she was 13, after being selected for BBC Northern Children's Hour by producer Trevor Hill. Her younger sister Sandra, who was later editor of Woman's Hour, also performed on Children's Hour. Chalmers presented many programmes from Manchester, including Children's Television Club, which later developed into Blue Peter based in London. She spent some time at secretarial college in Manchester in the early 1950s.

In the 1960s, Chalmers presented two major BBC radio programmes: Family Favourites, and Woman's Hour. She also appeared as the original Susan in The Clitheroe Kid, and was a foil for Ken Dodd in his radio show. Chalmers presented ballroom dancing competition programme Come Dancing for the BBC from 1961 to 1965.

During the 1970s, Chalmers regularly presented ITV's daytime magazine programme Good Afternoon, and its successors, including Afternoon Plus, and A Plus. She began presenting ITV's holiday programme Wish You Were Here? in 1974 and continued in the role until 2003.

In the 1980s, Chalmers was a regular host of the Miss World contest on ITV, and also presented associated UK beauty pageants such as Miss United Kingdom. Chalmers presented BBC Radio 2's mid-morning show from 1990 to 1992, taking over from Ken Bruce, who returned to the programme following her departure in 1992.

In 2013, Chalmers took part in an episode of the BBC Two series Celebrity Antiques Road Trip, with her son, Mark. Her television appearances in later years included contributions to shows such as Good Morning Britain, and Lorraine. Chalmers also took part in Channel 5's Celebrity Taste of Italy.

In 2022, at the age of 86, Chalmers was appointed Heathrow Express's new chief smile officer, a role intended to keep travellers happy.

== Personal life and death ==
Chalmers was married to sports commentator Neil Durden-Smith from 1964 until her death. The couple had two children, including television presenter Mark Durden-Smith, and six grandchildren.

She was appointed an OBE in 1994.

Chalmers died of complications from Alzheimer's disease at her home on 21 May 2026, aged 90.

== Filmography ==
As herself
Year	Title	Notes
1956–1958	The Northern Scene	Presenter
1961–1965	Signpost	Presenter
1960	The Ken Dodd Show	1 episode
1962	Come Dancing	Compere; 1 episode
1962	It's a Square World	1 episode
1963–1967	Juke Box Jury	5 episodes
1964	Television Club	1 episode
1964	Viewpoint	1 episode
1965–1970	Seeing and Believing	Presenter
1966–1969	Know Your Onions	3 episodes
1968	Doddy for Christmas	Television film
1968	Theatre 625	1 episode
1970	Call My Bluff	3 episodes
1970	Not a Word	2 episodes
1973–1981	Good Afternoon!	Presenter
1974–2003	Wish You Were Here...?	Presenter
1974–2001	This Is Your Life	7 episodes
1974	The Top Secret Life of Edgar Briggs	1 episode
1975–1978	It's a Knockout	4 episodes
1978–1979	Celebrity Squares	2 episodes
1979–1985	Give Us a Clue	3 episodes
1979–1985	Miss World	Presenter
1980	Night of One Hundred Stars	Television film
1981	Family Fortunes	1 episode
1981	It'll Be Alright on the Night	1 episode
1981	The Generation Game	1 episode
1981–1982	The Pyramid Game	2 episodes
1981–1983	Punchlines	5 episodes
1981–2002	Blankety Blank	5 episodes
1983	An Audience with Kenneth Williams	Television special
1983	Octopussy: The Royal Premiere	Television special
1985	A View to a Kill: The Royal Premiere	Television special
1986	Cinderella: The Shoe Must Go On	Television film
1986	Looks Familiar	1 episode
1986	Duty Free	1 episode
1987	Des O'Connor Tonight	1 episode
1987	The Home Service	Presenter
1987	Wogan	1 episode
1988	Through the Keyhole	1 episode
1990	Open Air	1 episode
1990	What's My Line?	1 episode
1994	Surprise! Surprise!	1 episode
1993, 1995	Noel's House Party	1 episode
1997	Call My Bluff	2 episodes
1997	Smillie's People	1 episode
1998	So Graham Norton	1 episode
1998	Rex the Runt	Judith Poodle (voice); 2 episodes
1999	Heroes of Comedy	1 episode
1999	Wetty Hainthropp Investigates	Television short
2001	Bob Martin	1 episode
2003	Life Beyond the Box: Margo	Television film
2003	The All New Harry Hill Show	1 episode
2003	Wish You Were Here...? Today	1 episode
2003–2008	BBC Breakfast	2 episodes
2004	Back to the 70's	1 episode
2004	Saturday Brunch	1 episode
2004	The Best of 'So Graham Norton''	Guest
2004–2005	This Morning	4 episodes
2005	Castle in the Country	Reporter
2005–2006	The Paul O'Grady Show	Guest / Guest presenter; 2 episodes
2006	Another Audience with Shirley Bassey	Television special
2007	Children's TV on Trial	1 episode
2007	Points West	1 episode
2007	That's What I Call Television	1 episode
2007	The Strictly Come Dancing Story	Television film
2008	An Audience with Neil Diamond	Television special
2008	Comedy Classics	1 episode
2008–2009	Loose Women	2 episodes
2009	All Star Family Fortunes	1 episode
2010	30 Years of 'An Audience With...''	1 episode
2010	All Star Mr & Mrs	1 episode
2013	Celebrity Antiques Road Trip	1 episode
2016	Being Mavis Nicholson: TV's Greatest Interviewer	Television film
2016	Absolutely Fabulous: The Movie	Film role
2017	A Celebrity Taste of Italy	4 episodes
2017	Harry Hill's Alien Fun Capsule	1 episode
2018	Ooh You Are Awful: TV We Used to Love	Television film
2018	Top of the Box	1 episode
