= Mark Durden-Smith =

English TV presenter (born 1968)

- Born: Mark Durden-Smith; 1 October 1968 (age 57); Westminster, London, England
- Occupation: Television presenter
- Years active: 1993–present
- Spouse: Rachel Morse (m. 2004)
- Children: 3
- Parents: Neil Durden-Smith (father); Judith Chalmers (mother)

Mark Durden-Smith (born 1 October 1968) is an English television presenter best known for presenting ITV shows such as I'm a Celebrity...Get Me Out of Here! NOW! and This Morning Summer, Sky 1 shows such as The Match and Double or Nothing, and 5's rugby union coverage.

== Early life ==
Durden-Smith was educated at Radley College. He then studied at Durham University, where he graduated with a degree in Anthropology in 1991. At Durham he made one appearance as a full-back for the rugby team first XV and was a squad member for the 1991 tour to Zimbabwe.

== Career ==
After university Durden-Smith worked from 1993 to 1996 as a researcher for Clive Anderson Talks Back. He began his presenting career at the now-defunct London station Channel One, before moving on to front the rugby coverage at Sky Sports in August 1997.

He was one of the original presenters of Channel 4 breakfast show RI:SE, launched in April 2002 as a successor to The Big Breakfast, but was dismissed at the start of the following year as part of an ultimately failed revamp.

=== Sky ===
Durden-Smith has hosted the annual The Police Bravery Awards, The Match and the game show Double or Nothing, all for Sky 1.

=== ITV ===
Durden-Smith presented Package Holidays Undercover for ITV and Hell's Kitchen: Extra Portions for ITV2. It was announced in June 2007 that he would head a new ITV series, Wish You Were Here...? Now and Then, a 25-part series where Durden-Smith revisits destinations, originally visited by his mother and other presenters in the original series of Wish You Were Here...?, to see how much they have changed. From 2003 to 04 and 2006 through 2008, he presented I'm a Celebrity: Get Me out of Here! NOW!.

In 2010, Durden-Smith began presenting ITV's This Morning as a guest presenter, standing in for Phillip Schofield or Eamonn Holmes. He was a Friday presenter during This Morning Summer, usually alongside Jenni Falconer. Durden-Smith was a panelist on the 2011 series of 3@Three on ITV. The show aired on weekdays from 3pm. He was a regular news reviewer on the ITV lifestyle programme Lorraine. He took part in the ITV reality series All at Sea.

In 2013, he began presenting ITV's Aviva Premiership Rugby Highlights programme, replacing Craig Doyle and Martin Bayfield. In August 2015, Durden-Smith began presenting the daytime ITV game show Freeze Out, which aired for ten episodes.

=== Channel 5 ===
Durden-Smith presented Premiership Rugby programmes alongside David Flatman on Channel 5 until 2021, having signed a 4-year deal in 2017.

=== Amazon Prime Video ===
In 2021, Durden-Smith presented Amazon Prime Video's coverage of the Autumn Nations Series. He returned to present the coverage in 2022.

== Personal life ==
Mark is the son of Judith Chalmers and sports commentator Neil Durden-Smith. He married Rachel Morse on 11 December 2004; the couple have three children.

== Filmography ==
- Package Holidays Undercover (2003) – Presenter, for ITV
- I'm a Celebrity... Get Me out of Here! Now (2003–2004, 2006–2008) – Co-presenter
- Junior Eurovision Song Contest: The British Final (2003) – Co-presenter
- Junior Eurovision Song Contest 2003 – Co-commentator
- Hell's Kitchen: Extra Portions (2004–2005) – Presenter, for ITV2
- Millionaire Manor (2005–2006) – Presenter, 14-part series on BBC One
- Wish You Were Here...? Now and Then (2007) – Presenter
- The Underdog Show (2008) – Co-presenter
- This Morning (2010–2011, 2013) – Guest presenter
- Lorraine (2010–2014) – Regular newspaper reviewer
- Odd One In (2010) – Guest
- All at Sea (2010) – Participant, ITV series
- 3@Three (2011) – Regular panellist
- The Chase: Celebrity Special (2011) – Contestant
- Celebrity Antiques Road Trip (2013) – Participant
- Aviva Premiership Rugby Highlights (2013–14) – Presenter
- Sport Relief's Top Dog (2014) – Guest team captain
- Pointless Celebrities: Sport Relief Special (2014) – Contestant
- Freeze Out (2015) – Presenter, 10-part series
