= STV2 =

Scottish local television network

- Country: United Kingdom
- Broadcast area: Aberdeen, Ayr, Dundee, Edinburgh, Glasgow
- Headquarters: Pacific Quay, Glasgow

Programming
- Language: English

Ownership
- Owner: STV Group plc
- Sister channels: STV

History
- Launched: 23 April 2017
- Replaced: STV Glasgow; STV Edinburgh
- Closed: 1 July 2018 (1 year, 69 days)
- Replaced by: That's TV Scotland

Links
- Website: stv.tv/stv2

Availability (at time of closure)

Terrestrial
- Freeview: Channel 8

Streaming media
- STV Player: Watch live
- .: Catch up (STV regions only)

STV2 was a British local television network in Scotland, operating five city-based TV licences serving Glasgow, Edinburgh, Dundee, Aberdeen and Ayr. It was owned and operated by STV Group plc.

Initially broadcast as two separate stations – STV Glasgow and STV Edinburgh – the launch of three local licences in Aberdeen, Dundee and Ayr led to the launch of a single networked service on 24 April 2017. In May 2018, it was announced that STV2 would shut down at the end of June 2018 as part of a strategic review. It closed on 30 June 2018.

== Overview ==
In January 2013, the broadcast regulator Ofcom announced STV had been awarded two licences to broadcast local TV services in the Glasgow and Edinburgh areas for a twelve-year period. The broadcaster pledged to run the channels in partnership with Glasgow Caledonian University and Edinburgh Napier University respectively.

Coinciding with a group-wide revamp, STV Glasgow began broadcasting at 6.30pm on Monday 2 June 2014, with the first edition of its flagship evening magazine programme, The Riverside Show. STV Edinburgh followed at 7pm on Monday 12 January 2015, launching with the first edition of The Fountainbridge Show.

In March 2015, STV won three further local TV licences for the Aberdeen, Dundee and Ayr areas under the working titles of Around Aberdeen, View from the Bridges and Ayrshire Today. No other bids were received for the three services.

The majority of STV2's programming was produced and broadcast from STV's headquarters at Pacific Quay in Glasgow. Unlike the main STV channel, where transmission originates in-house, playout and presentation were provided by Comux, the local TV multiplex operator, at its operations centre in Birmingham.

== Programming ==
The five local TV services under the STV2 banner carries a single schedule of networked programming.

STV News airs bespoke half-hour bulletins for STV2 at 1 pm and 10 pm alongside a simulcast of the Edinburgh edition of STV News at Six. The network's flagship news programme, STV News Tonight aired each weeknight at 7 pm and incorporated Scottish, UK and international news. The half-hour programme, presented by Halla Mohieddeen, was produced in partnership with ITN.

Non-news programmes for the channel included the early evening magazine Live at Five, Peter & Roughie's Football Show, Scottish Politics This Week, documentary series The People's History Show and chat shows including My Life in Ten Pictures and The Late Show with Ewen Cameron. Acquired programming included the Irish soap Fair City and Finnish drama Black Widows. Archive content included popular Scottish soap Take the High Road and crime drama Taggart.

=== List of programmes ===
- Black Widows
- Bodo
- Britain by Bike
- Fair City
- Gordon Ramsay's Ultimate Cookery Course
- Gordon Ramsay's Ultimate Home Cooking
- Jak and Eddie's Scottish Kitchen
- Julie and Jimmy's Hot Woks
- The Late Show with Ewen Cameron
- Liberty's Great American Cookbook
- Live at Five
- Medics of the Glen
- Murder at 9
- My Life in Ten Pictures
- Off the Beaten Track
- On Weir's Way with David Hayman
- The People's History Show
- Peter & Roughie's Football Show
- Peter & Roughie's Saturday Football Show
- Scottish Politics This Week
- STV News Tonight
- Taggart
- Take the High Road
- Take Me
- Royal Upstairs Downstairs
- Secret State
- Scotland's City Safari
- Weir's Way

== Closure ==
STV announced in May 2018 that STV2 would close at the end of the following month due to low viewership and anticipated competition from the BBC Scotland channel set to launch in February 2019. The closure of STV2 resulted in the loss of 25 jobs with a further 34 cut in a reorganisation of STV's news output. The channel's broadcasting licences were sold to That's Media, owners of the That's TV network of local television stations. STV2 closed on 1 July 2018 after midnight, and its replacement, That's TV Scotland, launched on 15 October 2018.
