= STV Glasgow =

Television station in Glasgow, Scotland

- Country: United Kingdom
- Broadcast area: Glasgow
- Headquarters: Pacific Quay, Glasgow

Programming
- Language: English
- Picture format: 576i (16:9 SDTV)

Ownership
- Owner: STV Group plc
- Sister channels: STV; STV Edinburgh

History
- Launched: 2 June 2014
- Closed: 23 April 2017
- Replaced by: STV2

Links
- Website: stv.tv/stv2

Availability

Terrestrial
- Freeview: Channel 8

STV Glasgow was a British local television station serving Glasgow and surrounding areas. The station was owned and operated by STV Group plc in partnership with Glasgow Caledonian University.

The channel was closed on Sunday 23 April 2017 and replaced by STV2, a semi-national network of local TV stations.

== History ==
STV were awarded local TV licences in January 2013 to operate two digital television channels, under the working titles of GTV and ETV, in Glasgow and Edinburgh respectively, for up to 12 years. Three other bids were made for the Glasgow licence by Glasgow TV, Made in Glasgow and Metro8 Glasgow.

The channel was run in partnership with Glasgow Caledonian University.

STV Glasgow launched at 6.30pm on Monday 2 June 2014, originally airing every day from midday until around midnight. The channel claimed to have reached over half a million viewers in its first month. Its sister station STV Edinburgh launched on 12 January 2015.

The channel extended its hours in March 2015, along with sister channel STV Edinburgh. The two city channels then shared the majority of programming, with most STV Glasgow productions also broadcast on its sister station.

On Monday 24 April 2017, with the launch of more STV City channels in Aberdeen, Ayr and Dundee, the network of services was merged and relaunched as STV2.

== Programming ==
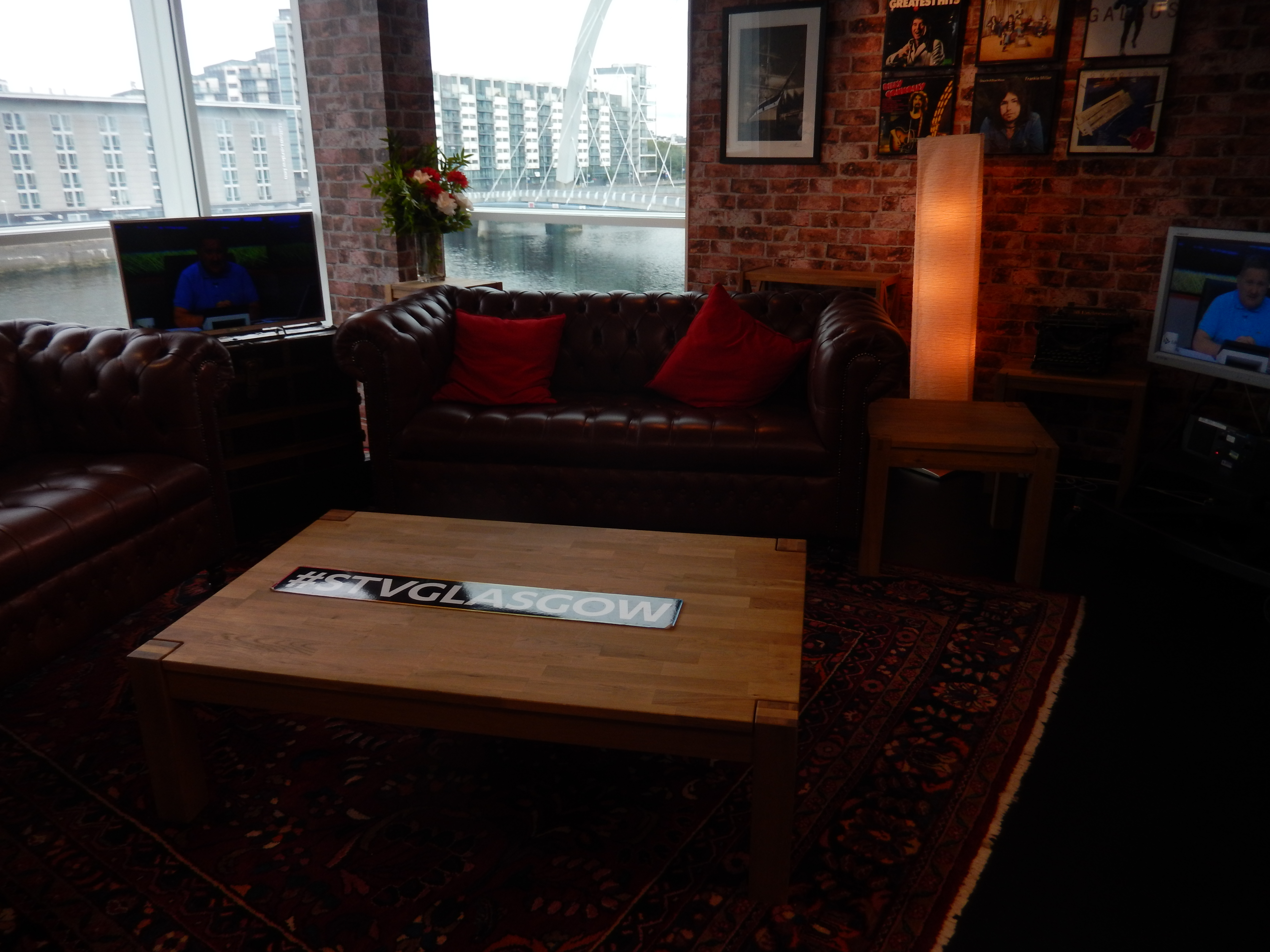
STV Glasgow studio at Pacific Quay

STV Glasgow aired a locally focused schedule of new, archived and imported programming, including daily magazine shows, an expanded STV News service, features, former STV programmes, documentaries and drama.

Non-news productions from the Glasgow studios included the early evening show, Live at Five, sports chat show Peter and Roughie's Football Show, interview series My Life in Ten Pictures and entertainment show Grass Roots Music.

STV Glasgow also aired archived drama series including Taggart, Take the High Road and Rebus alongside the acclaimed Polish World War II drama Czas honoru (Days of Honour) and the comedy drama series High Times. The station aimed to broadcast at least an hour a week of non-English language programming.
