= STV Group =

Scottish media company

STV Group plc
- Logo used since 2014
- Formerly: Scottish Television Limited (1957-1981); Scottish Television plc (1981-1996); Scottish Media Group plc (1996-2000); SMG plc (2000-2008)
- Type: Public
- Traded as: LSE: STVG
- Industry: Media
- Founded: 1957; 69 years ago (as Scottish Television)
- Headquarters: Glasgow, Scotland, UK
- Area served: Central and Northern Scotland
- Key people: Rufus Radcliffe (CEO); Paul Reynolds (Chairman)
- Products: Broadcasting; Television production
- Revenue: ▼£176.9 million (2025)
- Operating income: ▼£11.6 million (2025)
- Net income: ▼£(4.0) million (2025)
- Divisions: STV Studios
- Website: stvplc.tv

STV Group plc (formerly known as Scottish Television plc, Scottish Media Group plc and SMG plc) is a media company based in Glasgow, Scotland. Beginning as a television broadcaster in 1957, the company expanded into newspapers, advertising and radio; after completing a restructuring in 2010, STV Group is active in broadcast television, video-on-demand and television production. The company is a constituent of the FTSE SmallCap Index.

== History ==
=== Establishment and early broadcasting ===
SMG's last logo before rebrand

Scottish Television began broadcasting in August 1957. The company changed its name to Scottish Media Group in 1996 when it acquired Caledonian Publishing, owners of Glasgow-based newspapers The Herald and Evening Times (both of which have since been sold). It went on to acquire the ITV licence holder for the North of Scotland, Grampian Television, in June 1997. In August 1997 the company acquired a 15% stake in UTV, Northern Ireland. In 1999 it launched a new Sunday broadsheet newspaper, the Sunday Herald. The company was renamed "SMG plc" in 2000, by which time it had expanded further through the acquisitions of Primesight (outdoor advertising), Pearl & Dean and Ginger Media Group, which included Ginger Television and the original Virgin Radio UK radio station. Talks were also held which could have led to Border Television and Ulster Television being bought, but they came to nothing.

=== Granada acquisition ===
On 24 March 1999, Mirror Group sold its 18.6% stake in SMG to Granada. During the summer, the STV Group held talks about buying out the other shareholders in GMTV, with Disney believed to be keen on the idea; many city observers believed this was a defensive move to fend off a takeover bid from Granada. By September an agreement had been reached to acquire Guardian Media Group's 15% stake in GMTV for £20 million, but both Carlton and Granada objected to the deal. Guardian Media Group eventually sold its stake for £18m in January 2000, but STV Group only acquired 5% with the remaining 10% going to Carlton and Granada, resulting in each of STV Group, Carlton, Granada and Disney holding 25% of GMTV.

In September 1999, the company acquired a 37.4% stake in Heart of Midlothian F.C. for £8 million. A few days later the company unveiled its interim results with its pre-tax profits up 2 per cent to £24 million on a turnover of £111.2 million. In December 2000, the group acquired a 14.9% stake in Scottish Radio Holdings, in anticipation of a relaxation of radio ownership rules and within four months increased this to 27.7%. By 2004 the company sold their 27.8% stake in Scottish Radio Holdings to EMAP for £90 million in anticipation of consolidation in the radio market.

Flextech owner Telewest sold its 16.9% stake in STV Group to an investment bank for £45 million as part of their plan to raise funds to help clear off debt. Throughout 2003/2004 rumours appeared about the company being broken up, with its ITV interests being sold off in an attempt to wipe out its £380m debt and boost its balance sheet. However, the group instead sold the Herald newspapers and its stake in Scottish Radio Holdings. In late 2003 Northern Ireland's UTV, in partnership with venture capital group 3i and Scottish Radio Holdings, sought to acquire SMG for £400 million, but they withdrew the offer as they felt the share price was too high.

=== GMTV withdrawal ===
In September 2004, ITV plc purchased STV Group's 25% stake in GMTV for £31 million, after being given the go ahead from the Office of Fair Trading. SMG said "SMG are pulling out of GMTV because it did not want to hold a minority interest in someone else's media business".

Andrew Flanagan unexpectedly resigned as chief executive in July 2006. Although he helped create the company since 1998, his spell in charge will be remembered by many in the television industry as a period which saw a dramatic decline in the amount of programmes made by the company for transmission within Scotland alone.

Rob Woodward became the new chief executive in 2007, and started a major reconstruction of the group by instigating a sell-off of poorly performing assets, starting with Primesight being sold for £62m to a private equity firm. SMG said in a statement that the price GMT Communications Partners paid represented a "clear uplift" on offers previously received for Primesight. Primesight have been prosecuted a number of times for the display of advertisements without consent which is an offence under UK Planning Acts. The lack of consent for many of Primesight's displays is said to have reduced the selling price by up to £30 million.

Further major changes occurred when STV Group sold Virgin Radio to a group led by The Times of India on 31 May 2008.

=== STV Group plc ===
In June 2008, SMG plc announced plans to change its name to STV Group plc. The company said the proposed name change was to highlight its renewed focus on television, encompassing the STV Central and STV North franchises, as well as the company's TV production business.

This name change was approved at an extraordinary general meeting in September 2008, along with a new deal resulting in Pearl & Dean handling advertising for Showcase Cinemas, which meant that the Pearl & Dean titles would appear in just under half of UK cinema sites. The new STV Group branding was introduced on 1 October 2008.

By 2010, the group had sold off all non-television assets, including selling cinema advertising company Pearl & Dean for £1 to Image Ltd, a newly formed company backed by Empire Cinemas director Thomas Anderson, with STV still recouping £9.1m from the business due to a 2010 payment from Vue Cinemas.

=== Merger proposals ===
In September 2006, STV Group (then SMG) officially rejected a merger offer from Northern Irish ITV franchise holder UTV. The merger approach would have given SMG shareholders a 52% stake in the combined company. The Scottish group said its board had examined a revised merger proposal from UTV, but did not believe it reflected the value of the company.

In 2006, ITV plc considered making an offer for STV Group, according to The Mail on Sunday. The newspaper quoted an ITV source as saying John Cresswell, acting chief executive at the broadcaster, was most interested in the group's television franchises, but that any deal would have been for the whole group. SMG warned that its 2006 profit would be materially behind expectations, sending its shares down more than a quarter in value to a 15-year low.

On 10 January 2007, SMG and UTV agreed details of a merger, including a revised share split between the two. UTV would own 54% of the group, with SMG owning the remaining 46%.

This merger was finally rejected at the end of February 2007, and a new board and management team were introduced at SMG shortly afterwards.

=== Relationship with ITV plc ===
In September 2009, ITV plc announced it was to launch legal proceedings against STV for a claimed unpaid debt of £38 million from network programming contributions, following STV's practice of dropping a number of network programmes on the STV franchise. At the same time, STV claimed it was also following procedures against ITV plc, for up to £40 million owed to STV under its advertising sales agreements. Both claims were settled by mutual agreement between the two broadcasters in April 2011. The agreement included a financial settlement of £18m paid by STV to ITV.

== Studios ==
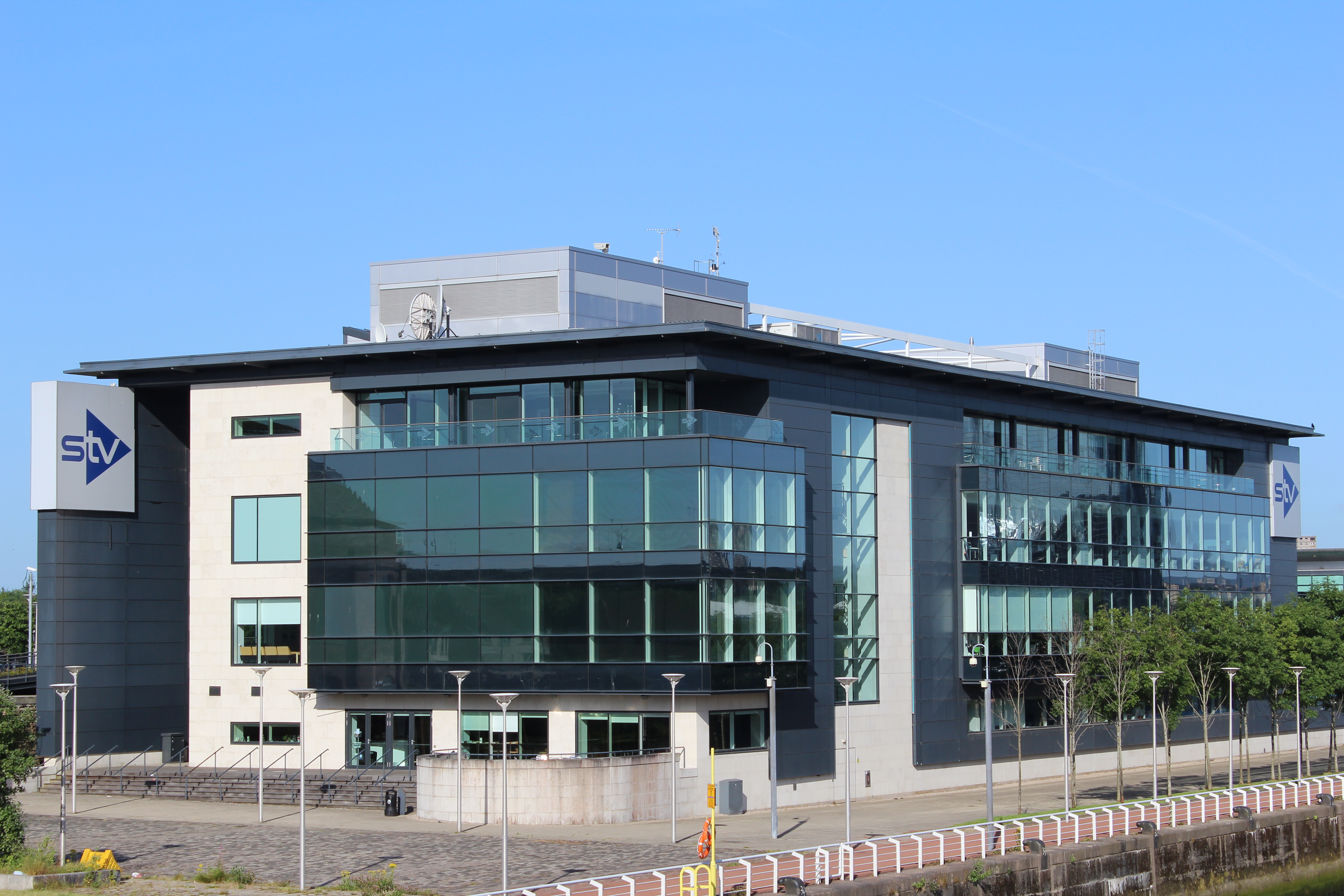
STV HQ & studios, Glasgow

STV Group's headquarters in Glasgow are at Pacific Quay, a 2006 development next to the River Clyde, alongside BBC Scotland's studios and the Glasgow Science Centre. STV Group's Aberdeen studios moved to a new purpose-built site in the city's Tullos area in 2003, from their previous location (a converted tram shed), which they had occupied since Grampian launched in 1961.

== Television ==
=== STV ===
STV Group plc owns two Scottish ITV licences: Scottish Television, which covers Central Scotland, and Grampian Television, covering Northern Scotland. On 2 March 2006, it was announced that Scottish Television would revert to using its former brand name of "STV", which it previously used from the start of colour broadcasting in 1969 until 30 August 1985, and which the station was still informally known as in parts of Scotland. Scottish Television became known as STV Central. At the same time, Grampian Television would also become known as STV North, with the one main identity of STV serving the two licences. The rebrand took place on 30 May 2006.

==== Other channels ====
The former SMG plc ran its own digital channel, S2, throughout the Scottish and Grampian ITV regions. S2, which aired on the Digital Terrestrial platform, was launched on 30 April 1999 and was replaced by ITV2 just over two years later – as part of a deal with ITV Digital – on 27 July 2001.

Sky Scottish was a satellite television channel operating on the analogue Sky TV service between 1 November 1996 and 31 May 1998. The service was a joint venture between British Sky Broadcasting and SMG.

A high-definition channel, STV HD, launched on 6 June 2010.

On 11 January 2013, STV were awarded two local TV licences by Ofcom to operate digital terrestrial television channels in Glasgow and Edinburgh for up to 12 years. The two channels, STV Glasgow and STV Edinburgh, were to be delivered in partnership with Glasgow Caledonian University and Edinburgh Napier University respectively. STV Glasgow launched on 2 June 2014, and STV Edinburgh launched on 12 January 2015. In March 2015, STV were awarded local licences for the Aberdeen, Ayr and Dundee areas. In April 2017, STV Glasgow and STV Edinburgh were re-branded as STV2. Just over a year later in May 2018, STV announced that it would be closing STV2 on 30 June 2018.

== Radio ==
STV Group launched a Scotland-wide radio station named STV Radio on 6 January 2026. The station is available via streaming on STV Player and smart speakers, and features a breakfast show hosted by former Greatest Hits Radio presenters Ewen Cameron and Cat Harvey. The station is also available on DAB and DAB+ in Central Scotland, North East of Scotland, Tayside, Ayrshire, Inverness, Moray and the Highlands.

== Production ==
=== STV Studios ===
STV Studios (previously STV Productions, SMG Productions) forms part of the network television production arm of STV Group plc, producing drama, factual, entertainment and children's output from its bases in Glasgow and London for all UK terrestrial networks as well as key satellite and cable channels.

=== Ginger Productions ===
Ginger Productions (founded by the presenter Chris Evans), alongside STV Productions, is part of the network production arm of STV Group plc. Based in Waterhouse Square in London, its output focuses on Entertainment and Factual Entertainment. Ginger was acquired as part of SMG's acquisition of the Ginger Media Group in 2000.

=== STV Creative ===
STV Creative is the company's commercial production division, based in Glasgow.

== See also ==
- STV Children's Appeal
- Television in Scotland
