= STV Edinburgh =

- Country: United Kingdom
- Broadcast area: Edinburgh
- Headquarters: Fountainbridge, Edinburgh

Programming
- Language: English
- Picture format: 576i (16:9 SDTV)

Ownership
- Owner: STV Group plc
- Sister channels: STV; STV Glasgow

History
- Launched: 12 January 2015
- Closed: 23 April 2017
- Replaced by: STV2

Links
- Website: stv.tv/stv2

Availability (at time of closure)

Terrestrial
- Freeview: Channel 8

STV Edinburgh was a British local television channel based in Edinburgh which launched on 12 January 2015. It was owned and operated by STV Group plc in partnership with Edinburgh Napier University. The channel was closed on Sunday 23 April 2017 and replaced by STV2, a semi-national network of local TV stations which itself closed on 1 July 2018.

== History ==
STV were awarded local TV licences in January 2013 to operate two digital television channels, under the working titles of GTV and ETV, in Glasgow and Edinburgh respectively, for up to 12 years.

Three other bids were made for the licence by Edinburgh News Network, Made in Edinburgh and Metro8 Edinburgh.

The channel was run in partnership with Edinburgh Napier University.

STV Edinburgh launched at 7pm on Monday 12 January 2015, originally airing every day from midday until around midnight. Its sister station, STV Glasgow, began broadcasting on Monday 2 June 2014.

The channel soon extended its hours in March 2015. The two city channels then began to share the majority of programming, with most STV Edinburgh productions also broadcast on its sister station in Glasgow.

On Monday 24 April 2017, with the launch of STV City channels in Aberdeen, Ayr and Dundee, the network was merged and relaunched as STV2.

== Programming ==
STV Edinburgh aired a locally focused schedule of new, archived and imported programming, including a daily magazine show, an expanded STV News service, features, former STV programmes, a morning kids block known as ‘Weans World’, documentaries and drama. The main non-news productions from the Edinburgh studios were the nightly magazine show, The Late Show and coverage of the Edinburgh Festival.

STV Edinburgh also aired archived drama series including Taggart, Take the High Road and Rebus alongside the acclaimed Polish World War II drama Czas honoru (Days of Honour) and the comedy drama series High Times. The station pledged to broadcast at least an hour a week of non-English language programming.
