= Sky Scottish =

Satellite television channel (1996–1998)

- Country: United Kingdom
- Broadcast area: Scotland

Ownership
- Owner: British Sky Broadcasting; SMG plc

History
- Launched: 1 November 1996
- Closed: 31 May 1998
- Replaced by: Sky Sports

Sky Scottish was a short-lived satellite television channel operating on the analogue service broadcasts between 6.00pm and 8.00pm.

== History ==
The service was a joint venture between British Sky Broadcasting and ITV franchise Scottish Television owners SMG plc, was aimed at Scots living outside Scotland who would not otherwise be able to receive Scottish-related programming, such as that also transmitted by Grampian or the BBC. It was announced in September 1996 and was initially set to broadcast two hours a day, with plans to expand to a four or six-hour window and to produce 450 hours of original content per year alongside expansion of its coverage to the United States and Australia. This was to be followed by pay-per-view coverage of the Scottish Premier League once Sky Digital went operational, which at the time, was expected to launch at the end of 1997. The channel launched on 1 November 1996, alongside The Computer Channel.

The station's main programmes included an extra edition of Scottish Television's regional news programme Scotland Today and episodes of Take the High Road from 1994. Celtic F.C.'s 1997 pre-season friendlies were shown on the channel. Scotsport was also shown on Sky Scottish, as well as spin-off show Extra Time, and there was also The Football Show presented by Jim Delahunt and Peter McGuire.

The channel had a small audience, but hoped to increase if satellite television penetration increased.

Despite BSkyB and SMG entering into a seven-year contract to run the service, it was closed down after 18 months. Its closure was explained as the channel having failed to meet its financial targets. Reports suggested that only The Ibrox Club Hour and The Celtic Park Hour, programmes relating to Rangers and Celtic football clubs, had attracted more than 10,000 viewers.

Speaking at the time about the channel's demise, the managing director of SMG Donald Emslie described the service as having "been a valuable learning experience" for his company. SMG's finance director, Gary Hughes, stated that the service had shown "it is very difficult to access a Scottish audience outside Scotland", but also that Scottish audiences wanted more home-grown programmes.
