= STV (TV channel) =

Television channel in Scotland

- Logo used since 2014

- Country: Scotland
- Broadcast area: Central and Northern Scotland
- Network: ITV
- Headquarters: Pacific Quay, Glasgow, Scotland

Programming
- Language: English
- Picture format: 1080i/1080p HDTV (Note: 1080p25 sometimes only on Freeview.) (downscaled to 576i for the SDTV feed)
- Timeshift service: STV +1

Ownership
- Owner: STV Group

History
- Launched: 30 May 2006; 20 years ago
- Replaced: Grampian Television (Northern Scotland); Scottish Television (Central Scotland)

Links
- Website: stv.tv

Availability

Terrestrial
- Freeview: Channel 3 (SD) (all regions); Channel 35 (+1) (Central West, North); Channel 103 (HD) (Central West)

Streaming media
- STV Player: Watch live (STV regions only); Watch live (+1) (STV regions only)

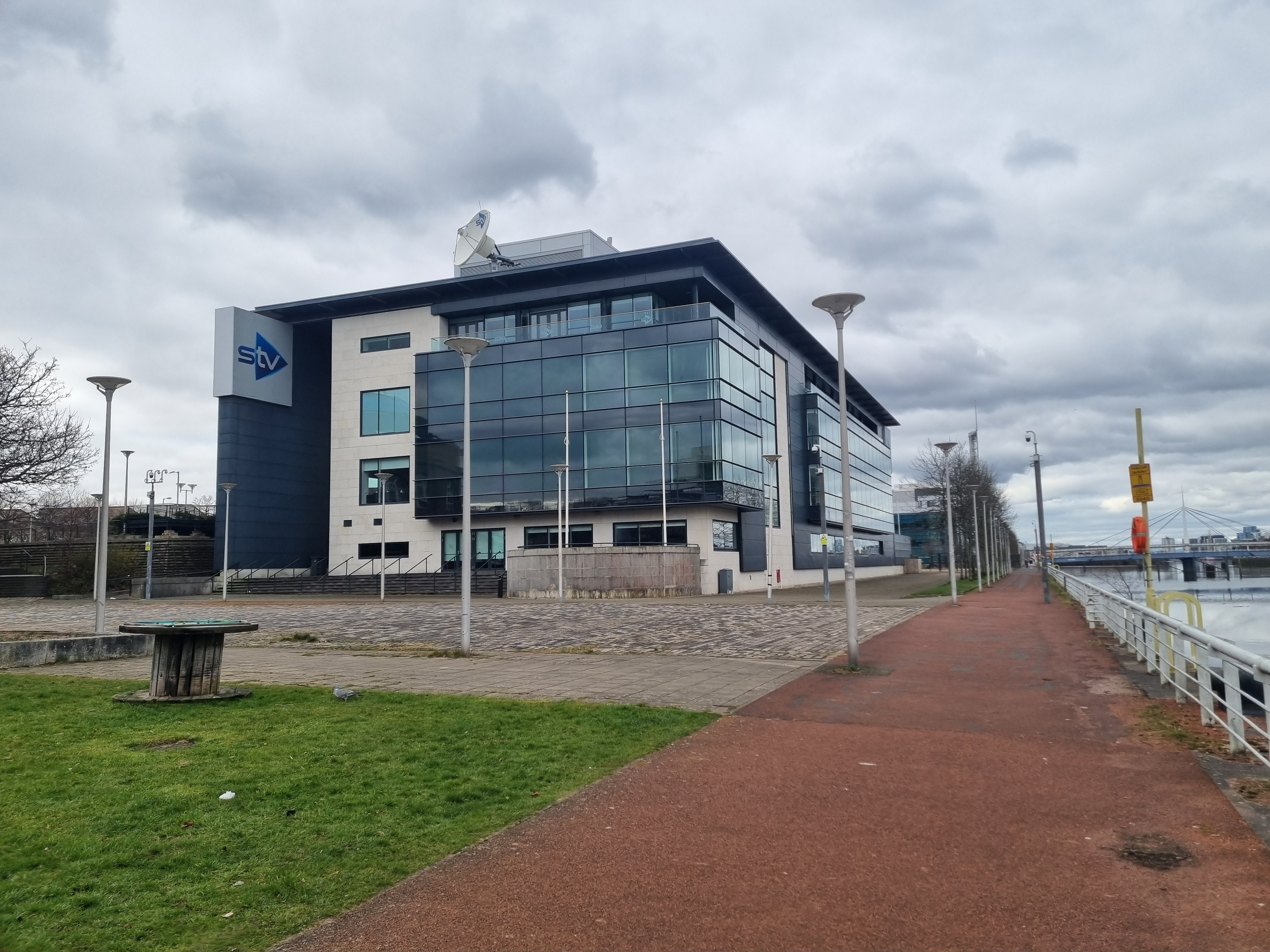
STV headquarters in Pacific Quay, Glasgow

STV is a Scottish free-to-air public broadcast television channel owned and operated by the STV Group. It is made up of the Central Scotland and Northern Scotland ITV public broadcaster licences, formerly known as Scottish Television (now legally STV Central Ltd) and Grampian Television (now legally STV North Ltd) respectively.

The STV brand refers to the on-air name used by Scottish Television for much of its history - notably in the 1970s and early 1980s. This brand remained in conversational use amongst the local public afterwards.

The modern STV brand was adopted on Tuesday 30 May 2006 replacing both franchises' previous identities. The sense of continuity in the name was demonstrated when STV celebrated its 60th birthday in 2017, with special programmes broadcast on STV itself and STV2.

STV is the sole independent member of the Channel 3 network. STV also carries their own branding and presentation, with ITV1 branding and presentation being carried during ITV News and ITV Breakfast programmes.

== History ==
On 2 March 2006, it was announced by SMG plc (now 'STV Group plc') that Scottish Television would revert to the brand name of 'STV', used from the start of colour broadcasting in 1969 until 30 August 1985, and which the station was still informally known as. At the same time, Grampian Television would also become known as STV North. The new-look branding was launched on 30 May 2006.

In January 2007, the station launched separate news services for the East and West of the STV Central region, initially as a five-minute opt out within the 6:00pm edition of Scotland Today on weeknights.

=== 2010s ===
Regional news coverage was expanded again in May 2011 with the launch of separate half-hour editions of STV News at Six for the East and West, and localised late night news bulletins each weeknight.

STV were awarded local TV licences in January 2013 to operate two digital television channels in Glasgow and Edinburgh respectively, for up to 12 years. STV Glasgow launched on Monday, 2 June 2014 with an expanded schedule of local news, features and entertainment programming. STV Edinburgh launched on 12 January 2015. The two channels were later closed and merged with three other local TV licences to form a new national network, STV2, in April 2017. Existing regional news bulletins continued to air on the main STV Central service.

In June 2018, the Edinburgh-based bulletins were axed and replaced with shorter opt-outs within a Central Scotland edition of STV News at Six, co-anchored from the Glasgow and Edinburgh studios.

==== Withdrawal of networked output ====
In July 2009, STV announced that it was withdrawing some networked programmes such as The Bill, Doc Martin, Midsomer Murders, Poirot, Lewis and a number of other high-profile ITV network dramas from its schedules, instead preferring to concentrate on programming made within Scotland. The practice of dropping networked shows had been in operation for other programmes since November 2008 when STV announced it would opt out of programmes they claimed were not performing well in their broadcast region, including Sharpe's Peril, Al Murray's Happy Hour, Moving Wallpaper, Benidorm and The Alan Titchmarsh Show.

ITV's coverage of the FA Cup was also dropped, with England matches and highlights programmes also withdrawn. The vacated football slots would be filled by the regular programme line-up, as well as films or special events, with one such example being the first debate in the 2011 Scottish Parliament election airing against a friendly between England and Ghana at Wembley on 29 March 2011. If an FA Cup game went to extra time or penalties, STV would add additional filler programming until it was time to re-join the ITV network.

ITV plc claimed that STV were in breach of their network agreements by making this decision and sued STV for £38 million. STV launched its own legal action against ITV plc, claiming the company was owed money and unhappy about promotional advertising of their services. The then executive chairman of ITV plc, Michael Grade claimed his company was the "victim" in the ongoing dispute.

Amid many protests, the company's chief executive Rob Woodward admitted in December 2009 that STV had made a 'major mistake' by dropping some of the networked dramas and replacing them in some cases with imported output, repeats and films. The company pledged to continue with its plan to produce more regional programming and opt out of networked output with further plans announced in August 2010.

On 27 April 2011, ITV plc and STV Group plc settled their legal dispute, with the former receiving £18 million from STV. The £18 million consists of a £7.2 million cash payment payable in 2011 and £10.8 million either in programme rights at the end of the year or cash, as adjusted, depending on further discussions with ITV plc. The programming rights payment is capped at a maximum of £15 million. In addition, STV will receive £2.4 million of credit for programme opt outs in 2011. STV said it believed it was in the best interests of shareholders to end the long period of uncertainty. The parties have agreed the basis of a more collaborative relationship for the future.

In March 2012, a deal was announced between ITV and the other Channel 3 licence holders which would transform its commercial relationship with them after the broadcasters negotiated new Channel 3 networking arrangements. The deal would see STV and UTV become "affiliates" of the network, meaning they would pay an up-front fee for the rights to broadcast ITV content. At the time, the licence holders paid a percentage of the Channel 3 network costs based on their share of qualifying revenue. On 23 August 2012 STV confirmed the new network agreement with ITV was in operation.

=== Ofcom investigation ===
In March 2010, The Daily Telegraph reported that Ofcom would launch an investigation over claims that STV allowed the Scottish Government to influence its schedules and replace networked series with Scottish-based programmes. An Ofcom report released four months later cleared STV of allowing political interference within feature series, but 18 short social action programmes were found to have been influenced too closely by sponsorship from Government agencies and initiatives.

== Programming ==
The two licences still produce regional programmes, although the only difference between them is the respective news programmes: STV News broadcasts separate bulletins to Northern Scotland (including an opt-out for the Tayside area) and Central Scotland (including an opt-out for the East of the region). There is no "STV South" as Southern Scotland is part of the ITV Border region owned by ITV plc.

Emphasising the fact that STV is essentially one channel across the two regions, there is a single director of channels (Bobby Hain – former managing director of Scottish Television), and a single head of news (Linda Grimes Douglas). Terms in the renewed licences for both STV Central and STV North also mean that regional non-news programmes are shared (and identically scheduled) across both licences.

Today, news and current affairs forms the bulk of STV's regular programming on Channel 3, which includes the topical analysis programme Scotland Tonight. The company formerly produced many Gaelic programmes, some of which are now shown on the Gaelic-language channel, BBC Alba, including Speaking our Language and Machair. On a network scale, one of STV's most famous exports was the long-running crime drama Taggart, set in Glasgow.

=== News ===
- STV News at Six (2009–present)

=== Current affairs ===
- Scotland Tonight (2011–present)

=== Sport ===
- Scotsport (1957–2008)
- STV Rugby (2009–2012)
- STV Sports Centre (2010–2011)

=== Features and documentaries ===
- The Five Thirty Show (2008–09)
- The Hour (2009–11)

=== Entertainment ===
- Postcode Challenge (2007–2011)
- Moviejuice (2000–2012)
- The Cash Machine (2019)
- Win Cash Live (2015)

=== Children's ===
- wknd@stv (2009)

== Studios ==
=== STV Central ===
The STV studios in Glasgow were originally located in the former Theatre Royal in the Cowcaddens area of the city. The first programme broadcast by STV from the Theatre Royal studios was This is Scotland on 31 August 1957. In 1974, the company sold the Theatre Royal to Scottish Opera for conversion back to a full theatre and national opera house and moved into custom-built studios next door. The association with Cowcaddens ended in July 2006 when the station moved to new, smaller studios in Pacific Quay, alongside the Glasgow Science Centre.

In Edinburgh, STV converted the Gateway Theatre in Leith Walk into colour studios during the mid-late 1960s – a facility which proved especially useful in 1969 when a fire gutted studio A at the Theatre Royal, killing a fireman.

The Edinburgh studios later became a permanent production centre for Take the High Road before being closed in the early 1990s to save costs. A smaller news and advertising operation was established at George Street in the city centre, before moving to premises at Fountainbridge in 2012, from where regional news bulletins and the short-lived STV Edinburgh channel originated. In 2024, the Edinburgh studio was closed before moving again to Queensferry Road the following year.

=== STV North ===
STV North's Aberdeen headquarters moved to new smaller studios in the city's Tullos area in June 2003, vacating a converted tram depot that had been used since Grampian Television's launch in September 1961. Expansions to the Queen's Cross complex were made in 1983 and 1987 – the former as part of a £5 million investment into the company's technical facilities.

Around the time of the station's launch, Grampian also established premises in Dundee, later moving to Albany House in 1980 and Harbour Chambers in 1998. In April 2008, a new Dundee studio for local news and advertising operations was opened in the Seabraes area of the city, before moving again to offices at the Dundee Technology Park in 2025.

Grampian opened a base for local Highlands & Islands newsgathering in Inverness in 1983, situated in Huntly Street, which has since re-located to Stoneyfield Business Park. A studio complex in Stornoway was opened in 1993 to accommodate the expansion of the station's Scots Gaelic programming production. The studios closed in 2000 following the axing of the Gaelic news service, Telefios, but are now part of MG Alba which took over the site as its headquarters.

Grampian also established secondary studios in Edinburgh during the late 1960s from where some of the station's light entertainment programming was produced. The studios were closed in 1969.

== Subsidiary channels ==
=== STV HD ===
On 21 April 2010, STV Group plc. announced their intention to launch an HD channel on digital TV, before the 2010 World Cup. The station launched on 6 June 2010, initially broadcasting on Freeview channel 51, from the Black Hill, Keelylang Hill and Bressay transmitters, and now broadcasts from all post-digital switchover transmitters in its coverage area. STV HD was also made available on Virgin Media channel 113 in STV's transmission area soon after the launch of Freeview. The channel follows the launch of ITV1 HD, which became available on 2 April 2010 to viewers in the Scottish borders (who are served by ITV Border), England and Wales. STV Group plc. had been in talks with BSkyB, Freesat and the ITV Network with a view to making STV HD available via Sky and Freesat soon after the channels' initial launch. A test version of the channel was available free-to-air via satellite, but had to be manually tuned as it was not included on either the Sky or Freesat EPGs.

In September 2013, STV announced via Twitter that STV HD will be available for the first time on the Sky and Freesat from April 2014, nearly four years after first launching the channel on Freeview and Virgin Media. STV HD was added to Freesat and Sky on 28 April 2014.

Currently, STV HD is delivered across four transmission areas: North, West, East and Tayside. Only the North and West regions are broadcast Free-to-Air, the other two are Free-to-View and encrypted, and require a Viewing Card to watch them. The reason has to do with how those other two regions are broadcast on a pan-European satellite beam, which if broadcast unencrypted would potentially lead to licensing issues.

=== STV +1 ===
On 4 January 2011, Freeview announced details for the launch of ITV1 +1, together with the possibility that both STV and UTV would launch their own timeshift services, STV +1 and UTV +1 in Scotland and Northern Ireland respectively. STV later confirmed that it would launch STV +1 at 8 pm on 11 January 2011. The channel is available to Freeview viewers on channel 35 and Virgin Media cable customers on channel 114.

The timeshift channel STV +1 has been replaced with the micro Channel 3 region serving the Dundee area on satellite. STV +1 had been available on satellite till then, but not carried on either Sky EPG or Freesat channel guides.

There are two regional variations of STV +1 on Freeview and Virgin. One for North and one for Central Scotland. The North service shows Aberdeen-based news and commercials and the Central service carries the West region news bulletins and commercials.

STV +1 is available to stream on STV Player on various platforms.

== Regions ==
Map of the four STV subregions

STV serves central and northern Scotland. Within STV, Scotland is split into two regions and four sub-regions. Networked and regional programming is the same in both regions, apart from regional news and advertising. Within both regions, there are further opt-outs providing sub-regional news and commercials.

STV North (formerly Grampian Television) is based in Aberdeen and serves Northern Scotland. The main news programme serving the area is the North edition of STV News at Six, alongside short regional bulletins (STV News/Good Morning Scotland) on weekdays. The main 6 pm programme on weeknights includes local opt-outs for the North East and Highlands & Islands and Tayside and North East Fife). The two sub-regions also receive separate commercials.

STV Central (formerly Scottish Television) is based at the STV Group headquarters in Glasgow and serves Central Scotland. The main news programme serving the area is the Central edition of STV News at Six, alongside short regional bulletins (STV News/Good Morning Scotland) on weekdays. The main 6pm programme on weeknights includes local opt-outs for the West and East of the region. The Glasgow newsroom also produces pan-regional bulletins for the North and Central regions at weekends.

Altogether, the regions and sub-regions serve a population of 4,993,590.

- STV North (pop: 1,309,110):
  - STV Aberdeen (pop: 827,390) – Aberdeen, Aberdeenshire, Highland (except Lochaber), Moray, na h-Eileanan Siar, Orkney and Shetland
  - STV Dundee (pop: 481,720) – Angus, Dundee, North East Fife, Perth and Kinross
- STV Central (pop: 3,684,480):
  - STV Edinburgh (pop: 1,191,030) – Clackmannanshire, East Lothian, Edinburgh, Fife (except North East Fife), Midlothian and West Lothian
  - STV Glasgow (pop: 2,493,450) – Argyll and Bute, East Ayrshire, East Dunbartonshire, East Renfrewshire, Falkirk, Glasgow, Inverclyde, Lochaber, North Ayrshire, North Lanarkshire, Renfrewshire, Stirling, South Ayrshire, South Lanarkshire, West Dunbartonshire.
- The areas of Dumfries and Galloway and the Scottish Borders are currently served by ITV Border.

On 25 September 2025, STV announced it would seek permission from OFCOM to replace its two regional news services. Subject to regulatory approval, separate news programmes for the North would be replaced with a pan-regional programme covering both STV licence areas from Glasgow, with the Aberdeen studios closing. According to chief executive Rufus Radcliffe, the company is also seeking to end its sub-regional opt out bulletins for Tayside and Edinburgh.

== Presentation ==
=== 2006 ===
The celebrity look remained until 2006, when the Scottish and Grampian names were traded in for one unified look: STV. The first ident package featured an elongated blue 'S', with scenes of Scottish people in various locations passing around the 'S' from person to person in differing scenes, until one person places the S in the centre of the screen.

=== 2009 ===
An updated look was introduced on 23 March 2009, consisting of a picture postcard scene which would flip over to the right to reveal another theme. This flipping increases in pace and as the camera pulls back before the STV logo forms against a gradient blue background.

=== 2014 ===
On 2 June 2014, STV's logo was given a slight update. The logo is now 3D, and the white "tv" is now situated on a gradient blue triangle while light blue curves appear on the 3 sides. The "S" colour was changed to gradient light blue.

== Online presence ==
stv.tv was first launched in May 2006, with the merger of Scottish TV and Grampian TV, both becoming "STV". The first incarnation of the website was simply the old Scottish TV website with the new STV logo and some new colours, whilst work was ongoing behind the scenes to launch a brand-new site, with new features.

Website builder, Dog Digital helped launch the new-look site in July 2006, with the aim of being Scotland’s main source of online information and entertainment, targeting a wide Scottish audience, with a younger market bias. Dog's remit had been to devise, deliver and develop a strategic digital marketing plan for the new online channel, including the design and integration of the new brand, navigation, and digital marketing in the form of a sizeable online campaign which would be activated to raise awareness of the new online channel. Along with the expected News, Sport, Weather and Programme pages, the site also had other stand-alone sections: stvbingo.tv, stvdate.tv and stvout.tv. STV later took interest in other classified sites, including money-saving and consumer website, PeoplesChampion.com and SmartyCars.com, a car-selling and motoring site. All of these stand-alone sites would later close, one by one.

STV began overhauling the website in August 2008, with the launch of their online catch-up service, stv.tv/video, developed by online video specialists, Brightcove. Over the coming months, the various sections of the site were updated with the new layout, and more programme pages were created, including for shows from the ITV Network.

In early 2009. STV launched its new online classified recruitment service, stvjobs.com. The site was supported by a multi-million pound media campaign including TV, Radio, Cinema, Online, Direct and Outdoor Advertising. The website closed in 2013.

In July 2009, the Video section of the site was relaunched as "STV Player", with added functionality, including parental controls and TV schedules.

STV Casino, in partnership with NetPlay TV, was launched on air and online in September 2009, and closed February 2010. The following year, STV launched another casino website, STV Live Casino in July 2011. This site was also closed down.

STV Holidays was launched in 2011, in partnership with Barrhead Travel. The website would later be rebranded as "ScottishPassport.com", to accompany the STV series, before closing down altogether.

STV Local, an initiative which aimed to create a network of hyper-local websites across Scotland, was launched in June 2011. The first areas to launch were Airdrie, Bellshill, Coatbridge, Cumbernauld, Motherwell and Wishaw. The service was rolled out across the whole of Scotland over the following two years. The local services were closed in July 2013, before the launch of dedicated websites for the cities of Aberdeen, Dundee, Edinburgh and Glasgow later that year. The initiative was then quietly dropped, with the City websites redirecting to their relevant sections of the STV News website.

In October 2016, after the success of the STV Children's Appeal, the company launched The Scottish Children’s Lottery. The Scottish Children’s Lottery operated independently of STV in accordance with the requirements of the licences from the UK Gambling Commission. The lottery was sold to MBC ELM Limited in 2021.

In mid-2017, STV Player was made the homepage of stv.tv, with the small News and Competitions sections on the homepage removed, with just a link to those pages at the header and footer of the page.

== See also ==
- Television in Scotland
- Scottish Broadcasting Commission
- Sky Scottish
- S2
- STV2
- The current Channel 3 services in the rest of the United Kingdom:
  - ITV1
  - UTV
