= Timeline of television in Scotland =

This is a timeline of television in Scotland.

== 1950s ==
- 1952
  - 14 March – Television becomes available in Scotland for the first time following the switching on of the Kirk o'Shotts transmitting station.
  - 17 August – The Kirk o'Shotts transmitter begins broadcasting at full power after its main high-powered transmitters are switched on.
- 1953
  - No events.
- 1954
  - No events.
- 1955
  - 23 April – The Scottish Cup Final is broadcast live on television for the first time.
- 1956
  - The ITV franchise for Central Scotland franchise is awarded to Scottish Television from three applications.
- 1957
  - 16 August – Television comes to the Moray Firth area following the switching on of the Rosemarkie transmitting station.
  - 30 August – BBC Scotland launches a weekday five-minute news bulletin and a Saturday teatime sports round-up.
  - 31 August
    - At 5:30pm, Scottish Television starts broadcasting.
    - The Black Hill transmitting station comes into service for the launch of Scottish. Later this becomes the main transmitter for all channels in the area, replacing Kirk o'Shotts which stops radiating television signals in 1985 when the 405-line television system is switched off.
  - 18 September – Scottish launches a sports programme called Sports Desk which was soon renamed Scotsport. The programme would be broadcast for the next fifty years.
- 1958
  - 7 May – First broadcast of the BBC variety show The White Heather Club which aired until 1968.
  - 22 December – Television expands to the far north of Scotland following the switching on of the Orkney transmitter.
- 1959
  - No events.

== 1960s ==
- 1960
  - August – The ITV franchise for North East Scotland is awarded to Grampian Television, from seven applications.
  - The ITV franchise for the English-Scottish Border region is awarded to Border Television. There had been one other applicant – Solway Television.
- 1961
  - 11 January – North of Scotland Television Ltd changes its name to Grampian Television.
  - 1 September – Border Television goes on the air and at around the same time the Selkirk transmitting station is brought into service to provide television signals to south east Scotland.
  - 30 September – At 2:45pm, Grampian Television goes on the air and at around the same time, the Durris transmitting station is brought into service to provide television signals in the Aberdeen area and the surrounding coastal areas.
- 1962
  - No events.
- 1963
  - No events.
- 1964
  - 20 April – The existing BBC channel is renamed BBC1 Scotland.
  - 15 August – Scottish launches Scotsport Results to provide viewers with a round-up of the day's Scottish football. It is broadcast on Saturday teatimes at around 5pm during the football season.
- 1965
  - The chairman of the Independent Television Authority Charles Hill pays a visit to STV's Glasgow studios during which he observed an edition of the popular daytime entertainment show The One O'Clock Gang. He was so appalled by it, he personally axed the programme with the words "My God, how long have you been getting away with this?".
- 1966
  - The Angus transmitting station is constructed by the ITA, bringing improved reception to the Dundee area.
  - BBC2 is broadcast in Scotland for the first time when transmissions of the channel commence from the Black Hill transmitter. The launch followed several months of Trade Test transmissions.
- 1967
  - Scottish Television retains its franchise, despite strong competition from a consortium led by the future BBC Director General Alasdair Milne. Lord Thomson is forced by the ITA to reduce his stake in the station from 80% to 25%, effectively ending the company's standing as a subsidiary of the Thomson Group.
- 1968
  - 1 April – Debut of BBC Scotland's national news programme Reporting Scotland.
  - August – A technicians strike forces ITV off the air for several weeks although management manage to launch a temporary ITV Emergency National Service with no regional variations.
- 1969
  - October – Scottish starts broadcasting in colour and marks the occasion by opening new secondary studios at the Gateway Theatre in Edinburgh.
  - 3 November – A major fire badly damages Scottish's Glasgow studios.

== 1970s ==
- 1970
  - No events.
- 1971
  - 1 September – Border begins broadcasting in colour.
  - 30 September – Grampian Television marks its tenth birthday by commencing colour transmissions.
  - The Craigkelly transmitting station begins carrying all three channels in UHF, bringing improved reception to the Edinburgh area. It had been constructed in 1968 to improve coverage of BBC2.
- 1972
  - Scottish Television begins the construction of its new purpose-built complex in Glasgow, at Cowcaddens.
  - 11 September – Scottish launches Scotland Today. However, the programme is only broadcast for ten months each year.
- 1973
  - No events.
- 1974
  - 12 December – The official opening of Scottish Television's new studios by Princess Alexandra takes place.
- 1975
  - August – Debut of BBC Scotland's sports strand Sportscene.
- 1976
  - 3 April – The first edition of BBC Scotland's rural affairs series Landward is broadcast. It was shown on Sunday lunchtimes as an opt-out as the rest of the UK received Farming and from 1988, Countryfile.
- 1977
  - No events.
- 1978
  - Scotland Today’s annual Summer break is scrapped and consequently, the programme is now on the air all year round.
  - Grampian's regional news magazine programme Grampian Today extends from three to five nights a week. This is made possible by the commencement of the usage of Electronic News Gathering cameras.
  - Debut of the BBC Scotland series The Beechgrove Garden.
- 1979
  - 10 August – The ten week ITV strike forces all of Scotland's ITV companies off the air. The strike ends on 24 October.

== 1980s ==
- 1980
  - 7 January – Grampian Today is relaunched as North Tonight as part of an effort to reflect northern Scotland as a whole. The new programme is marked by the opening of a new studio in Dundee. 1980 also sees Grampian introduces weekday lunchtime and closedown news bulletins, called North News and North Headlines respectively.
  - 19 February – The first edition of the soap opera Take the High Road is broadcast. It would run until 2003.
  - 1 December – BBC Scotland carries out a one-week experiment in breakfast television. It is a simulcast of BBC Radio Scotland's breakfast show Good Morning Scotland.
  - 28 December – The IBA announces the results of the 1980 franchise round, revealing that all three of Scotland's ITV broadcasters have retained their franchises.
- 1981
  - 8 September – BBC One Scotland changes its name to BBC Scotland.
- 1982
  - No events.
- 1983
  - Grampian opens a studio in Inverness, thereby increasing its coverage of the Highlands and Islands areas.
  - 17 January – Breakfast Time, Britain's first breakfast show, launches on BBC1. The new service includes four opt-outs which allow BBC Scotland to broadcast its own news bulletin.
  - 1 February – ITV's breakfast television service TV-am launches. It is a UK-wide service and therefore contains no Scottish-specific content. Consequently, the three Scottish ITV companies begin their broadcast day at 9:25am.
  - 24 October – Following the launch of the BBC's new teatime news and current affairs series Sixty Minutes, Reporting Scotland is renamed Scotland Sixty Minutes.
- 1984
  - 30 July – Following the demise of Sixty Minutes, the title of BBC Scotland's regional news magazine reverts back to Reporting Scotland.
  - 8 October – Scotland Today is relaunched as a feature-led magazine format with the news relegated to brief summaries before and after the programme.
- 1985
  - 4 January – The last 405-line transmissions take place in Scotland and the switch-off sees the ending of television signals being radiated from the Kirk o' Shotts transmitting station.
  - Grampian and Scottish launch computer-generated idents, doing so in April and August respectively.
- 1986
  - 20 October – Following considerable criticism, including from the Independent Broadcasting Authority, the 1984 changes to Scotland Today are reversed and the programme once again becomes a news broadcast with the feature elements transferred to a new lunchtime programme called Live at One Thirty.
- 1987
  - Ahead of the forthcoming launch of 24-hour broadcasting, Grampian stops broadcasting a news bulletin at closedown.
- 1988
  - 13 February – Scottish launches 24-hour broadcasting. This date also sees Scottish abandoning in-vision continuity, apart from during the overnight hours.
  - Grampian launches weekend regional news bulletins.
  - 2 September – Grampian and Border begin 24-hour broadcasting.
- 1989
  - August – BBC Scotland launches an extended Saturday teatime results programme. Rather than opting out of the last few minutes of Grandstand, the programme, called Afternoon Sportscene, runs for the entire duration of the time allocated for the day's results, starting at some point between 1 and 5 minutes before the network aired English counterpart Final Score.
  - Border begins providing a sub-regional service for Scottish Borders viewers served by the Selkirk transmitter, consisting of a short opt-out during Lookaround each weeknight.

== 1990s ==
- 1990
  - No events.
- 1991
  - 18 February – BBC1 Scotland is rebranded as BBC Scotland on 1 and BBC2 Scotland as BBC Scotland on 2.
  - 16 October – Scottish, Grampian and Border all retain their ITV licenses.
  - 31 December – The BBC airs the first edition of Hogmanay Live, an annual programme that rings in the New Year.
- 1992
  - No events.
- 1993
  - 4 January
    - Following the launch of GMTV, news bulletins from Scotland are seen on ITV at breakfast for the first time.
    - Scottish launches a 30-minute lunchtime edition of Scotland Today.
  - Launch of Telefios, a Scottish Gaelic news programme broadcast on both STV and Grampian.
  - May – After 29 series, Scottish axes Scotsport Results.
  - 31 December – The first edition of the annual Scottish football-themed comedy sketch show Only an Excuse? airs on BBC Scotland on 1, and is shown each Hogmanay.
- 1994
  - 10 November – The first edition of BBC Scotland Investigates is broadcast. It replaces Frontline Scotland.
- 1995
  - No events.
- 1996
  - 1 November – SMG plc and BSkyB launch Sky Scottish as a joint venture. Broadcast for two hours each evening, the channel is aimed at Scots living in other parts of the UK.
- 1997
  - June – SMG buys Grampian Television, the ITV contractor for Northern Scotland, for £105 million. Shortly afterwards, the company became SMG.
- 1998
  - 31 May – Sky Scottish closes because the channel fails to meet its financial targets.
  - 23 September – BBC Choice, the UK's first digital-only TV channel, launches. It broadcasts around two hours each night of programming for Scotland as an opt-out from the main channel.
  - 15 November – The public launch of digital terrestrial TV in the UK takes place.
- 1999
  - April – Border's sub-regional service for Scottish Borders viewers served by the Selkirk transmitter is extended to cover Dumfries and Galloway and a dedicated Scottish news bulletin is introduced on weekday lunchtimes.
  - 30 April – S2 launches.
  - 4 October – Launch of Newsnight Scotland, the BBC Scotland opt-out of the main Newsnight programme on BBC Two.
  - 31 October – Launch of TeleG, Scotland's first daily Gaelic language digital channel.

== 2000s ==
- 2000
  - Gaelic news bulletin Telefios is axed.
- 2001
  - 30 March – BBC Choice Scotland ends and shortly after, BBC Two's variants for Scotland are made available to digital viewers for the first time.
  - 27 July – S2 closes and is replaced by ITV2.
- 2002
  - 24 September – Debut of BBC Scotland's soap River City.
  - 28 October — Border Television is rebranded as ITV Border.
- 2003
  - 27 April – After more than 23 years on the air, the final edition of the soap opera Take the High Road is broadcast.
  - June – STV North's Aberdeen headquarters move to new smaller studios in the city's Tullos area.
- 2004
  - 8 January – STV launches a new political magazine programme called Politics Now. It replaces STV's Platform and Grampian's politics and current affairs programme Crossfire.
  - Autumn – The lunchtime edition of Scotland Today is axed.
- 2005
  - No events.
- 2006
  - 30 May – Scottish Television is rebranded as "STV" and the rebrand is rolled out across all of Scotland, thereby consigning the Grampian Television name to history after 45 years. The area formerly covered by Grampian is now called "STV North". "STV Central" becomes the legal name of the Scottish TV region.
  - STV moves from their Cowcaddens base to a new, smaller building at Pacific Quay alongside the headquarters of BBC Scotland.
- 2007
  - 8 January – STV launches separate news services for the East and West of the STV Central region, initially as a five-minute opt-out within the 6pm edition of Scotland Today on weeknights.
  - August – The Scottish Government establishes the Scottish Broadcasting Commission to oversee television production and broadcasting in Scotland.
  - 20 September – Prime Minister Gordon Brown opens the BBC Scotland's new Pacific Quay studio complex in Glasgow.
- 2008
  - 22 May – After more than 50 years on the air, STV axes Scotsport, doing so after BBC Scotland acquires highlights of the Scottish Premier League.
  - 19 September – Launch of the Scottish Gaelic television channel BBC Alba.
  - 1 October – Scottish Media Group is rebranded STV Group plc. It does this because it wants to highlight its renewed focus on television.
  - November – STV starts opting out of ITV programmes they claim were not performing well in their broadcast region. ITV's coverage of the FA Cup is also dropped.
- 2009
  - 23 March – Scotland Today and North Tonight are rebranded as STV News at Six, separate programmes and opt-outs for the North and Central regions are retained.
  - July – STV announces that it is withdrawing more ITV programmes from its schedules, such as The Bill, Doc Martin, Midsomer Murders, Poirot, and Lewis, instead preferring to concentrate on programming made within Scotland.

== 2010s ==
- 2010
  - 6 June – STV HD launches. It carries the West Central Scotland feed.
  - 20 October – Digital switchover in STV North (formerly the Grampian Television region) is completed when the analogue single emanating from Rosemarkie is switched off.
- 2011
  - 27 April – ITV plc and STV settle their legal dispute, with the former receiving £18million from STV.
  - May – Separate half-hour editions of STV News at Six for the East and West are launched alongside localised weeknight late-night news bulletins.
  - 21 May – The BBC says that due to bandwidth restrictions on Freeview, the launch of BBC Alba will require all but three of its radio stations to stop broadcasting on the platform in Scotland while the Gaelic language TV channel is on the air. The stations unaffected are BBC 1Xtra, BBC Radio 5 Live and BBC 6 Music.
  - 23 May – The Gaelic language channel TeleG closes after twelve years on the air.
  - 22 June – The Digital switchover is completed in Scotland when the analogue signals at Black Hill are switched off.
  - 24 October – STV launches a 30-minute late evening news programme with Scotland Tonight. It encompasses the weekly political programme Politics Now.
- 2012
  - March – A deal is announced between ITV and the other Channel 3 licence holders which would transform its commercial relationship with them after the broadcasters negotiated new Channel 3 networking arrangements. The deal would see STV and UTV become "affiliates" of the network, meaning they would pay an up-front fee for the rights to broadcast ITV content. At the time, the licence holders paid a percentage of the Channel 3 network costs based on their share of qualifying revenue.
  - April – STV's Edinburgh operation moves from George Street in the city centre to a new studio at Fountainbridge.
- 2013
  - 14 January – BBC One Scotland begins broadcasting in high-definition.
- 2014
  - 28 April – STV HD launches on the Sky and Freesat EPGs.
  - 22 May – The final edition of Newsnight Scotland airs on BBC Two Scotland.
  - 28 May – Scotland 2014 launches as BBC Scotland's replacement for Newsnight Scotland.
  - 2 June – STV launches the first of its local television channels with STV Glasgow.
  - 18–19 September – The BBC, ITV and Sky News provide coverage of the results of the Scottish independence referendum as the results are counted overnight.
- 2015
  - 12 January – STV launches its second local television channel with STV Edinburgh.
  - 19 March – STV is awarded three more local licenses, to cover Aberdeen, Ayr and Dundee.
- 2016
  - 14 December – The final edition of Scotland 2016 airs on BBC Two Scotland. It is replaced in the new year by a weekly programme called "Timeline".
- 2017
  - 24 April – STV merges its local channels and relaunches them as a single channel called STV2. The change sees STV launch a primetime weeknight news programme called STV News Tonight which combined news from across all of Scotland with UK and international news.
- 2018
  - 30 June – STV2 closes down and the channel's assets are sold to That's Media, owners of the That's TV network of local television stations in England. The closure results in the cancellation of STV News Tonight.
  - 7 September – The Edinburgh edition of STV News at Six ends and is replaced on the 10th by shorter opt-outs within a Central Scotland programme.
  - 15 October – That's TV Scotland launches as the replacement local television service in Aberdeen, Ayr, Dundee, Edinburgh and Glasgow.
- 2019
  - 17 February – BBC Two Scotland closes in preparation for the launch of the BBC Scotland channel. Viewers in Scotland can still watch the national version of BBC Two, with regional content aired by BBC Two Scotland being transferred to the new channel.
  - 24 February – The new BBC Scotland TV channel launches. Overnight figures indicate it to have had a peak viewership of 700,000, with five of the top ten programmes seen in Scotland being aired by BBC Scotland.
  - 25 February – BBC Scotland launches its weekday flagship news programme The Nine.
  - 27 February – Launch of Debate Night, BBC Scotland's weekly political debate show.

== 2020s ==
- 2020
  - No events.
- 2021
  - No events.
- 2022
  - November – STV launches Night Vision, which features news, sport and weather from across Scotland. Previously, STV had broadcast ITV's overnight filler programme Unwind with ITV (which was branded by STV as Unwind with STV).
- 2023
  - No events.
- 2024
  - 6 August – Ofcom approves planned changes to the BBC Scotland television channel that will see cutbacks to its news, with its hour-long 9pm weekday programme The Nine replaced by a 30 minute programme at 7pm.
- 2025
  - 2 January – The very last edition of Sportscene Results is broadcast, ending after 35 years.
  - 9 January – Sportscene Results' replacement begins. Called Open All Mics, the programme is an in-vision simulcasts of BBC Radio Scotland supplemented by on-screen graphics such as the vidiprinter, scores, statistics and match summaries.

== See also ==
- Timeline of Scottish Television
- Timeline of Grampian Television
- Timeline of Border Television
