= 2010 in Scottish television =

This is a list of events in Scottish television from 2010.

== Events ==
=== March ===
- 25 March – STV loses the contract to provide Scottish news coverage on its own television channel to Scottish News Consortium, a group involving the parent company of the Press and Journal.
- 30 March – Dates are announced for the end of analogue television in Scotland, with a gradual switch-off process set to be completed by mid-June 2011.

=== April ===
- 22 April – Launch of The Nightshift on STV Central. The overnight service launches on STV North on 13 July.
- 25 April – Leaders of Scotland's four main political parties take part in a televised debate on Sky News ahead of the upcoming general election.

=== May ===
- 5 May – Digital switchover begins in Scotland when the Bressay Hill transmitter and its relays have their analogue BBC Two signal switched off. Two weeks later the other analogue channels are switched off. The nearby Keelylang Hill transmitter also goes through switchover during May.
- 6–7 May – Coverage of the 2010 general election is shown on all major television networks and once again, BBC Parliament broadcasts BBC Scotland's results programme to the whole of the UK.

=== June ===
- 6 June – STV HD launches. It carries the West Central Scotland feed.
- 8 June – Plans for STV's news output to be taken over by Scottish News Consortium are effectively dead in the water after the recently elected coalition government at Westminster signals its intention to scrap the scheme that made the establishment of alternative news providers possible. The Independently Funded News Consotria scheme had been established by the previous Labour government to help independent television companies who were having difficulties meeting their news coverage remit because of financial constraints, and would have seen Scottish News Consortium awarded £47million from public funds. Secretary of State for Culture, Media and Sport Jeremy Hunt calls the scheme "misguided".
- 16 June – Digital switchover is completed at the Rumster Forest transmitter and its relays.
- 20 June – Thousands of hours of programming from STV's archives will be made available online from later in the year after the Scottish broadcaster signed a deal with YouTube, the Daily Record reports.

=== July ===
- 21 July – Digital switchover is completed at the Eitshal transmitter and its relays.
- 28 July – Digital switchover is completed at the Skriaig transmitter and its relays.

=== August ===
- 9 August – Viewers in Scotland complain to the BBC after hearing newsreader Kate Silverton swear at the end of a bulletin. The presenter had not realised the mic was still on when she uttered the expletive, which is only picked up by BBC One Scotland. The BBC later apologises for the incident.
- 18 August – Digital switchover is completed at the Angus transmitter and its relays.
- 19 August – STV begins airing the UTV produced quiz strand Brain Box. The unpopular show is axed in February 2011.

=== September ===
- 6 September – With the launch of ITV's new breakfast service Daybreak replacing GMTV, GMTV Scotland is renamed Daybreak Scotland.
- 15 September – Digital switchover is completed at the Durris transmitter and its relays.
- 22 September – Digital switchover is completed at the Knockmore transmitter and its relays.

=== October ===
- 13 October – Digital switchover begins in the STV Central region when the BBC Two analogue signal emanating from the Torosay transmitter and its relays is switched off. The remaining analogue channels stop broadcasting from this transmitter two weeks later.
- 20 October – Digital switchover in the STV North region is completed when the analogue signal emanating from Rosemarkie and its relays are switched off.

=== November ===
- 5 November – Members of the National Union of Journalists at the BBC begin a 48-hour strike in a dispute over proposed changes to the corporation's pension scheme. BBC News operates a reduced service.
- 6 November – BBC TV bulletins in Scotland are dropped as the strike by the corporation's journalists continues.
- 7 November – The final episode of Taggart is broadcast, bringing to an end a series which had been on air for more than 25 years.
- 16 November – Former BBC Director-General Greg Dyke says that a Scottish television channel would be "of value" as an alternative to the BBC and STV, but should be publicly funded as advertising revenue would be difficult to raise.

=== December ===
- 21 December – The BBC Trust gives the go-ahead for the Gaelic language channel BBC Alba to be made available on Freeview in Scotland. However, due to bandwidth restrictions the corporation's 13 radio stations will be unavailable while the channel is on air.

== Debuts ==
=== BBC ===
- 11 January – Limmy's Show on BBC Two (2010–2013)
- 18 May – The Scheme on BBC One (2010–2011)
- 10 October – Single Father on BBC One (2010)

=== ITV ===
- 22 April – The Nightshift (2010–present)
- 19 August – Brain Box (2010–2011)

== Television series ==
- Reporting Scotland (1968–1983; 1984–present)
- Sportscene (1975–present)
- The Beechgrove Garden (1978–present)
- Only an Excuse? (1993–2020)
- River City (2002–2026)
- Politics Now (2004–2011)
- The Adventure Show (2005–present)
- Daybreak Scotland (2007–present)
- Trusadh (2008–present)
- The Hour (2009–2011)
- Gary: Tank Commander (2009–2012)
- Sport Nation (2009–present)
- STV News at Six (2009–present)

== Ending this year ==
- 30 May – STV Rugby (2009–2010; 2011–present)
- 21 October – Single Father (2010)
- 7 November – Taggart (1983–2010)

== Deaths ==
- 18 April – Tom Fleming, 82, actor
- 21 June – Tam White, 67, musician
- 29 August – Ranald Graham, 69, writer, director and producer
- 19 October – Graham Crowden, 87, actor
- 28 October – Gerard Kelly, 51, actor

== See also ==
- 2010 in Scotland
