= Timeline of Grampian Television =

This is a timeline of the history of the British broadcaster Grampian Television. It provided the ITV network service for the north of Scotland between 1960 and 2006.

The timeline continues until digital switchover is completed as this is the final Grampian-related 'event'.

== 1960s ==
- 1960
  - August – North of Scotland Television is awarded the licence to cover north and north east Scotland on the condition that positions on the board are offered to the two losing applicants, Caledonian Television and North Caledonian Television.
- 1961
  - 11 January – North of Scotland Television is renamed Grampian Television as it is thought that the North of Scotland TV name would be too cumbersome.
  - 30 September – At 2:45 p.m., Grampian Television, the ITV franchise for North East Scotland, goes on the air, broadcasting 405-line television from two television transmitter sites. Durris (serving Aberdeen and east coast) on VHF channel 9 and Mounteagle (serving Inverness and the Moray Firth) on VHF channel 12.
- 1962
  - In a bid to increase viewership, especially in the Dundee area, Grampian begins broadcasting light entertainment and music shows. Previously, Grampian's only local programming had been in news and current affairs.
- 1963
  - No events.
- 1964
  - Grampian is given a three-year extension to its licence. This is later extended by a further year.
- 1965
  - Grampian Television extended its viewing area, with two new transmitters opening, meaning programmes could be viewed from St. Andrews to the Orkney Isles.
  - 25 June - The Rumster Forest transmitter begins broadcasting to Caithness and the Orkney Isles, on ch8 (VHF 405-line).
  - 13 October - The Angus transmitter opens, broadcasting on ch11 to the Dundee and Perth areas.
- 1966
  - No events.
- 1967
  - Prior to the 1968 contract round, smaller regional stations sought an affiliation with one of the four major ITV companies, who would provide the bulk of their programming. Grampian links up with ABC Weekend Television. Grampian goes on to retain its licence for a further seven years.
- 1968
  - August – A technicians strike forces ITV off the air for several weeks although management manage to launch a temporary ITV Emergency National Service with no regional variations.
- 1969
  - 29 November - A low power relay station at Aviemore, broadcasting on channel 10 opens, and becomes the final 405-line transmitter in the Grampian region.

== 1970s ==
- 1970
  - No events.
- 1971
  - 30 September – Grampian Television marks its tenth birthday by commencing colour transmissions, using the 625 lines PAL system from the Durris transmitter on UHF ch25.
- 1972
  - 30 September - Colour television is extended with the Angus transmitter on UHF ch60.
  - 16 October – Following a law change which removed all restrictions on broadcasting hours, Grampian is able to launch an afternoon service.
- 1973
  - 8 October - Colour transmissions begin from the Rosemarkie transmitter using UHF ch49. The Rosemarkie site was owned by the BBC and chosen for colour transmissions instead of the nearby Mounteagle transmitter.
  - 24 December - in time for Christmas, colour television is extended when the Rumster Forest UHF service opens on ch24.
- 1974
  - The 1974 franchise round sees no changes in ITV's contractors as the huge cost in switching to colour television would have made the companies unable to compete against rivals in a franchise battle.
  - 28 October - a new television transmitter at Knock More comes into service, extending colour television in the Moray area. Knock More broadcast Grampian on UHF ch23.
- 1975
  - 19 December - Colour broadcasts of Grampian are improved in the Orkney Islands with the opening the Keelylang Hill transmitter, broadcasting on UHF ch43.
- 1976
  - For a second time, the Grampian region is expanded as ITV is extended to cover the Outer Hebrides and Shetland Islands.
  - 26 July - Grampian broadcasts for the first time in Colour to the Outer Hebrides with the opening of the Eitshal transmitter, on UHF ch23.
  - 24 December - Grampian provides the first Colour television signals on the Shetland Isles with the opening of the Bressay transmitter on UHF ch25. (BBC1 and BBC2 colour broadcasts from Bressay would follow in June 1977).
- 1977
  - Grampian makes slight changes to its logo, most notably removing the animation.
- 1978
  - Grampian Television becomes the first British television station to adopt ENG video cameras for news coverage, a move which finally allows its regional news programme, Grampian Today, to extend from three to five nights a week. Grampian also develops its own outside broadcast unit, initially using studio equipment.
- 1979
  - 10 August – The ten week ITV strike forces Grampian Television off the air. The strike ends on 24 October.

== 1980s ==
- 1980
  - 7 January – Grampian Today is relaunched as North Tonight as part of an effort to reflect northern Scotland as a whole. The new programme replaces Grampian Today which had been on air since around 1978.
  - Grampian launches weekday and closedown news bulletins, called North News and North Headlines respectively.
- 1981
  - No events.
- 1982
  - Grampian updates its logo.
- 1983
  - 1 February – ITV's breakfast television service TV-am launches. It is a UK-wide service and therefore contains no Scottish-specific content. Consequently, Grampian's broadcast day now begins at 9:25am.
  - Grampian opens a new studio in Inverness to increase newsgathering across the Highlands and Islands.
- 1984
  - Debut of Grampian Television’s current affairs programme Crossfire.
  - 9 July – The 405-lines service at the Angus and Durris transmitters is switched off.
- 1985
  - 4 January – Grampian's last day of transmission using the 405-lines system. The switch-off results in the cessation of television broadcasts from the Mounteagle transmitter, although transmissions from that tower will resume when Channel 5 launches on 30 March 1997.
  - January – Grampian Television introduces a new computerised logo.
- 1986
  - No events.
- 1987
  - 7 September – Following the transfer of ITV Schools to Channel 4, ITV provides a full morning programme schedule, with advertising, for the first time. The new service includes regular five-minute national and regional news bulletins.
  - Ahead of the forthcoming launch of 24-hour broadcasting, Grampian ends its closedown news bulletin.
- 1988
  - Grampian launches weekend regional news bulletins and at the same time, all of Grampian's news bulletins are renamed as Grampian Headlines.
  - 2 September – Grampian begins 24-hour broadcasting.
- 1989
  - 1 September – ITV introduces its first official logo as part of an attempt to unify the network under one image whilst retaining regional identity. Grampian adopts the look and they make slight changes to its logo, most notably removing the animation.

== 1990s ==
- 1990
  - No events.
- 1991
  - 16 October – Grampian retains its licence. There were three applicants for the licence and the other two bid more than Grampian. However both failed the quality threshold test.
- 1992
  - No events.
- 1993
  - December – Grampian, in partnership with Border Television, is awarded the licence for a new regional radio station serving Central Scotland. The station wins the bid under the name of Central Scotland Radio.
- 1994
  - 16 September – Central Scotland Radio begins broadcasting, as Scot FM.
- 1995
  - No events.
- 1996
  - July – Grampian sells Scot FM to the Independent Radio Group for £5.25 million.
- 1997
  - June – Scottish Media Group buys Grampian Television for £105 million.
- 1998
  - Summer – In-vision continuity is dropped with announcements made over a new black ident and slides. Grampian makes slight changes to its logo, most notably removing the animation. In September, the continuity is moved to Glasgow.
  - 15 November – The public launch of digital terrestrial TV in the UK takes place.
- 1999
  - No events.

== 2000s ==
- 2000
  - 28 February – Having decided not to adopt the 1999 ITV generic look, Scottish and Grampian launch a new on-screen logo.
- 2001
  - Grampian closes its Stornoway studio.
- 2002
  - Grampian Headlines is renamed Grampian News.
- 2003
  - 6 January – Scottish and Grampian adopt the celebrity idents package, albeit with their own logos attached and with idents featuring a lot more Scottish personalities alongside those of ITV1.
  - June – Grampian moves to new smaller studios in the city's Tullos area of Aberdeen.
- 2004
  - 8 January – Grampian's regional current affairs and politics series Crossfire is replaced by a new programme, Politics Now, which is broadcast on both Grampian and STV.
- 2005
  - No events.
- 2006
  - 30 May – After 45 years, the Grampian Television brand is consigned to history when the region is renamed STV North.
- 2007
  - 8 January – Viewers of North Tonight begin to receive two different programmes - those in the Dundee, Angus, Perthshire and north-east Fife area receive a dedicated bulletin within the main North Tonight programme.
- 2008
  - No events.
- 2009
  - 20 March – The last main edition of North Tonight is aired ahead of a major revamp.
  - 23 March – STV News at Six launches, replacing North Tonight and Scotland Today. The regional news service for the North is retained along with the sub opt-out for Tayside.
- 2010
  - 5 May-20 October – digital switchover takes place in the Grampian region, beginning in the Shetland Islands with the Bressay transmitting station, and ending when the Rosemarkie transmitter switchover takes place in October.

== See also ==
- History of ITV
- History of ITV television idents
- Timeline of ITV
- Timeline of television in Scotland – includes coverage of Grampian's successor STV North
- Timeline of Scottish Television – includes coverage of Grampian's successor STV North
