= Knock More transmitting station =

Television transmitting station in the UK

Knock More
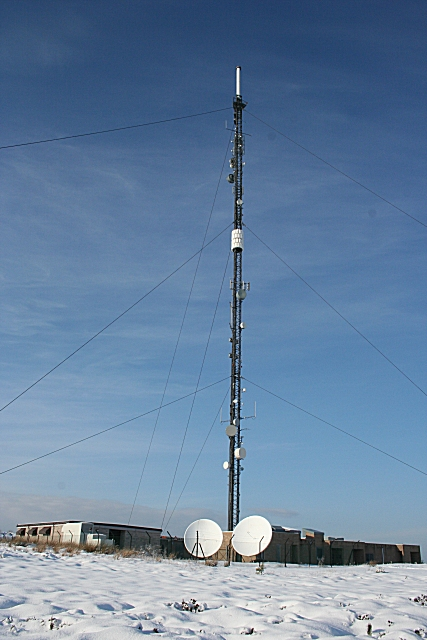

- Location within Moray
- Location: near Boharm, Moray
- Mast height: 113 metres (371 ft)
- Coordinates: 57.532332°N 3.135127°W
- Grid reference: NJ322497
- BBC region: BBC Scotland
- ITV region: STV North

The Knock More transmitting station (sometimes spelled "Knockmore") is a broadcasting facility, located at Knock More, to east of the parish of Boharm, Scotland, in Moray (grid reference NJ322497). It is a guyed steel lattice mast which stands 113 metres (371 ft) high. The mast is located on elevated ground which is about 355 m above sea level, and is between Elgin and Keith. It was built by the Independent Broadcasting Authority (IBA) to improve and extend UHF television coverage in north east Scotland, and is now owned and operated by Arqiva.

== Coverage ==
Knock More broadcasts to an area of Scotland which lies between the transmission areas of the Durris and Rosemarkie stations, primarily in the Moray region of Scotland. There is good reception of Knock More in Buckie, Elgin, Dufftown, Keith, Lhanbryde and Lossiemouth. The Rumster Forest station also provides an overlap and alternative television signal along the coastal area between Burghead and Banff. Across the Moray Firth, reception of Knock More is also possible in coastal locations from Balintore and Brora as far north as Lybster.

== History ==
The ITU conference held in Stockholm, Sweden in 1961 led to the planning of the UHF television broadcasting network in the United Kingdom. A high power UHF television transmitter was allocated for 625-line colour transmissions close to Banff, with the broadcasting channels 23/26/29/33 broadcasting at 100 kW effective radiated power (erp).

The station opened on 28 October 1974 broadcasting the BBC and ITV colour 625-line television channels on UHF band IV, using the PAL system, with horizontal polarisation.

Frequency	UHF	kW	Service
487.25 MHz	23	100	ITV Grampian
511.25 MHz	26	100	BBC2
567.25 MHz	33	100	BBC1

Previously, 405-line television (broadcasting on the VHF bands I and III) had been available for many viewers from neighbouring transmitters at Meldrum and Rosemarkie (BBC) and Durris, Mounteagle and Rumster Forest (ITV Grampian).

Programmes from Channel 4 opened on UHF channel 29 in April 1984, with BBC Radio broadcasts on VHF band II commencing from October 1984.

Knock More also broadcast its UHF 625-line colour television programmes on alternative frequencies (UHF channels 66/55/59/62) in a south-westerly direction to provide a better source for the television relay at Grantown. The Grantown relay is located on high ground, and two of the incoming programme sources from Knock More (ITV on ch23 and BBC2 on ch26) would have experienced adjacent-channel interference from Rumster Forest (which broadcast on ch24 and ch27).

Interim Digital terrestrial television opened from 15 November 1999 at Knock More using channels 34, 30, 53, 60, and 56. Knock More had been considered a "group A" transmitter (UHF channels 21–34, Band IV). Three of the new digital multiplexes were in the upper part of Band V, which would have required some viewers to replace their aerials with a wideband television aerial covering channels 21–68.

Full digital switchover completed on 22 September 2010, with the public service broadcast multiplexes using UHF channels 23, 26, and 29, and the commercial multiplexes on 53, 57, and 60.

The 700 MHz clearance event in 2017 meant the commercial multiplexes were required to vacate their part of the television broadcasting spectrum, and as a result of this, a retune for viewers was required.

== Current broadcasting ==
=== Television ===
As of 2023, Knock More broadcasts digital terrestrial television on the following UHF frequencies

Frequency	UHF	kW	Multiplex	System
538.000 MHz	29	20	BBC B	DVB-T2
554.000 MHz	31	20	BBC A	DVB-T
570.000 MHz	33	10	SDN	DVB-T
594.000 MHz	36	10	Arqiva A	DVB-T
602.000 MHz	37	20	Digital 3&4	DVB-T
690.000 MHz	48	10	Arqiva B	DVB-T

=== Analogue radio (FM VHF) ===
Frequency	kW	Service
88.2 MHz	20	BBC Radio 2
90.4 MHz	20	BBC Radio 3
92.6 MHz	20	BBC Radio Scotland
94.8 MHz	20	BBC Radio 4
97.8 MHz	20	BBC Radio 1

=== Digital radio (DAB) ===
Frequency	Block	Operator
218.640 MHz	11B	Bauer Inverness
225.648 MHz	12B	BBC National DAB

Analogue Television:

Analogue Television:

Frequency	UHF	kW	Service
567.25 MHz	33	100	BBC One Scotland
487.25 MHz	23	100	STV (North) (Grampian)
511.25 MHz	26	100	BBC Two Scotland
535.25 MHz	29	100	Channel 4

== Relays ==
Below is a list of DTT transmitters that relay television broadcasts from Knock More. (Note: only public service broadcast multiplexes are broadcast from these relay sites)

Transmitter	kW	BBC-A	BBC-B	D3&4	Pol.
Aviemore	0.0026	28	25	22	V
Avoch	0.002	32	34	35	V
Balblair Wood	0.00263	32	34	35	V
Craigellachie	0.014	40	43	46	V
Grantown	0.07	44	41+	47	V
Kingussie	0.02	46	43	40	V
Lairg	0.0026	44	41+	47	V
