= 2005 in Scottish television =

This is a list of events in Scottish television from 2005.

== Events ==
- 5–6 May – BBC Parliament broadcasts BBC Scotland's 2005 general election results programme.
- 18 September – The STV sports programme Scotsport celebrates 50 years on air.

== Debuts ==
=== BBC ===
- December – VideoGaiden on BBC Two (2005–2008)

=== ITV ===
- Unknown – The Scottish Golf Show (2005)

== Television series ==
- Scotsport (1957–2008)
- Reporting Scotland (1968–1983; 1984–present)
- Scotland Today (1972–2009)
- Sportscene (1975–present)
- The Beechgrove Garden (1978–present)
- Grampian Today (1980–2009)
- Taggart (1983–2010)
- Only an Excuse? (1993–2020)
- Still Game (2002–2007; 2016–2019)
- River City (2002–2026)
- The Karen Dunbar Show (2003–2006)
- Politics Now (2004–2011)

== Ending this year ==
- 23 October – Monarch of the Glen (2000–2005)
- 27 November – Shoebox Zoo on BBC One (2004–2005)
- Balamory (2002–2005)

== Deaths ==
- 9 March – Kathie Kay, 86, singer
- 14 May - George Barron, 91, original presenter of The Beechgrove Garden (1978–84)
- 31 August – Michael Sheard, 77, actor

== See also ==
- 2005 in Scotland
