= SmartPTT =

SmartPTT is a DMR software application developed by Elcomplus Company for MOTOTRBO Professional Digital Two-Way Radio Platform from Motorola.

SmartPTT enables the construction of complex dispatch control systems for

- Linear-extended objects: oil and gas pipelines, electrical grids, highways, railways, etc.
- Geographically distributed objects: emergency services, municipalities, public transport, security services, etc.
- Local objects: manufacturing plants, airports, supermarkets, hotels, etc.

== Features ==
- Voice dispatch: private and group calls to radio subscribers
- Automatic Vehicle Location (AVL): real-time GPS tracking of subscribers
- Telephone interconnect: dialing telephone number from a radio, private and group radio calls from telephone
- Radio network bridging: communication between customers located in different networks
- Data transmission: text messaging, subscriber status control, email gateway, telemetry
- Data and voice logging: logging of all events in the system and voice calls recording
- Real-time monitoring of MOTOTRBO infrastructure: voice and data activity, network topology, coverage map, hardware diagnostics

== Components ==
SmartPTT software consists of SmartPTT Dispatch Console and SmartPTT Radioserver.

- SmartPTT Dispatch Console is a client software application that is installed on a PC. The PC is connected to radioservers over the Internet or dedicated IP-channels and can be located at any distance from the controlled networks.
- SmartPTT Radioserver provides an interface between radio network subscribers and dispatch consoles, and also implements some functionality of the system: interface to radio network via base stations or via IP-connection to the radio repeaters, telephone interconnect, email gateway, configurable operator profiles to limit their access to the system.

== Users ==
- Mobile subscribers use MOTOTRBO radios and get access to the radio network system within its coverage area.
- Dispatchers use advanced features and capabilities, e.g. communication with mobile subscribers, as well as monitoring of their activity. Dispatchers have access to the system using the dispatcher console and they are responsible for management and maintenance of the whole communication system.
- Heads of departments have access to analytical information.

== See also ==
- Professional mobile radio
- Digital mobile radio
- Computer-aided dispatch
- Radio repeater
- Base station
- Two-way radio
- Trunked radio system
