= Shammy Dab =

- Genre: Comedy panel game
- Presented by: Bill Torrance; Johnny Beattie; Dougie Donnelly
- Starring: Andy Cameron; George Duffus; Art Sutter
- Country of origin: Scotland
- Original language: English
- No. of series: 6
- No. of episodes: 54

Production
- Running time: 30 minutes (inc. adverts)
- Production company: Shihallion Television

Original release
- Network: Grampian Television
- Release: 8 January 1985 – 1 June 1989

Shammy Dab is a Scottish comedy panel game show that aired on Grampian Television from 8 January 1985 to 1 June 1989.

== History ==
Shammy Dab was created in 1975 by Bill Torrance as part of a series for Radio Forth in Edinburgh entitled Fair Flummoxed. The radio version mainly featured Scottish country dance bands.

The name was changed to 'Shammy Dab' (referring to a cheap wall decoration where a wall was stippled with a wet sponge - when done well, it was said to be a shammy dab).

== Transmissions ==
In later years, the series was also aired on Border Television and Scottish Television.

Series	Start date	End date	Episodes
1	8 January 1985	12 February 1985	6
2	14 May 1985	18 June 1985	6
3	11 March 1986	22 April 1986	7
4	14 July 1986	18 August 1986	6
5	20 January 1987	14 April 1987	13
6	16 February 1989	1 June 1989	16
