= Angus transmitting station =

Transmitter station in Angus, Scotland

Angus

- Location within Angus
- Mast height: 229.5 metres (753 ft)
- Coordinates: 56.555°N 2.986111°W
- Grid reference: NO394407
- BBC region: BBC Scotland
- ITV region: STV North

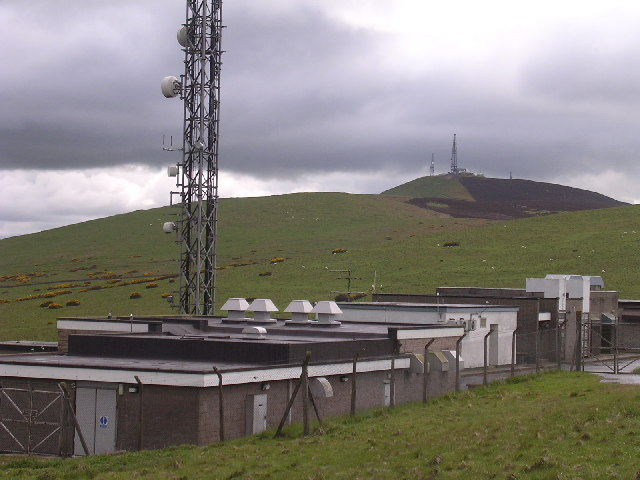
Base of transmitter and surrounding buildings seen close up. Other transmitters situated on adjacent Craigowl Hill can be seen in the distance.

The Angus transmitting station is a broadcasting and telecommunications facility, situated approximately five miles due north of Dundee, between the villages of Charleston and Tealing, Scotland (grid reference NO394407). It includes a guyed steel lattice mast which is 229.5 metres (753 ft) in height. Mounted at the top are the UHF television antennas, contained within a GRP shroud. These antennas have an average height above Ordnance Datum of 547 metres (1,795 ft). It is owned and operated by Arqiva.

== History ==
It was constructed in 1965 by the ITA, having been chosen as a suitable site for high power colour UHF transmissions.

The construction contract was given to J. L. Eve Construction in April 1963, to be built at Harecairn by early 1964, for the Tayside area, but not Dundee, which had a separate relay station.

The relay station was built by Laird Brothers, of Forfar, to open in the summer of 1964.

The site opened in October 1965, with ITV on Channel 11. It was built at Balcalk Hill.

=== Opening ===
The first broadcasts began on VHF channel 11 in black and white, from 13 October 1965 A new television production site in Dundee was built later.

=== Transmission ===
Trade testing of BBC2 in colour began on Monday 14 July 1969, going into full service on Monday 28 July 1969 on channel 68.

BBC1 in colour began from Saturday 2 October 1971, for 300,000 viewers, six months ahead of schedule.

In May 1972, the ITA announced that ITV would broadcast in colour from September 1972. ITV would add colour from Saturday 30 September 1972. 405 line TV transmissions ceased on the 9th of July 1984.

Channel 5 was never available in analogue from Angus, but it was from Perth on channel 55 and Tay Bridge on 34.

== Coverage area ==
The site covers parts of the Dundee City council area, eastern Perth and Kinross, southern Angus and north and east Fife. Reception is also possible in much of north and east Edinburgh and the coastal areas of East Lothian, as far along as the town of Dunbar.

== Relay transmitters ==
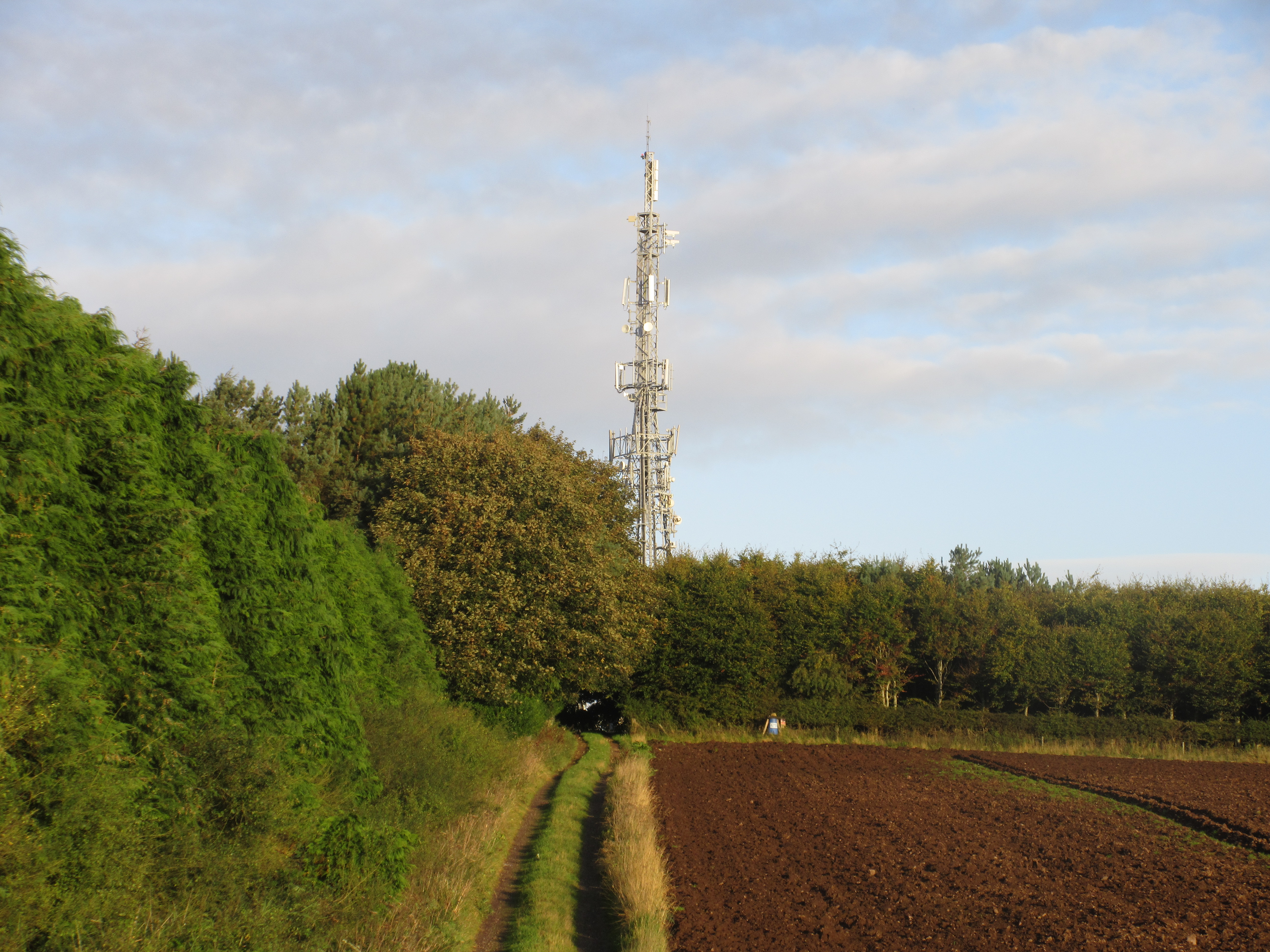
Tay Bridge relay transmitter seen close up and also from Dundee Law (around three miles away)
- Tay Bridge transmitting station (56.4447°N 2.925°W), which is owned and operated by Arqiva.

== Channels listed by frequency ==
=== Analogue radio (FM VHF) ===
Frequency	kW		Service
Frequency	H	V	Service
100.1 MHz	2.125	8.5	Classic FM
102.8 MHz	1	4	Tay FM

† Mixed polarisation.

=== Digital radio (DAB) ===
Frequency	Block	kW	Operator
218.640 MHz	11B	3	Score Dundee
222.064 MHz	12A	10	Digital One
225.648 MHz	12B	10	BBC National DAB

=== Television ===
==== Analogue ====
===== 28 July 1969 – 1972 =====
Frequency	UHF	kW	Service
807.25 MHz	63	100	BBC2 Scotland

===== 1972 – November 1982 =====
Frequency	UHF	kW	Service
759.25 MHz	57	100	BBC1 Scotland
783.25 MHz	60	100	Grampian
807.25 MHz	63	100	BBC2 Scotland

===== November 1982 – 14 November 1998 =====
Channel 4 was launched on UHF 53

Frequency	UHF	kW	Service
727.25 MHz	53	100	Channel 4
759.25 MHz	57	100	BBC1 Scotland
783.25 MHz	60	100	Grampian
807.25 MHz	63	100	BBC2 Scotland

==== Analogue and digital ====
===== 15 November 1998 – 3 August 2010 =====
Digital terrestrial television was first transmitted from the Angus mast from 15 November 1998 using the frequency gaps between the analogue TV broadcasts. To limit interference to the analogue transmissions, power output on the digital multiplexes was low.

Frequency	UHF	kW	Operator	System
727.25 MHz	53	100	Channel 4	PAL System I
753.833 MHz	56-	2	Arqiva (Mux C)	DVB-T
759.25 MHz	57	100	BBC One Scotland	PAL System I
777.833 MHz	59-	4	SDN (Mux A)	DVB-T
783.25 MHz	60	100	STV (North) (Grampian until 2006)	PAL System I
801.833 MHz	62-	4	BBC (Mux B)	DVB-T
807.25 MHz	63	100	BBC Two Scotland	PAL System I
825.833 MHz	65-	2	Arqiva (Mux D)	DVB-T
834.166 MHz	66+	4	Digital 3&4 (Mux 2)	DVB-T
850.000 MHz	68	4	BBC (Mux 1)	DVB-T

===== 4 August 2010 - 17 August 2010 =====
On 4 August 2010, BBC2 was switched off on UHF 63 and STV was switched from UHF 60 for its final weeks of service. Multiplex 1 on UHF 68 was closed and replaced by BBC A on UHF 60 (which had just been vacated by analogue STV). BBC A was transmitted at full power (20 kW) and in 64QAM, 8k carriers mode from the start.

Frequency	UHF	kW	Operator	System
727.25 MHz	53	100	Channel 4	PAL System I
753.833 MHz	56-	2	Arqiva (Mux C)	DVB-T
759.25 MHz	57	100	BBC One Scotland	PAL System I
777.833 MHz	59-	4	SDN (Mux A)	DVB-T
786.000 MHz	60	20	BBC A	DVB-T
801.833 MHz	62-	4	BBC (Mux B)	DVB-T
807.25 MHz	63	100	STV (North)	PAL System I
825.833 MHz	65-	2	Arqiva (Mux D)	DVB-T
834.166 MHz	66+	4	Digital 3&4 (Mux 2)	DVB-T

==== Digital ====
===== 18 August 2010 to 16 April 2013 =====
Following the completion of analogue TV shutdown on 18 August 2010, Angus transmitted all of its higher powered multiplexes at 20 kW for PSB 1, 2 and 3, and 10 kW for COM 4, 5 and 6. From this date the frequency allocation was:

Frequency	UHF	kW	Operator	System
730.000 MHz	53	20	Digital 3&4	DVB-T
738.000 MHz	54	10	SDN	DVB-T
762.000 MHz	57	20	BBC B	DVB-T2
770.000 MHz	58	10	Arqiva A	DVB-T
786.000 MHz	60	20	BBC A	DVB-T
794.000 MHz	61	10	Arqiva B	DVB-T

===== 17 April 2013 to 26 November 2019 =====
Due to the clearance of the 800 MHz band, Arqiva B was moved from UHF 61 to UHF 49 and BBC A gained a negative offset. Also during this time, COM 7 and 8 and the Local TV multiplex launched.

Frequency	UHF	kW	Operator	System
690.000 MHz	48	1	Local TV	DVB-T
698.000 MHz	49	10	Arqiva B	DVB-T
730.000 MHz	53	20	Digital 3&4	DVB-T
738.000 MHz	54	10	SDN	DVB-T
746.000 MHz	55	5	COM 7	DVB-T2
754.000 MHz	56	5	COM 8	DVB-T2
762.000 MHz	57	20	BBC B	DVB-T2
770.000 MHz	58	10	Arqiva A	DVB-T
785.833 MHz	60-	20	BBC A	DVB-T

===== 27 November 2019 to 24 June 2020 =====
Due to the clearance of the 700 MHz band, the following channels come into use:

Frequency	UHF	kW	Operator	System
570.000 MHz	33	10	SDN	DVB-T
578.000 MHz	34	1	Local TV	DVB-T
594.000 MHz	36	10	Arqiva A	DVB-T
618.000 MHz	39	20	BBC A	DVB-T
642.000 MHz	42	20	Digital 3&4	DVB-T
666.000 MHz	45	20	BBC B	DVB-T2
690.000 MHz	48	10	Arqiva B	DVB-T
746.000 MHz	55	5	COM 7	DVB-T2
754.000 MHz	56	5	COM 8	DVB-T2

===== 25 June 2020 to Present =====
Due to the clearance of UHF 56 (COM8), in the 700 MHz band, the following channels come into use:

Frequency	UHF	kW	Operator	System
570.000 MHz	33	10	SDN	DVB-T
578.000 MHz	34	1	Local TV	DVB-T
594.000 MHz	36	10	Arqiva A	DVB-T
618.000 MHz	39	20	BBC A	DVB-T
642.000 MHz	42	20	Digital 3&4	DVB-T
666.000 MHz	45	20	BBC B	DVB-T2
690.000 MHz	48	10	Arqiva B	DVB-T
746.000 MHz	55	5	COM 7	DVB-T2

Digital Switchover: on the 4th of August 2010 BBC2 was switched off on UHF 63 and STV moved from that channel 60 TO BBC2'S old frequenecy to allow bbc A to launch on STV's old Frequency, MUX 1 on 68 was switched off and repalced by BBC A (which have been vacanted by Analogue STV) BBC A was transmitted at full power (20 kW) and in 64QAM, 8k carriers mode from the start.

== See also ==
- List of masts
- List of tallest buildings and structures in Great Britain
- List of radio stations in the United Kingdom
