= Jim McColl (presenter) =

Scottish horticulturist and presenter (1935–2024)

James Hamilton McColl, MBE (1935 – 22 October 2024) was a Scottish horticulturalist, writer and garden presenter. He was one of the original presenters of BBC Scotland's flagship gardening programme Beechgrove. McColl co-presented the programme for 41 years, becoming the BBC's longest serving garden presenter.

== Background ==
McColl was born in 1935 in Kilmarnock, East Ayrshire. He grew up in a horticulturally minded family. His father Tom McColl was responsible for gardening responsibilities as the manager of Helensburgh Town Council’s parks department. He first learned about farming from his uncles, an aunt was a market gardener, and another uncle was a forester. During the summer he would spend time working at his aunt Mary's garden or on a rose production nursery.

McColl trained as a horticulturalist at the West of Scotland College of Agriculture (later becoming Scottish Agricultural College) in Auchincruive, Ayr.

McColl would go on to teach horticulture at universities and colleges, later working for the British Ministry of Agriculture in Leicester. Outside of gardening, McColl was known for his love of music, playing both the piano and accordion, or "squeezebox".

In 1959 he married his wife Billie. In the early 1970s McColl returned to Scotland to teach at North of Scotland College of Agriculture in Aberdeen. After returning to Scotland, he began appearing as a radio presenter on BBC Radio Scotland's gardening programmes, including The Scottish Garden.

"Before I got involved with Beechgrove, I was on a show when a chap from Perth rang in and asked for advice about growing a plant called Northern Lights. The others (on the panel) thought it was a type of cabbage, but I knew he meant a type of cannabis plant because, previously I had grown cannabis sativa in a foliage border in the Reading University teaching garden in Shinfield in 1960. I gave the caller plenty of advice on how to grow the plant, but then, just a few days later, the police got in touch, wanting to know the callers details" - Jim McColl

In 1973, he worked with the Glen Garioch distillery to create a waste energy programme to utilize residual heat from whisky cooling to grow tomatoes. He presented the project on the programme Tomorrow's World, which would be his first time appearing in a television programme. His appearance on Tomorrow's World was said to have impressed BBCs executives, who at the time were considering developing a television programme based on Scottish gardening. The waste-heat project was later featured in the UK exhibit of the 1982 World's Fair in Knoxville, Tennessee.

=== Beechgrove ===
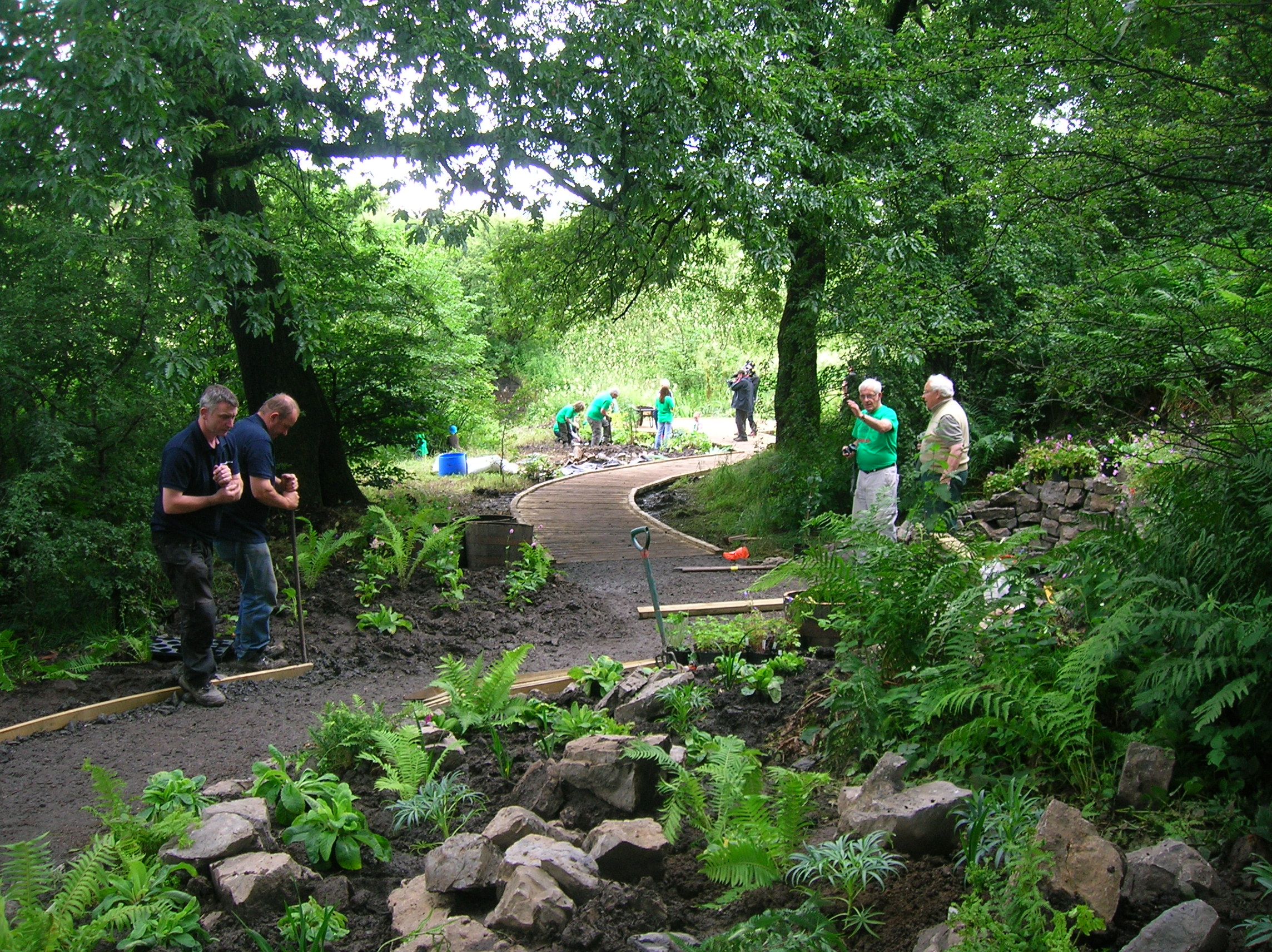
Filming at Beechgrove in 2012. McColl is pictured at far right in the image.

In 1978, McColl and George Barron were announced as the first presenters of The Beechgrove Garden, a new BBC gardening program inspired by a gardening show based in Boston, Massachusetts. The programme featured gardening specific to Scotland's northern climate, becoming an instant hit with audiences. In the programme's early days, it would attract up to a million viewers, representing nearly 20% of the Scottish population at the time.

McColl and Barron's on-screen chemistry and popularity with viewers turned them into celebrities in Scotland, with Beechgrove being parodied on the popular Scottish comedy programme Scotch and Wry. Beechgrove subsequently launching the Beechgrove Gardener's Roadshow, a travelling roadshow and the Beechgrove Potting Shed, a gardening radio programme to reach more gardeners across the country.

McColl continued to co-present Beechgrove for the next 41 years, with a four-year interruption in the late 1980s, when he was "unceremoniously removed" from the programme. He learned of his removal from the programme from a press release, recounting the moment as his only low point on the programme. He was reinstated thanks to co-presenter Carole Baxter.

=== Horticultural advocacy ===
In 1988, he began to campaign for the development of a National Garden for Scotland, similar to the Royal Horticultural Society gardens in England such as Wisley. The project, named "The Calyx" aimed to showcase the best of Scottish gardening and create horticultural jobs. In 2015, after 25 years of campaigning, the project was ultimately shelved after experiencing setbacks and a lack of funding. He cited the failure of the project as one of his biggest regrets.

Beginning in the 1990s, McColl wrote a weekly gardening column for the Aberdeen Press and Journal.

In 2008, at the time of Beechgrove's thirtieth anniversary, McColl criticised the rise of garden makeover shows, arguing that they were leading to the rise of prices in garden centres and misleading viewers, rather than helping them solve problems. In 2012, when the Beechgrove Potting Shed, a 20-year fixture of BBC Radio Scotland was cancelled for cost-cutting measures, he was vocal in his disappointment, describing the decision as "insulting". He regularly advocated for increased recognition of Scotland's horticultural industry, campaigning for gardening's support in horticultural therapy, healthy living and social integration.

=== Retirement ===
McColl retired from Beechgrove in 2019, when diminishing grip strength from neuropathy made it difficult for him to present gardening techniques on the programme. At the time of his retirement, he was the BBC's longest serving gardening presenter.

McColl retired from writing his weekly gardening column in 2022. He died on 22 October 2024, at the age of 89.

== Awards ==
- 1982 Scottish Horticultural Medal
- 1996 Member of the Order of the British Empire for services to horticulture
- 2000 The Royal Horticultural Society Gold Veitch Memorial Medal
- 2003 Fellowship of Royal Agricultural Societies
- 2004 Honorary Fellowship of the Scottish Agricultural College
- 2007 Best Nations and Regions Presenter at the Royal Television Society
- 2008 BAFTA Scotland nomination for "Most Popular Scottish Presenter"
- 2016 Royal Television Society Scotland Award.
- 2020 Victoria Medal of Honour by the Royal Horticultural Society.

== Publications ==
- The Beechgrove Garden: a booklet of advice on vegetable growing by Jim McColl and George Barron. Glasgow. BBC Publications: 1980.
- The Beechgrove Garden: a month-by-month guide to gardening in Scotland by Jim McColl and Carole Baxter. Glasgow. BBC Publications: 1988. ISBN 9780563206767
