= James the Cat =

Scottish animated television series (1984–1988)

- Created by: Kate Canning
- Narrated by: Sean Arnold; Alistair McGowan
- Country of origin: Scotland
- Original language: English
- No. of series: 2
- No. of episodes: 52

Production
- Producer: Jan Clayton
- Running time: 5 minutes
- Production company: Grampian Television

Original release
- Network: ITV
- Release: 10 March 1984 – 24 December 1998

James the Cat is a 1984 Scottish animated children's series created by Kate Canning and produced by Jan Clayton with Grampian Television. It chronicles the many events which take place at the Cornerhouse (number 104) between James and his new animal friends. Fellow characters include Mrs. Lavender, a snail; Frieda, a kangaroo; Citroen, a French frog; Rocky, a dimwitted rabbit; and Dennis, a pink fire-breathing Welsh dragon who originated from China. There is also a beehive in the garden at the Cornerhouse. Next door are Ma and Pa Rat, and their rat children.

== Description ==
The programme changes quite a bit between the two series. In the first, James is a newcomer to the garden at the Cornerhouse, and must learn to live with the other animals there. In the first episode of the second series, James becomes a diplomat (though sometimes he is referred to as a VIP). In subsequent episodes, he and the others travel to distant lands or receive important visitors.

== Home media ==
There were two VHS tapes released by Tempo Video.

VHS Name	Catalogue Number	Release Year	Episodes
James the Cat and Friends	V9005	1987	Friends; Rock Garden; The Corner House; The Inventor; The Takeover; Art Attack; Treasure; The Greedy Caterpillar
Out and About with James the Cat	V9006	1987	Kites; Lunch; James G.P.; The Seaside; Arfur Mark; The Thunderstorm; Sums; The Big Top

Screen Entertainment also released one VHS tape.

VHS Name	Catalogue Number	Release Year	Episodes
James the Cat: Neighbours	SE 9002	1988	Neighbours; Tea for Toad; The Confused Goose; Playground; Bee Bop; Pa Rat's Problem; Water-works; The Dentist; Slim Chance; The Birthday Party

== Reception ==
Common Sense Media described the series as "Sophisti-catted tales best for older preschoolers".
