= Rumster Forest transmitting station =

Broadcasting and telecommunications facility in Scotland

Rumster Forest
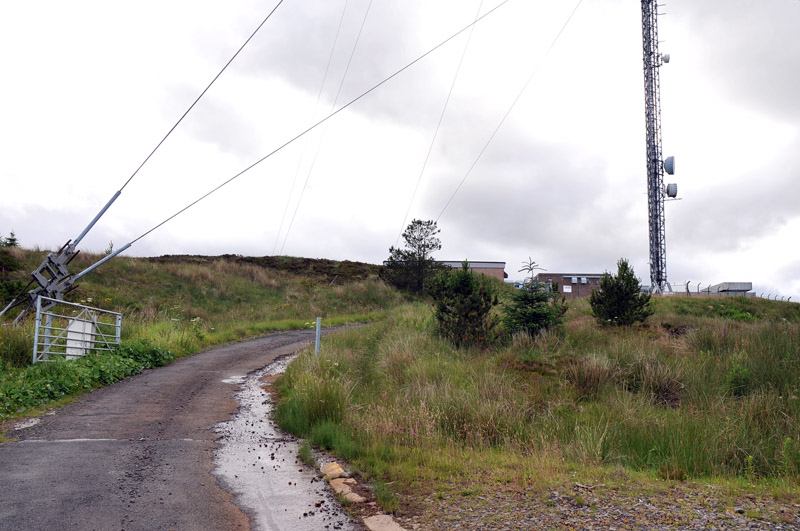

- Location within Highland
- Mast height: 229.2 metres (752 ft)
- Coordinates: 58.328056°N 3.371389°W
- Grid reference: ND197385
- Built: 1965
- BBC region: BBC Scotland
- ITV region: STV North

The Rumster Forest transmitting station is a broadcasting and telecommunications facility near the town of Wick, in Caithness, Scotland (grid reference ND197385). It is owned and operated by Arqiva.

It has a 229.2 metres (752 ft) high guyed steel lattice mast. It was constructed in 1965 and coverage includes north west Scotland, including Caithness and parts of eastern Sutherland. It also serves coastal areas of Moray and Banffshire.

It carries six digital TV multiplexes. It also carries national analogue BBC FM radio, including BBC Radio 1, BBC Radio 2, BBC Radio 3, BBC Radio 4, BBC Radio nan Gàidheal and BBC Radio Scotland.

== Services by frequency ==
=== Analogue radio ===
Frequency	kW	Service
90.1 MHz	10	BBC Radio 2
92.3 MHz	10	BBC Radio 3
94.5 MHz	10	BBC Radio Scotland
95.6 MHz	10	BBC Radio 4
99.7 MHz	10	BBC Radio 1
104.6 MHz	10	BBC Radio nan Gàidheal

=== Digital radio ===
Frequency	Block	kW	Operator
225.648 MHz	12B	10	BBC National DAB

=== Analogue television ===
Analogue television was switched off during June 2010; BBC Two Scotland was closed on 2 June, and the remaining three on 16 June.

Frequency	UHF	kW	Service
471.25 MHz	21	100	Channel 4
495.25 MHz	24	100	STV (North) (Grampian)
519.25 MHz	27	100	BBC Two Scotland
551.25 MHz	31	100	BBC One Scotland

=== Digital television ===
Frequency	UHF	kW	Operator
474.166 MHz	21+	20	BBC B
498.000 MHz	24	20	Digital 3&4
522.000 MHz	27	20	BBC A
562.000 MHz	32	10	SDN
578.000 MHz	34	10	Arqiva A
586.000 MHz	35	10	Arqiva B

==== Before switchover ====
Frequency	UHF	kW	Operator
482.2 MHz	22+	1	Digital 3&4 (Mux 2)
506.2 MHz	25+	2	SDN (Mux A)
530.2 MHz	28+	1	BBC (Mux 1)
562.2 MHz	32+	1	BBC (Mux B)
778.0 MHz	59	2	Arqiva (Mux D)
802.0 MHz	62	2	Arqiva (Mux C)

== See also ==
- List of masts
- List of tallest buildings and structures in Great Britain
- List of radio stations in the United Kingdom
