= BBC Choice Scotland =

- Country: Scotland
- Network: BBC Choice

Ownership
- Owner: BBC Scotland
- Sister channels: BBC One Scotland; BBC Two Scotland

History
- Launched: 23 September 1998; 27 years ago
- Closed: 30 March 2001; 25 years ago
- Replaced by: Digital version of BBC Two Scotland

BBC Choice Scotland was the national variation for BBC Scotland of the BBC Choice service, that was broadcast by the BBC.

== Programming ==
As with the local variants of BBC Choice in Northern Ireland and Wales, BBC Choice Scotland carried much of its content from the network BBC Choice service originating in London, but split off most evenings for around two hours a night (generally around 10pm to midnight) of local programming to Scotland. When the EastEnders rebroadcast aired at 10pm, local programming would begin at 10.30pm. After around midnight, programming would revert to the network service until closedown.

== History ==
The BBC Choice Scotland service launched alongside the other BBC Choice variants on 23 September 1998 as part of an £7 million expansion of BBC Scotland and ceased on 30 March 2001; it was replaced by a fully networked BBC Choice. The channel was then itself replaced from 2003 by BBC Three, which has never had any regional variants. Until 2012 None of the BBC's other digital services offered regional variants. BBC One HD and BBC Two HD at launch didn't have any regional variants. BBC One HD started offering regional services in 2012 with the launch of BBC One Northern Ireland HD, followed by BBC One Scotland HD and BBC One Wales HD in January 2013, English regional variants of BBC One HD started in 2023. BBC Two HD launched regional variants in 2018 for Wales and Northern Ireland whilst both England and Scotland receive the network BBC Two as BBC Two Scotland was closed down in early 2019 and replaced with BBC Scotland, a channel dedicated to Scottish programming.

Following the closure of BBC Choice's regional variants in 2001, BBC Two's variants for Scotland, Wales and Northern Ireland were made available to digital viewers (previously a single UK-wide version of BBC Two had been available on digital platforms).
