= Rosemarkie transmitting station =

Transmitter station in Highland, Scotland

Rosemarkie
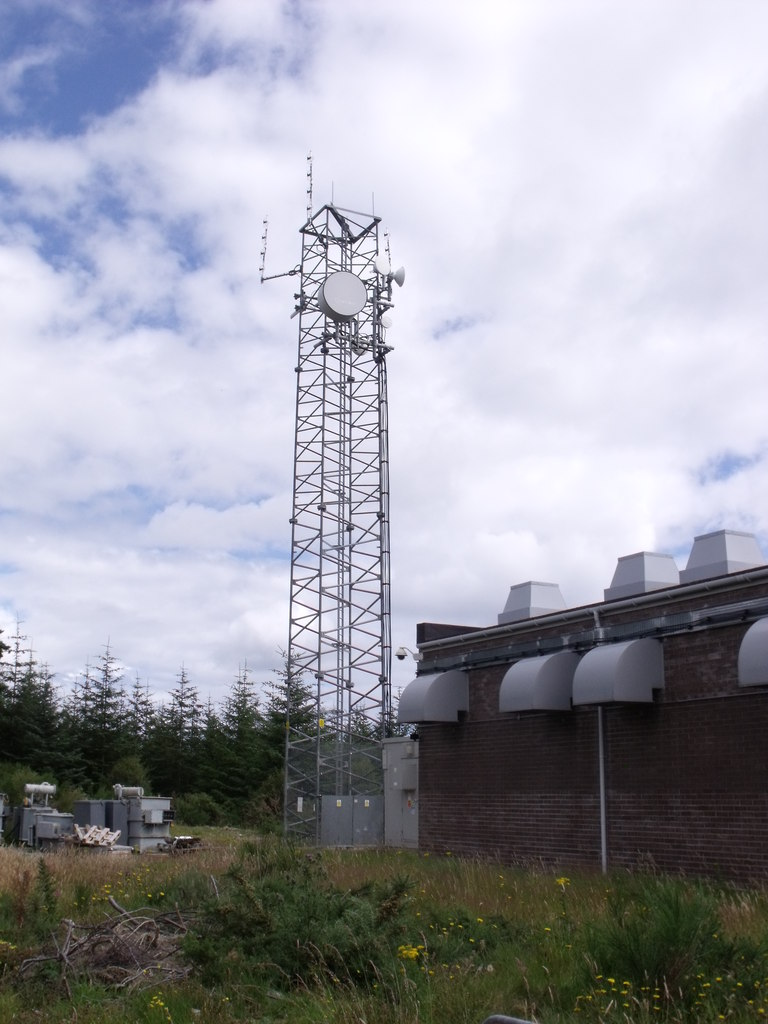

- Location within Highland
- Location: Rosemarkie, Highland
- Mast height: 110 metres (361 ft)
- Coordinates: 57.634048°N 4.074274°W
- Grid reference: NH762623
- Built: 1957
- BBC region: BBC Scotland
- ITV region: STV North

The Rosemarkie transmitting station is a broadcasting and telecommunications facility, situated close to the town of Rosemarkie, Scotland, in Highland (grid reference NH762623). It consists of a 110 metres (361 ft) high guyed steel lattice mast erected on land that is itself about 210 m above sea level only a few hundred metres from the coast of the Moray Firth. It is owned and operated by Arqiva.

== Coverage ==
Coverage includes the areas around the Moray Firth, in the Highland region of Scotland, including up to Helmsdale in the north, Elgin to the east, Dingwall to the west and the northern shores of Loch Ness to the south. This also includes the city of Inverness.

== History ==
The station was built in 1957 by the BBC to bring BBC Television to North East Scotland for the first time. The 405-line monochrome transmissions were on channel 2, Band I VHF.

When colour UHF television began in 1970, the site was chosen over the nearby IBA owned station at Mounteagle to carry these broadcasts. Both the UHF and VHF services continued in tandem until 1985, when VHF television was discontinued in the UK.

== Channels listed by frequency ==
=== Digital television ===
==== 20 October 2010 – present ====
Digital switchover was completed at Rosemarkie. All analogue television was switched off and the new post-DSO multiplexes took over the analogue frequencies plus a few new ones.

Frequency	UHF	kW	Operator
618.000 MHz	39	20	Digital 3&4
626.000 MHz	40	10	Arqiva B
642.000 MHz	42	20	BBC B
650.000 MHz	43	10	SDN
666.000 MHz	45	20	BBC A
674.000 MHz	46	10	Arqiva A

=== Analogue radio (FM) ===
Frequency	kW	Service
89.6 MHz	10	BBC Radio 2
91.8 MHz	10	BBC Radio 3
94.0 MHz	10	BBC Radio Scotland
99.2 MHz	10	BBC Radio 1
103.6 MHz	10	BBC Radio 4
104.9 MHz	10	BBC Radio nan Gaidheal

== Former Services ==
=== Analogue television ===
==== 16 August 1957 – 11 July 1970 ====
405-line BBC television arrived in the northeast of Scotland.

Frequency	VHF	kW	Service
51.75 MHz	2H	20	BBC1 Scotland

==== 11 July 1970 – October 1973 ====
BBC Two UHF colour television commenced.

Frequency	VHF	UHF	kW	Service
51.75 MHz	2H	—	20	BBC1 Scotland
663.25 MHz	—	45	100	BBC2 Scotland

==== October 1973 – 1 November 1982 ====
BBC One and ITV UHF colour television commenced.

Frequency	VHF	UHF	kW	Service
51.75 MHz	2H	—	20	BBC1 Scotland
615.25 MHz	—	39	100	BBC1 Scotland
663.25 MHz	—	45	100	BBC2 Scotland
695.25 MHz	—	49	100	Grampian Television

==== 2 November 1982 – 3 January 1985 ====
The UK's fourth UHF television channel started up.

Frequency	VHF	UHF	kW	Service
51.75 MHz	2H	—	20	BBC1 Scotland
615.25 MHz	—	39	100	BBC1 Scotland
639.25 MHz	—	42	100	Channel 4
663.25 MHz	—	45	100	BBC2 Scotland
695.25 MHz	—	49	100	Grampian Television

==== 3 January 1985 – 15 November 1998 ====
The VHF 405-line system was discontinued across the UK, and from that point for the next 23 years, television from Rosemarkie was the originally-intended four channels on UHF only.

Frequency	UHF	kW	Service
615.25 MHz	39	100	BBC1 Scotland
639.25 MHz	42	100	Channel 4
663.25 MHz	45	100	BBC2 Scotland
695.25 MHz	49	100	Grampian Television

=== Analogue and Digital television ===
==== 15 November 1998 – 6 October 2010 ====
The initial roll-out of digital television involved running the digital services interleaved (and at low ERP) with the existing analogue services.

Frequency	UHF	kW	Service	System
615.25 MHz	39	100	BBC One Scotland	PAL
633.833 MHz	41-	10	SDN (Mux A)	DVB-T
639.25 MHz	42	100	Channel 4	PAL
657.833 MHz	44-	10	BBC (Mux B)	DVB-T
663.25 MHz	45	100	BBC Two Scotland	PAL
674.166 MHz	46+	8	Arqiva (Mux C)	DVB-T
682.166 MHz	47+	10	BBC (Mux 1)	DVB-T
695.25 MHz	49	100	STV (North) (Grampian)	PAL
706.166 MHz	50+	8	Arqiva (Mux D)	DVB-T
714.166 MHz	51+	10	Digital 3&4 (Mux 2)	DVB-T

==== 6 October 2010 – 20 October 2010 ====
Digital Switchover commenced at Rosemarkie, with analogue BBC Two being switched off on UHF 45 and BBC Mux 1 being switched off on channel 47+. Channel 45 was reused by the new BBC A multiplex at full post-DSO power (20 kW) and using 64-QAM with 8k carriers.

Frequency	UHF	kW	Service	System
615.25 MHz	39	100	BBC One Scotland	PAL
633.833 MHz	41-	10	SDN (Mux A)	DVB-T
639.25 MHz	42	100	Channel 4	PAL
657.833 MHz	44-	10	BBC (Mux B)	DVB-T
666.000 MHz	45	20	BBC A	DVB-T
674.166 MHz	46+	8	Arqiva (Mux C)	DVB-T
695.25 MHz	49	100	STV (North)	PAL
706.166 MHz	50+	8	Arqiva (Mux D)	DVB-T
714.166 MHz	51+	10	Digital 3&4 (Mux 2)	DVB-T

== See also ==
- List of masts
- List of tallest buildings and structures in Great Britain
- List of radio stations in the United Kingdom
