= Bill Torrance =

Scottish broadcaster

William Torrance (born 13 May 1946) is a Scottish broadcaster and entertainer who is known for hosting The Beechgrove Garden on BBC Scotland throughout the 1990s. Torrance was also a presenter on Dundee radio station Tay 2.
