= The Scottish Golf Show =

- Genre: Sport, Golf
- Narrated by: Iain Anderson
- Country of origin: Scotland
- No. of series: 1
- No. of episodes: 7

Production
- Running time: 30 minutes (including adverts)
- Production companies: Grampian Television; Midas Multimedia

Original release
- Network: STV
- Release: 2005

The Scottish Golf Show is a Scottish television series aired on Scottish TV and Grampian TV (now both together as STV).

The Scottish Golf Show was narrated by Iain Anderson and produced, directed & edited by Scott Brown. The series was first broadcast in 2005, and was re-aired in 2006, and again in May 2009 on STV.

== Synopsis ==
=== Episode 1 ===
The first episode provides an overview of Scotland's golf courses, beginning with St Andrews. Royal and Ancient Golf Club of St Andrews opens its doors, and the origins of the game are explored at the British Golf Museum.

=== Episode 2 ===
This edition features one of Scotland's premier venues, the championship course at Royal Troon, and looks at some of the other major courses in Ayrshire.

=== Episode 3 ===
This edition features the Open Championship venue at Carnoustie, and others at the east coast.

=== Episode 4 ===
The show visits Royal Dornoch. Graeme Baxter talks about the art of golf, and takes a look behind the scenes at Elmwood College, Fife.

=== Episode 5 ===
The Scottish Golf Show opens with some action at Gleneagles, Perthshire.

=== Episode 6 ===
This edition opens at Turnberry, Ayrshire, where Colin Montgomerie shows his Links Golf Academy.

=== Episode 7 ===
Shows the oldest golf club in the world, Muirfield, home of the Honourable Company of Edinburgh Golfers.

== Reception ==
Regarding the absence of sustained media attention on lower-tier Scottish golf competitions, Stuart Bathgate of The Scotsman wrote that the show "offers an indication of what could be done, with a little imagination and a modest budget, to redress this imbalance". Commenting on Iain Anderson's performance, Bathgate thought that "while he narrates with sonorous relish, his voice is partly responsible for making the programme bear too close a resemblance to a promotional video shot by Visit Scotland and shipped out to rich Americans". In a mixed review, Evening Express said, "This programme is an excellent and well-produced video for golf tourists. For peak-time viewing, however, it lands in the rough."
