= Telefios =

Scottish television series

Telefios was a Scottish Gaelic-language news programme, broadcast on both Grampian Television and Scottish Television from 4 January 1993 until 2000.

Its name is a portmanteau of the word fios meaning "knowledge" or "information", and telebhisean ("television").

Although not strictly a local news bulletin, the programme concentrated mainly on Western Isles news, and specifically Gaelic interest news stories from elsewhere.

Five-minute bulletins were shown on weekday lunchtimes (and later, in the early evening) while a supplementary half-hour review programme, Telefios na Seachduinn, was broadcast on Saturday lunchtime.

== Other Scottish Gaelic news programmes ==
It is sometimes wrongly stated that Telefios was actually the first Scottish Gaelic news programme. In fact, Criomagan (meaning "little bits") was broadcast during the late 1980s and early 1990s by Grampian Television.

Following the axing of Telefios in 2000, no Scots Gaelic television news programmes were broadcast until September 2008 when the Gaelic digital channel, BBC Alba, launched a nightly half-hour programme entitled An Là and a weekly hour-long review programme entitled Seachd Là.
