= Durris transmitting station =

Transmitter in Aberdeenshire, Scotland

Durris

- Location within Aberdeenshire
- Mast height: 322.0 metres (1,056 ft)
- Coordinates: 57°N 2.39°W
- Built: 1966
- BBC region: BBC Scotland
- ITV region: STV North

The Durris transmitting station is a broadcasting and telecommunications facility, situated close to the town of Stonehaven, within Durris Forest, located precisely at the 57th parallel north, within the area also known historically as Kincardineshire (grid reference NO763899). It is owned and operated by Arqiva, and is the tallest structure in Scotland.

== History ==
It is also a feature in Durris Primary School's newest logo created in 2000 (the logo shows the mast on the hill with the sun and three trees).

It can be seen from the summit of Mither Tap, near Insch, Aberdeenshire and can also be spotted at night on the road down from the Lecht Ski Centre.

=== Construction ===
It has a 306.6 metres (1,006 ft) high guyed steel lattice mast, built by J. L. Eve Construction. It was constructed in 1966. 38-year-old Thomas Sutherland of Blairgowrie died in its construction on Monday 24 October 1966, falling 175 ft from 300 ft up the mast; the company had a regional office in Edinburgh

=== Transmissions ===
Its coverage includes north east Scotland, from St. Andrews in the south to Fraserburgh in the north, including the city of Aberdeen. It also covers much of the North Sea coast between Dunbar and Berwick, although this coverage is not deliberate.

The analogue television transmission antennas surmounting the structure are contained within a GRP cylinder, and bring the overall height of the structure to 322.0 metres (1,056 ft), making it the tallest structure in Scotland.

== Services listed by frequency ==
=== Analogue radio (FM VHF) ===
Frequency	kW	Service
89.4 MHz	2.1	BBC Radio 2
91.6 MHz	2.1	BBC Radio 3
93.8 MHz	2.1	BBC Radio Scotland
95.9 MHz	2.1	BBC Radio 4
96.9 MHz	10	Northsound 1
99.0 MHz	2.1	BBC Radio 1
100.5 MHz	10	Classic FM
106.8 MHz	10	Original 106

=== Digital radio (DAB) ===
Frequency	Block	kW	Operator
220.35 MHz	11C	2	Switchdigital
223.93 MHz	12A	10	Digital One
225.64 MHz	12B	10	BBC National DAB

=== Analogue television ===
Analogue television was switched off during September 2010; BBC Two Scotland was closed on 1 September and the remaining four on 15 September.

Frequency	UHF	kW	Service
479.25 MHz	22	500	BBC One Scotland
503.25 MHz	25	500	STV (North) (Grampian)
527.25 MHz	28	500	BBC Two Scotland
559.25 MHz	32	500	Channel 4
839.25 MHz	67	100	Channel 5

=== Digital television ===
==== 30 September 2018 - present ====
Frequency	UHF	kW	Operator
482.0 MHz	22	100	BBC B
490.0 MHz	23	50	SDN
506.0 MHz	25	100	Digital 3&4
514.0 MHz	26	50	Arqiva A
530.0 MHz	28	100	BBC A
546.0 MHz	30	50	Arqiva B
634.0 MHz	41	10	Local (That's TV)

==== 15 June 2011 - 30 September 2018 ====
Frequency	UHF	kW	Operator
482.0 MHz	22	100	BBC B
490.0 MHz	23	50	SDN
506.0 MHz	25	100	Digital 3&4
514.0 MHz	26	50	Arqiva A
530.0 MHz	28	100	BBC A
538.0 MHz	29	50	Arqiva B
562.0 MHz	32	14.5	COM7 HD
586.0 MHz	35	14.5	COM8 HD

==== 15 September 2010 - 15 June 2011 ====
Frequency	UHF	kW	Operator
482.0 MHz	22	100	BBC B
506.0 MHz	25	100	Digital 3&4
530.0 MHz	28	100	BBC A
634.0 MHz	41†	5	Arqiva A
714.0 MHz	51†	10	Arqiva B
722.0 MHz	52†	20	SDN

† Temporary channel to avoid interference with Craigkelly transmitter.

==== Before switchover (until 15 September 2010) ====
Frequency	UHF	kW	Operator
546.0 MHz	30	20	BBC (Mux 1)
578.0 MHz	34	20	Digital 3&4 (Mux 2)
634.0 MHz	41	5	Arqiva (Mux C)
658.0 MHz	44	5	Arqiva (Mux D)
713.8 MHz	51-	10	BBC (Mux B)
722.2 MHz	52+	20	SDN (Mux A)

== See also ==
- List of masts
- List of radio stations in the United Kingdom
- List of tallest buildings and structures in Great Britain
