= Mounteagle transmitting station =

Broadcasting and telecommunications facility near Fortrose, Scotland

Mounteagle
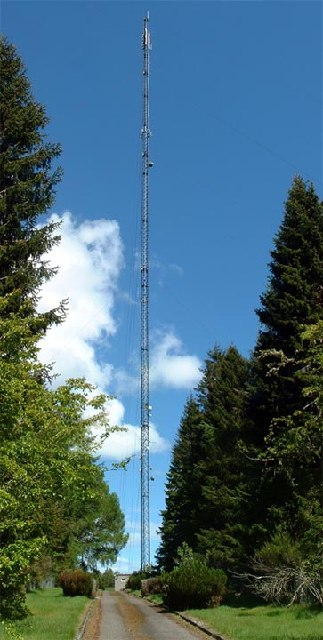
- Mounteagle mast

- Location within Highland
- Location: Fortrose, Highland
- Mast height: 243.8 metres (800 ft)
- Coordinates: 57.591667°N 4.276667°W
- Grid reference: NH639580
- Built: 1961
- ITV region: Grampian Television (1961-1985)

The Mounteagle transmitting station is a broadcasting and telecommunications facility, situated close to the town of Fortrose, Scotland, in Highland (grid reference NH639580). It includes a 243.8 metres (800 ft) high guyed steel lattice mast. It is owned and operated by Arqiva.

== Coverage ==
Coverage includes the areas around the Moray Firth, in the Highland region of Scotland, including up to Helmsdale in the north, Elgin to the east, Dingwall to the west and the northern shores of Loch Ness to the south. This also includes the city of Inverness.

== History ==
The station was built in 1961 by the Independent Television Authority to bring ITV to North East Scotland for the first time. Inaugural broadcasts were from the ITV franchise holder for the area, Grampian Television. 405-line monochrome transmissions were on channel 12, Band III VHF. The station was also the first in the area to broadcast television using Band III.

When colour UHF television began in 1969, the nearby BBC owned station at Rosemarkie was chosen over Mounteagle to carry these broadcasts. Both the UHF and VHF services continued in tandem until 1985, when VHF television was discontinued in the UK. At this point, Mounteagle ceased broadcasting television services entirely.

In 1982 Mounteagle was chosen as the site of the first commercial radio broadcasts in northern Scotland, with Moray Firth Radio taking to the air on 23 February of that year.

In 1996 transmitters for Classic FM were added, and then later in 1997 Mounteagle began broadcasting television services again, when transmitters were installed for the launch of Channel 5. Digital switchover occurred in the Inverness area in October 2010, and at this point the Channel 5 service was discontinued, and now broadcasts digitally from the nearby Rosemarkie transmitter site.

More recently the station has become the first in the area to carry digital radio broadcasts, with the addition of transmitters for Digital One, BBC and Score Inverness.

== Channels listed by frequency ==
=== Analogue radio (VHF FM) ===
Frequency	kW		Service
Frequency	H	V	Service
97.4 MHz	1.25	5	MFR
101.4 MHz	2.2	8.8	Classic FM

=== Digital radio (DAB) ===
Frequency	Block	kW	Operator
218.64 MHz	11B	10	Score Inverness
223.94 MHz	12A	10	Digital One
225.65 MHz	12B	10	BBC National DAB

=== Analogue television ===
==== 30 September 1961 - 3 January 1985 ====
Frequency	VHF	kW	Service
209.75 MHz	12	50	Grampian

==== 30 March 1997 - 20 October 2010 ====
Frequency	UHF	kW	Service
839.25 MHz	67	100	Channel 5

== See also ==
- List of masts
- List of tallest buildings and structures in Great Britain
- List of radio stations in the United Kingdom
