= Beechgrove (TV series) =

Television series about gardening in Scotland

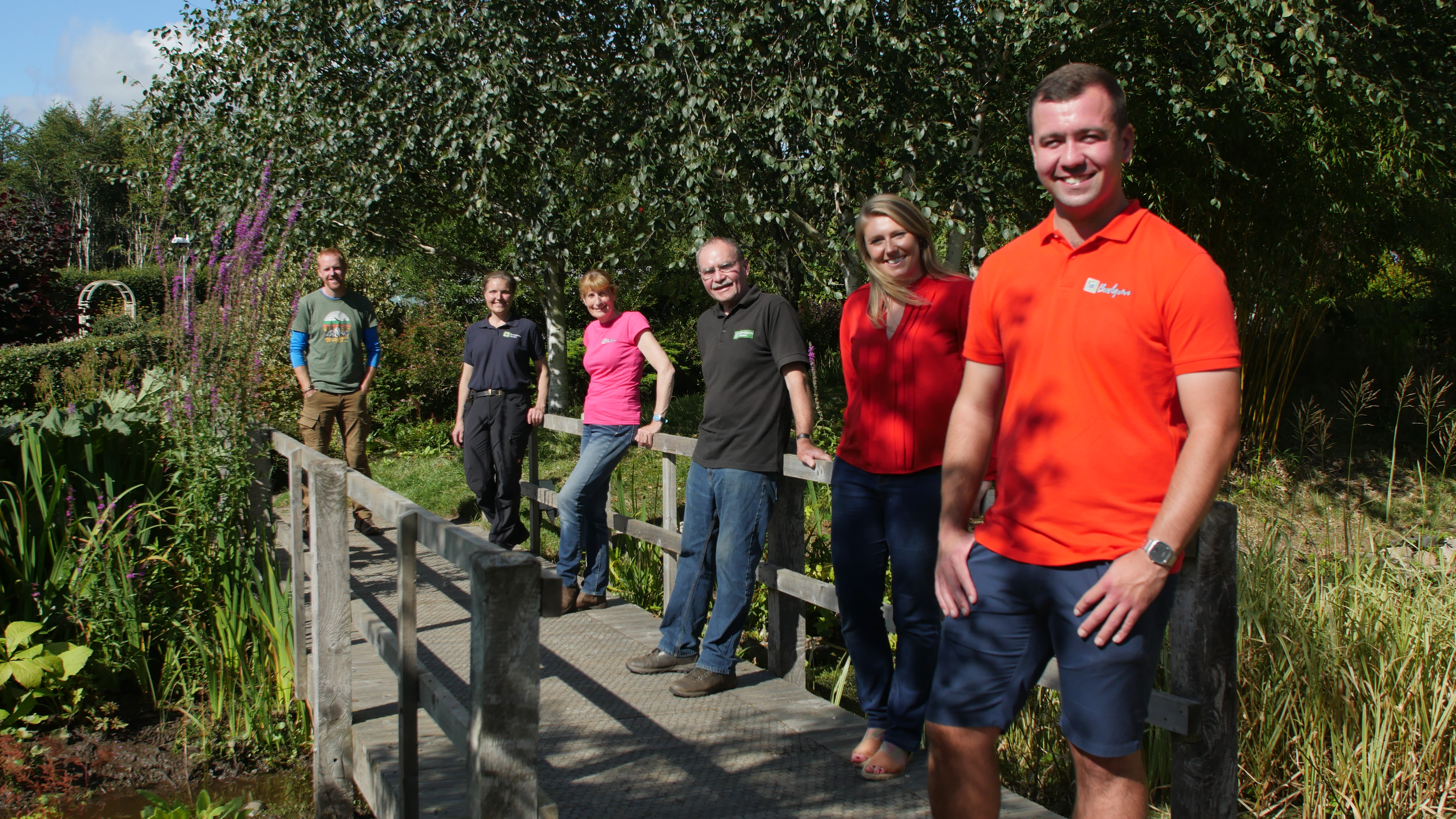
- Beechgrove presenters Brian Cunningham, Mairi Rattray, Carole Baxter, George Anderson, Kirsty Wilson and Calum Clunie
- Also known as: The Beechgrove Gardens, The Beechgrove Garden
- Created by: BBC Scotland
- Country of origin: Scotland
- Original language: English

Production
- Producer: Tern Television
- Running time: 28 minutes

Original release
- Network: BBC Scotland; BBC Two Scotland; BBC One Scotland
- Release: 14 April 1978 – present

Beechgrove (formerly known as The Beechgrove Garden) is a television gardening programme broadcast since 1978 on BBC Scotland. Over the years it has been broadcast on BBC Scotland, BBC One Scotland, BBC Two Scotland and Britbox.

== History ==
Beechgrove is a gardening programme, which started on 14 April 1978. It was inspired by the garden behind the home of WGBH in Boston, Massachusetts, named the Victory Garden. The original plot of land used was the small area of garden attached to the BBC studios in Beechgrove Terrace, Aberdeen. Due to its small size, the programme's popularity and the fact the garden had been transformed several times over, a new area of ground to the west of Aberdeen was acquired for the programme by Tern Television who have produced the series since 1992. The new site covers 2.5 acres and is located at the former Grampian Regional Council Brotherfield Nursery, in Westhill, Aberdeenshire. Episodes were broadcast from the site in 1996. In June 1983, the 100th show was broadcast.

Since the 1980s, The Beechgrove Garden has been shown intermittently on the BBC across the UK usually in a non-prime time slot; however, since 2021 it has been shown on BBC 2 in a prime Friday night slot. Since 2013 The Beechgrove Garden has been broadcast in the rest of the UK, usually early on a Sunday morning slot.

In 1990, the garden was redeveloped, which meant uprooting everything and starting again. It caused an outcry from the press and public, but it went ahead and led to a public auction for keepsake plants from The Beechgrove. Six years later the garden moved from its original home to an exposed, rural hillside on the outskirts of Aberdeen.

The 1,000th episode was filmed in May 2016. During the COVID-19 pandemic and the subsequent lockdown, the presenters filmed episodes from their own gardens. George Anderson was filming in his home in Joppa, Edinburgh. Kirsty Wilson was presenting from her flat in Edinburgh, Brian Cunningham was in his garden in Scone and Carole Baxter will film from her garden in Aberdeenshire. 2022 was the 30th year of production company, 'Tern' producing Beechgrove for BBC Scotland.

== Theme ==
The theme tune for the show since 1990 is the jig "Miss Tara MacAdam", written by Phil Cunningham and performed with band Relativity and the music feature on their album Gathering Pace. There have been a few versions of the theme over the years used in the show. This replaced the show's original theme tune, "Sponge" by Magna Carta.

== Presenters ==
The current presenters are:

- Carole Baxter (1986–current)
- George Anderson (2005–current)
- Brian Cunningham (2015–current)
- Kirsty Wilson (2019–current)
- Calum Clunie (2021–current)
- Scott Smith (2023– current)

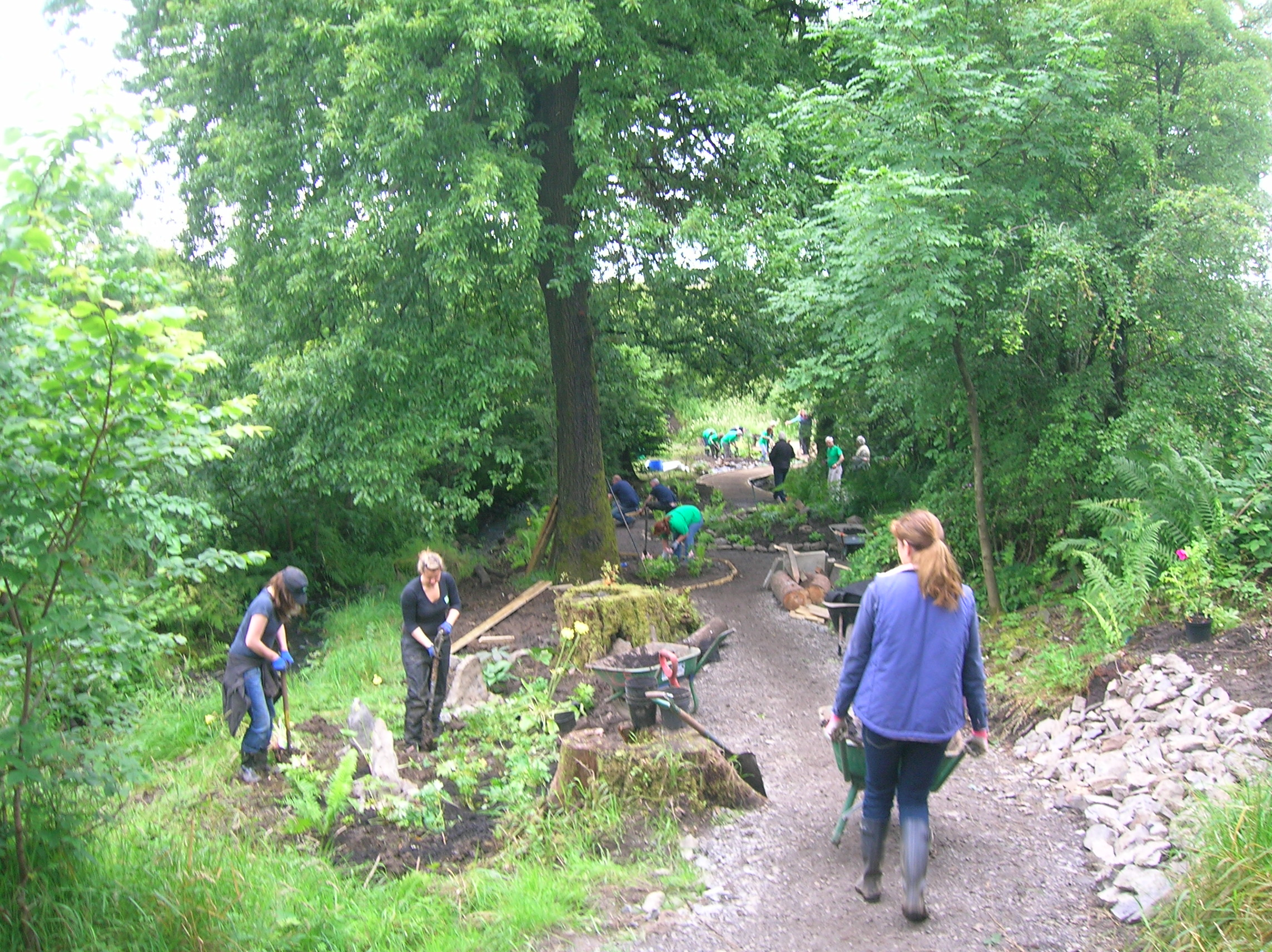
Beechgrove presenter and team working on the Vale View Garden project in Barrmill, North Ayrshire.

Previous presenters on the programme included:

- Jim McColl (1978–1989, 1994–2019)
- George Barron (1978–1984)
- Dick Gardiner (1984–1985)
- Sid Robertson (1990–1994)
- Bill Torrance (1990–1999)
- Walter Gilmour (1984–)
- Jim McKirdy. (1984–)
- Carolyn Spray (1995–2014)
- Lesley Watson (1995–2013)
- Chris Beardshaw (2013–2021)

== Programme side-shoots ==
=== Hit Squad ===
In 1992, The Hit Squad with Jim McKirdy and Walter Gilmour was launched. They travelled around Scotland every week giving individual gardens a makeover a few years before England's Ground Force stole the idea. They remained on the show until 1999 after doing over 200 gardens.

=== Beechgrove Repotted ===
Beechgrove Repotted is one of Beechgrove's side-shoots. Repotted is a 2019 series of reversions that have been moulded to form a series of programmes which all explore a specific gardening theme. Themes include:

- gardening on a budget
- garden art
- community allotments
- garden therapy
- gardening for wildlife
- urban gardens
- growing gardening communities

=== The Beechgrove Potting Shed ===
A sister programme, The Beechgrove Potting Shed, was broadcast weekly on BBC Radio Scotland between 1978 and 2012. Presented in its latter years by Theresa Talbot, it was axed as part of a cost-cutting measure by the station.
