= BBC Two Scotland =

British television channel

- Final logo, used from 2007 to 2019.
- Country: United Kingdom
- Network: BBC Two

Programming
- Picture format: 576i (16:9 SDTV)

Ownership
- Owner: BBC Scotland
- Sister channels: BBC One Scotland; BBC Alba

History
- Launched: 9 July 1966; 60 years ago 30 March 2001; 25 years ago (digital version)
- Replaced: BBC Choice Scotland (Digital version)
- Closed: 17 February 2019; 7 years ago 31 December 2010; 15 years ago (digital version)
- Replaced by: BBC Scotland
- Former names: BBC 2 Scotland (9 July 1966 – 16 February 1991); BBC Scotland On 2 (16 February 1991 – 4 October 1997)

Availability

Terrestrial
- Freeview: Channel 2

BBC Two Scotland was a Scottish free-to-air television channel owned and operated by BBC Scotland as a variation of the BBC Two network. It is broadcast via digital television and is the sister Scottish channel of BBC One Scotland and Gaelic-language BBC Alba. Unlike BBC One Scotland, which broadcasts its own continuity with only rare exceptions, BBC Two Scotland would opt in and out of BBC Two network continuity throughout the day.

== History ==
At the end of June 1965, in response to a question in the House of Commons, the Assistant Postmaster General, Joseph Slater, announced that the first BBC2 UHF station in Scotland was expected to open at Black Hill that December, with a second station at Durris serving the north-east towards the end of the following year, or soon after. Further stations were planned to extend BBC2 to the rest of Scotland, but it was too early to determine when they were likely to open.

However, bad weather delayed the project and the completion date was put back to the Spring of 1966.

The BBC2 transmitter at Blackhill finally went into full service on 9 July 1966, broadcasting to a potential audience of 2.3 million. The programme schedule that evening began at 7pm with the channel's controller, David Attenborough, introducing BBC-2 to Scotland, followed by Pick of the Month, in which Denis Tuohy and Joan Bakewell choose and introduced highlights from some of the programmes seen on BBC2 during June. It was followed by the first half of a dramatisation of Walter Scott's The Heart of Midlothian at 8pm, recorded in the BBC's Queen Margaret Drive studios in Glasgow. At 10:05pm, The Sport Scene with David Vine, included highlights of the final day of golf's Open Championship at Muirfield, East Lothian.

Attenborough said at a news conference at the time of launching the service to Scotland that with Scotland a higher percentage of university students than England, there was an unlikely chance that the channel was deemed to be too highbrow.

Prior to digital switchover, 'BBC Two Scotland' and 'BBC Two Scotland (Digital)' were listed as separate channels by some guides, but were effectively the same channel, broadcasting identical feeds as part of the transition to digital television.

On 24 February 2019, the BBC launched the BBC Scotland channel, a new autonomous service that broadcasts a nightly lineup of Scottish programming. In preparation for its launch, BBC Two Scotland was discontinued and replaced by the national version beginning 18 February. BBC Scotland officially broadcasts from 19:00 to 00:00 nightly, but simulcasts most BBC Two content daily from 12:00 to 19:00, and may opt out for sport and political broadcasts of regional interest during this period. BBC Two Scotland remained on the Sky EPG on channel 970 until 28 February 2019.

In October 2026, the BBC announced that the BBC Scotland channel would be discontinued in 2027, and that selected programmes (such as Friday-night Scottish Championship football) would move to the BBC Two network thereafter—also indirectly confirming that a regional variant of BBC Two for Scotland would be reinstated with some content airing exclusively on BBC Two Scotland.

== Programming ==
Similarly to BBC One Scotland, BBC Two Scotland offered differing programming from the UK-wide network specifically aimed at Scottish viewers. Often, this was more specialised programming such as Artworks Scotland, Holyrood Live and the Gaelic strands branded as BBC Two (Dhà) Alba.

During the daytime and overnight schedules, BBC Scotland replaced some of the national education programming for shows better targeted at the separate Scottish education system and replacing some politics strands with coverage of Scottish politics. BBC Sport Scotland would sometimes use BBC Two Scotland to broadcast live coverage of more minority sports, such as athletics and shinty, with some sports such as mountain biking and cross-country showcased in The Adventure Show.

Additionally, on Sunday nights, BBC Two Scotland had become the regular home for Sportscene's highlights of the SPFL, preceding Match of the Day 2.

The Music Show was launched on BBC Two Scotland in November 2005, presented by Shantha Roberts. Its programming included live performances from a wide range of musical styles, with bands filmed around the country at different venues and unusual locations, rather than in the studio. Musical styles included indie, jazz, folk, funk, hip hop and electro pop. Its last shows were broadcast in November 2014.

Other examples of BBC Two Scotland programmes include:

- ArtWorks Scotland
- Cunntas
- Dè a-nis?
- Holyrood Live
- Landward
- Limmy's Show
- Na Bleigeardan (Gaelic dub of Little Monsters)
- Newsnight Scotland
- Daily Politics Scotland
- Rathad an Sutha (Gaelic due of 64 Zoo Lane)
- Scotland 2016
- Sport Nation
- Sportscene
- The Adventure Show
- Wildlife Detectives
