= BBC One Scotland =

- Logo used since 2021
- Country: United Kingdom
- Broadcast area: Scotland
- Network: BBC One

Programming
- Language: English
- Picture format: 1080i HDTV (downscaled to 16:9 576i for the SDTV feed)

Ownership
- Owner: BBC Scotland
- Sister channels: BBC Alba; BBC Scotland

History
- Launched: 14 March 1952; 73 years ago
- Former names: BBC TV Service Scotland (1952–1964); BBC 1 Scotland (1964–1983; 1985–1991); BBC Scotland (1983–1985); BBC Scotland On 1 (1991–1997)

Availability

Terrestrial
- Freeview: Channel 1 (SD); Channel 101 (HD)

Streaming media
- BBC iPlayer

BBC One Scotland is a Scottish free-to-air television channel owned and operated by BBC Scotland. It is the Scottish variation of the UK-wide BBC One network and is broadcast from Pacific Quay in Glasgow.

== History ==
The BBC Television Service started broadcasts to Scotland on 14 March 1952 using the 405-line television system broadcast from the Kirk o'Shotts transmitter, four weeks after England saw television pictures from Scotland with the funeral of King George VI on 15 February. The first programme, Television Comes to Scotland, was relayed on the English transmitters, featuring a dedicatory prayer, a vote of thanks from Lord Provost of Edinburgh and a ten-minute dancing segment. The inaugural speeches didn't go well in London, but the entertainment output over time received praise. The Television Newsreel that day was led by the launch of the service in Scotland.

Expansion of the service was first planned in 1954 with the building of a transmitter in Inverness; accomplished by the opening of the Rosemarkie transmitting station on 14 August 1957, extending reception to the Highlands. By 1962, there were plans for television news interview studios in Edinburgh and Aberdeen, followed by the building of transmitters in Shetland and Ballachulish. Further transmitters were commissioned in 1964 to increase coverage in the Shetland Islands and South West Scotland. Colour broadcasts started with the network output in 1969; with the conversion of BBC Scotland's Queen Margaret Drive Studio "A" in Glasgow in 1971, Scottish programming followed suit.

On 1 December 1980, BBC1 Scotland broadcast the Radiovision project delivering a simulcast of BBC Radio Scotland's breakfast programme. This was the first breakfast television programme broadcast by BBC1 in any part of the UK, after the short-lived attempt by Yorkshire Television in 1977.

== Presentation ==
For all of the time the channel is referred to on screen as BBC One Scotland, sometimes using overlays to replace the normal channel identifier. The station also has its own team of continuity announcers, provided by BBC Scotland, to accommodate for the variations seen in Scotland from the rest of the BBC One network, whilst also providing the channel with an added Scottish identity. The announcers, based in Glasgow, also double up as transmission directors.

BBC One Scotland updated its visual presentation style as part of the network BBC One revamp on 7 October 2006. The presentation style fits in with the national BBC One 'Circle' idents, but with the "Scotland" caption added to the network logo.

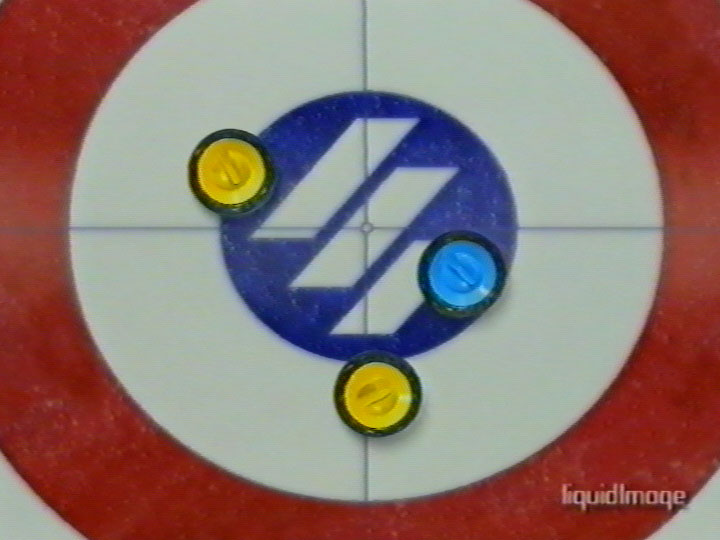
BBC One Scotland 'Curling' ident from the nineties by Liquid Image

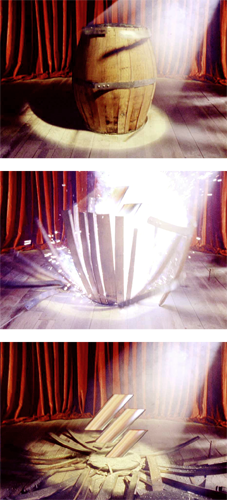
'Barrel of laughs' BBC One Scotland nineties ident by Liquid Image

== Availability ==
An HD (high-definition) simulcast of BBC One Scotland launched on 14 January 2013 on Freeview, Freesat, Sky and Virgin Media. On 10 December 2013, BBC One Scotland HD was swapped with the SD channel on Sky's EPG for HD subscribers.

== Programming ==
BBC One Scotland is responsible for covering certain special events such as the annual Hogmanay Live programme which sees in the New Year, and major Scottish sporting events such as football internationals, the Scottish Cup, Scotland's Six Nations rugby union campaigns, and the performance of Scottish competitors at the Commonwealth Games and Olympic Games. In the earlier days of digital satellite, BBC One Scotland blacked out certain sporting events and highlights shows as some events' rights were held by Sky and other UK broadcasters.

Whilst generally following the schedules of the UK-wide BBC One, BBC One Scotland offers programming specific to Scotland, such as soap opera River City and football programme Sportscene. As a result of this, regular BBC One shows, such as Holby City, are scheduled at different regular times in Scotland, compared with the rest of the UK.

News, Sport and Weather specifically for Scotland are examples of the channel's distinct output.

Examples of BBC One Scotland programmes include:

- BBC Scotland Investigates
- The Beechgrove Garden
- Debate Night
- Reporting Scotland
- River City
- Sportscene
- The Scheme
- Still Game
- Scot Squad
- Two Doors Down
