= Glasgow Gaelic =

Accent of Scottish Gaelic

- Gaelic of Glasgow; Gaelic
- Scottish Gaelic: Gàidhlig Ghlaschu
- Native to: United Kingdom of Great Britain and Northern Ireland
- Region: Scotland
- Ethnicity: Scottish people
- Native speakers: 5,739
- Language family: Indo-European: Celtic; Insular Celtic; Goidelic; Mid-Minch Gaelic; Glasgow Gaelic
- Early forms: Proto-Indo-European: Proto-Celtic; Proto-Goidelic; Primitive Irish; Old Irish; Middle Irish; Early Modern Irish; Scottish Gaelic

Language codes
- ISO 639-3: –

Glasgow Gaelic is an emerging accent of Mid-Minch Gaelic. Around 10% of Scottish Gaelic speakers in Scotland are in Glasgow, second only to the Western Isles in concentration.

Glasgow Gaelic emerged due to Scottish Gaelic-medium education as well as a migration from the Outer Hebrides to Glasgow.

In 2019 urban poet Niall O'Gallagher was appointed Bàrd Baile Ghlaschu, or as the City of Glasgow's first ever Gaelic language Poet Laureate.
