= Mid-Minch Gaelic =

Variety of Scottish Gaelic

- Gàidhlig meadhan na mara
- Region: Northwest Highlands, Western Isles
- Language family: Indo-European: Celtic; Insular Celtic; Goidelic; Scottish Gaelic; Mid-Minch Gaelic
- Early forms: Primitive Irish: Old Irish; Middle Irish
- Dialects: Glasgow Gaelic
- Writing system: Scottish Gaelic orthography (Latin script)

Language codes
- ISO 639-3: –
- Glottolog: None

Mid-Minch Gaelic (Scottish Gaelic: Gàidhlig meadhan na mara) is a currently developing pan-regional form of Scottish Gaelic, loosely based on the surviving dialects of Scottish Gaelic with considerable numbers of speakers. It has also been referred to by a number of other names, such as Standard Hebridean, BBC Gaelic, Standard Gaelic (Gàidhlig bhun-tomhasach) or Mixed Gaelic (Gàidhlig Mheasgaichte).

These are mostly concentrated around the North-West Highlands and Islands, including Wester Ross, the Outer Hebrides and Skye. As these cluster around The Minch, this variety has been dubbed Mid-Minch Gaelic; compare Mid-Atlantic English. The Gaelic term Gàidhlig meadhan na mara ("Mid-sea Gaelic") is somewhat wider and can be seen to incorporate varieties of Gaelic spoken further south, such as Tiree, Coll, Mull or Islay.

As is generally the case with dialect levelling, this process is fuelled both by the emergence of Gaelic mass-media such as Radio nan Gàidheal and BBC Alba, Gaelic medium education, the decline of the so-called peripheral dialects (e.g. East Sutherland or Perthshire) and greater migration and urbanisation, leading to dialect mixing.
