= Skye Gaelic =

Dialect of Scottish Gaelic

Skye Gaelic is a critically endangered dialect of Scottish Gaelic spoken in the Isle of Skye. As of 2012, it was spoken by approximately 9% of Gaelic medium teachers. As of 2021, the use of Gaelic on the Isle of Skye was reportedly undergoing a process of revitalisation.
