= List of television channels in Celtic languages =

Celtic-language television channels are available in any countries, worlds, places, etc. Many speakers of languages like any others to the television channels and languages such as Welsh and Breton have demanded television channels in their own languages for many years and have been successful, with Scottish Gaelic speakers joining them with the launch of BBC Alba in 2008, but languages like Manx and Cornish still don't have a full-time television channel.

== Irish language ==
=== Current channels ===
- TG4 (Irish: Teilifís na Gaeilge Ceathair, lit. 'Television in Irish Four'): channel based in the Republic of Ireland and broadcasting to the Republic of Ireland and Northern Ireland. TG4 has been successful in broadcasting Irish and increasing Irish speakers even though it has a limited budget. TG4 is aimed at young speakers of the language with youthful programmes. TG4 is funded by advertising and the Government of Ireland, with an annual budget of €60 million.
- Cúla 4: Irish-language children's channel that is part of the TG4 franchise and broadcasts from 6am until 8pm. It is also available via the Cula4 website and app.
- RTÉ One: is a channel based in the Republic of Ireland and part of the RTÉ (Irish: Raidió Teilifís Éireann, lit. 'Radio Television Ireland') franchise. It is primarily in English, but features several Irish language programmes such as:
  - Bog Amach (Move out), a property series.
  - Cloch le Carn (A Stone to the heap), a series remembering renowned personalities from across Irish society.
  - Nuacht RTÉ (RTÉ News), the news bulletin through Irish and Irish Sign Language.
  - Peataí (Pets), a series where pet-owners get answers from experts about their pet's problems.
  - Scannal (Scandal), an investigative series that analyses shocking and scandalous stories that shaped Irish society.
  - Seisiún (Session), a music series presented by singer and musician Muireann Nic Amhlaoibh.
- RTÉ News (formerly RTÉ News Now): is a free-to-air and commercial-free 24-hour live news service that is part of the RTÉ franchise. It offers a mix of Irish language, English language and Irish sign language TV news bulletins and political programmes. It is available on television via Saorview, Eir, Virgin Media, and Sky, and online through RTÉ Player and the dedicated app.
- Oireachtas TV (formerly Houses of the Oireachtas Channel): is a free-to-air digital television channel in the Republic of Ireland, with live broadcasts from both Irish houses of parliament, Dáil Éireann and Seanad Éireann, in Dublin. It covers parliamentary debates in both Irish and English. It is available on Saorview, Eir, Virgin Media, Sky and Vodafone. It is also available on the Oireachtas website.
- BBC Two Northern Ireland: has its own Irish-language department producing some well-known programmes such as:
  - Imeall Geal (Promise Edge), a music programme for young people.
  - Blas Ceoil (Music Taste), is a music programme.
  - Teenage Cics (Teenage Kicks), a youth drama set in 1980s, three Belfast spend their first summer away in the Donegal Gaeltacht.
  - Isteach Chun an Oileáin (Into The Island), a documentary about the natives of Inisbofin island in County Donegal.
  - Na Dódaí (The Dodais), a children's cartoon for learning Irish.
  - Gaisce Gnó (Be the Business), a children's game show. The show was intended as an Irish version of 'Beat the Boss'.
  - Féile an Phobail - Twenty Years On, a documentary series looking the highs and lows of Féile an Phobail (The Community's Festival) in West Belfast.

== Scottish Gaelic ==
=== Current channels ===
- BBC Alba ('BBC Scotland'): launched on 19 September 2008, the channel is available on Sky, Freesat, Freeview and Virgin Media also. BBC Alba broadcasts various genres of programmes serving the Gaelic community, including drama, sport and daily news in the form of An La.

=== Former channels ===
- TeleG: launched on 31 October 1999, it was the first Gaelic channel and was available on Freeview. The channel broadcast until 2011, when it was officially replaced by BBC Alba.

=== Channels previously with Gaelic programmes ===
- BBC One Scotland: the channel had a number of programmes in Gaelic through its Gaelic department (BBC Gàidhlig):
  - Dòtaman (Spinning top), a programme for pre-schoolers in Gaelic. Production ended in 2000.
- BBC Two Scotland: the channel had a number of programmes in Gaelic through its Gaelic department (BBC Gàidhlig):
  - Dè a-nis? (What now?), a children's programme.
  - Eòrpa (Europe), a current-affairs programme. Still available on BBC Alba.
- STV: a channel which broadcast a mixture of English and Gaelic programmes, such as:
  - Speaking our Language, a programme for beginners learning Gaelic. Production ended in 1996.
  - Machair, a soap opera programme in Gaelic based on the Isle of Lewis. Production ended in 1999.
  - Telefios, a news programme in Gaelic produced by both STV and Grampian that focused on the Western Isles and Gaelic-interest stories. Production ended in 2000.

== Welsh language ==
=== Current channels ===
- S4C (Welsh: Sianel Pedwar Cymru, lit. 'Channel Four Wales'): a channel broadcasting to Wales which has been successful in attracting new Welsh speakers. S4C is funded by the government of the United Kingdom and advertising.

=== Former channels ===
- S4C2: was a channel which broadcast from the National Assembly for Wales. S4C2 was closed in 2010.

== Breton language ==
- France 3 Ouest ('France 3 West'): regional service of the national France 3 channel, broadcasting mostly in French but with some local opt-outs in Breton:
  - An taol lagad, a daily lunchtime news bulletin in Breton.
  - Red an Amzer, a weekly current affairs programme.
  - Te ha Me (From You to Me), an Interview programme.
  - Mouchig-Dall, a Children's programme.
  - Son da zont (Song Coming Up), a music programme, showcasing music in Breton.
  - Istorioù Breizh (Stories of Brittany), a programme about the history of Brittany.

=== Channels previously with Breton programmes ===
- TV Breizh ('TV Brittany'): channel broadcasting in the Brittany region of France. Originally broadcasting in Breton and French, it stopped dubbing films in Breton in 2008 and sold its Breton language programs in 2009. Since 2010 it has ceased broadcasting in Breton.

== See also ==
- List of Celtic-language media
- List of Irish-language media
- Celtic Media Festival
