= Gaelic broadcasting in Scotland =

Gaelic broadcasting in Scotland is a developing area of the media in Scotland which deals with broadcasts given in Scottish Gaelic and has important links with the efforts of Gaelic revival in Scotland. As well as being informative, Gaelic broadcasting in Scotland has acquired some symbolic importance. Whilst opinion polls show that the vast majority of Gaels feel they have been ill-served by broadcasting media, Scotland now has Gaelic broadcasting all over Scotland both on television and radio.

== History ==
=== 1923–1945 ===
The first BBC radio broadcast in the Gaelic language was aired throughout Scotland on Sunday 2 December 1923; this was a 15-minute religious address by Rev. John Bain, recorded in the High United Free Church in Aberdeen. Two weeks later, a recital of Gaelic singing was broadcast, though it was introduced in English.

The first regular programme was singer Neil MacLean's Sgeulachdan agus Oran ('Stories and songs'), broadcast from the Aberdeen studio. The first Gaelic radio play, entitled Dunach, was aired in 1933. It is perhaps indicative of the status of Gaelic broadcasting at this time that the producer of Dunach knew no Gaelic.

A series of lessons for Gaelic learners was broadcast in 1935. In 1936, Scotland's first outside broadcast was a Gaelic service from Iona Abbey. In 1939 a weekly Gaelic news review was launched.

In 1935, Hugh MacPhee was appointed head of the BBC's first Gaelic department, which moved to Glasgow in 1938; this seems to have been the first attempt to put Gaelic broadcasting on a serious footing.

In 1940, An Comunn Gàidhealach requested an increase of output to two news programmes and a children's programme each week. This was refused, which resulted in questions being raised in the House of Commons.

=== The post-war years ===
After the Second World War, Finlay J. Macdonald (later co-founder of Gairm) joined Hugh MacPhee in the Glasgow studios; he was replaced in 1954 by Fred Macaulay. With two full-time producers, the regular programming was expanded to 90 minutes per week. There was a Friday evening news slot which George Orwell, writing at that time in Jura, criticised for its "amateurishness". A number of radio plays were produced, including An Tunnag Fhiadhaich, a translation by Lachlan MacKinnon of Henrik Ibsen's The Wild Duck (1951).

=== Television ===
Because few areas of the West Highlands and virtually none of the islands could receive television signals before the early 1960s, Gaelic TV was not an issue at first, though there had been coverage of the Mòd. As with radio, Gaelic TV broadcasting began with Gaelic songs introduced in English, such as Ceòl nan Gaidheal ('Music of the Gaels'), introduced by James Shaw Grant (1962). The first genuine Gaelic TV programme was in the light entertainment category: Se Ur Beatha ('You're welcome') in 1964. The first current affairs television series, Bonn Comhraidh, was launched in 1970. The first Gaelic educational programme Beagan Gaidhlig began in 1971. Gaelic schools programmes began in 1975. The first Gaelic children's TV programme, Cuir Car, was aired in 1977, followed by Bzzz in 1981, and the first programme for pre-school children, Mag is Mog, in 1982. The pre-school "classic" Dòtaman was broadcast from 1985. A 1978 White Paper on Broadcasting had identified broadcasting as having an important role to play in the preservation of Gaelic.

=== Radio Highland ===
In 1976, BBC Radio Highland began broadcasting from Inverness. In 1979, BBC Radio nan Eilean opened in Stornoway with Radio nan Gàidheal starting in October 1985.

=== 1980–2000 ===
The Thatcher government increased the funding for Gaelic broadcasting, largely because of Scottish Secretary George Younger's personal enthusiasm for the Gaelic community. With the funding the BBC were able to produce a small number of children's Gaelic programmes during term-time starting in October 1985, with Padraig Post, Dòtaman and Bzzz. BBC One Scotland broadcast the programmes in the morning usually before Children's BBC at 10:10 – 10:30 am, before moving to 9:45 am in October 1986 as part of new BBC Daytime line up. Since then, the timeslots have varied for children's Gaelic programmes during the daytime hours varying from around 9 am – 2 pm on BBC One Scotland between 1987 and 1995, From October 1995, The new timeslots were mostly in the mid-afternoon (3 pm – 3:30 pm from October 1995 - June 1998 and subsequently 2:55 pm – 3:25 pm from January 1999 - June 2002) with an occasional lunchtime slot at around 12 - 1 pm (12:05 pm – 12:30 pm from February 1996 - May 1996 and again in January - March 1997, 12:25 pm – 12:50 pm from October - December 1998 and 12:30 pm – 1 pm from February - June 1999 and briefly in November 2001). The BBC introduced a new two-hour Thursday evening Gaelic block on BBC Two Scotland in September 1993, including Dè a-nis?, Gaelic comedy, documentaries, music, and current affairs Eòrpa. The programming block has continued until April 2011, virtually all the programmes were moved to BBC ALBA following the completion of the digital switchover with the exception of Children's Gaelic programmes which continued to be broadcast on weekday mornings during CBeebies until March 2013 and the long-running current affairs programme Eòrpa until January 2019. Eòrpa is currently being repeated on BBC Parliament on Saturday nights.

The Broadcasting Act 1990 established a Gaelic Television Fund, administered by a Gaelic Television Committee (Comataidh Telebhisein Gàidhlig). The committee were given a £9 million budget, which was given independent producers, BBC, Grampian and STV. Grampian was required to broadcast in Gaelic for nearly an hour a day on average and STV for half an hour, which included a weekly 30mins slot in peak time. This was originally every weekday at 6:30 pm before programmes were spread out, to late night and weekends. Programmes included De Tha Seo? (Win, Lose or Draw), Machair, Haggis Agus, Air A Charraig and more others.

The Broadcasting Act 1996 resulted in improved funding, and also renamed the funding body 'Gaelic Broadcasting Committee' (Comataidh Craolaidh Gàidhlig, CCG). In 1999 TeleG, the first Gaelic language TV channel was launched, which broadcast daily for one hour (between 6 pm and 7 pm) on Digital Freeview. TeleG was established in October 1999 as the first dedicated Gaelic TV channel in Scotland and provided a limited Gaelic service on Freeview until May 2011. Broadcasts were limited to an hour slot between the hours of 6 pm and 7 pm. The channel stopped broadcasting in May 2011 and was displaced by BBC ALBA.

== 21st-century Gaelic broadcasting ==
=== Television ===
On 11 February 2002, CBeebies Alba was launched as the new programming slot for Children's Gaelic Programmes, initially broadcast on BBC One Scotland at 2:55 pm – 3:25 pm every weekday from the initial launch, BBC One Scotland stopped showing Children's Gaelic programmes (which for some reason had Channel 4's Natalie programme as part of the slot starting in 1993) in June 2002 (with the exception of the children's Mod repeat until October 2009) and they moved to BBC Two Scotland during CBeebies under the name CBeebies Alba, beginning in November 2002, Like BBC One Scotland, The timeslot varied in the earlier years. Initially it was broadcast from 9 am to 9:30 am from November 2002 to June 2003, later at 8:30 – 9 am from October to December 2003. For a while it was at 9:30 – 10 am from January - June 2004 but moved back to 8:30 – 9 am from October 2004 until December 2012 and from 7:50 – am - 8:20 am for a brief period in January - March 2013. In between it has come on at different times in the school holidays at 10:25 – 10:50 am in April 2003, 9:40 – 10:10 am in April 2004, and 7:30 – 8 am from July 2006 to September 2010.

Following the removal of children's shows from the mainstream channels BBC One and Two after the completion of the digital switchover, the programming slot was discontinued and all programmes moved to BBC Alba. Children's programmes along with other Gaelic programming can be seen every day on BBC Alba 5 – 7 pm. It broadcasts until midnight (sometimes 1 am due to sports coverage).

BBC Alba is a joint venture channel between the BBC and MG Alba. It is the first channel to be delivered under a BBC licence by a partnership. It broadcasts for up to seven hours a day in the evening. BBC Alba is broadcast on Freeview in Scotland as well as satellite and cable television providers and BBC iPlayer in the UK.

The popular Gaelic drama Bannan was first broadcast in 2014.

=== Radio ===
BBC Radio nan Gàidheal is the most widely broadcast Scottish Gaelic radio station and is available on FM frequencies throughout Scotland; webcast on the BBC website; and on cable and satellite channels in the United Kingdom. Gaelic language programmes are broadcast during the day from Monday to Saturday and the channel joins BBC Radio Scotland after closing transmission. Gaelic and bi-lingual programmes also feature on several north-west coast local radio stations, including Two Lochs Radio, Isles FM, An Radio and Cuillin FM. A bilingual Scottish Pop Chart show, produced to commission by MFR (Moray Firth Radio) in Inverness is also broadcast each week on several of these stations.

== Broadcasting for Gaelic learners ==
The broadcasting media have also carried Gaelic lessons for learners of the language. The first was a short radio series in 1934, six fortnightly Gaelic lessons in Gaelic by J. Nicolson. The weekly series Learning Gaelic by Edward Purcell with John M Bannerman and Archie Henry began in 1949.

Among the early BBC TV courses for beginners' Gaelic was Can Seo (1979). The current series for beginners is SpeakGaelic, introduced in 2021 by BBC Alba, in collaboration with Sabhal Mòr Ostaig and the Scottish Government and presented by Joy Dunlop. It replaced the previous, long-running series, Speaking our Language.

With the spread of Gaelic-medium units in primary schools, attended also by children from English-speaking households, there was a need for education series aimed at children in the early stages of immersion-phase language-learning: Baile Mhuilinn (TV) and Fiream Faram (Radio) both appeared in 1998.

== See also ==
- List of Celtic languages television channels
- Scottish Broadcasting Commission
- List of Irish-language media

== Sources ==
- Mike Cormack, 'Programming for Gaelic Digital Television: Problems and Possibilities', in Towards Our Goals in Broadcasting, the Press, the Performing Arts and the Economy: Minority Languages in Northern Ireland, the Republic of Ireland, and Scotland, ed. by John M. Kirk and Dónall P. Ó Baoill, 83–87. Belfast: Cló Ollscoil na Banríona, 2003.
- Mike Cormack (February 2004). "Gaelic in the Media". Scottish Affairs. 46 (1): 23–43. doi:10.3366/scot.2004.0004.
- Robert Dunbar, 'Gaelic-medium Broadcasting: Reflections on the Legal Framework from a Sociolinguistic Perspective', in Towards Our Goals in Broadcasting, the Press, the Performing Arts and the Economy: Minority Languages in Northern Ireland, the Republic of Ireland, and Scotland, ed. by John M. Kirk and Dónall P. Ó Baoill, 73–82. Belfast: Cló Ollscoil na Banríona, 2003.
- Roger Hutchinson, A Waxing Moon: The Modern Gaelic Revival, Mainstream Publishing, Edinburgh, 2005. ISBN 1-84018-794-8.
- William Lamb, 'A Diachronic Account of Gaelic News-speak: The Development and Expansion of a Register', Scottish Gaelic Studies, 19 (1999), 141–171.
