= List of Celtic-language media =

A map showing the six Celtic nations, from the north southward and corresponding languages: Scotland (Scottish Gaelic) Ireland (Irish) Mann (Manx) Wales (Welsh) Cornwall (Cornish) Brittany (Breton)

The list below contains information on the different types of media available in the Celtic languages.

== All languages ==
Only a handful of media contain all the Celtic languages. An example is Carn magazine, which has contained columns in all six languages since its 1970s inception.

The 2019 documentary series Tide was produced in Irish, Welsh and Scottish Gaelic editions.

== Scottish Gaelic ==
The following media are produced in the Scottish Gaelic language:

=== Television ===
==== Digital and satellite channels ====
- BBC Alba is a Gaelic-language television channel. The channel launched on 19 September 2008 and is now available in all Scottish homes after launching on Freeview on 8 June 2011. It is currently available across the UK on Sky channel 142, Freesat channel 109, Virgin Media channel 161 and online, with Freeview coverage available in Scotland only. The channel is funded by the Scottish Government, MG Alba and Bòrd na Gàidhlig. It costs £14 million a year to operate. The BBC Gàidhlig department is jointly responsible for the channel with MG Alba. Gaelic programming on BBC Two Scotland is to continue until the digital switchover is completed in 2012. It also has radio facilities, broadcasting BBC Radio nan Gàidheal, based in Stornoway.
- TeleG was a digital channel on Freeview only. It broadcast for only one hour a day before being replaced by BBC Alba.

==== Other ====
- BBC Gàidhlig is the Gaelic department of Scottish national broadcaster BBC Scotland. It offers some Gaelic programmes such as Eòrpa, Dè a-nis? and Air ais air an Ràn Dàn.
- STV is a major contributor to Gaelic programmes showing about four hours a week.

=== Radio ===
==== Radio stations broadcasting completely in Gaelic ====
- BBC Radio nan Gàidheal is a Gaelic-language radio station, founded in Stornoway and broadcast from 1985 to 89 under the name Radio Nan Eilean, when it joined with other BBC Scotland radio stations (mainly Inverness and BBC's HQ in Glasgow). It is available around Scotland on FM and internationally online with an annual budget of £4 million.

==== Radio stations with some Gaelic programmes ====
- Isles FM is a radio station based in the Outer Hebrides broadcasting programmes in English and Gaelic.
- Two Lochs Radio is a small radio station in the Scottish Highlands.
- Cuillin FM is Skye's main radio station and has several shows each week in Gaelic.
- Moray Firth Radio
- Reidio Guth nan Gàidheal a volunteer online radio station in English and Gaelic
- Scottish Radio South Australia a volunteer radio programme producing a monthly bilingual programme in Australia through 5EBI.

=== Print ===
- An Gàidheal Ùr was a Gaelic publication which ran for ten years until March 2009. It was available online or free in some local newspapers.
- Additionally, some Scottish newspapers, such as Scotland on Sunday, Press and Journal (Highland edition) and The Scotsman print columns in Gaelic.
- Local Stornoway paper Stornoway Gazette carries some Gaelic articles.
- West Highland Free Press includes Gaelic columns, Litir do Luchd Ionnsachaidh for learners, and also has part of its letterhead in Gaelic.
- Irish language magazine Nós, with a mainly young readership, has some articles in Scottish Gaelic.
- An Teachdaire Gaedhealach is published by Comunn Gàidhlig Astrailia (the Scottish Gaelic Association of Australia) with articles written side-by-side in Gaelic and English. It has been published on and off in Australia since 1982.

==== Publishers ====
Publishers which issue all, or some of their content in Gaelic include:

- Argyll
- Birlinn
- Gairm Publications
- Luath
- Ùr-sgeul
- Akerbeltz

=== Internet ===
- Naidheachdan BBC (in Scottish Gaelic) (BBC News)
- Clì Gàidhlig (in Scottish Gaelic and English) (The Voice of Gaelic Learners)
- Bòrd na Gàidhlig (in Scottish Gaelic and English)
- MG Alba (in Scottish Gaelic and English) (Gaelic Media Service)
- Fòram na Gàidhlig (in Scottish Gaelic) (Gaelic language forum)

== Manx ==
The following media are produced in the Manx language:

=== Radio programmes ===
- Traa dy Liooar ('Time Enough') is on Manx Radio every Monday from 5:05pm to 6.00pm. Traa dy Liooar is a magazine programme, and is hosted by Bob Carswell.
- Jamys Jeheiney ('Jamys on Friday') is on Manx Radio every Friday from 5:05pm to 6.00pm. Jamys Jeheiney is a Gaelic language world music programme alternately hosted by Jamys O'Meara and Jamys Kinree.
- Claare ny Gael ('Gaelic Programme') is on Manx Radio every Sunday from 8.00pm to 9.00pm.
- Shiaght Laa ('Seven Days') programme every Wednesday from 6.00pm to 6.30pm.

=== Print publications ===
- Manx language columns occasionally appear in the Isle of Man Examiner, including Brian Stowell's serialised novel, The Vampire Murders.
- The Family Manx magazine (a free publication) regularly carry Manx language articles, including a recipe in each edition.
- The Learn Manx website also publishes Gaelg Vio, a Manx language affairs publication, and also Bun as Bree, an online publication running from April 2011 until May–June 2012 aimed at intermediate-advanced learners discussing Manx grammar and style, written by Chris Lewin.

=== Visual presentations ===
- Adrian Cain has prepared a series of interviews and cartoons in Manx Gaelic which are available on YouTube.
- The short film Solace in Wicca, produced in 2012 by Culture Vannin, Isle of Man Film and CinemaNX.

== Breton ==
The following media are produced in the Breton language:

=== Television ===
- France 3, a few local opt-outs in Breton (ca. 60 hours every year) on the regional service France 3 Bretagne
- TVRennes35, television station broadcasting a number of programmes in Breton
- Tébéo

=== Radio stations ===
==== Broadcasting in Breton only ====
- Radio Kerne (in South Finistère)

==== Broadcasting in French and Breton ====
- Arvorig FM (in French and Breton) (in North Finistère)
- Radio Bro Gwened (in Morbihan)
- Radio Kreiz Breizh (in Western Côtes d'Armor)
- RCF Rivages (in Finistère)
- France Bleu Breizh Izel (from Quimper)

=== Print publications ===
- Bremañ, monthly magazine containing articles about various topics, including international events, politics, culture, economy, and society

=== Internet ===
- Agence Bretagne Presse: http://abp.bzh/
- Brezhoweb, web TV entirely in Breton language
- BreizhVOD, video on demand platform

== Cornish ==
The following media are produced in the Cornish language:

=== Radio ===
- An Nowodhow, a 5-minute news bulletin in Cornish is broadcast on BBC Radio Cornwall every Sunday at 5pm. Elizabeth Stewart took over presenting this programme from its long-standing presenter Rod Lyon in 2014.
- Radyo an Gernewegva, a weekly hour-long magazine programme originally just an online radio podcast is now also broadcast on several community radio stations in Cornwall. From 2014 Radio St Austell Bay is broadcasting it every Sunday at midday and Source fm (Falmouth and Penryn) broadcasts the same programme every Tuesday at 1pm.

=== Print publications ===
- An Gannas, monthly magazine containing news, fiction, learners' pages and special interest writing, available from Kowethas an Yeth Kernewek
- MyCornwall magazine has parts in Cornish and a Cornish learners' section.

=== Visual Media ===
- A variety of youtubers produce short videos on the Cornish language and in Cornish.

== Diaspora media ==
- Aisrigh nan Gaidheal, Scottish Gaelic radio programme on CKJM in Cheticamp, Nova Scotia, Canada
- Celtic Family Magazine, quarterly publication distributed in North America serving Celtic communities and their descendants
- Celtic Heritage Magazine, magazine in Nova Scotia, Canada

== See also ==
- List of television channels in Celtic languages
- Celtic Media Festival
