= BBC Gàidhlig =

Department of BBC Scotland

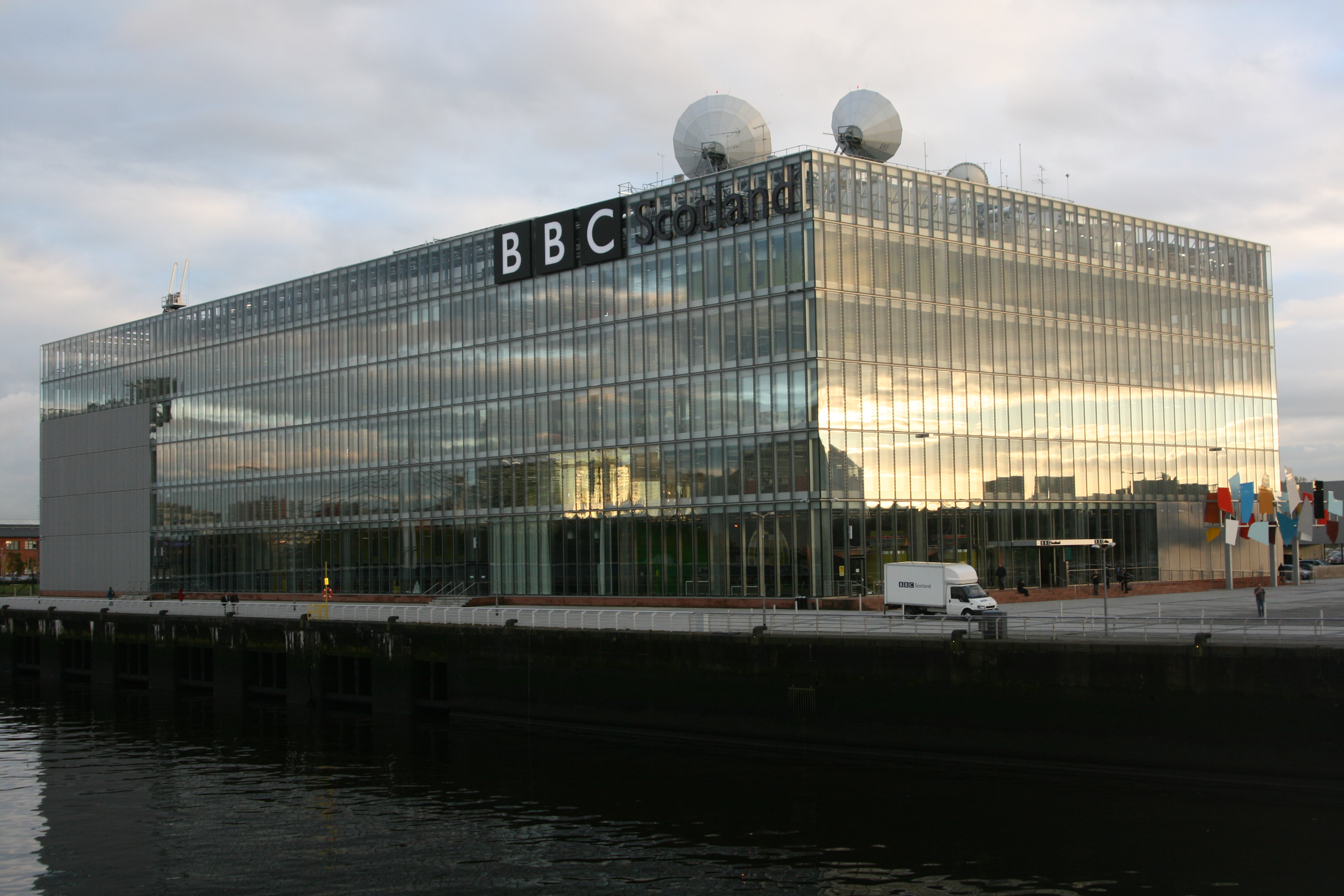
- BBC Alba HQ within the BBC Scotland (Pacific Quay building in Glasgow
- TV stations: BBC Alba
- Radio stations: BBC Radio Scotland; BBC Radio nan Gàidheal
- Headquarters: Pacific Quay, Glasgow (previously Queen Margaret Drive)
- Area: Scotland
- Owner: BBC
- Launch date: 1985
- Official website: www.bbc.co.uk/alba

BBC Gàidhlig is the department of BBC Scotland that produces Scottish Gaelic-language (Gàidhlig) programming. This includes TV programmes for BBC Alba, the BBC Radio nan Gàidheal radio station and the BBC Alba website. Its managing editor is Marion MacKinnon.

== Television ==
The department is responsible for Gaelic programming for television from the BBC. BBC Gàidhlig produces a number of programmes for the Gaelic-language television channel, BBC Alba, which is a joint venture between the BBC and MG Alba.

Some of BBC Gàidhlig's more notable programming includes the international issues magazine Eòrpa (Europe), children's programme Dè a-nis? (What Now?) and comedy sketch show Air ais air an Ràn Dàn (Back on the Ran Dan). Dè a-nis? won the department an award at the Celtic Media Festival in 2009.

BBC Gàidhlig also produces programming to cover the Royal National Mòd. For instance, during the National Mòd in Caithness in 2010, BBC Gàidhlig produced daily programmes to cover the event, which were aired and repeated on BBC Alba, as well as being repeated on BBC Two Scotland.

== Radio ==
BBC Gàidhlig is also responsible for the national Scottish Gaelic radio station BBC Radio nan Gàidheal. The station broadcasts across Scotland on FM, DAB digital radio, digital television and online. When it is not broadcasting Gaelic programming, it simulcasts BBC Radio Scotland.

== Online ==
In July 2008, the BBC Alba website launched an extended news service to tie in with the launch of the digital television channel. Programmes from BBC Alba and Radio nan Gàidheal are also available online on BBC iPlayer.

== See also ==
- Gaelic broadcasting in Scotland
- List of Celtic-language media
