= 1993 in Scottish television =

This is a list of events in Scottish television from 1993.

== Events ==
=== January ===
- 1 January – Scottish Television launches a new set of idents
- 4 January –
  - Following the launch of GMTV, news bulletins from Scotland are seen on ITV at breakfast for the first time.
  - Debut of Telefios, a Scottish Gaelic news programme produced by Grampian Television. It is broadcast on STV and Grampian daily with a lunchtime bulletin (1:10pm Grampian, 1:40pm Scottish), a teatime bulletin (6:25pm Grampian only) and a weekly review on Saturdays afternoons. Broadcast from the Aberdeen studios, they moved to Grampian's new Stornoway studios on 22 March.
- 5 January – Scottish produces a new series of Doctor Finlay, last aired by the BBC in 1971.
- January – Scottish Television launches a thirty-minute lunchtime edition of Scotland Today, presented by Angus Simpson and Kirsty Young – the first time that a regional television station in Britain has produced a full-length lunchtime news programme.
- 9 January – Speaking our Language launches on Scottish Television. The programme ran to 72 episodes and was designed to help people to learn Scottish Gaelic.

=== March ===
- 26 March – Prince Charles officially opens Grampian TV's £4 million studio complex at Stornoway.

=== May ===
- May – The final edition of Scotsport Results is broadcast by Scottish, bringing to an end Scottish's Saturday teatime results show, having broadcast the programme for the past 29 seasons.

=== June ===
- 2 June – Marcus Plantin, ITV's network director, announces the termination of Take the High Road from September 1993, as 'ITV's statisticians believed English audiences have had enough'. This results in public protest, as many believe that without ITV companies south of the border, the series has no chance. The issue is raised in the House of Commons under an early day motions, and the Daily Record newspaper holds a protest as well. By the end of June, Scottish Television decide to continue producing the series mainly for the Scottish market, but within a month, nearly all the ITV companies reinstate it after viewers complain about the show being dropped in the first place. At this point the series is shown on the ITV network on Wednesday and Thursday afternoons except for Scottish, Grampian and Border which show the series on peak time slots with episodes at least months ahead from the other regions.

=== September ===
- BBC Scotland launches a two-hour Thursday evening programming block in Gaelic on BBC Two Scotland. Content includes De a nis, Gaelic comedy, documentaries, music, and current affairs Eòrpa.
- 7 September – Carlton, Central, Tyne Tees Television and Yorkshire Television drop Take the Hight Road. All other ITV regions continue broadcast the soap, doing so after protests about the June decision to stop airing the soap outside of Scotland.

=== October ===
- 16 October – Carlton resumes broadcasting Take the High Road and Central did the same on 5 November 1993 after viewers complained about the show being dropped in the first place. However Tyne Tees Television and Yorkshire Television continue not to show the series, although they do reinstate it in 1996.

=== December ===
- 31 December – First edition of the annual Scottish football comedy sketch show Only an Excuse? which is aired each Hogmanay.

=== Undated ===
- After retaining its franchise unopposed on 16 October 1991, Scottish Television invests shares in various ITV companies and media firms, including a 25% stake in the newly launched breakfast strand GMTV.

== Debuts ==
=== BBC ===
- 30 September – Dè a-nis? (1993–present)
- 31 December – Only an Excuse? on BBC Scotland on 1 (1993–2020)

=== ITV ===
- 5 January – Doctor Finlay (1993–1996)
- 9 January – Speaking our Language on Scottish Television (1993–1996)
- 12 September – (United Kingdom) / (United States) / (Scotland) Hurricanes on Scottish Television (1993–1997)
- Unknown – Telefios on STV and Grampian (1993–2000)
- Unknown – Wolf It (1993–1996)

=== Scottish Television Enterprises ===
- Machair (1993–1999)

== Television series ==
- Scotsport (1957–2008)
- Reporting Scotland (1968–1983; 1984–present)
- Top Club (1971–1998)
- Scotland Today (1972–2009)
- Sportscene (1975–present)
- The Beechgrove Garden (1978–present)
- Grampian Today (1980–2009)
- Take the High Road (1980–2003)
- Taggart (1983–2010)
- Crossfire (1984–2004)
- Wheel of Fortune (1988–2001)
- Fun House (1989–1999)
- Win, Lose or Draw (1990–2004)
- What's Up Doc? (1992–1995)

== Deaths ==
- 3 August – James Donald, 76, actor
- 28 August – Agnes Lauchlan, 88, film and television actor

== See also ==
- 1993 in Scotland
