= Radyo an Gernewegva =

Cornish language radio broadcasting service

Radyo an Gernewegva (Cornish for 'radio of the Cornish-speaking area''; abbreviated as RanG) is a radio service broadcasting through the medium of the Cornish language both online, via podcast, and on several community radio stations in Cornwall, England, United Kingdom. It is a not-for-profit organisation, and receives some funding through the Cornish Language Partnership. It is produced by KernowPods.

== History ==
The service began in 2007 as 'Nowodhow an Seythun' (News of the Week). This was a short 4 minute podcast, distributed each week through a collection of Cornish cultural websites. This service was increased to half an hour each week in 2008, and adopted the new name "Radyo an Gernewegva". The format changed at this point to become a magazine programme, incorporating music, discussion and news. In 2010, Radyo an Gernewegva incorporated the original 'Nowodhow an Seythun' back into the service. In 2013 it was shortlisted for Radio Station of the Year at the Celtic Media Festival. In that same year a crowdfunding campaign was launched to raise funds for a new website. The campaign was successful, raising over £5,000. Listening to Radyo an Gernewegva is recommended as an aid to learning the Cornish language by the Say Something in Cornish course. It attracts more than 500 listeners every week.

In 2014 the service began to be broadcast by several community radio stations in Cornwall.

- Radio St Austell Bay broadcasts it every Sunday, at midday
- Source FM (Falmouth and Penryn) broadcasts the same programme every Tuesday at 1pm
- Coast FM Penwith, Cornwall plays the programme on Sunday mornings.
- Since 2020 the service is simulcast on Liskeard Radio, recently at the weekends.

== Presenters ==
Matthew Clarke is the main presenter and James Hawken, Tim Saunders and Nicholas Williams all provide regular content.

== See also ==
- List of Celtic-language media
