= Cathy MacDonald =

Scottish broadcaster

Cathy MacDonald (Gaelic: Catriona NicDhòmhnaill) is a Scottish broadcaster who is known for hosting many Scottish Gaelic-language television programmes such as Dotaman and has also presented BBC Scotland's Reporting Scotland news bulletins in the late 1980s, where she mostly presented the breakfast bulletins but occasionally presented the evening news throughout this period as well.

MacDonald made her TV debut as a vocalist competitor at the Royal National Mod at East Kilbride in October 1975 since then she went onto front subsequent Mod competitions as a presenter since 1987 - where she hosted with a variety of Gaelic personalities such as John Carmichael, Tony Kearney, John Urquhart, Mairi MacInnes, Patsi MacKenzie throughout her early years before presenting solo from the 1996 Mod onwards.

MacDonald previously hosted Siubhal gu Seachd every Monday – Thursday on BBC Radio nan Gaidheal. She currently presents Feasgar every Monday to Friday between 12:30 and 2 p.m. from the BBC studios in Edinburgh, though the programme is produced and aired from the Stornoway studios. MacDonald also regularly presents Sunday Morning With on BBC Radio Scotland.

She has also hosted a Gaelic cookery competition Cocaire nan Cocairean, which is aired on BBC Alba weekly.

She has hosted a series on BBC Alba, Cuide ri Cathy starting on Monday 22 September 2008, where she spends a day with some of Scotland's top celebrities including the First Minister Alex Salmond, TV presenter Aggie MacKenzie and Gail Porter, Pro Golfer Colin Montgomery, and writer Irvine Welsh.

MacDonald also presents regular installments of Sar Sgeoil on BBC Alba, looking at various well-known works of Scottish literature. Amongst the novels discussed are Sunset Song, by Lewis Grassic Gibbon; Kidnapped, by Robert Louis Stevenson; and The Lewis Trilogy (The Blackhouse, The Lewis Man and The Chessmen) by Peter May.
