= Charlez ar Gall =

French Breton broadcaster (1921–2010)

- Born: Charles Le Gall; 5 March 1921; Hôpital-Camfrout, Finistère, France
- Died: 3 November 2010 (aged 89); Brest, Finistère, France
- Occupations: Broadcaster; activist; writer
- Employer: ORTF
- Spouse: Chanig ar Gall (m. 1942)
- Children: 2

Charles Le Gall (5 March 1921 – 3 November 2010), known as Charlez ar Gall, was a Breton radio broadcaster, activist, and writer. After a career in radio, he worked as a broadcaster for the ORTF's Breton-language programming until his resignation in 1974, and along with his wife Chanig ar Gall, was a pioneer in Breton-language broadcasting.

== Biography ==
=== Early life ===
Charles Le Gall was born into an agricultural family on 5 March 1921 in Hôpital-Camfrout, a commune in the department of Finistère. He was raised in a Breton-language household and learned French while at school. In 1937, he became a student at the École Normale d'Instituteurs in Quimper, remaining there until he started teaching in 1940. After starting his teaching career in his native Hôpital-Camfrout, he later moved on to Brest and Argol. As a teacher, he refrained from penalizing students for speaking Breton and also ran Breton-language classes for adult students.

While teaching in Argol, he met Jeanne-Marie Guillamet, later Chanig ar Gall. The two married in 1942, and they later had two daughters. After the end of World War II, he moved to Brest with his wife and joined the Ar Falz Breton-language association. His last teaching post was at the Dupuy de Lôme school.

=== Broadcasting career ===
Charlez ar Gall began working in Breton-language radio in 1947. During the late 1950s, (Note: Sources differ over the exact year. Although the Centre de Recherche Bretonne et Celtique and The Independent say that this occurred in 1959, Ouest-France says 1958.) he became the host of Radio Quimerc'h's Breton-language programme, succeeding Pêr-Jakez Helias. Since the station had no studio, he broadcast from his own office, doing so at least 800 times for the next seventeen years. In 1962, a song that he aired, which was about the 1961 occupation of Morlaix, was deemed "seditious", causing him to receive a month-long suspension by order of the Minister of Information.

In 1964, Charlez ar Gall was hired by ORTF executive Louis Le Cunff for a ninety-second Breton-language daily news segment at the new ORTF Télé-Bretagne (now France 3 Bretagne), becoming the first to do so. Fañch Broudig described it as "the first fixation point for TV in Breton". In 1971, he and his wife became part of the first Breton magazine programme, Télé-Bretagne's Breiz o veva, with him as the host. His work for the news also led to a renewal of interest in the Breton tradition of fest noz. In 1974, he resigned from his job after his report on a committee concerning people jailed for suspected ties to the Breton Liberation Front was censored. He and his wife were later known as pioneers of Breton-language broadcasting.

=== Later life and death ===
Charlez ar Gall developed an interest in the history and culture of Brittany. He was a co-founder of the language activism organization Emgleo Breiz, contributed to the magazine Brud Nevez, and worked with Job Jaffré on a book about Breton culture, Breizh hor bro (1955). He was vice-president of the Société d'études de Brest et du Léon and a member of the Société archéologique du Finistère. He was also part of the Conseil supérieur de l'audiovisuel's Brittany committee.

Charlez ar Gall received awards and praise throughout his life. He and his wife were awarded with the Order of the Ermine in 1990. He was also made a Commandeur of the Ordre des Palmes Académiques. The Independent said that he was "one of those who strove to rekindle the flame of Breton patriotism in such difficult circumstances". Le Télégramme described him as a "great voice of radio and television in Breton".

Charlez ar Gall died on 3 November 2010 in Brest. His archives are held in the Bibliothèque Yves-Le-Gallo at the University of Western Brittany's Centre de Recherche Bretonne et Celtique.
