= Ken MacQuarrie =

British television executive

Ken MacQuarrie is the Director of BBC Nations and Regions and a member of the BBC Board, the executive board that governs the BBC.

== Life ==
Born on the Isle of Mull in the Inner Hebrides in Scotland, he attended school in Oban, followed by the University of Edinburgh and Moray House School of Education. He joined BBC Scotland as a researcher in 1975.

He became a radio producer for BBC Highland then transferred as a producer in Television in 1979. He was instrumental in introducing daily Gaelic children's programmes on BBC Scotland and developed the investigative current affairs programmes Prosbaig, Eòrpa and the children's programme Dè a-nis?.

In 1992 he became Head of Gaelic and Features and of Children's. By 2000 he had become Head of Programmes which gave him responsibility for production and commissioning of all BBC Scotland output. He was appointed Controller of BBC Scotland in April 2004.

As a senior member of the BBC Editorial Standards Committee, MacQuarrie has twice been asked to investigate high-profile incidents in the BBC. His 2012 report into Newsnight (following the programme wrongly accusing Lord McAlpine of abusing care-home boys) led to widespread changes in editorial policy. MacQuarrie was later commissioned by Director General Tony Hall to investigate Jeremy Clarkson's assault on his Top Gear producer.

He was appointed to run BBC Nations and Regions in September 2016, and sits on the two executive boards of the BBC; the BBC Board and the Executive Committee.
