= Chanig ar Gall =

French Breton broadcaster (1922–2012)

- Born: Jeanne-Marie Guillamet; 5 May 1922; Sizun, Finistère, France
- Died: 9 April 2012 (aged 89); Brest, Finistère, France
- Occupations: Broadcaster; entertainer; writer
- Employer: ORTF
- Spouse: Charlez ar Gall (m. 1942; died 2010)
- Children: 2

Chanig ar Gall (born Jeanne-Marie Guillamet; 5 May 1922 – 9 April 2012) was a French broadcaster, entertainer, and writer who specialised in Breton culture and, along with her husband Charlez ar Gall, was a pioneer in Breton-language broadcasting.

== Biography ==
Chanig ar Gall was born Jeanne-Marie Guillamet on 5 May 1922 in the Saint-Cadou area of Sizun, a commune in Finistère, to a family of farmers from the Crozon Peninsula. In 1942, she married Charlez ar Gall, who at the time worked as a schoolteacher in nearby Argol, and they had two children.

She joined her husband in Breton-language broadcasting after learning the language itself. In 1964, she became part of Radio Brest's Breton radio broadcasts, the first of their kind. In 1971, the two became part of the first Breton magazine programme, ORTF Télé-Bretagne (now France 3 Bretagne)'s Breiz o veva, with Chanig herself as the announcer. She and her husband would later be known as pioneers of Breton-language broadcasting.

She was also an actress in the Breton-language Teatr Penn ar Bed theatrical troupe, and she participated in poetry readings in both the Breton and French languages, performing alongside Yann-Fañch Kemener, Kristen Noguès, and Triskell. In 1992, she wrote an autobiographical book, L'Argolienne; Fañch Broudig later said that in doing so, she had "testified to a fine quality of writing". Other works include Lagad an Heol, l'oeil du feu (a bilingual collection of poetry by Pêr-Jakez Helias) and contributions to Brud Nevez, a Breton literary magazine. Le Telegramme described her as "one of the great performers of Breton culture over the past fifty years".

She and her husband were awarded with the Order of the Ermine in 1990. She was also awarded the Chevalier dans l'Ordre des Arts et des Lettres.

During her career, she was ill with cancer and made a recovery after having surgery for treatment in 1969. She later appeared at several Ligue nationale contre le cancer meetings to discuss breast cancer treatment.

Chanig ar Gall died on 9 April 2012 in Brest, France, more than a year after her husband's death. Fañch Broudig recalled that she "was a woman of heart, a woman of Brittany and of her time." Her funeral service was held in Brest on 13 April, with hundreds in attendance.
