= Anne Lorne Gillies =

Scottish singer, writer and activist

Dr Anne Lorne Gillies
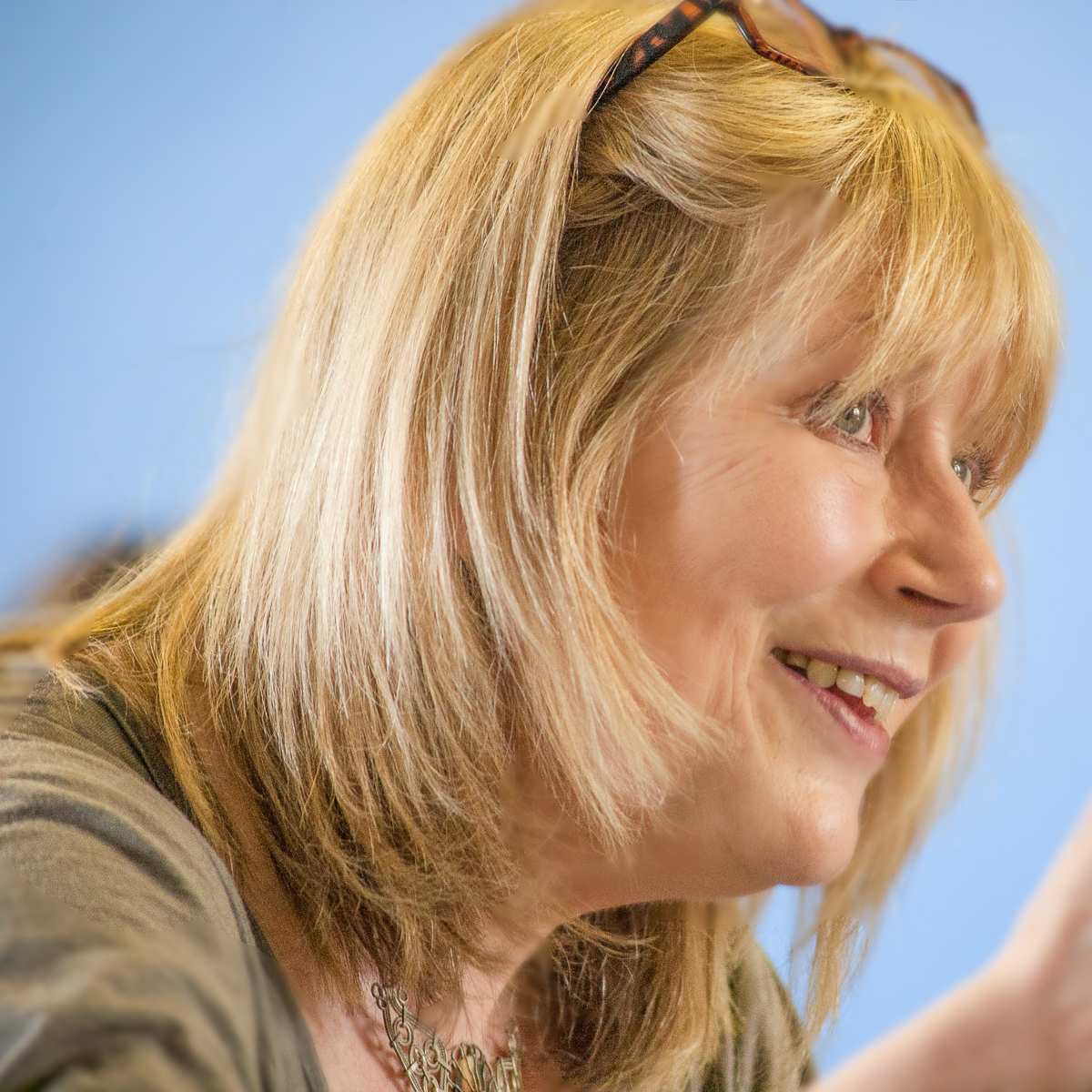
- Gillies in 2014

Background information
- Born: Anne Gillies; 21 October 1944 (age 81); Stirling, Scotland
- Origin: Oban, Argyll and Bute, Scotland
- Genres: Scottish folk music
- Occupations: Singer, writer, language activist

Anne Lorne Gillies MA, PhD, LRAM, PGCE, Dr h.c. (Scottish Gaelic: Anna Latharna NicGillìosa) is a Scottish singer, writer, and activist.

== Early life ==
Gillies was born in Stirling, Scotland in 1944 and moved to Oban at the age of 5. She attended Rockfield Primary School and Oban High School. She was Dux in Oban High School in 1962. She adopted the middle name Lorne when joining Equity Actors Union to indicate her connections with Oban. ( Lorne is a district in the Argyll and Bute council area and Oban is its capital.)

Gillies' musical upbringing spanned a wide range. Her maternal grandparents were professional classical violinists and Gillies learned to play the piano from an early age. While a pupil at Oban High School, she was inspired by many of her teachers, especially her English teacher, the poet Iain Crichton Smith, and John Maclean, the Rector (Headmaster) of the school, a native of the Island of Raasay, a classical scholar, and the brother of poet Sorley Maclean, from whom she learned a large number of Gaelic songs and to whom she dedicated her seminal book Songs of Gaelic Scotland (Birlinn, Edinburgh, 2005).

In her teens, Gillies sang, danced, and played at cèilidhs, concerts, and Mòds, and even introduced a touch of Gaelic culture to BBC Radio Scotland's Children's Hour. She also took advantage of the wide variety of amateur musical and theatrical productions that Oban offered, from school-based folk-group, baroque ensemble, debating society, and drama productions, to local bands, Gilbert and Sullivan productions, and public speaking.

In 1962, three months after leaving Oban High School, she won the coveted Women's Gold Medal for singing at the Royal National Mòd—an honour which brought with it a raft of opportunities to perform in concerts, tours, folk-clubs, and festivals on both sides of the Border.

During her early career, Gillies sang at large-scale Gaelic concerts on the official program of the Edinburgh International Festival (Usher Hall, Leith Town Hall) and appeared in the first of many live Hogmanay shows (1964) to an audience of over 20 million people. She took part in a televised folk concert in Glasgow's Kelvin Hall, organized by poet/folklorist Hamish Henderson, where she sang alongside Scots and Irish traditional performers such as Jeannie Robertson and The Chieftains. Following this appearance, Gillies started a musical partnership with Jimmy MacBeath, an itinerant worker and singer of Bothy Ballads from the north east of Scotland. During these early years, Gillies also gave regular radio recitals of a capella Gaelic song on BBC Scotland, and sang on the early BBC Gaelic black-and-white television series Songs all the Way.

In 1965, Gillies graduated MA (Celtic and English) from the University of Edinburgh, and went on to complete a post-graduate year as research student/transcriber in the School of Scottish Studies, at a time when the collection of Scotland's heritage of Gaelic song was at its peak. Then, in 1966, she left Scotland to pursue classical vocal training in Italy and London. She spent the next five years completing her apprenticeship both as a singer, under the tutelage of German Lieder experts Helene Isepp, Ilse Wolf and Paul Hamburger, and also (to "have something to fall back on", as her grandmother always said) as a secondary school teacher of English, History and Music. Having acquired a Postgraduate Certificate in Education from the University of London (PGCE), she went on to teach in a huge, progressive, arts-oriented comprehensive school in Bicester, Oxfordshire, famed for the size and quality of its Music Department: its impressive end-of-term productions involved the whole community and included Wagner's Die Meistersinger and Verdi's Nabucco (with Gillies in the rôle of Abigail).

== Television performer ==
Gillies returned to Scotland in 1971, and has been based here ever since, singing in concerts, theatre, studio recordings, and radio and television programmes.

Her media “break” came as resident singer on Mainly Magnus (1971–72) – a 26-week live Saturday night TV chat-show (BBC Scotland) hosted by Magnus Magnusson. Other BBC Scotland TV programmes followed, including the much-loved Gaelic musical series 'S e ur beatha BBC Scotland, on which Gillies sang and introduced traditional performers including Aly Bain, Tom Anderson and Na h-Òganaich.

In 1973, shortly after the birth of her first child, she starred in a one-off eponymous 50-minute "special" programme (BBC2 UK network) with guest star Stéphane Grappelli. Showcasing Gillies' wide musical repertoire and also featuring her talent as a storyteller and illustrator, this show gained her the rather ironic title of "Best TV Newcomer of the Year", as voted for by readers of the Daily Record for TRICS, the Television and Radio Industries Club of Scotland. (Even more ironically she was invited back the following year to present the same award to Billy Connolly.)

Other highlights during this time include:

• Anne Lorne Gillies: another 50-minute “one-off music special” (network/UK: BBC2, for legendary producer Yvonne Littlewood) was followed by a series of six programmes with the same format in which Gillies presented and sang with an array of international guests including the Swingle Singers, The Kings Singers, the Chieftains, Fairport Convention, Scottish Ballet, Juan Martine, Niels-Henning Ørsted Pedersen.

• There was a Girl: a series created for BBC Scotland by the Laurence Olivier Award-winning English dancer Gillian Lynne (choreographer of Cats, Phantom of the Opera, etc. who was created a Dame in 2014). In each programme Anne told a separate love story through music and dance with the help of a troupe of male Broadway dancers, and each featured a male star of film and stage: George Chakiris (American Academy Award-winning actor/dancer, best known for creating the rôle of Bernardo Nuñez, leader of the Sharks, in the Hollywood smash-hit musical West Side Story), David Hemmings (star of Michaelangelo's Antonioni's English film Blow-up), French actor / dancer Jean-Pierre Cassel (Murder on the Orient Express, Oh! What a Lovely War, Prêt-à-Porter) and Barry Ingham, star of the Royal Shakespeare Company and musicals on Broadway and London's West End (Gypsy, Camelot, Aspects of Love)

• Something to Sing About (BBC2 UK/network) six 50-minute Light Entertainment programmes co-starring legendary Scottish comedian Chic Murray, actors Patrick Malahide and Jan Wilson and Scots baritone Peter Morrison.

• The Castles of Mar (BBC Scotland) location OB series filmed in Royal Deeside from some of the National Trust for Scotland's most iconic castles. Anne sang Scots songs, mainly from the North-East tradition, and introduced some of Scotland's most enduring entertainers, including Andy Stewart, Isla St Clair, Fulton MacKay, Russell Hunter and Iain Cuthbertson

• Many one-off TV shows, including Rhythm on Two (contrasting the styles of Gillies and Barbara Dickson, BBC2 UK); Anna agus Clannad (BBC Scotland) – highlighting stylistic similarities and distinctions between the Scots and Irish Gaelic traditions; The Puffer’s Progress: an hour-long film (BBC1 network/UK) shot on location on board a Clyde ‘puffer’ as she steamed slowly along the Crinan Canal, and showcasing Gillies' own original songs – including her “signature song” “The Hills of Lorne”; My kind of music (BBC1 network/UK) also showcasing Gillies' own songs, including “After the Pantomime”: with special guest star, Alan Price.

• Numerous guest appearances on popular BBC TV series such as Castles in the Air, Songs of Scotland, The Max Boyce Show and Talla a’ Bhaile; on, Independent channels, Thingummyjig, Sir Harry Secombe’s Highway; and of course the live Hogmanay shows (BBC and ITV network/UK) in which Gillies starred regularly, over the years, alongside Scottish stars such as Kenneth MacKellar, Iain Cuthbertson, Alastair MacDonald, Peter Morrison and Annie Ross.

• Children's programmes: Gillies' brief stint as Scottish anchor-person on the Multi-coloured Swap Shop (presented by Noel Edmonds and Keith Chegwyn) was interrupted by the birth of her third child. Thereafter, she was involved in several Gaelic children's series, including Bzzz which featured twelve original Gaelic pop-songs co-written by Anne and pianist David Pringle.

From the late 1980s onwards, Gillies increasingly worked as presenter / interviewer of adult programmes, especially those in, or relating to, the Gaelic language: she fronted three series of About Gaelic (Scottish Television's popular and informative chat-show – an "introduction to Gaelic culture for non-Gaelic speakers") and Barail nam Boireannach – two challenging hour-long Gaelic language versions of Scottish Television's current affairs series 100 Scottish Women. She was also a guest presenter on BBC's Saturday Night at the Mill (where she interviewed, among others, Tippi Hedren, star of Alfred Hitchcock's film The Birds) and, in the 1990s, completed a 5-day stint chairing Channel Four's live daytime current affairs programme Powerhouse.

More recently, with the growth of Gaelic-medium television programming, her appearances have included

- interviewee in chat-shows such as Còmhradh ri Fionnlagh, and Dòmhnall MacLeòid agus Dòmhnall MacLeòid (STV / Grampian)
- Thuige seo and Fonn mo bheatha with Cathy Anne MacPhee (BBC Alba)
- presenter of religious series: Laoidhean agus Sailm and Spiorad Dhè (STV / Grampian)
- co-presenter, singer/songwriter, in the 1980s children's series 'Bzzzz', co-written by Finlay J MacDonald with Donnie 'Large' MacDonald and cartoonist Ewan Bain (BBC Scotland)
- Reòiteag air Rothan / The Ice-cream Factory for Channel 5.
- actor in Leabhar an Àigh – dramatised documentary by Dr Finlay MacLeod, about Edward Dwelly, the man who wrote the definitive Gaelic dictionary (BBC Alba)
- writer / presenter of Dà chànan aon chridhe / Twa heids ane hert 45-minute TV musical documentary about Robert Burns (MNE for BBC2) with guest musicians including Sheena Wellington, Jim Malcolm, Karen Matheson, Donald Shaw, James Graham, Maggie MacInnes

== Champion of Gaelic ==
Throughout her career, Gillies has espoused many causes, charitable, cultural and political: she has raised funds and public awareness for many organisations – medical, social, artistic, political – especially those connected to children and Scottish Gaelic culture. In 1983 she was invited to take on the role of Patron of Comhairle nan Sgoiltean Àraich (the Gaelic Voluntary Playgroup Association) and then became a key player in a no-holds barred nationwide campaign to persuade the authorities to recognise the importance of the Gaelic language both within Scotland and at international level: the urgent need to reverse the decline of Gaelic as a spoken language and to protect and develop its heritage through its development as a medium of communication on radio and television and in mainstream education.

She was the Patron of the Gaelic Playgroup Association from its inception in the early 80s, and established Padraig am Bus Trang, a double-decker Gaelic Playbus Project which brought the advantages of language and play to the most deprived inner-city areas in Glasgow. She became one of the Directors of the Glasgow Highland Association which gives grants to university students of Highland parentage or ancestry, and a Director of Comhairle nan Leabhraichean (The Gaelic Books Trust).

In between raising her own three children, she has worked in support of Gaelic voluntary organisations, raising funds and public awareness, organising events, committees and parental groups, and using her contacts and expertise to persuade all political parties, as well as the educational establishment, to acknowledge the viability and value of Gaelic in the modern world – specifically as a medium of education at every level of education, both formal and in the community. In 1983 she was commissioned by Sabhal Mòr Ostaig (the Gaelic College in Skye) to conduct a study into “Popular Attitudes towards recent Gaelic developments and their relevance to 20th century Scotland”. The resultant report led directly to her return to University: first as a full-time post-graduate student in the University of Strathclyde, where she gained an Additional Qualification (ATQ) as a primary teacher, and thereafter to undertake a Masters’ course in Multicultural Education, which was then converted to a doctoral thesis:

Fraser, Anne (1989) “Gaelic in primary education: a study of the development of Gaelic bilingual education in urban contexts”, PhD thesis, University of Glasgow.

From 1986 to 1991, she worked as National Education Development Officer for Comann na Gàidhlig (CnaG), the principal Government-funded language development agency at the time, helping to promote Gaelic as a medium of education at all levels, from preschool to tertiary. The work of Anne and her many colleagues throughout the Gaelic-speaking community led to a sea-change in the fortunes of the language, with unprecedented levels of official support, its burgeoning usage within the Scottish education system and media, and – vitally – its endorsement and encouragement among native Gaelic-speakers and learners at grassroots level. Massively heartening developments which could not have been predicted when Gillies' own children were growing up.

In 1991, for family reasons, Gillies took a job as Arts Development Officer with Govan Initiative Ltd, to develop an arts strategy for the enrichment of a disparate and often dispirited area that had suffered from acute social and economic problems since the decline of the shipbuilding industry. Working closely with the Talbot Association, Communities United, Govan Action on Disability and Govan Action for Pensioners, the Unemployed Workers’ Centre, and many more groups and organisations she established a wide array of arts activities designed to address problems of unemployment, homelessness, addiction, disability, and fear of crime. Principal among these was the Greater Govan Youth Theatre, a network of groups designed to develop skills and overcome social, sectarian and territorial dichotomies among young people.

After leaving Govan, but still acutely aware of the historical presence of a substantial Gaelic-speaking population in G51, Gillies produced Tuathcheòl – a televised Gaelic country music series from Glasgow's Grand Ole Opry on Govan Road. Working alongside Iain Mac 'Ille Mhicheil (John O. Carmichael), the show was made by MNE for Scottish Television, and became hugely popular with Gaelic and non-Gaelic audiences alike throughout Scotland and Ireland.

In 1996, she was appointed Gaelic Lecturer in the Faculty of Education of the University of Strathclyde, where among other things she was remitted to provide training to Gaelic speaking students in techniques of 2nd language immersion and their application to the Scottish Gaelic-medium primary school context.

== Political activism ==
In the 1990s, she had become publicly and actively involved in the Scottish National Party (SNP), an organisation with which her family had had ties, both direct and indirect, for many decades (see William Gillies). In 1996 she was elected to the SNP's National Council and National Executive Committee, appointed Cabinet Spokesperson on the Arts, Culture and Gaelic, and then stood as SNP candidate for the Western Isles constituency at the 1997 General Election and throughout the following year she put her public profile to use throughout Scotland in promoting Devolution. In September 1998 she was selected by delegates at the SNP's conference as a candidate for the 1999 European Parliament elections.

== Honours and awards, voluntary and freelance work ==
Gillies was elected by the membership of the Association of Speakers’ Clubs of Great Britain as their Speaker of the Year, 2005.

Other awards and honours have included an Honorary Doctorate from the University of Edinburgh; Fellowships from the University of the Highlands and Islands, the Royal Incorporation of Architects in Scotland, the Association for Scottish Literary Studies, and the Burns Association of Irvine; and in 2009 her appointment by the Scottish Government as Tosgair na Gàidhlig (Gaelic Ambassador).

Over the years Gillies has served voluntarily on numerous committees and working-parties, notably the Scottish Arts Council Music Committee, Comhairle nan Leabhraichean (The Gaelic Books Council) and the Curriculum for Excellence Consultative Group on Gaelic; she was Honorary Vice President of Visual Arts Scotland, opening their major exhibition in the RSA in Edinburgh in November 2000, and became heavily involved with the Royal Incorporation of Architects of Scotland, including travelling throughout Scotland as an adjudicator for their award scheme “Regeneration Scotland” and giving a keynote speech at one of their Annual conferences.

Her extensive charity singing appearances were recognised by the award of Rotary International's Paul Harris Fellowship, not only her performances for Rotary itself (after-dinner speeches and cabaret performance, Burns' Suppers etc, at local and international levels) but also for her support of other organisations (Childline, Action Research, the Duke of Edinburgh Award Scheme, the Ayrshire Hospice, British Heart Foundation, the Highland Fund, the Iona Community, the Malcolm Sargent Trust, Cancer Research, Age Concern, Sight in Grampian, the Epilepsy Association of Scotland, Equity Benevolent Fund, the Red Cross, the Police Federation, etc. etc.) She was closely associated with the Aberlour Children’s Trust especially during their 125th anniversary and became a Patron of SABIC – the organisation which offered week-by-week support to parents of children with brain injury.

She left her post at Strathclyde University in 2000 to work freelance again, specifically to address the urgent need for resources (print, electronic etc.) in the newly-establishedGaelic-medium primary school classrooms. From 2000 to 2017, she lived in Ayrshire where, along with her husband, Kevin Bree, recently retired from Scottish Television where he was Outside Broadcasts Manager, she ran an independent Gaelic multimedia partnership (Brìgh Productions) writing, producing and publishing Gaelic books and recording talking books, television and radio programmes, music CDs, CD-ROMs (educational games and teachers’ packs etc.) Notable among the latter were:

=== Coille an Fhàsaich ===
- the Gaelic Songs and Poems of Donald Mackillop, Published by Brigh Productions in 2008. Edited and translated from Gaelic by Anne.

Scotsman Review 13 December 2008 (Translated from Gaelic)

There are big books about islands and little books of poetry. In Coille an Fhàsaich the publishers have put both these things together. MacKillop’s poetry is now at the heart of a book about the island of his birth and upbringing, Berneray Harris. The book is also enriched by the fact that it represent the skills of three individuals: the poet himself, born in 1926; Anne Lorne Gillies, who is a singer and Gaelic scholar; and Kevin Bree, her husband, who took some of the photographs and designed the book. - Ronald Black

==== Ardsgoil ====
a series of short novels aimed at reluctant teenage readers;

==== Leabhar Mor na Gaidhlig ====
the comprehensive Teachers' notes that accompanied the Scottish / Irish book / exhibition Leabhar Mor na Gaidhlig, reviewed in the cover-notes by Professor Duncan MacMillan of Edinburgh University as "This is not so much an education pack as an education. What Dr Anne Lorne Gillies has produced is a Gaelic history of the world.”

and, in complete contrast, the Gaelic drama-documentary

==== Para Shandaidh, Sàr Mharaiche / Para Handy, Master Mariner ====
(Brìgh for BBC2) which she co-wrote with the late, celebrated comedian Norman MacLean, and which earned Gillies' favourite of all her many reviews over the years: "There is a clear temptation to say that Para Handy, Master Mariner was ‘chust sublime’, but since it contained only a passing reference to the incident involving a flying tortoise in Glasgow's Carrick Street, the accolade is withheld... An affectionate, thoroughly enjoyable film." (Ian Bell, Scotsman)

== Songs of Gaelic Scotland ==
In 2005 Birlinn Ltd (Edinburgh) published Gillies’ book Songs of Gaelic Scotland, which is now in its 4th edition. It is an anthology of 251 songs chosen from both Gillies' work and that of other traditional Gaelic activists in recent history such as Flora MacNeil, William Matheson, and John Maclean. The book represents over four centuries of Gaelic life in the Scottish Gàidhealtachd and beyond. Using simple musical transcriptions, English translations of all lyrics, and wide-ranging commentaries, it portrays the emotive histories of the Gaelic-speaking people in their own words, encompassing love, loss, war, exile and humour.

- In 2006 it won the prestigious Ruth Michaelis-Jena Ratcliff Prize for a publication on Scots and Irish Folklore and Folklife.

Reviews have included

- “a panoramic view of the world of Gaelic song ... a superb achievement” – John MacInnes.
- “This book is unique in that it crosses the boundaries between music and literature. Nothing quite like it has ever been done for Gaelic. It is a truly wonderful achievement.” – Scots Magazine
- “…beautiful and full of substance ... I believe that this book will be like a beacon that will last forever and be of untold value to generations still to come” – Aonghas Phàdraig Caimbeul, West Highland Free Press.
- What a complete gem! A fascinating collection of 151 songs sensibly arranged in 5 thematic categories. Each entry includes an English translation alongside the Gaelic lyrics, and a melody score. Each song is accompanied by a fascinating commentary on its origins and subject, often discussing alternative versions and stating who has recorded them on what albums, so they can easily be listened to. The book is printed and bound to a high standard. - Wings Rock n Flick Roll
- "This book is a joy, beautiful to look at and full of interest and scholarly input. The words of a great number of Gaelic songs are included alongside the English translation and the melody lines are there too so the whole song is instantly available. The book explores in depth the rich treasure house of Gaelic song. Explanations and fascinating information are in English, a bonus for many like myself, whose love of the Gaelic does not extend to being able to read it! I have bought this book as a present for a young musician who is a wonderful exponent herself of the Gaelic music tradition but I am so enchanted with it I shall now have to buy myself a copy.” - Meg Merrilees
- “This is a fantastic collection of Gaelic songs that provides an insight to the background of each song and guidance on where to hear various versions of the songs. It captures everything that shaped a great people who suffered oppression, genocide and persecution by others in their own country who feared them because they didn't understand their language and their customs. There is now an unstoppable revival of Gaelic culture and the Gaelic language - the oldest written language north of the Alps. Whether you speak Gaelic or not, this is a fascinating book.” - K. Macintyre

== Scottish Traditional Hall of Fame ==
- In 2012, Anne was inducted into the Scottish Traditional Music Hall of Fame and
- in 2022, the 60th anniversary of her winning the Royal National Mod Ladies' Gold Medal, she was presented with the prestigious Services to Gaelic Award by the Scottish Traditional Music Hall of Fame at a memorable event in Dundee's Caird Hall, a venue where she had sung in Scots and Gaelic at so many cultural and charitable events.
- Until recently, she has continued to sing, teach and lead master-classes and workshops on Gaelic music on both sides of the Atlantic, and has appeared fairly frequently as a singer / interviewee on BBC Alba and BBC Radio nan Gàidheal.
- In 2023, Anne was featured in popular children's writer Louise Baillie's book "Spectacular Scottish Women" - a celebration of "iconic women" from Scotland's past and present: an inspiring and colourfully illustrated collection of biographies – from Mary Queen of Scots to Annie Lennox – written specially for young people.
- Anne's long-awaited historical novel, set in 17th century Scotland, Ireland and France, has survived the interruptions of COVID, baby-sitting, and the joys of "time's winged chariot" and she is determined to finish it "before too much longer".

== Family ==
Anne Lorne Gillies is married to Kevin Bree. She has three children by her previous marriage to Neil Fraser. Anne's brother is Prof. William Gillies.
