= Tormod MacGill-Eain =

- Born: Norman Hector Mackinnon Maclean; 26 December 1936; Glasgow, Scotland
- Died: 31 August 2017 (aged 80); Uist, Scotland
- Education: Glasgow University
- Occupations: Comedian, novelist, poet, musician, broadcaster

Norman Hector Mackinnon Maclean (Scottish Gaelic: Tormod MacGill-Eain; 26 December 1936 – 31 August 2017) was a Scottish Gaelic comedian, novelist, poet, musician and broadcaster. He is the only person to have won both Bardic Crown and gold medal at the same Royal National Mòd. His struggles with alcoholism are documented in his autobiography, The Leper's Bell: Autobiography of a Changeling.

== Early life ==
Maclean was born in Glasgow on 26 December 1936 to Niall and Peigi MacLean. but was evacuated to Lochaber in 1940 where he was brought up by Gaelic-speaking relatives. He spent a part of his childhood in South Uist and Benbecula. He then went to Glasgow where he attended Bellahouston Academy. His father died suddenly when Maclean was 15.

== Career ==
Maclean (MacGill-Eain) attended Glasgow University. He trained to become a teacher but also started to perform songs and piping. In the early 1970s he expanded his repertoire by spending more time on jokes between songs and became a stand-up comedian.

He wrote and starred in his own TV show "Tormod Air Telly". Maclean provided the vocal talents for several re-dubbings of children's programmes into Gaelic - most notably "Donnie Murdo", the Gaelic version of Danger Mouse. He played the lead role of the Miller in the 1998 BBC Alba children's programme Baile Mhuilinn.

Throughout his life, Maclean had a destructive relationship with alcohol which stopped him taking many opportunities. He was due to appear in Comfort & Joy as well as failing to appear for bookings or failing to achieve his potential as well as having a large effect on his personal life and health.

Maclean, the subject of an award-winning documentary, 'Tormod', produced by BBC Alba, moved to Uist in 2009. He wrote a monthly column for the community newspaper, Am Pàipear, and has a starring role, as an old bard, in the full-length feature film, Blackbird (originally known as Ruadhan the Bard), which opened at the Edinburgh International Film Festival in 2013.

== Corpus ==
Maclean composed the pipe tune "Scarce O' Tatties", he has composed long and short poems, including "Maol Donn", also known as MacCrimmon's Sweetheart, which won him the Bardic Crown in 1967, and has produced novels in Gaelic, "Cumhnantan" (1997), "Keino" (1999), "Dacha Mo Ghaoil" (2005), and "Slaightearan" (2007), as well as his autobiography, "The Leper's Bell" (2009), in English.

== Death ==
Maclean died on 31 August 2017 in Uist, aged 80.

== External references ==
- HeraldScotland, 13 January 2007
- Scotland on Sunday interview, 20 September 2009
