= Christopher Young (producer) =

Scottish television producer, born 1959

Roger Christopher Young, known as Chris Young, is a Scottish TV and film producer, and founder of Young Films. His credits include The Inbetweeners and Bannan.

Young was born in Edinburgh in 1959. His London-based company specialized in high-quality niche films, such as the highly-acclaimed Gaelic-language film Seachd: The Inaccessible Pinnacle. He achieved wider popularity with the TV series and film The Inbetweeners.

Young moved with his family to Skye in the 1990s. Young Films was relocated there in 2014. Young is a Gaelic-language activist, and his children attend Gaelic medium education.

In 2014, Young endorsed Scottish independence, arguing that it would provide opportunities for Scottish film and television.
