= Coast FM (West Cornwall) =

Radio station in England

- West Cornwall; England
- Frequencies: 96.5, 97.2 and 106.4 MHz
- RDS: COAST FM

Programming
- Language: English
- Format: Daytime/mornings: Hot AC/Adult Hits; Evenings/weekends: Freeform

History
- First air date: 30 August 2014
- Former names: Penwith Radio (2014–2016)

Technical information
- Transmitter coordinates: 50°7′2.9964″N 5°32′16.4616″W

Links
- Webcast: Live Stream
- Website: www.coastfm.co.uk

West Cornwall's Coast FM is a local radio station for West Cornwall. It contains a combination of local news, weather, music and talk. The station launched from its studios in Penzance on 5 November 2016 as a re-brand of Penwith Radio.

Under the 'Character of service' section of the station's key commitments, it states that the station "offers a local voice, broadcasting a service which acts as a barometer of local opinion, and provides companionship for people, enabling them to feel more connected and less isolated."

Monetary backing is provided by advertisements and sponsorship from local businesses and organisations, as well as national grant funding. The station is a community interest company.

== Programming ==
Coast FM's programming format involves two main categories:

Mainstream programming: During daytime on weekdays and weekend mornings, which consists of charted and popular music from 50s-today, and formatted local information such as the "What's On Diary", "Surf Report" and "Time Saver Travel".

Specialist programming: From 6pm on weekdays and from 12 midday on weekends. This largely is freeform and caters to those with more specific interests or musical tastes.

The programming section of the station's key commitments states "[the station] broadcasts a range of programmes specific to its West Cornwall audience. These programmes reflect local interests with discussion, interviews, music and invite interaction from listeners throughout"

Weekday daytime programmes include: 'Coast FM Breakfast' at 7am, 'Coast FM's Decade of the Day' at 9am, 'Coast to Coast' at 10am, 'Coast Lunch' at 12 midday, 'Coast Afternoon' at 2pm and 'Coasting Home' at 5pm.

== Studios ==
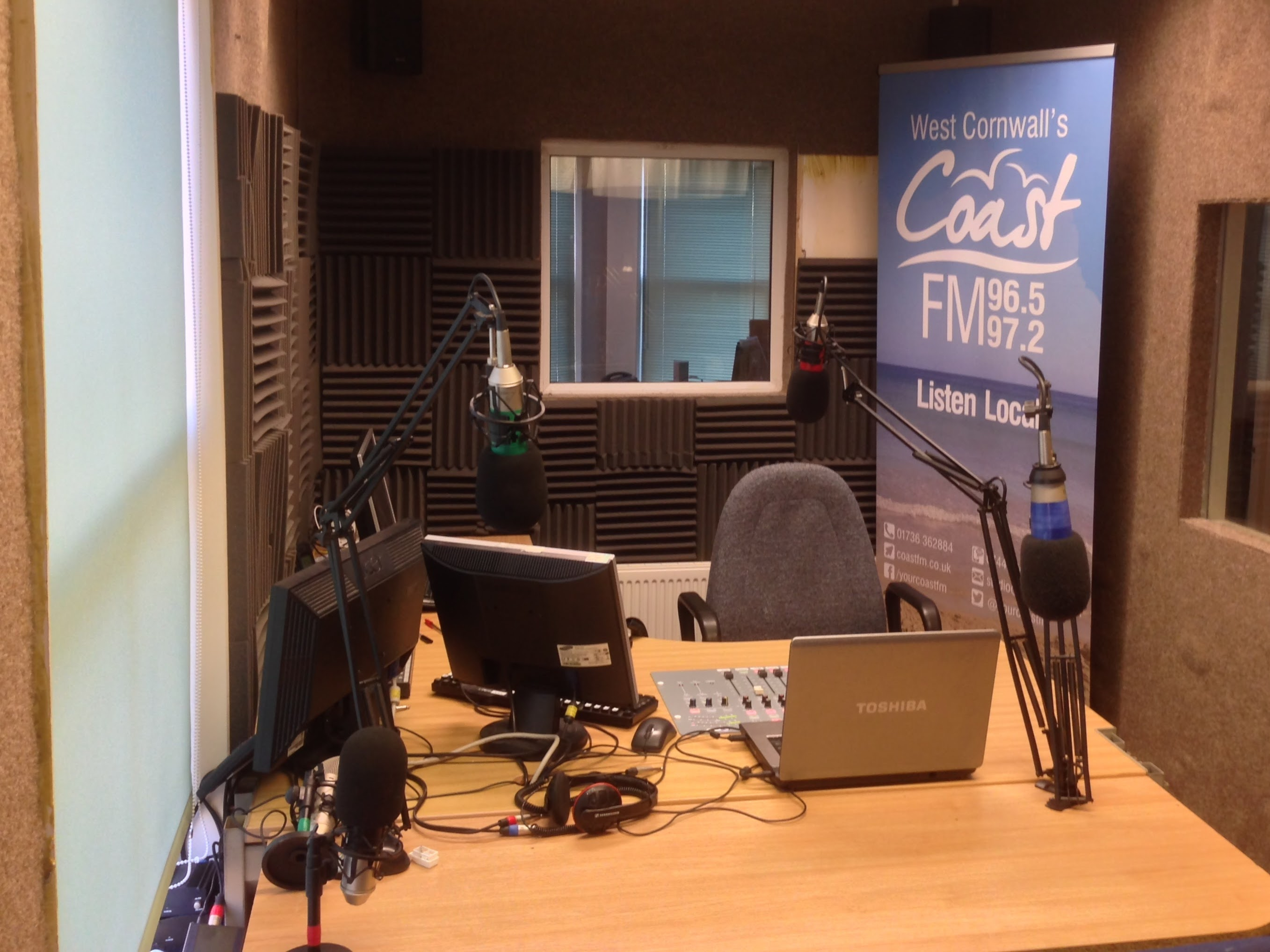
Studio A, Coast FM.

The station currently broadcasts from its studio at the Lafrowda Centre in St.Just. As Penwith Radio, the station was based in Wharfside Shopping Centre, Penzance, where it had been since 1 May 2009.

== History ==
Penwith Community Radio began with pre-recorded podcasts, the first played on 26 January 2008. Live internet broadcasts began on 1 May 2009, with the breakfast show, presented by Steve West. "We had almost 22,000 hits on our website over the first few days of May, and I believe that about 5,000 people logged on to us at some time or other from as far afield as Australia" Julian Horner, the original station manager commented.

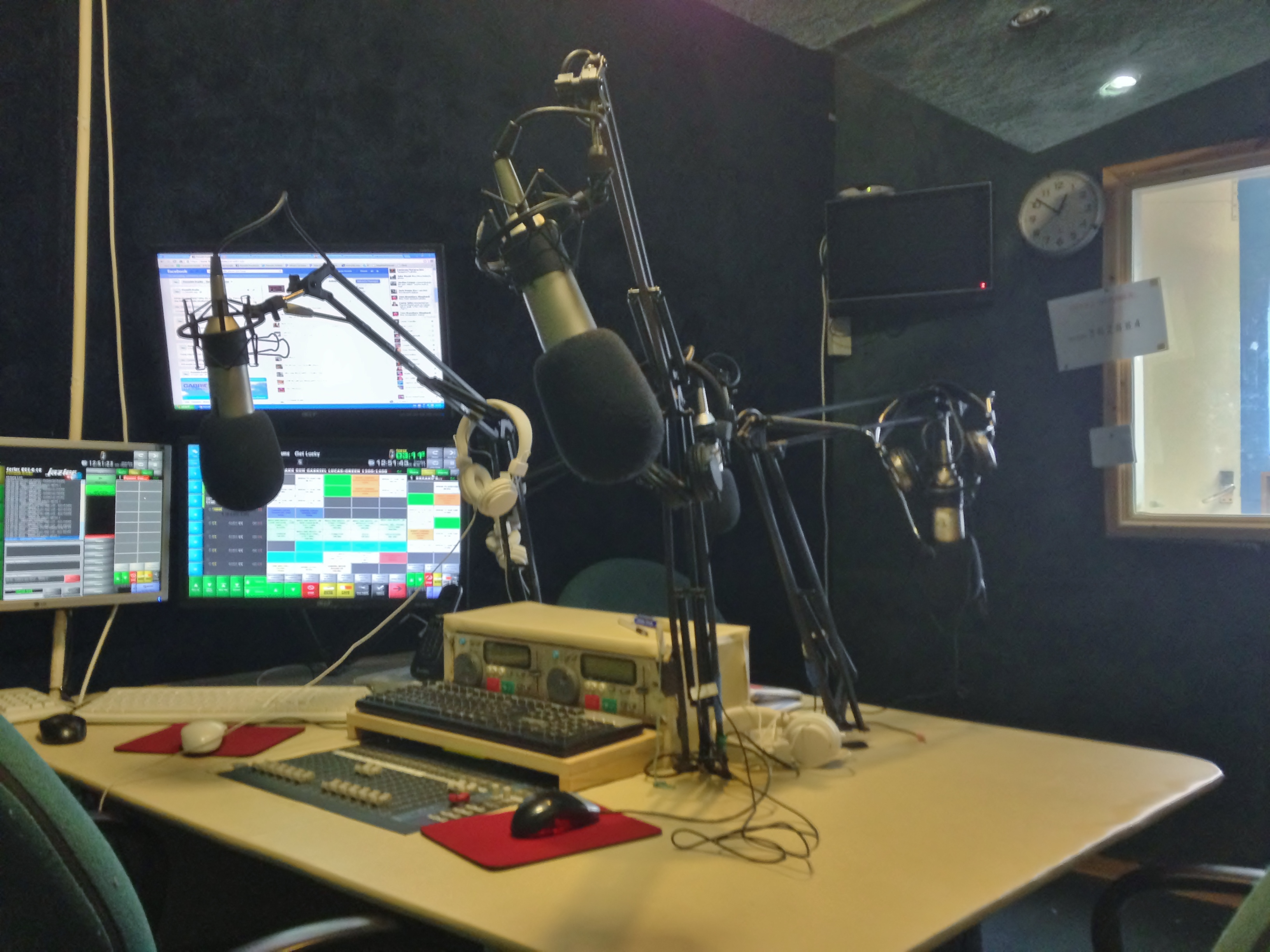
The former Penwith Radio studio at the Wharfside Shopping Centre, Penzance

On 4 May 2012, it was announced on Ofcom's official website that the radio station had successfully secured a full FM licence. On 22 March 2014, the station announced its FM frequencies. A statement on the radio station's website said it will "...broadcast on 96.5 FM to Penzance and the surrounding area, including Hayle and towards The Lizard, and for St Just, Pendeen, Sennen and the surrounding rural area on 97.2 FM." The station started broadcasting test transmissions on 14 August 2014 and officially launched onto FM as Penwith Radio on Saturday 30 August 2014 at 10am. Steve West hosted a pre-launch warm-up show from 8am, and Nick Dent took over from Steve for the FM launch party until 2pm.

=== Olympic Torch Relay coverage ===
On 19 May 2012, from 6:00 am, there was a special 'Good Morning Penwith with Martin Holland' with live reports at the historic start of the 2012 Olympic Torch Relay from Land's End. Presenters reported live from along the route and for the first time, Penwith Radio collaborated with two other Cornish community radio stations, Source FM and Radio St Austell Bay to cover more of the torch relay. Penwith's coverage was simulcast on both other community stations. This was one of the first times the station had broadcast live coverage of a local event.

=== Acker Bilk: his final interview ===
Clarinettist Acker Bilk recorded his final interview with former presenter John Chapman before dying from cancer at the age of 85. Chapman later commented: "Because of Acker's illness at the time of the interview his voice is soft at times and I had to carry and lead the conversation but it is an hour's life story and we have got the last ever one he did."

The interview was broadcast on Sunday 16 November 2014 at 9pm.

=== Re-brand to Coast FM ===
On 23 May 2016 it was announced on The Cornishman's website that on 5 November 2016, Penwith Radio would be re-branding as Coast FM. Chairman Alan Shepherd said: "Coast FM is a new and exciting name for a radio station that I hope the people of West Cornwall will take to their hearts and treat as their own. The name Penwith Radio has served us well but it's time for a new lick of paint and a re-focus on being the radio station of choice for radio listeners in West Cornwall". Nick Dent presented the launch programme for Coast FM on 5 November 2016 at 10am, and the Coast FM bus toured around the surrounding areas to celebrate the launch.

=== Expansion of service ===
In July 2023, following a successful bid to the broadcasting regulator, OFCOM announced it had awarded Coast FM an additional transmitter to cover the Hayle, St Ives and surrounding areas. The service will operate on 106.4 FM and is due on air spring / summer 2024.
