= Na h-Òganaich =

Scottish folk band

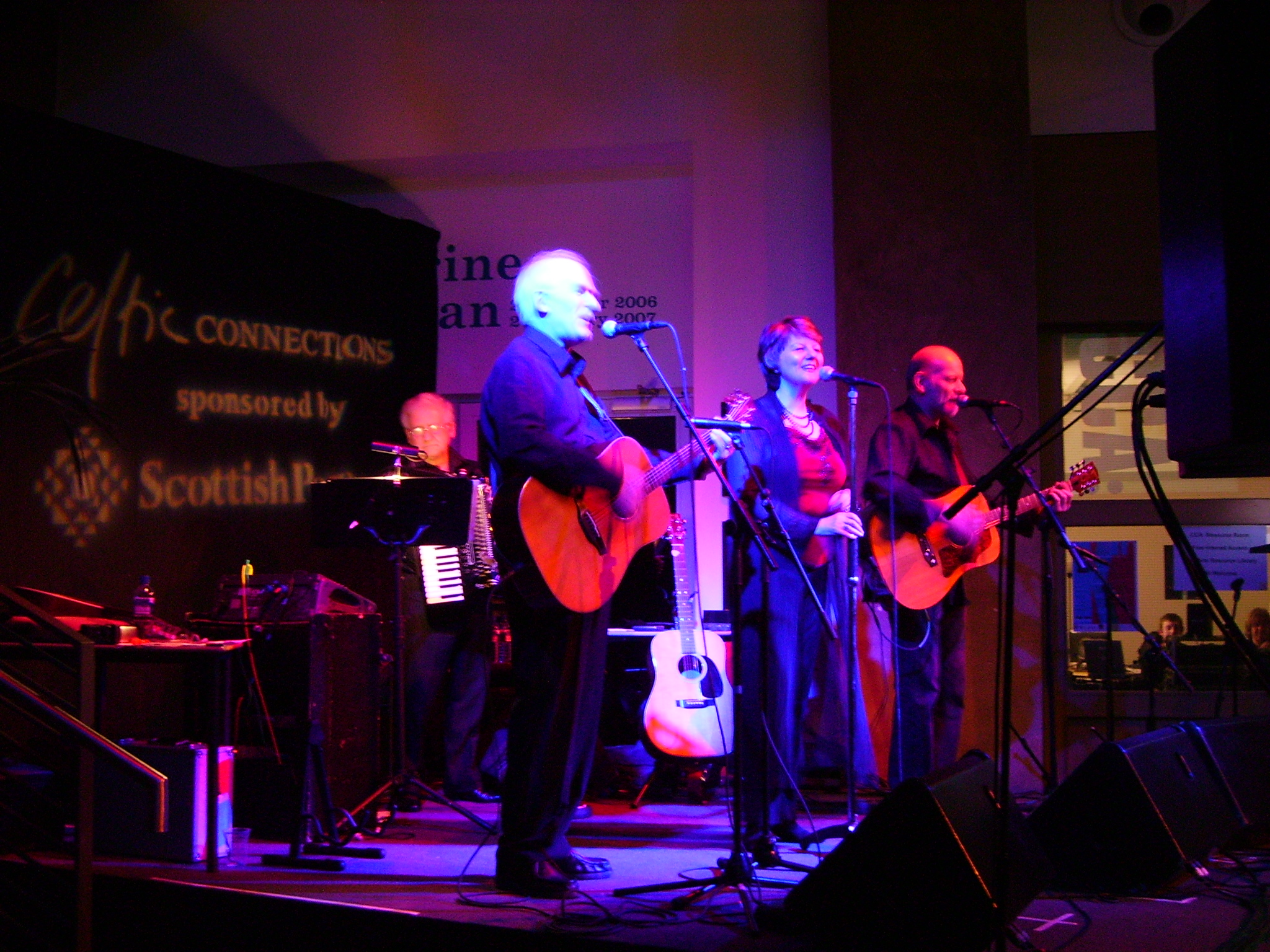
- Na h-Òganaich at Celtic Connections in 2007

Background information
- Also known as: 'the young ones' or 'young blood'
- Origin: Glasgow, Scotland
- Years active: 1971–1977, 1990–
- Labels: Beltona Sword; Macmeanmna
- Members: Margaret MacLeod; Noel Eadie; Donnie MacLeod
- Past members: Stuart Harrison

Na h-Òganaich are a Gaelic folk group, who recorded three albums 1971–1976 and a fourth in 2010. Initially Glasgow-based, the band performed on television and around the country before also travelling abroad to perform in other areas with celtic music interests. The band's name is Scottish Gaelic for 'the young ones' though often translated as 'young blood'. The group sparked some interest in gaelic music.

== History ==
Margaret MacLeod was a Gold Medallist at the Royal National Mòd in Oban in 1970, aged 22. Early in 1971, following a concert in Dunoon where Mod singer Margaret MacLeod first met guitarist Noel Eadie. She told Eadie that her brother Donnie was learning guitar, so a decision was made to form a trio. The MacLeods' parents had come from the Outer Hebrides and their mother’s sister, music teacher Annie MacKenzie, had spoken to them about the little-known "Melbost Bard" Murdo Macfarlane. A friend from the Isle of Lewis, Donnie MacLean, was working with the BBC and introduced them to recordings of Macfarlane.

The trio entered the Folk group at the Royal National Mòd in Stirling in October 1971, performed two of Macfarlane's songs Mhorag leat Shiubhlainn and Oran Cladaich and won the competition.

In April 1972, the group were selected by viewers of the light entertainment programme Se Ur Beatha to represent Scotland at Pan-Celtic Festival in Killarney, Ireland. Eadie was injured in a car crash and Stuart Harrison stood in. They performed another of Macfarlane's songs Mi le m' Uillinn and won the New Song competition. By December 1972 they were readying to release as a LP. They went on to have engagements throughout the Celtic Language speaking world: in England, Canada, Wales and Brittany.

The group recorded three albums for the Beltona Sword label, a branch of Decca Records - The Great Gaelic Sound of Na h-Òganaich (1972), Gael Force Three (1973) and Scot-Free (1975).

The MacLeods played as Na h-Òganaich in Ottawa, Canada in 1975.

In 1976 Na h-Òganaich were invited to participate in an extended tour of the US. Eadie was working as a college lecturer and unable to take part. Margaret and Donnie proceeded to tour, and later perform back in the UK, as a duo with backing musicians. In 1979 she wrote the song that Scotland would perform at the Pan-Celtic festival and was selected to perform it there. Margaret had continued to sing professionally with accordionist Billy Anderson. By 1978 Donnie was pursuing a solo career as a singer-guitarist and comedian, then in the 1980s became a TV performer and presenter with the children's Gaelic TV programme Dotaman on BBC Scotland. Since 1978 Eadie had been living and working in education on the Isle of Lewis. Eadie set up a recording studio Tong, Lewis and released tracks on his Croft Recordings label in 1979.

Scottish Celtic rock band Runrig, which formed on the Isle of Skye in 1973, had been influenced by the band, citing their first album in particular.

The original group has reformed on several occasions. In 1990, they played at the Moir Hall in Glasgow and notably at Fèis nan Còisir in Stornoway and at Celtic Connections in Glasgow in 2007.

In 2009 they were inducted to the Scottish traditional music hall of fame, for services to Gaelic. That year they played two concerts in Stornoway. They release an album Gun Stad on the Macmeanmna label. In 2010 BBC Alba broadcast a 60 minute programme on the group. The film won the factual entertainment category at the Celtic Media Festival in Western Isles in 2011.

They have played Celtic Connections and the Hebridean Celtic Festival. In 2017 they appeared at the Centre for Contemporary Arts in Glasgow.
