= Ailig Dòmhnallach =

Scottish Gaelic broadcaster

Ailig Dòmhnallach (died 2017) was a Scottish broadcaster on Radio nan Gàidheal; his brother, Finlay J. Dòmhnallach, was also a broadcaster. He was born and raised in Sgarastadh on the Isle of Harris.

As a young man he was famous for his athletic ability, for which he was chosen to teach PE in Harris and later Inverness. He delivered many programs on Radio nan Gàidheal over many years. He was especially known for the program Na Dùrachdan ("The Wishes"), but he was also involved in Aithris na Maidne ("Morning Report") at one time, and the other programs Cuireamaid Ceist ("Let's Ask a Question") and Fonn is Aria ("Melodies and Arias"). Dòmhnallach spent years in Inverness where he and his wife, Sheila, raised two children. He died in March 2017 after a spell of illness.
