= 1979 in Scottish television =

This is a list of events in Scottish television from 1979.

== Events ==
- 16 March - The American educational series for preschoolers Sesame Street begins airing for the first time on Scottish Television.
- 3 May - Television coverage of the 1979 general election.
- 10 July - Grampian Television drop their plans to record and broadcast the memorial service to be held in Buckie for the six crew members of a fishing boat lost in waters off Orkney, following a request from family members.
- 12 July - Garnock Way concludes after three years on air. It is axed to make way for Take the High Road, which would be shown across the ITV network. ITV had rejected Garnock Way because they wanted, in their words, "lots of Scotch Lochs and Hills". The new soap was a bigger budget affair and more in keeping with the 'tartan' perception of Scotland as it was deliberately set in a more beautiful part of Scotland.
- Unknown - BBC 1 Scotland airs Can Seo, a 20-part series teaching Scottish Gaelic. Can Seo means "Say This" in Gaelic.
- Unknown - Broadcast of the television film A Sense of Freedom about the Glasgow gangster Jimmy Boyle.

== Debuts ==
=== BBC ===
- 13 June - The Omega Factor on BBC 1 (1979)
- Unknown - Can Seo on BBC 1 Scotland (1979)

=== ITV ===
- 16 March - (United States) Sesame Street on Scottish Television (1969–present)
- Unknown - A Sense of Freedom on Scottish Television (1981)

== Television series ==
- Scotsport (1957–2008)
- Reporting Scotland (1968–1983; 1984–present)
- Top Club (1971–1998)
- Scotland Today (1972–2009)
- Sportscene (1975–Present)
- The Beechgrove Garden (1978–Present)

== Ending this year ==
- 15 August - The Omega Factor (1979)
- Unknown - Garnock Way (1976–1979)

== Births ==
- 23 January - Dawn Porter, television presenter and writer
- 28 January - Ainslie Henderson, singer-songwriter
- 2 February - David Paisley, actor
- 21 April - James McAvoy, actor

== Deaths ==
- 9 July - Roddy McMillan, 56, actor and playwright
- 24 July - Archie Duncan, 65, actor

== See also ==
- 1979 in Scotland
