= Tide (TV series) =

Television documentary series

- Irish: Taoide
- Scottish Gaelic: An Làn
- Welsh: Llanw
- Genre: documentary
- Narrated by: MacDara Ó Cuaig (Irish edition); Heledd Cynwal (Welsh edition)
- Countries of origin: Republic of Ireland; United Kingdom
- Original languages: Irish, English, Welsh, Scottish Gaelic
- No. of seasons: 1
- No. of episodes: 3

Production
- Production locations: Bay of Fundy; Svalbard; Galway Bay; Zhejiang; River Severn; Orkney; Xiapu County; Gulf of Corryvreckan
- Running time: 50 minutes per episode

Original release
- Network: BBC Alba; BBC Northern Ireland; S4C; TG4
- Release: May 1 – May 15, 2019

Tide (Irish: Taoide; Scottish Gaelic: An Làn; Welsh: Llanw) is an Irish/Scottish/Welsh documentary TV series about the tide, the seas and human action on both.

Filmed in Ireland, Great Britain, China, Norway, the Netherlands and Canada, it is a coproduction by TG4 (Ireland; Irish), BBC Alba (Scotland; Scottish Gaelic), BBC Northern Ireland, S4C (Wales; Welsh) and the Chinese broadcaster LIC.

The series was pitched at the 2017 Celtic Media Festival and was part of the 2019 International Year of Indigenous Languages. It was created with a £600,000 STG budget.

== Episodes ==
These broadcast dates are for TG4 and BBC Alba, the first stations to air the documentaries.

No.	Title	Original release date
1	"Understanding the Tide"	May 1, 2019
2	"Living with the Tide"	May 8, 2019
3	"Harnessing the Tide"	May 15, 2019
