= Baile Mhuilinn =

Baile Mhuilinn is a Scottish Gaelic television series for children. The first series was broadcast in 1998.

Baile Mhuilinn features comedian and entertainer Tormod MacGill-Eain as the Miller, his pantomime horse Eachann, and alternating characters played by Màiri NicAonghais and Dàibhidh Walker. The format is standard: a dialogue in the mill includes songs sung by Eachann, and the company then move to a lounge where the miller reads a story.

Together with the radio series Fiream Faram, broadcast the same year, Baile Mhuilinn was the first specially devised education series aimed at children in the early stages of immersion-phase language-learning. The spread of Gaelic medium education in Scotland and also Gaelic pre-school provision led to many children attending immersion programmes even though Gaelic was not used in their homes. Baile Mhuilinn pitches its language at the needs of this group.

== See also ==
- Gaelic broadcasting in Scotland
