= Cuide ri Cathy =

Cuide ri Cathy (Introduced by Cathy) is a television interview series created by mneTV for BBC Alba, presented by Cathy MacDonald, where she spends a day in the life of a Scottish celebrity.

== Episodes ==
=== Series 1 ===
- Gail Porter – Television presenter.
- Aggie MacKenzie – Television personality and cleaning guru.
- Kirsty Wark – Presenter on Newsnight.
- Irvine Welsh – Author.
- Andrea McLean – Former weather presenter on GMTV and presenter on Loose Women.
- Mike Blair – Scottish rugby captain.
- David Lunan – Church of Scotland moderator.
- Carol Kirkwood – Weather presenter on BBC Breakfast.
- Donnie Munro – Former Runrig singer.
- Nick Nairn – TV chef.

=== Series 2 ===
- Liz McColgan – Olympic athlete.
- Chick Young – BBC Scotland sports reporter.
- Alex Norton – Taggart star.
- Aileen McGlynn – Paralympic athlete.
- Jackie Stewart – Racing car driver.
- Una McLean – Veteran actress.
- Leon Jackson – X Factor winner and singer.
- Hardeep Singh Kohli – Presenter and comedian.
