= Blackbird (2013 film) =

2013 Drama film

- DVD cover
- Directed by: Jamie Chambers
- Written by: Jamie Chambers; John Craine; Robyn Pete
- Produced by: James Barrett
- Starring: Norman Maclean; Sheila Stewart; Margaret Bennett; Scarlett Mack; Andrew Rothney; Patrick Wallace
- Cinematography: John Craine
- Edited by: Martin McEwan
- Music by: Martyn Bennett; Jamie Chambers; Duncan Strachan
- Production companies: Deerstalker Films; Transgressive North
- Distributed by: Verve Pictures
- Release date: 27 September 2013 (Edinburgh International Film Festival)
- Running time: 90 minutes
- Country: United Kingdom
- Language: English

Blackbird is a 2013 drama film written and directed by Jamie Chambers. The film stars Scottish Gaelic actor and comedian Norman Maclean (Scottish Gaelic: Tormod MacGill-Eain) alongside Scottish folklorist and singer Margaret Bennett and Traditional Folk singer Sheila Stewart. Actors Scarlett Mack, Andrew Rothney and Patrick Wallace also appear.

== Plot ==
Ruadhan, a young Scottish man and folk singer living in a small Scotland village, tries to preserve the local culture with help of his older mentor, Alec.

== Cast ==
- Andrew Rothney as Ruadhan
- Scarlett Mack as Amy
- Norman Maclean as Alec
- Sheila Stewart as Lorna
- Margaret Bennett as Isabella
- Sarah Sunderland as Jenny
- Robert Turner as Ewan
- Gayle Mccutcheon as Kathy
- Deborah Whyte as Sofia
- Isabella Baronello as Maureen
- Allan Thornton as Nigel
- Christopher W. Hammond as Mike
- Carolyn Galloway as Postmistress
- Sara Pearce as Girl at Harbour
- Patrick Wallace as Callum

== Accolades ==
In 2013 Blackbird was nominated for the Scottish BAFTA Audience Award, the Audience Award at Cambridge Film Festival, and the Michael Powell Award for Best British Feature Film at Edinburgh International Film Festival and won the 'Catty Award' for Narrative Feature at Catskill Mountains Film Festival, US. Blackbird won two awards in 2014 - the Festival Award for Best International Film at Laughlin International Film Festival and an honorable mention at the 2014 New Jersey Film Festival.

== Critical reception ==
The Guardian, “Blackbird sings in praise of Scotland's cultural history.”

Screen Daily, “Beautifully shot and knowingly artistic.”

The Scotsman, “It’s a film that is astute about the competing cultures of modern stylings and older traditions.”
