= Fañch Broudig =

Breton journalist and writer

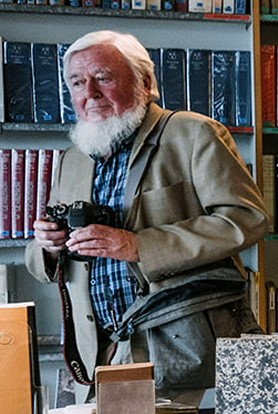
Broudig in 2019

Fañch Broudig or François Broudic (born 1946 in Buhulien) is a Breton journalist and Breton- and French-language writer.

From 1964 to 2007, he broadcast in Breton on the France 3 Bretagne radio station, then from 1971 on television as well.

He is president of the cultural foundation Emgleo Breiz, which promotes the Breton language and its teaching.

== Publications ==
- Roll al leoriou hag ar pennadou bet embannet e brezoneg e 1973 = Bibliographie des publications en langue bretonne. Année 1973. In: Studi, n°1, Kerzu/Décembre 1974
- Roll al leoriou hag ar pennadou bet embannet e brezoneg e 1974 = Bibliographie des publications en langue bretonne. Année 1974. In: Studi, n°5, Ebrel/Avril 1976
- Roll al leoriou hag ar pennadou bet embannet e brezoneg e 1975 = Bibliographie des publications en langue bretonne. Année 1975. In: Studi, n°10, Genver/Janvier 1979
- Ar bed o trei. Eun dibab a skridou a-vremañ evid ar skoliou brezoneg. Brest: Ar Helenner, 1983.
- Langue et littérature bretonne. Dix ans de bibliographie. 1973-1982. Brest: Brud Nevez, 1984.
- Taolennou ar baradoz, Le Chasse-Marée / Ed. de l'Estran, Douarnenez, 1988, ISBN 2-903708-15-0
- Evolution de la pratique du breton de la fin de l'Ancien Régime à nos jours, thesis, University of Western Brittany, Brest, 1993
- Roparz, Jakez hag o diskibien, Ar Skol Vrezoneg, Brest, 1993, ISBN 2-906373-31-1
- La pratique du breton de l'Ancien Régime à nos jours, Presses Universitaires Rennes II, 1995, ISBN 2868471285
- L'interdiction du breton en 1902. La IIIe République contre les langues régionales Coop Breizh, Spézet, 1996, ISBN 2-909924-78-5
- À la recherche de la frontière. La limite linguistique entre Haute et Basse-Bretagne aux XIXe et XXe siècles, Ar skol vrezoneg, Brest, 1997, ISBN 2-906373-44-3
- Combes a-eneb ar brezoneg, Brud Nevez, Brest, 1998, ISBN 978-2-86775-174-5
- Histoire de la langue bretonne, Editions of Ouest-France, Rennes, 1999, ISBN 2-7373-2495-5

== See also ==
- List of Celtic-language media
