= Young Films =

Young Films is a production company based at Sabhal Mòr Ostaig on Skye and headed by Chris Young. It produced The Inbetweeners Movie, Seachd: The Inaccessible Pinnacle, and Bannan. The company was originally founded in London, but relocated to Skye in 2014.

A project of Young Films is the Young Films Foundation, a programme to train young filmmakers in Scotland and connect them with the wider UK and international film industry through residential courses. In 2021, the Young Films Foundation announced a year long Screenwriting Programme for new & upcoming writers, which includes a script commission fee for participating writers and mentorship by a leading industry expert.
