= Dòtaman =

- Genre: Children's
- Presented by: Donnie Macleod; Rhoda Macleod; Anne Sinclair; Cathy MacDonald; John Urquhart; Mairi Macinnes; Anna Murray
- Country of origin: United Kingdom (Scotland)
- Original language: Scottish Gaelic

Original release
- Network: BBC One Scotland
- Release: 17 October 1985 – 8 December 2000

Dòtaman (Scottish Gaelic for "spinning top") is the longest running Scottish Gaelic children's TV programme for pre-schoolers. It began 17 October 1985 starring Donnie Macleod, formerly of Na h-Òganaich, whose appearances made him a cult figure. Donnie was primarily the singer across the many series of the programme. The programme featured a presenter who carried the bulk of the programme presentation although Donnie shared some of the role, particularly when telling the time at the end of the programme.

== Presenters ==
The presenters were: Donnie Macleod, Rhoda Macleod, Cathy Macdonald, John Urquhart, Gaelic singers Màiri MacInnes and Anna Murray also presented the programme. The first series also featured Anne Sinclair as the singer. She didn't wear hats and accompanied herself on a pink piano.

== Premise ==
Donnie wore various different silly hats, which were decorated with something relevant to the song and the programme. Donnie was often seen wearing a default seagull hat when the theme didn't lend itself to be illustrated with a hat. Many of the hats were designed and constructed by costume designer Kirsty Colam.

The programme featured 6 puppets. Nelson and Napoleon are a pair of parrots who squawk their way through the 'what's the time' sequence at the end. Cagnaidh the dog and Crotal the rabbit were usually involved with the activities at the opening of the programme. Oighrig the hippo and Ealasaid the elephant mainly sat about and listened to stories.

The songs were about everyday things that matter to children, while the style and structure of the songs were traditionally Gaelic. The songs were written to a pre-determined theme by a team of scriptwriters with each writer being responsible for a few programmes across the series. Both Donnie and some of the scriptwriters set the lyrics to music. Most of the songs related to Gaelic culture or Scottish rural life.

The show's theme tune was "Scarecrow Wedding" by Bobby Heath, Eric Peters and Robert Hunter from the Spectrum Moods Library of which was previously used for the theme to The Further Adventures of Noddy (a standalone pilot based on Enid Blyton's books of the 'Toyland' series).

== Influence ==
It could be argued that most young Gaelic speakers today learned much of their early vocabulary from the programme. Many young singers and musicians were influenced by the style of the music to write and play in their own tradition.

Dòtaman is referenced in the 2019 song 'Fairytale of Stornoway' by Western isles band Peat and Diesel, featuring Mairead Fay Nicholson. The song is a reworked version of the Pogues classic 'Fairytale of New York' and is making a bid for Christmas Number 1.

== See also ==
- Gaelic broadcasting in Scotland
