= Can Seo =

1979 television series

Can Seo is a television series teaching Scottish Gaelic that initially started broadcasting in 1979 on BBC1 Scotland. The television series lasted for 20 weeks. Additionally, a textbook, cassette and vinyl LP were produced to accompany the series. The programme had an estimated audience of around 200,000 viewers. 'Can Seo' means 'Say This' in Scottish Gaelic.

== See also ==
- Speaking our Language – a series teaching Gaelic, produced by STV in the 1990s.
