= Bannan (TV series) =

2014–2022 Scottish Gaelic-language television series on BBC Alba

Bannan (English title: The Ties That Bind) is a Scottish Gaelic-language television series produced by Young Films and first broadcast by BBC Alba in 2014. It tells the story of the return of Màiri MacDonald from Glasgow to the Gaelic-speaking island where she had been brought up, where she comes to terms with the family drama that had caused her to leave eight years earlier. The title, Bannan, is the Gaelic word for "family bonds".

In 2017 the show was renewed for an additional four years. Its eighth and final season was broadcast in December 2021, with the finale airing on New Year's Day 2022.

== Main cast ==
- Debbie MacKay as Màiri
- Dòl Eoin MacKinnon as Alasdair
- Iain MacRae as Tormod
- Ali MacLennan as Iain
- Alastair MacKay as Donneil
- Màiri Morrison as Iseabail
- Ellen MacDonald as Ciorstaidh
- Ange MacKay as Sarah Jane
- Màiri MacLennan as Isla

== See also ==
- Gaelic broadcasting in Scotland
