= Speaking our Language =

- Title Card
- Genre: Language Learning
- Written by: Dr. Richard Cox, Anne Lorne Gillies
- Directed by: Anne Buckland / Ken MacGregor
- Presented by: Rhoda MacDonald
- Voices of: Iain MacRae
- Theme music composer: Phil Cunningham
- Opening theme: Performed by Wolfstone
- Original languages: English and Scottish Gaelic
- No. of seasons: 4
- No. of episodes: 72

Production
- Executive producer: Rhoda MacDonald
- Producers: Amanda Berry (Series 1 & 2); Anne Lorne Gillies (Series 3 & 4); Erina Rayner (Series 4)
- Production locations: Scotland, United Kingdom
- Editors: Andy Boyd, Pat Doherty
- Running time: 25 minutes
- Production company: Scottish Television

Original release
- Network: Scottish Television; Grampian Television
- Release: 9 January 1993 – 22 November 1996

Speaking our Language is a Scottish Gaelic learners' television programme that ran from 9 January 1993 to 22 November 1996. Running for 72 episodes through four series, the series was produced by Scottish Television and presented by Rhoda MacDonald, STV's then-head of Gaelic output. It was frequently repeated on TeleG and is now repeated on BBC Alba, and all four series have been released on DVD.

The series was based on Now You're Talking, a similar Welsh-language learners' series broadcast on S4C and developed by Acen, a resource service for Welsh learners, who acted as programme consultants for Speaking our Language.

== Structure ==
Each episode begins with Rhoda introducing where it was recorded and what it will cover. Each set of new phrases is introduced by Rhoda and then followed by some short dramatisations which show examples of how the words and phrases are used. Once an episode an extended drama (with a continuing story line through the series) is used to give a deeper example of how the vocabulary introduced in the episode can be used. In the first two series the drama is called Aig an taigh (At Home), following a family who have moved to Glasgow and are settling into life there; whereas in last two series the drama for intermediate learners Càirdeas (Friendship) is about the complexity of love and friendship among the protagonists – Ceit, Anna, Iseabail, Tormod, Iain, Seumas, Murchadh, Bill, Eòghainn etc. The episodes are summed up during the episode and at the end with the voice over going over the phrases introduced.
