= Dè a-nis? =

- Also known as: What Now?
- Genre: Children's
- Presented by: Derek MacIntosh; Megan MacLellan; Annabel MacLennan; Kim Carnie; Mark Smith
- Country of origin: Scotland
- Original language: Scottish Gaelic
- No. of series: 25

Production
- Running time: 50 minutes (1993–95); 45 minutes (1995–2000); 60 minutes (2000–2015); 30 minutes (2015–2018)

Original release
- Network: BBC Alba
- Release: 30 September 1993 – 6 August 2018

Dè a-nis? (Note: Scottish Gaelic pronunciation: [tʲe əˈniʃ], English: What Now?) is a Scottish Gaelic-language children's programme produced by BBC Gàidhlig. It was broadcast on BBC Alba on Wednesday nights at 6:00pm.

== History ==
Launched on 30 September 1993 as part of an improved line-up of Scottish Gaelic-language programmes, Dè a-nis? was originally produced by CTG (Commataidh Telebhisein Gàidhlig). Originally, no presenters were used and individual programmes were used to fill up the hour. Until 2011 the programme was broadcast on BBC Two Scotland on Thursdays at 6pm, but with digital switch over the series was broadcast on BBC Alba.

== Magazine format ==
Starting from 1996, a magazine format was used with live presenters, pop music, special reports, cartoons and viewers contacting the show. In 2012, all the cartoons were dropped.

== Specials ==
Dè a-nis? often presented special episodes covering a particular event, such as the opening of Bun-sgoil Ghàidhlig Inbhir Nis, St. Patrick's Day from Dublin and Galway and the Royal National Mòd. For Children in Need 2007, Dè a-nis ran a number of events including Eilidh and Jo (from Aileag) cycling the length of the Western Isles and Sarah and Calum abseiling on the BBC Pacific Quay building and raising £865.

== Programming ==
- Dealbhan Beo (1993–1995)
- Mirean Measgaichte (1993–1995)
- Orain agus Rannan (1993–1995)
- Mire Mara (1993–1995)
- Spot the Dog (1993–1995)
- Noddy's Toyland Adventures (1994–1995)
- Iris, The Happy Professor (1994–1995)
- The Animals of Farthing Wood (1996–1997)
- Rugrats (1997–1999)
- Dennis the Menace (1998–1999)
- Rocket Power (2000–2001)

== Presenters ==
- Derek MacIntosh
- Kim Carnie
- Megan MacLellan
- Annabel MacLennan
- Mark Smith
- Màiri MacInnes
- John Urquhart
- Flora Anne MacLean
- Tony Kearney
- Evelyn Coull
- Martin MacDonald
- Somhairle MacDonald
- Calum MacAulay
- Siobhan MacInnes
- Colin MacLeod
- Padraig MacQueen
- Rhoda Meek
- Shona Morrison
- Shannon McFarlane (voice only)
- Eilidh MacLennan
- Penny Fraser (nee MacInnes)
- Roddy MacKay
- Lisa MacKinnon
