= Eòrpa =

BBC Scotland current affairs programme

- Created by: Ken MacQuarrie, BBC Alba
- Presented by: Annabel Maclennan; Andrew Mackinnon
- Country of origin: United Kingdom
- Original language: Scottish Gaelic

Production
- Producer: BBC Gàidhlig
- Running time: 30 minutes

Original release
- Network: BBC Alba
- Release: April 1993 – present

Eòrpa (Europe) is a long-running Scottish Gaelic-language current affairs programme broadcast on BBC Alba. It covers political and social issues affecting Europe, the UK and Scotland, including issues affecting the Western Isles. It is broadcast weekly in Scottish Gaelic with English subtitles.

The series has been running since April 1993. It is funded by the Gaelic Media Service and produced by BBC Gàidhlig. Eòrpa is shown on BBC Alba weekly and used to be shown on BBC Two Scotland until its closure in 2019 for the new BBC Scotland channel.

== Reputation ==
Eòrpa hit the headlines in May 2008, specially mentioned in the Scottish Broadcasting Commission report. Blair Jenkins, Chair of the Scottish Broadcasting Commission said: "It was intriguing to note that without fail at every one of our public events BBC2 Scotland's Eòrpa programme was raised, unsolicited, and by non-Gaelic speakers, as an example of a positive, well-respected programme".

== Awards ==
The programme has been credited with awards, including Scottish BAFTAs and an RTS Scotland Award.

== See also ==
- Seachd Là, a Scottish Gaelic-language news programme
- An Là, a Scottish Gaelic-language news programme
