= Radio St Austell Bay =

Radio station in Cornwall, England

Coordinates: 50.326843°N 4.790387°W

CHAOS Radio
England
- Broadcast area: St Austell, United Kingdom
- Frequency: 105.6 MHz FM

Programming
- Format: Varied

Ownership
- Owner: Radio St Austell Bay CIC
- Operator: CHAOS Digital

History
- First air date: Monday 28 January 2008
- Former names: Radio St Austell Bay

Links
- Website: CHAOS Radio

CHAOS Radio (formerly known as Radio St Austell Bay and RSAB, often incorrectly called St Austell Bay Radio) is a non-profit, community radio station. The radio station is funded by a combination of grants from the National Lottery and the Arts Council, alongside a small amount of commercial advertising and sponsorship. Partners include the Eden Project, the Lost Gardens of Heligan, and the Cornish Guardian. All of the partners present shows on the station, alongside the regular DJs.

RSAB ran a Short Term RSL in February 2006 and presented their community programmes for 2 weeks. The response to the station suggested a desire for such a full-time service. RSAB's signal from Tregorrick Park (90 metres AMSL) could be picked up as far away as Plymouth whilst operating within OFCOM regulations.

In February 2007 OFCOM granted Radio St Austell Bay a community radio station licence. The station started broadcasting on 28 January 2008, on 105.6FM and online.

RSAB broadcasts from a transmitter at Tregorrick Park (Home of St Austell RFC), which is in St Austell.

As its name suggests, Radio St Austell Bay covers the whole area from Tywardreath in the east to Sticker in the west, without focusing solely on St Austell town itself. St Austell is one of the largest settlements and the St Austell Bay area (population 34,700) is the second largest conurbation in Cornwall, after the Camborne-Pool-Redruth area (population 55,400).

Radio St Austell Bay also promotes and broadcasts live music events, in the bar adjacent to the studio at Tregorrick Park. Other live broadcasts have included The Eden Project's Arts Café, Tanya's Courage Sing For Courage 2008, and a 2-day broadcast from the offices of the Cornish Guardian in St Austell, for publicity.

Starting in 2014 Radyo an Gernewegva, an hour-long magazine programme in the Cornish language, is being broadcast every Sunday at midday.

In 2023 RSAB agreed a new partnership with a local group and relaunched as CHAOS Radio on 26th June 2023. The station will continue to offer a wide range of programming, featuring “Feel Good Music”, national and local news bulletins, talk shows, community events and live broadcasts on location. Also with the rebrand the station moved to a new space from the original Tregorrick Park Studio.
