= Source FM =

Radio station in Cornwall, England

England
- Broadcast area: Falmouth and Penryn: FM; Worldwide: Internet radio
- Frequencies: FM: 96.1; Worldwide:

Programming
- Languages: English, Cornish
- Format: Music, talk show

Ownership
- Owner: Local community

History
- First air date: 27 February 2009

Links
- Website: http://www.thesourcefm.co.uk

Source FM is a community radio station, for the combined Falmouth and Penryn community and the wider area.

== History ==
The idea to create a community radio station in the Falmouth and Penryn area goes back to 2006, when Russell Clarke, former Source FM director, made a successful licence application to Ofcom. Source FM first aired on 28 February 2009 with a strong focus on Cornish events and music, broadcasting over 100 hours of original programming every week. A year later in 2010 Source FM had over 100 volunteer presenters ranging in age from 8 to 80 years old, presenting 56 programmes every week broadcasting live from 9 am until 11 pm every day.

Source moved to a working from home model during the pandemic 2020 - 22 and is now Broadcasting from Studio and home.

Programmes range from soul music to rock, hip hop and dubstep, depending on the time and day. All shows are written, presented and recorded entirely by volunteers. While the majority of shows are music-based, there are also, topical debate shows such as The One and All Show and specialist LGBT programming in the form of 'The Rainbow Source' and many others.

Source FM is also responsible for creating a community produced radio drama 'Carrick Roads'. Since 2013, Source FM host six live music events in Kimberley Park, Falmouth called Parklive every year.

== Broadcast ==
Source FM is broadcast on FM frequency 96.1, available throughout Falmouth and Penryn. At first, Source FM was broadcast from the University College Falmouth, Tremough campus. Currently Source FM has its own studios in Tregenver Road, Falmouth. The webstream via the Listen Live feature on the website has been available since the launch of the station, and is accessible worldwide. In early 2012 Source FM joined the Radioplayer Internet streaming service founded by the BBC and The Guardian. Podcasts of the radio shows are also available on Source FM's website.

== Achievements ==
Source FM won the 'Investor in Work Related Learning' award, for delivering a weekly radio club for Falmouth Primary Schools. Source FM also broadcast Cornwall's first LGBT radio show, Rainbow Source, every Wednesday. In 2019, Source FM was awarded Gold and Silver in the "Live Event or Outside Broadcast" category of the Community Radio Awards.
