= TeleG =

Defunct Scottish Gaelic television channel

- Country: United Kingdom

Ownership
- Owner: SDN Ltd

History
- Launched: 31 October 1999
- Closed: 23 May 2011
- Replaced by: BBC Alba (launched on 8 June 2011 on Freeview)

Availability (at time of closure)

Terrestrial
- Freeview: Channel 8 (in Scotland)

TeleG was established as the first daily digital Gaelic TV channel in Scotland on 31 October 1999, and was available on the Freeview platform until 23 May 2011. The channel was based in Stornoway.

Programs were transmitted on TeleG between 6 pm and 7 pm each day. The channel slot was shared with the CITV channel (which broadcast from 6 am to 6 pm) and ITV2 +1 (which broadcast from 7 pm to 6 am).

The Broadcasting Act of 1996 required that programs aired would be repeats transmitted on analogue channels (many of which are first shown outside peak hours) between 6pm and 10:30pm. The Communications Act 2003 created the Gaelic Media Service which decides on the future development of Gaelic Broadcasting services.

The broadcaster and service provider of TeleG was SDN, the company which holds the license for DTT multiplex A. SDN, then owned by NTL, S4C and United Business Media, was awarded the Multiplex A licence in May 1998. Part of the capacity on Multiplex A was reserved for services provided by Channel 5, S4C in Wales and Gaelic programming in Scotland. SDN was purchased by ITV plc in 2005. At launch, it was only available from Rosemarkie covering central Scotland; the Eitshal transmitter would follow in January 2000.

TeleG initially continued to broadcast after the launch of BBC Alba on 19 September 2008. At launch BBC Alba was only available on satellite television before later being added to cable. TeleG would continue to broadcast until the BBC Trust had reviewed the performance of BBC Alba and announced their decision on whether they would recommend carriage of BBC Alba on Freeview.

In December 2010, the BBC Trust approved a plan put forward by BBC management which would see the thirteen BBC Radio stations which broadcast on Freeview removed from the platform in Scotland during the hours of BBC Alba's broadcast to free up capacity for the TV channel to operate. The radio services would not be affected outside Scotland, and the affected BBC radio stations would continue to be available on other platforms in Scotland including: DAB digital radio, FM/AM (where applicable), satellite and cable TV and online. A date for the change to be brought in has yet to be confirmed, and as the service would broadcast on the BBC's public service multiplex, the effect that this would have on TeleG was not clear. The plans were later revised to allow BBC Radio 1Xtra, 5 Live and 6 Music to continue broadcasting alongside BBC Alba. During its run, the arrangement between TeleG and SDN raised £2.5 million to Stornoway's economy.

It was confirmed on 22 May 2011, that TeleG would close on 23 May, with BBC Alba launched on 8 June 2011, using its old EPG number on Freeview.
