= BBC Radio nan Gàidheal =

Scottish Gaelic-language radio station in Scotland

- Logo used since 2022
- Stornoway and Inverness; Scotland
- Broadcast area: Scotland (Note: Scotland only on FM, DAB and Freeview, available via BBC Sounds and satellite/cable television for rest of the UK)
- Frequencies: FM: 103.5–105 MHz; DAB; Freeview: 712 (Scotland only); Freesat: 713 (110); Sky (UK only): 0126 (117); Virgin Media: 934 (120)
- RDS: BBC Gael

Programming
- Languages: Scottish Gaelic; English
- Format: News, music, sport, talk, entertainment

Ownership
- Owner: BBC
- Operator: BBC Radio nan Gàidheal
- Sister stations: BBC Radio Scotland, BBC Radio Shetland, BBC Radio Orkney

History
- First air date: 1 October 1985; 41 years ago
- Former names: BBC Radio Nan Eilean, BBC Air A'Ghaidhealtachd
- Former frequencies: 990 MW (until 23 November 2015)

Technical information
- Licensing authority: Ofcom
- Transmitter coordinates: 58.9753°N 3.0842°W

Links
- Webcast: BBC Sounds
- Website: BBC Radio nan Gàidheal

BBC Radio nan Gàidheal (['nə ˈŋɛː.əl̪ˠ]; lit. 'Radio of the Gaels') is a Scottish Gaelic-language radio station owned and operated by BBC Scotland, a division of the BBC. The station was launched in 1985 and broadcasts Gaelic-language programming with the simulcast of BBC Radio Scotland. Its headquarters is located on Seaforth Road, Stornoway, alongside BBC Alba and MG Alba.

The station is available from FM transmitters throughout Scotland. Its service licence states that "BBC Radio nan Gàidheal should be available every day for general reception across Scotland on FM"; it can also be heard on digital television platforms, DAB Digital Radio, and online.

BBC Radio nan Gàidheal programmes are also broadcast (with an in-vision graphical overlay) on the Scottish Gaelic digital television channel BBC Alba, during periods when the channel is not carrying television programmes.

== History ==
=== Background ===
Scottish Gaelic-language programming has been transmitted in Scotland since 1923, and the BBC's Gaelic-language department was established in 1935.

Launching on 17 May 1976, BBC Radio Highland produced a range of Gaelic programming – BBC Radio na Gaidhealtachd. It operated as a local opt-out from BBC Radio Scotland.

On 5 October 1979, the Scottish Gaelic service BBC Radio nan Eilean started broadcasting in Stornoway at 8:10 am with plans for additional studios at Portree and Benbecula. Like Radio Highland, it was a local opt-out of Radio Scotland.

=== BBC Radio nan Gàidheal ===
On 1 October 1985, these two separate services united to form BBC Radio nan Gàidheal. The main base for the station is on Seaforth Road in Stornoway, having moved in June 2014 from the Church Street studios.

== Coverage ==
Radio nan Gàidheal broadcasts for over 90 hours every week, and joins BBC Radio Scotland's medium-wave feed when they close transmission. Since BBC Radio Scotland itself joins BBC Radio 5 Live when it signs off, the same applies to Radio nan Gàidheal as well during parts of its sign-off time. Radio nan Gàidheal now frequently broadcasts important Scottish football matches providing Gaelic commentary.

Radio nan Gàidheal shows are available for 30 days after most recent broadcast on the BBC Sounds app and on the BBC's website.

Podcasts of some shows are available from the BBC website and on iTunes for some time after transmission. These include two programmes aimed at learners of the language, entitled Letter to Gaelic Learners and The Little Letter, the latter being a more basic version of the former. Both letters are also available at learngaelic.net, with transcripts.

== Funding ==
The service budget for 2009 was £3.9m with a change of any more than 10% requiring approval of the BBC Trust. The service budget in 2011 was almost the same as 2009 at £3.8m and requires the same controls as previous licences. This funding comes from the BBC Trust, the governing body of the BBC which is operationally independent of management and external bodies. As is the same with all BBC Radio and TV stations, the channel is funded by the licence fees gathered.

== See also ==
- List of Celtic-language media
- RTÉ Raidió na Gaeltachta – An Irish Gaelic station.
- BBC Alba – The BBC's Gaelic television channel.
