= Celtic Media Festival =

Music festival gathering in various locations

- Location: Celtic nations
- Founded: 1980
- Awards: Torc Awards for Excellence
- Directors: Catriona Logan
- Language: Scottish Gaelic, Irish, Welsh, Manx, Cornish and Breton
- Website: www.celticmediafestival.co.uk

The Celtic Media Festival, formerly known as the Celtic Film and Television Festival, aims to promote the languages and cultures of the Celtic nations in film, on television, radio and new media. The festival is an annual three-day celebration of broadcasting and film from Scotland, Ireland, Wales, Isle of Man, Galicia, Cornwall and Brittany. The festival was founded in 1980.

== History ==
The festival was first held in 1980, on the Scottish islands of South Uist and Benbecula. The 30th festival was held in March 2009 in Caernarfon, Wales. The 40th festival was held in Aviemore, Scotland. The festival presents the Torc Awards to the winners of 28 different categories.

The festival also presents a Gold Torc to the winner of Spirit of the Festival Award - a film or television programme wholly or substantially in a Celtic language that encapsulates the spirit of the Celtic Media Festival.

== Chairs ==
The Celtic Media Festival has been chaired by representatives from the broadcasting industry:

Irish Chairs:

- Áine Walsh, Northern Ireland Screen
- Alan Esslemont, TG4
- Pádhraic Ó Ciardha, TG4
- Neasa Ní Chinnéide, RTÉ
- Bob Collins, RTÉ
- Con Bushe, RTÉ
- Muiris MacConghail, RTÉ
- Cathal Goan, RTÉ

Scottish Chairs:

- Donald Waters, Grampian Television
- Neil Fraser, BBC Scotland
- Maggie Cunningham, BBC Scotland
- Domhnall Caimbeul, MG ALBA

Welsh Chairs:

- Huw Jones, S4C
- John Hefin, Wales Film Council
- Owen Edwards, S4C

== Festival Locations ==
- 2026 - Belfast
- 2025 - Newquay, Cornwall
- 2024 - Cardiff, Wales
- 2023 - Dungloe, Donegal, Ireland
- 2022 - Quimper, Brittany
- 2021 - Online
- 2020 - Online
- 2019 - Aviemore, Scotland
- 2018 - Llanelli, Wales
- 2017 - Douglas, Isle of Man
- 2016 - Dungarvan, Ireland
- 2015 - Inverness, Scotland
- 2014 - St Ives, Cornwall
- 2013 - Swansea, Wales
- 2012 - Derry, Northern Ireland
- 2011 - Stornoway, Scotland
- 2010 - Newry, Northern Ireland
- 2009 - Caernarfon, Wales
- 2008 - Galway, Ireland
- 2007 - Skye, Scotland
- 2006 - Falmouth, Cornwall
- 2005 - Cardiff, Wales
- 2004 - Dundee, Scotland
- 2003 - Belfast, Northern Ireland
- 2002 - Quimper, Brittany
- 2001 - Truro, Cornwall
- 2000 - Aberystwyth, Wales
- 1999 - Skye, Scotland
- 1998 - Tralee, Ireland
- 1997 - St Ives, Cornwall
- 1996 - Bangor, Wales
- 1995 - Fort William, Scotland
- 1994 - Derry, Northern Ireland
- 1993 - Lorient, Brittany
- 1992 - Carmarthen, Wales
- 1991 - Inverness, Scotland
- 1990 - Gweedore, Ireland
- 1989 - Roscoff, Brittany
- 1988 - Caernarfon, Gwynedd, Wales
- 1987 - Inverness, Scotland
- 1986 - Newcastle, Northern Ireland
- 1985 - Douarnenez and Rennes, Brittany
- 1984 - Cardiff, Wales
- 1983 - Glasgow, Scotland
- 1982 - Wexford, Ireland
- 1981 - Harlech, Wales
- 1980 - Benbecula, Scotland

== Categories ==
- Documentary / Factual : Factual Series - Factual Entertainment - Single Documentary - History - Sport - Arts - Current Affairs - Feature Documentary
- Drama : Short Drama - Single Drama - Drama Series
- Further Screen Categories : Comedy - Animation - Children - Entertainment - Short Form - Live Music Programme
- Sound : Radio Station of the Year - Documentary - History - Drama - Music Programme - Sports - Presenter of the Year - Comedy - Entertainment

== See also ==
- List of Celtic-language media
- List of television festivals
