= France 3 Bretagne =

Coordinates: 48°06′30″N 1°40′24″W

- Logo used since 2018
- Country: France
- Broadcast area: Brittany
- Headquarters: Rennes

Ownership
- Owner: France Télévisions

History
- Launched: 2 February 1964; 61 years ago
- Former names: RTF Télé-Bretagne (1964); ORTF Télé-Bretagne (1964–1975); FR3 Bretagne Pays-de-Loire (1975–1992); France 3 Ouest (1992–2010)

Links
- Website: bretagne.france3.fr

France 3 Bretagne is one of France 3's regional services, broadcasting to people in the administrative region of Brittany. It was founded on 2 February 1964 as RTF Télé-Bretagne.

France 3 broadcasts mainly in French and also in Breton. The service is headquartered in Rennes.

== Current programs ==
- Ici 19/20 Iroise
- L'enquête Ouest
- Ici 19/20 Maine
- Mouchig-Dall
- xMidi sports
- Bali Breizh

== Former programs ==
- C'est mieux le matin
- Digor Din
- Son da zont
- Red An Amzer
- Te ha Me

== Presenters ==
- Jean-Pierre Lyvinec
- Sylvie Denis
- Yves-Herle Gourves
- Virginie Charbonneau
- Sébastien Thomas
- Bernez Quillien
- and more
