= MG Alba =

UK body to fund Gaelic broadcasting

MG ALBA
- Seirbheis nam Meadhanan Gàidhlig
- Formation: 2003
- Type: Statutory organisation
- Headquarters: Stornoway, Isle of Lewis, Scotland
- Region served: Scotland
- Services: BBC Alba (in partnership with the BBC), LearnGaelic, SpeakGaelic, FilmG
- Official language: Scottish Gaelic
- Chairperson: John Morrison
- Key people: Donald Campbell (Chief Executive)
- Revenue: £14.8 million (2025)
- Website: www.mgalba.com

The Gaelic Media Service (Scottish Gaelic: Seirbheis nam Meadhanan Gàidhlig), operating as MG ALBA, is a statutory organisation created by the UK Parliament and funded by Scottish Ministers via Ofcom as a result of the Communications Act 2003, which gave it a remit to "secure that a wide and diverse range of high quality programmes in Gaelic are broadcast or otherwise transmitted so as to be available to persons in Scotland". To accomplish this, the organisation's founding mandate includes provisions to fund Gaelic programme production and development, provide Gaelic broadcasting training, and conduct audience research, with later amendments conferring the authority to schedule and commission programmes and seek a broadcast licence.

From its offices in Stornoway and Glasgow the organisation produces Gaelic-language programmes for broadcast on platforms including BBC Alba, a Gaelic-language free-to-air public broadcast television channel it has operated in partnership with the BBC since 19 September 2008. The organisation's talent development initiatives include FilmG, a Gaelic short film competition whose winners are given opportunity to develop their programme ideas to broadcast standard.

== See also ==
- BBC Alba
- BBC Scotland
- STV (TV channel)
- FilmG
