= BBC Alba =

Scottish Gaelic language TV channel

- Logo used since 2021
- Country: United Kingdom
- Broadcast area: Scotland (Note: Scotland only on Freeview, available via satellite, cable and BBC iPlayer for rest of the UK)
- Headquarters: Pacific Quay (Glasgow) and Stornoway

Programming
- Language: Scottish Gaelic (Note: English-language audio and subtitles available on some programmes)
- Picture format: 1080i HDTV (Note: HDTV on Virgin Media only.) (downscaled to 576i for the SDTV feed)

Ownership
- Owner: BBC and MG Alba
- Sister channels: BBC One (in Scotland); BBC Scotland; BBC Two; BBC Three; BBC Four; BBC News; BBC Parliament; CBBC; CBeebies

History
- Launched: 19 September 2008; 18 years ago

Links
- Website: Official website

Availability

Terrestrial
- Freeview (Scotland only): Channel 7 (SD)

Streaming media
- BBC iPlayer: Watch live (UK only)
- TVPlayer: Watch live (UK only)

BBC Alba is a Scottish Gaelic-language free-to-air public broadcast television channel jointly owned by the BBC and MG Alba. The channel was launched on 19 September 2008 and is on-air for up to seven hours a day. The name Alba is the Scottish Gaelic name for Scotland. The station is unique in that it is the first channel to be delivered under a BBC licence by a partnership and was also the first multi-genre channel to come entirely from Scotland with almost all of its programmes made in Scotland.

As of 2012, BBC Alba had an average viewership of 637,000 adults over the age of 16 in Scotland each week.

== History ==
Logo used from 2008 to 2021

In 2007, the BBC Trust opened a consultation for a Gaelic digital service in partnership with the Gaelic Media Service. Following the BBC Trust consultation in November 2007, the Audience Council Scotland recommended their support for the creation of the service on 7 December 2007, stating that the Trust should pursue carriage of the service on digital terrestrial television and that the existing "Gaelic zone" programming on BBC Scotland should remain after the launch. On 28 January 2008, the BBC Trust gave the go-ahead for a Gaelic channel.

The channel began broadcasting on satellite at 9:00 pm on 19 September 2008 with a launch video featuring a new rendition of the Runrig song, Alba. The first part of a live cèilidh from Skye, presented by Mary Ann Kennedy, was followed by a specially produced comedy-drama entitled Eilbheas (Elvis), starring Greg Hemphill as Elvis Presley, at 9:30 pm. The channel's first independent commission, Peter Manuel – Deireadh an Uilc? (Peter Manuel - The End of Evil?), a drama-documentary produced by STV Productions, was shown at 10:30 pm before the opening night closed with the second half of the live cèilidh from Skye. The launch night was simulcast on BBC Two Scotland between 9:00 pm and 10:30 pm and a launch event was held at the National Museum of Scotland, which was recorded by the channel's news service An Là.

A study carried out for the channel indicated that 650,000 people watched BBC Alba per week in the first two months of broadcasting, in spite of only being available to around a third of Scots. After being subject to a review by the BBC Trust and a recommendation from the Audience Council Scotland in 2009, a plan was announced to broadcast the channel on Freeview, in Scotland only, from the digital switchover (2010) under the proviso that reach of the service extended beyond the core Gaelic audience to 250,000. This was approved by the BBC Trust on 27 December 2010 and the service launched on Freeview on 8 June 2011. The channel also launched on Virgin Media (Scotland only) on 18 May 2011, and was made available nationwide on the Virgin Media and Sky platforms, the former on 6 November 2012.

== Operation ==
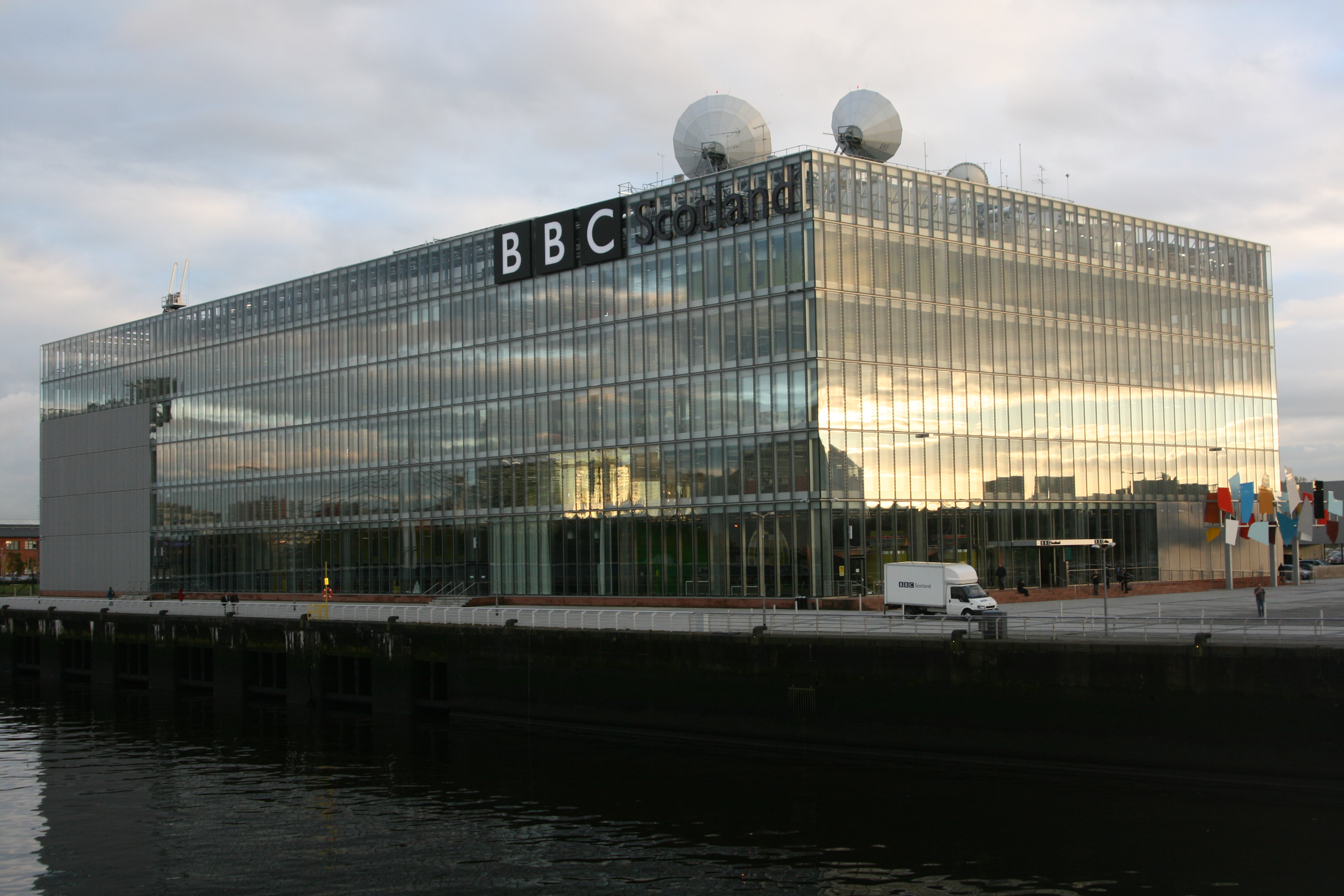
Pacific Quay in Glasgow, from where BBC Alba is transmitted.

BBC Alba is broadcast for up to seven hours a day in the United Kingdom on satellite platforms Sky and Freesat, cable provider Virgin Media and on digital terrestrial provider Freeview in Scotland only. BBC Alba simulcasts the BBC's Gaelic-language radio service BBC Radio nan Gàidheal as well during the day after midnight (1am on Saturday night), which in turn simulcasts BBC Radio Scotland overnight. Programmes are also available to watch on the Internet live through services including the BBC iPlayer and some programmes are available for 30 days (or more) after broadcast on this service and on catch-up services of some other services. Unlike BBC Three and BBC Four, BBC Alba is an evenings-only channel that does not start broadcasting until 7 pm and does not timeshare with other channels, except on Freeview, where Radio 1, Radio 2, Radio 3, Radio nan Gàidheal and World Service all go off air in Scotland on Freeview whenever BBC Alba is broadcasting. On 8 September 2022, BBC Alba had to pause programming at around 6:30pm due to the death of Queen Elizabeth II. Normal programming resumed the following day at 7pm.

The channel is financed from the BBC Scotland budget and by MG Alba, which itself is financed by the Scottish Government and the UK government. In 2011/12 the BBC spent £8 million on the channel, of which £5 million was used for programming. MG Alba spends the majority of its budget (£12.4 million in 2008/09) on the Gaelic Digital Service.

BBC Alba continuity presentation and channel management is based in Stornoway, while the news services are based in Inverness. BBC Scotland's headquarters at Pacific Quay in Glasgow is used to transmit the programmes.

The BBC have confirmed that BBC Alba HD will launch online and on various platforms between October 2021 and the end of 2022.

== Content ==
BBC Alba combines television, radio and on-line programme content. BBC Alba broadcasts more Scottish sport than any other channel, with over three hours a week of football, rugby and shinty. In addition, the station also broadcasts a live news programme every day, with the weekend news provision beginning in 2018.

=== Programming ===
Output on the channel consists of news, current affairs, sport, drama, documentary, entertainment, education, religion and children's programming, broadcast on most days between 5 pm and midnight.

Children's programmes are shown for two hours every weekday, between 17:00 and 19:00. Starting in 2018, a rebranding initiative saw the first hour presented as 'CBeebies Alba' and the second hour as 'CBBC Alba'. They are the Scottish Gaelic versions of the CBBC and CBeebies channels.

=== Subtitling ===
Most of the adult programming on BBC Alba contains on-screen English subtitles. For logistical reasons, live broadcasts (including the news) are not subtitled, although certain events (e.g. the annual Hogmanay broadcast Bliadhna Mhath Ùr) have scripted elements that are subtitled, while interviews and ad-libbed lines are not.

Children's programmes are not subtitled. Controversially, no English dialogue on the channel is subtitled into Scottish Gaelic.

=== Sport ===
BBC Alba concentrates on four sports: football, rugby, shinty, and curling.

During the 2009–10 season, the station broadcast one full Scottish Premier League game every Saturday night. The game selected was always one not covered by either live Sky Sports or on an on-demand basis by BT Vision and was shown three hours after the end of the match. The matches only included Gaelic commentary along with English subtitles.The channel reached an agreement with the Scottish Football League to broadcast live football games during the 2008–09 season. This began with the final of the Challenge Cup, which was also sponsored by MG Alba. BBC Alba then started broadcasting First Division games, beginning with the match between Airdrie United and Clyde on 22 February 2009.

BBC Alba also struck a deal with the Scottish rugby authorities to show one live Scottish Premiership Division One match every weekend.

For the 2015–16 season, BBC Alba will show 20 live matches (excluding Rangers) from either the 2015-16 Scottish Championship (including the play-off final), League 1 or League 2, as well as four matches from the Scottish Challenge Cup. The station also altered their coverage of Scottish Premiership highlights, showing one-hour highlights of two non-televised matches on a Saturday and Sunday night at 22:00. Other football coverage includes all Scotland U21s and Women's matches, as well as the final of the 2015-16 Scottish Junior Cup.

In 2010 BBC Alba bought the rights for Celtic League rugby jointly with public service broadcasters from the Republic of Ireland, Northern Ireland and Wales.

In May 2020, BBC Alba broadcast the last five matches of Women's Bundesliga.

=== Independent production companies ===
A number of independent companies have been commissioned to produce content for the channel, or have productions currently airing. These include:

- Theatre Hebrides (Lostbost)
- Madmac Productions (Broadford or Bust)
- Caledonia Stern and Wylde (Tìr is Teanga)
- MnE Media, formerly known as Meadhan nan Eilean (Seasaidh Lexy, Cuide ri Cathy)
- Tern TV (Slighe gu Biadh)
- Eyeline Media (Air an Rathad, Làrach anns an Fhàsach)
- MacTV (Ealtainn)
- Studio Alba (A' Gharaids)
- Young Films (Bannan)

== Criticism ==
=== English content and lack of Gaelic subtitles ===
The Gaelic community, including writers Aonghas MacNeacail, Angus Peter Campbell, Lisa Storey and musician Allan MacDonald, have criticised the non-availability of Gaelic subtitles, and the emphasis on English-language interviews and reportage in the channel's content for adults. Writers and authors were reported by the BBC Gaelic news service as setting up a campaign, GAIDHLIG.TV, to increase Gaelic content on BBC Alba. The decision to introduce 'red button facilities' to allow viewers to switch to English-language sports commentary, first announced in August 2014 for rugby and the Guinness Pro12 series, was heavily criticised by the Gaelic community. The criticism resulted in MG Alba announcing publicly in the West Highland Free Press that the 'red button option' for English-language commentary would not expand to other sports or areas of the channel.

=== Sports programming ===
Between its launch in September 2008 and the beginning of 2010, the BBC Alba channel lost a third of its viewers, but its number of viewers remains five times larger than the size of the Gaelic speech community in Scotland (just over 58,000). The historian Michael Fry has argued that many of its viewers only watch it for the football coverage, because "you don't need Gaelic to watch football", and that in this way the channel is "cheating". The model is, however, both common and intentional as it is on comparable channels such as the Irish language channel TG4, the Basque broadcaster EITB or the Welsh channel S4C. In Europe, these channels' main mission is not commercial, but the promotion of the original languages.

=== Freeview ===
Some criticism had been levied over the channel's addition to Freeview, primarily due to the BBC's original plan (with acceptance from the BBC Executive) to remove all 13 BBC Radio channels from Freeview for Scottish viewers over the period that BBC Alba will be shown on Freeview (between 5 pm and midnight); however the criticism has not been directed at the BBC's decision to extend BBC ALBA to Freeview in principle. On 19 May 2011, it was reported that the BBC has backed down on the plans, after the BBC had "managed to reengineer facilities" to allow BBC Radio 1Xtra, 5 Live and 6 Music to continue to broadcast on a 24-hour basis. The three stations were chosen because they have the highest evening audience ratings on digital television of the seven BBC radio stations unavailable on FM radio. On 2 December 2013, it was confirmed that more radio stations were made available 24 hours in Scotland, but with some trade-offs. BBC Radio 4, 4 Extra, 5 Sports Extra, Radio Scotland and Asian Network were restored, but as noted in the blog with some technical trade-offs, such as mono audio rather than stereo during the evenings on the radio stations mentioned and the audio bit rate of the TV channels in Scotland on Freeview reduced to 192 kbit/s from 256 kbit/s.

== See also ==
- Bòrd na Gàidhlig
- List of Celtic-language media
- Celtic Media Festival
- TeleG – Gaelic-language channel, previously available on Freeview, that was closed at digital switchover.
- Whakaata Māori (Māori Television)
- NRK Sámi Radio
- France 3 Bretagne
