= List of Gaelic medium schools in Scotland =

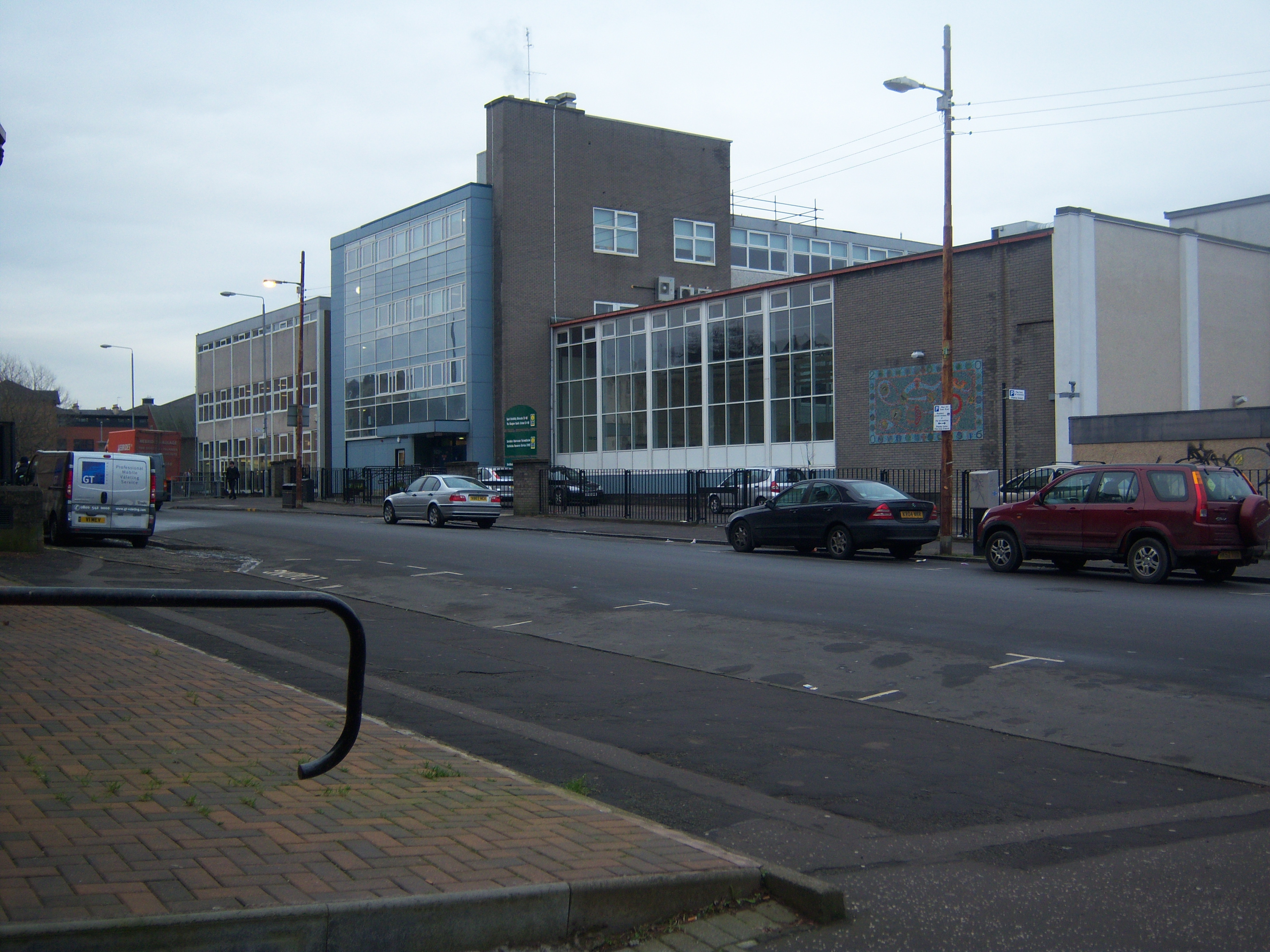
Sgoil Ghàidhlig Ghlaschu, or Glasgow Gaelic School, is the largest provider of Gaelic-medium education in Scotland in terms of pupils

This is a list of schools and institutions providing Scottish Gaelic–medium education (GME) by area. For convenience the areas listed are not necessarily council or education authority areas unless otherwise noted. There are at least 46 nurseries, 62 primary schools and 29 secondary schools providing GME education in Scotland.

== Aberdeen City ==
=== Primary schools ===
- Gilcomstoun Primary School – Provides nursery and primary school GME.

=== Secondary schools ===
- Hazlehead Academy – only provides education in the subject of Gaelic, not Gaelic-medium education in other subjects

== Angus ==
- Whitehills Primary School, Forfar

== Argyll and Bute ==
=== Primary schools ===
- Bowmore Primary School, Islay
- Tiree Primary School, Tiree
- Salen Primary School, Mull
- Rockfield Primary School, Oban
- Strath of Appin Primary School, by Oban
- Sandbank Primary School, Dunoon
- Bunessan Primary - Isle of Mull

=== Secondary schools ===
- Tiree Secondary School
- Tobermory High School, Mull
- Oban High School, Oban

== Ayrshire ==
=== Primary schools ===
- Sgoil na Coille Nuaidh, Kilmarnock – provides early learning and childcare, primary and secondary education for pupils aged 2–18 across East Ayrshire.
- Bun-Sgoil Pàirc Whitehirst, Kilwinning – provides GME primary education for pupils aged 5–11 across North Ayrshire. The school opened in August 2020.

=== Secondary schools ===
Kilmarnock Academy, Kilmarnock – provides early learning and childcare, primary and secondary education for pupils aged 2–18 across East Ayrshire.

== Clackmannanshire ==
No Gaelic-medium education exists in Clackmannanshire at present.

== Comhairle nan Eilean Siar (Western Isles Council) ==
Gaelic-medium education is available in most, if not all schools in the Western Isles. There are currently 20 pre-schools, 18 primary schools and 4 secondary schools offering Gaelic-medium education.

== East Dunbartonshire ==
- Meadowburn Primary School

Bishopbriggs Academy – only provides education in the subject of Gaelic, not Gaelic-medium education in other subjects

== East Renfrewshire ==
Bun-Sgoil Ghàidhlig Thornliebank - Offers GME at Primary Level as of August 2023

== Edinburgh and Lothians ==
- Bun-sgoil Taobh na Pàirce
- James Gillespie's High School

Pupils from Midlothian, East Lothian, and West Lothian are transported by the council to the schools in Edinburgh.

== Falkirk ==
No Gaelic-medium education exists in Falkirk at present. Falkirk children attend the GME schools in North Lanarkshire and Stirling in transport provided by Falkirk Council.

== Glasgow City ==
- Sgoil Ghàidhlig Ghlaschu – provides primary and secondary education.
- Bunsgoil Ghàidhlig Ghleann Dail
- Bun-sgoil Ghàidhlig Baile Ghobhainn – provides GME primary education.
- Bun-sgoil Ghàidhlig a’ Challtainn – provides GME primary education in North East Glasgow.

== Highland ==
In the Highland council area there are 21 nurseries, 21 primary schools and 13 secondary schools educating 1294 pupils in Gaelic.

=== School areas with primaries providing GME ===
- Acharacle, Lochaber
- Bonar Bridge, Sutherland
- Broadford, Isle of Skye
- Bun-sgoil Ghàidhlig Inbhir Nis
- Craighill, Tain
- Dingwall, Ross-shire
- Dunvegan, Isle of Skye
- Fort William, Lochaber
- Gairloch, Wester Ross
- Glenurquhart
- Kilmuir, Isle of Skye
- Lochcarron
- Mallaig, Lochaber
- Millbank, Nairn
- Newtonmore
- Plockton
- Portree, Isle of Skye
- Sleat, Isle of Skye
- Staffin, Isle of Skye
- Mount Pleasant, Thurso, Caithness
- Tongue, Sutherland
- Ullapool

=== Secondary schools ===
- Alness Academy
- Ardnamurchan High
- Charleston Academy
- Culloden Academy
- Dingwall Academy
- Farr High
- Gairloch High School
- Glenurquhart High School
- Inverness Royal Academy
- Lochaber High School
- Mallaig High School
- Millburn Academy
- Nairn Academy
- Plockton High School
- Portree High School
- Thurso High School
- Ullapool High
- Tain Royal Academy

== Inverclyde ==
- Whinhill Primary School (Bun-sgoil Chnoc a' Chonaisg), Greenock. (Includes Gaelic pre-school provision)

== North Lanarkshire ==
- Condorrat Primary School (Bunsgoil Chondobhrait), Cumbernauld provides Primary GME. The unit had roll of 166 in 2012/13
- Greenfaulds High School, Cumbernauld provides Secondary GME.

== Perth & Kinross ==
- Goodlyburn Primary School, Perth. Provides Primary GME.
- Perth Academy, Perth.
- Breadalbane Academy, Aberfeldy. Provides Primary GME.

== Renfrewshire ==
West Primary School, Paisley.

== Scottish Borders ==
No Gaelic-medium education exists in the Scottish Borders at present.

== South Lanarkshire ==
- Mount Cameron Primary School (with nursery)
- Calderglen High School

== Stirling ==
- Riverside Primary School, Stirling, provides Primary GME.
- Wallace High School, Stirling, provides Secondary GME.

== West Lothian ==
No Gaelic-medium education exists in West Lothian at present.

== See also ==
- Scottish Gaelic–medium education
- Gaelscoil for Irish Gaelic–medium education in Ireland.
