= Bun-sgoil Ghàidhlig Phort Righ =

Coordinates: 57°24′48″N 6°12′41″W

Location
- Struan Road; Portree, IV51 9EG; Scotland

Information
- Type: Primary
- Established: April 2018
- Local authority: Highland
- Headteacher: Flora Guidi
- Gender: All genders
- Age: 4 to 12
- Enrolment: 123
- Language: Scottish Gaelic

Bun-sgoil Ghàidhlig Phort Righ is a Gaelic-medium all-gender primary school in Portree on Skye, Scotland. The school opened April 2018, becoming the third purpose-built Gaelic school in the Highland Council area. The £8.7 million building was built by Robertson Construction. The School had 169 pupils as of January 2026. The current Headteacher is Flora Guidi.

One local councillor criticised the new school as a "disaster for community relations" as pupils in a small community should not be divided by language.

== Catchment ==
The school’s catchment has a variety of villages across the island including Edinbane, Uig, Staffin, Carbost, Dunvegan and many more across northern Skye.

== See also ==
- Bun-sgoil Ghàidhlig Inbhir Nis
- Bun-sgoil Taobh na Pàirce
