= Bun-sgoil Ghàidhlig Loch Abar =

Coordinates: 56.84115°N 5.09635°W

Location
- Ardour Road; Caol; Fort William, PH33 7JE; Scotland

Information
- Type: Primary
- Established: August 2015
- Local authority: Highland
- Enrolment: 70 (2016)
- Language: Gaelic
- Website: www.bsgla.co.uk

Bun-sgoil Ghàidhlig Loch Abar is a Gaelic-medium primary school at Caol near Fort William in Scotland.

== History ==
The school opened August 2015. At the time of opening, the school was arranged into four classrooms and nursery facilities, although the buildings were designed to allow expansion. It is the second purpose-built Gaelic school in the Highlands.

The £6.1 million building was built by Robertson Construction and had a formal opening ceremony in March 2016, attended by Alasdair Allan MSP, the Scottish Government's Minister for International Development and Europe.

Before the school opened, Gaelic was taught in a unit in the RC Primary School Fort William. As of March 2016, the school has 70 primary pupils and 15 children in the nursery. The head teacher is John Joe MacNeil.

The school buildings have been used for other Gaelic cultural activities events; in June 2016 it hosted the national "Cuach na Cloinne" competition and events as part of the Lochaber Provincial Mòd.

In November 2016, the school was recommended for the 'Best New Building' category at the Inverness Architectural Association (IAA) design awards.

== See also ==
- Bun-sgoil Ghàidhlig Inbhir Nis
