= List of Celtic choirs =

This is a list of choirs that sing at least part of their repertoire in a Celtic language. Celtic choirs keep alive Celtic music traditions and language, bringing them to a wider audience and reinforcing the learning of Celtic languages. Choirs compete at Celtic festivals such as the National Mod in Scotland and Welsh Eisteddfod. The London Welsh Male Voice Choir and the London Welsh Rugby Club Choir sang the Olympic Anthem at the closing ceremony of the 2012 London Olympics. For choirs in the UK, please see the separate entries for each country.

The choirs sing in Breton (Brezhoneg), Cornish (Kernewek), Irish (Gaeilge), Manx Gaelic (Gaelg), Scottish Gaelic (Gàidhlig) or Welsh (Cymraeg).

== Celtic choirs by country ==
=== Argentina ===
- Ceolraidh, the only choir in Latin America devoted to singing, promoting and keeping Scottish Gaelic language and music traditions alive
- Tirn Aill, chamber vocal group of Celtic music and ethnic music – (Buenos Aires)

=== Australia ===
- Australian Celtic Singers in Newcastle, New South Wales – all Celtic languages
- Australian Gaelic Singers / Còisir Ghàidhlig Astràilianach in Sydney, New South Wales – (Scottish Gaelic)
- Còisir Ghàidhlig Bhioctoria (Scottish Gaelic Choir of Victoria) in Melbourne, Victoria – (Scottish Gaelic)
- Melbourne Welsh Male Choir in Melbourne, Victoria – (Welsh)
- Australian Welsh Male Choir / Côr Meibion Cymreig Australia in Frankston, Victoria – (Welsh)
- Victoria Welsh Male Choir / Cantorion Cymreig in Melbourne, Victoria and Bendigo, Victoria – (Welsh)
- Cantorion Sydney Choir in Sydney, New South Wales – (Welsh)
- Celtic Connection Choir in Brisbane, Queensland – all Celtic languages
- Sydney Welsh Choir in Sydney, New South Wales – (Welsh)

=== Brittany ===
- Ensemble Choral du Bout du Monde – (Breton)
- Chœur Homme Bretagne – (Breton)

=== Canada ===
- Guth Nan Eilean, The Victoria Scottish Gaelic Choir, Victoria, British Columbia
- Vancouver Gaelic Choir in Vancouver, British Columbia – (Scottish Gaelic)
- Toronto Welsh Male Voice Choir in Greater Toronto Area, Toronto Ontario – Croeso! (Welcome)
- Burlington Welsh Male Chorus, Burlington Ontario Canada
- Mouth Music/Musique à Bouche, Celtic Choir, Montreal, Qc

=== Cornwall ===
- St Mary's Singers of Truro Cathedral in Truro Cathedral, Truro – (Cornish)

=== England (except Cornwall) ===
- Còisir Lunnain – London Gaelic Choir – (Scottish Gaelic)
- Côr Meibion Cymry Llundain – London Welsh Male Voice Choir – (Welsh)
- Gaelic Voices Choir – London – (Irish Gaelic)
- Gwalia Male Voice Choir in London – (Welsh)
- London Welsh Male Voice Choir – (Welsh)
- London Welsh Rugby Club Choir – (Welsh)
- Oxford Welsh Male Voice Choir – (Welsh)
- Rushmoor Male Voice Choir in Surrey/Hants – (Welsh)

=== France ===
See Brittany

=== Ireland ===
- Anúna Celtic Choir – (Irish Gaelic)

=== Isle of Man ===
- Caarjyn Cooidjagh – (Manx Gaelic) CD releases Cronnane (1999) Carval Chreneash (2004) Skellyn (2008)
- Cliogaree Twoaie – (Manx Gaelic) 'Northern Croakers' CD releases Drogh Vraane and a few good men (2005) and Nollick Ghennal (2006)

=== Scotland ===
- Còisir Dhùn Èideann (Edinburgh Gaelic Choir – (Scottish Gaelic)
- Còisir Gàidhlig Nàiseanta (in English: National Gaelic Choir)
- Coisir Ghaidhlig an Eilein Mhuilich, the Isle of Mull Gaelic Choir – (Scottish Gaelic)
- Còisir Sgir a' Bhac
- Còisir Sgire Phortrigh – Portree
- Dingwall Gaelic Choir – Dingwall
- Govan Gaelic Choir – Govan, Lanarkshire
- Inverness Gaelic Choir
- Lothian Gaelic Choir
- Strath Gaelic Choir
- Taynuilt Gaelic Choir – Taynuilt

=== South Africa ===
- Welsh Male Voice Choir of South Africa – (Welsh)

=== United States ===
- Choir of Southern California Côr Cymraeg De Califfornia in Southern California – (Welsh)

=== Wales ===
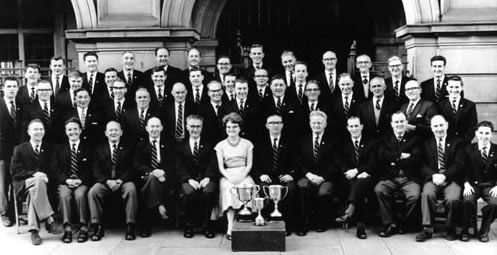
Llanharan "Semi National" Eisteddfod Côr Meibion Pontypridd awarded First place

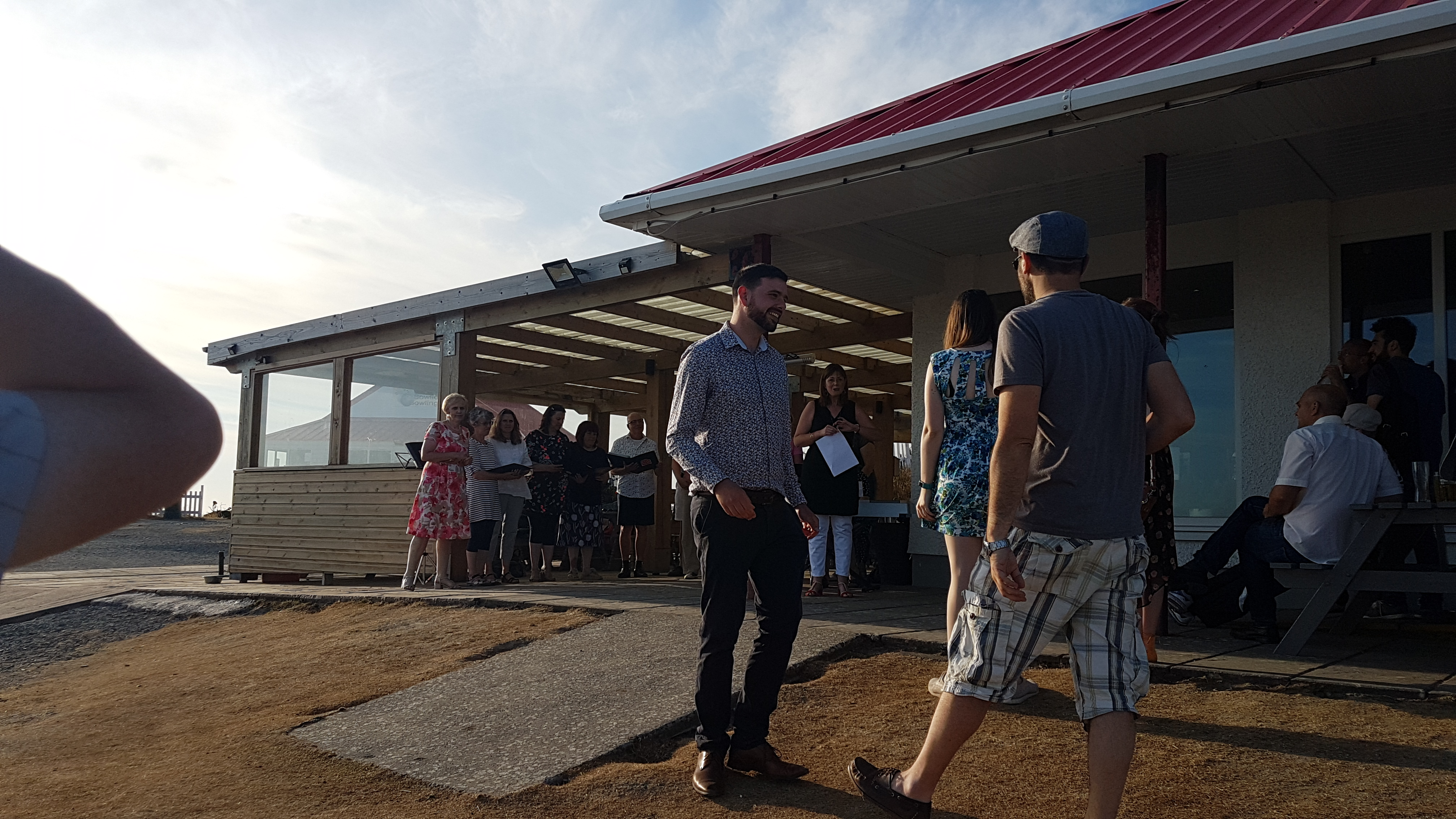
The National Library of Wales choir at Celtic Knot Conference 2018

- Barry, Vale of Glamorgan Barry Male Voice Choir
- Côr Dathlu Cwmtawe
- Côr Godre'r Aran, Llanuwchllyn
- Côr Meibion Dowlais
- Côr Meibion Froncysyllte Male Voice Choir
- CF1 mixed voice choir
- Côr Meibion Llanelli
- Côr Meibion Pontypridd
- Cwmbach Male Choir
- Cytgan
- Gwalia Singers
- Hogia'r Ddwylan – Anglesey
- Morriston Orpheus Choir – Morriston Orpheus Choir – (Welsh)
- Pontarddulais Male Choir
- Treorchy Male Choir
