= Bun-sgoil Ghàidhlig Inbhir Nis =

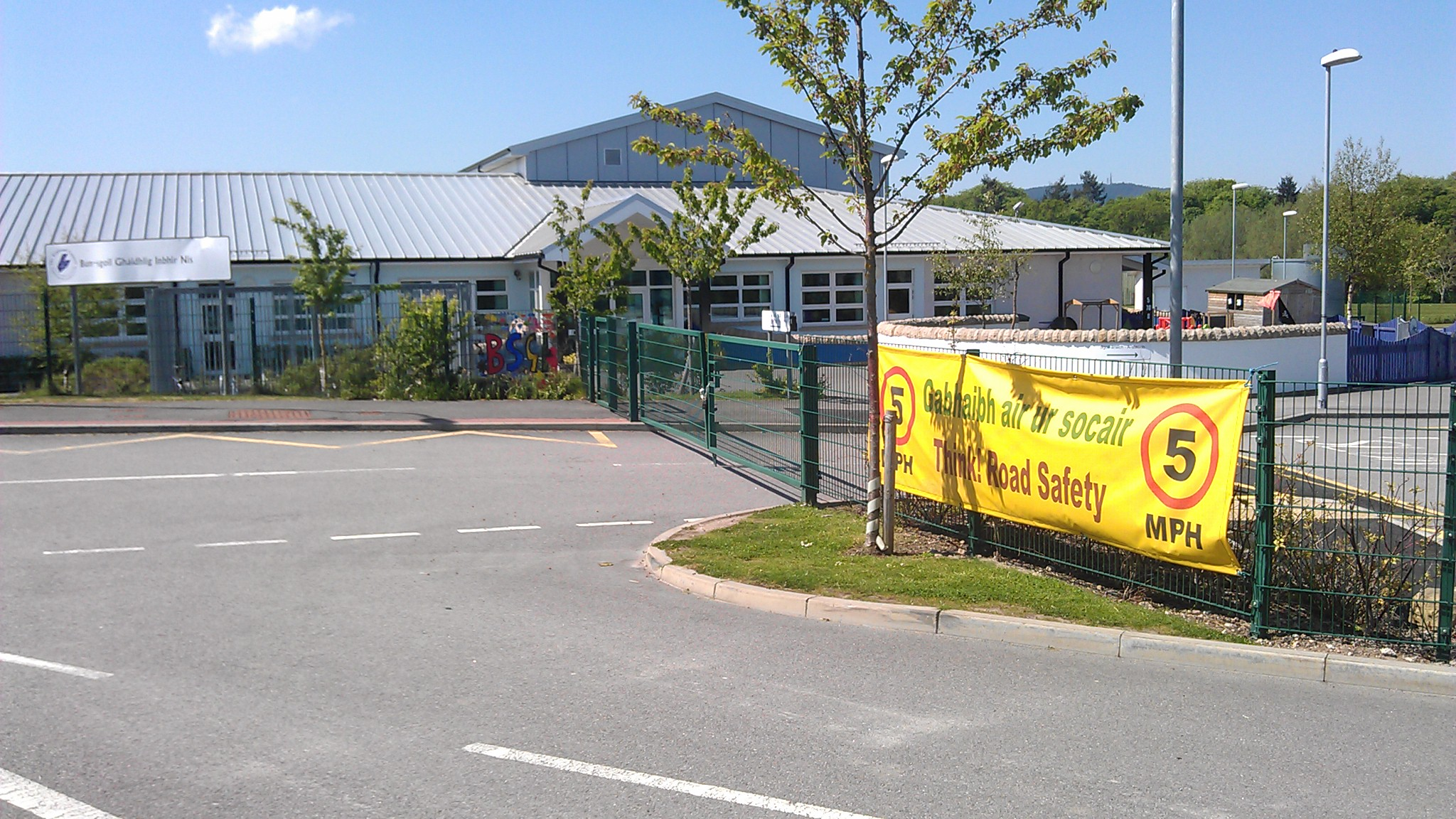

Location
- Slackbuie; Inverness, IV2 6BA; Scotland
- Coordinates: 57.45056°N 4.21978°W

Information
- Type: Primary
- Motto: an t-ionnsachadh òg an t-ionnsachadh bòidheach
- Established: August 2007
- Local authority: Highland
- Enrollment: 222 (2025)
- Language: Gaelic
- Website: https://bunsgoilghaidhliginbhirnis.wordpress.com/

Bun-sgoil Ghàidhlig Inbhir Nis or Inverness Gaelic Primary School is a primary school in Inverness, Scotland, which teaches through the medium of Scottish Gaelic, commonly known as Gaelic medium education. It opened in August 2007, as the first purpose-built Gaelic-medium school in Scotland.

== History ==
The school was the first purpose-built Gaelic-medium school in Scotland, and opened in August 2007 with 100 pupils and 45 nursery places. By 2013 the roll had increased to 160 primary school pupils and nearly 100 nursery pupils. An annex was proposed to accommodate pre-school children and pupils in the first two years of primary school. After a four-year search, a head teacher was recruited, with some opinions expressed around whether the head needed to be a fluent Gaelic speaker. In May 2015, a head teacher was appointed who had previously won a gold medal at the Royal National Mòd.

An annexe was completed in February 2020. As of September 2021 the school has twelve classrooms, with a pupil roll of 223. In August 2010, two classrooms were added and the primary roll was 137 plus 60 in pre-school.

In 2009, the Care Commission praised levels of care for pre-school children attending the school, awarding it "very good" and "excellent" grades.

== See also ==
- Gaelic medium education in Scotland
- Gaelscoileanna for Irish-gaelic medium education in Ireland.
- Bun-sgoil Taobh na Pàirce
- Sgoil Ghàidhlig Ghlaschu
