= Nova Scotia Gaelic Mod =

Folk festival

Nova Scotia Gaelic Mòd is an annual folk festival, held every August in the Cape Breton Island region of Nova Scotia, Canada. It features many traditional Scottish games, dances, costumes, and food specialties. The whole of eastern Nova Scotia turns up for Sword Dances, pipe bands, athleticevents, and general celebration of the origins of many early settlers in the Gàidhealtachd of Scotland, the continued speaking of Canadian Gaelic, and the influence of Highland Scottish culture in the province.

Ferries are available from Bar Harbor, Maine to Halifax, Nova Scotia regularly during the summer months.

== In popular culture ==
- 1955 The Mòd at Grand Pré: A Nova Scotian Light Opera in Two Acts, Libretto by Watson Kirkconnell, music by E.A. Collins. Wolfville, Nova Scotia.
