= Scottish Gaelic-medium education =

Education delivered in Scottish Gaelic

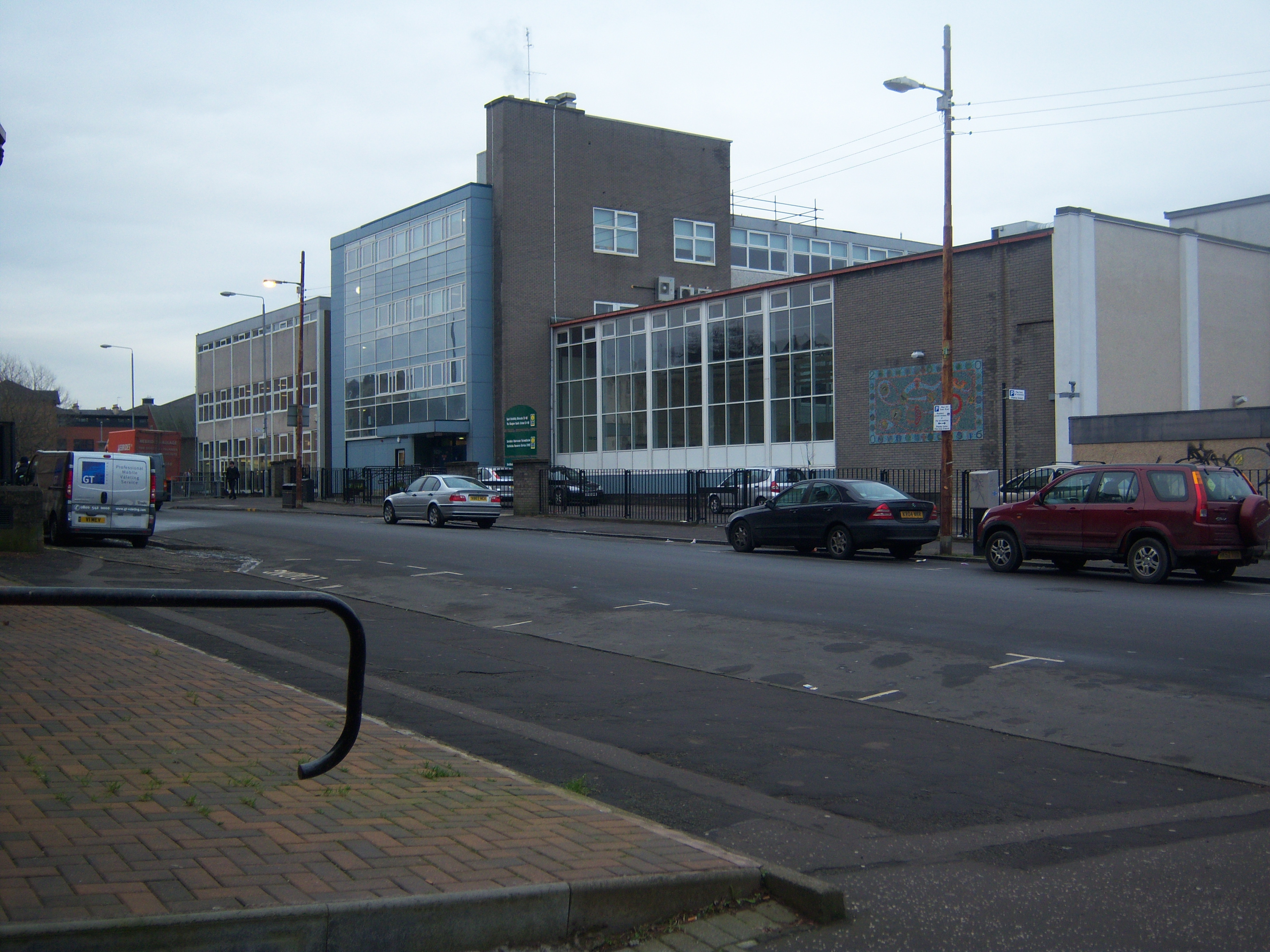
Sgoil Ghàidhlig Ghlaschu, or Glasgow Gaelic School, is the largest provider of Gaelic-medium education in Scotland in terms of pupils

Scottish Gaelic-medium education (Scottish Gaelic: Foghlam tro Mheadhan na Gàidhlig; FtMG), also known as Gaelic-medium education (GME), is a form of education in Scotland that allows pupils to be taught primarily through the medium of Scottish Gaelic, with English being taught as the secondary language.

Gaelic-medium education is increasingly popular throughout Scotland, and the number of pupils who are in Gaelic-medium education has risen from 24 in 1985 (its first year) to 5,066 in 2021. As of 2017, the current figure is the highest number of Gaelic-medium education pupils in Scotland since the 2005 passage of the Gaelic Language (Scotland) Act by the Scottish Parliament. Not included in this figure are university students at Sabhal Mòr Ostaig, Lews Castle College, or Ionad Chaluim Chille Ìle who are taking their degrees through the medium of Gaelic.

== Current provision ==
In 2021, 11,874 pupils in Scotland were receiving some kind of education in Gaelic representing 1.7% of the country's student population. This figure is higher than Scotland's overall proportion of Gaelic speakers which stood at 1.1% in 2011.

Nearly 5,100 students in Scotland were enrolled in Gaelic-medium education in 2021, a 92% increase over 2009 figures.

		Number of Pupils	Per 1000 pupils at that level
Gaelic-medium education	Secondary pupils	1,258	4.1
Gaelic-medium education	Primary pupils	3,808	9.8
Gaelic-medium education	ALL PUPILS	5,066	7.2

Fifteen of Scotland's thirty-two council areas offer Gaelic-medium education. Five of those fifteen have a higher than national average enrollment of students: Eilean Siar (39.1%); Highland (4.5%); Argyll & Bute (2.2%); Glasgow City (1.8%); and Edinburgh City (0.9%). The Comhairle nan Eilean Siar announced in 2020 that Gaelic-medium would become the default for primary-school entrants in the Outer Hebrides from August., and in 2021, 43% of primary school students in Na h-Eileanan Siar were in Gaelic-medium education. The strong majority of Gaelic-medium students are immersed in Gaelic only during their primary education years. 87% of all Gaelic-medium education pupils at the secondary level are located in just three council areas: Glasgow City (409 pupils); Na h-Eileanan Siar (386); and Highland (294).

Over 6,800 other pupils in Scotland were receiving instruction in Gaelic language courses in 2021.

		Number of Pupils	Per 1000 pupils at that level
Gaelic the only subject taught through Gaelic	Secondary pupils	333	1.1
Gaelic learner classes	Secondary pupils	2,631	8.6
Gaelic learner classes	Primary pupils	3,844	9.8
Gaelic learner classes	ALL PUPILS	6,475	9.2
TOTAL		6,808	9.7

In Na h-Eileanan Siar, nearly 100% of all pupils were receiving some form of Gaelic-language education in 2021. In second place was Argyll & Bute at 17.5%, with the Highland council area in third at 8.8%. On the reverse side, fourteen council areas had no students at all receiving any education in Gaelic.

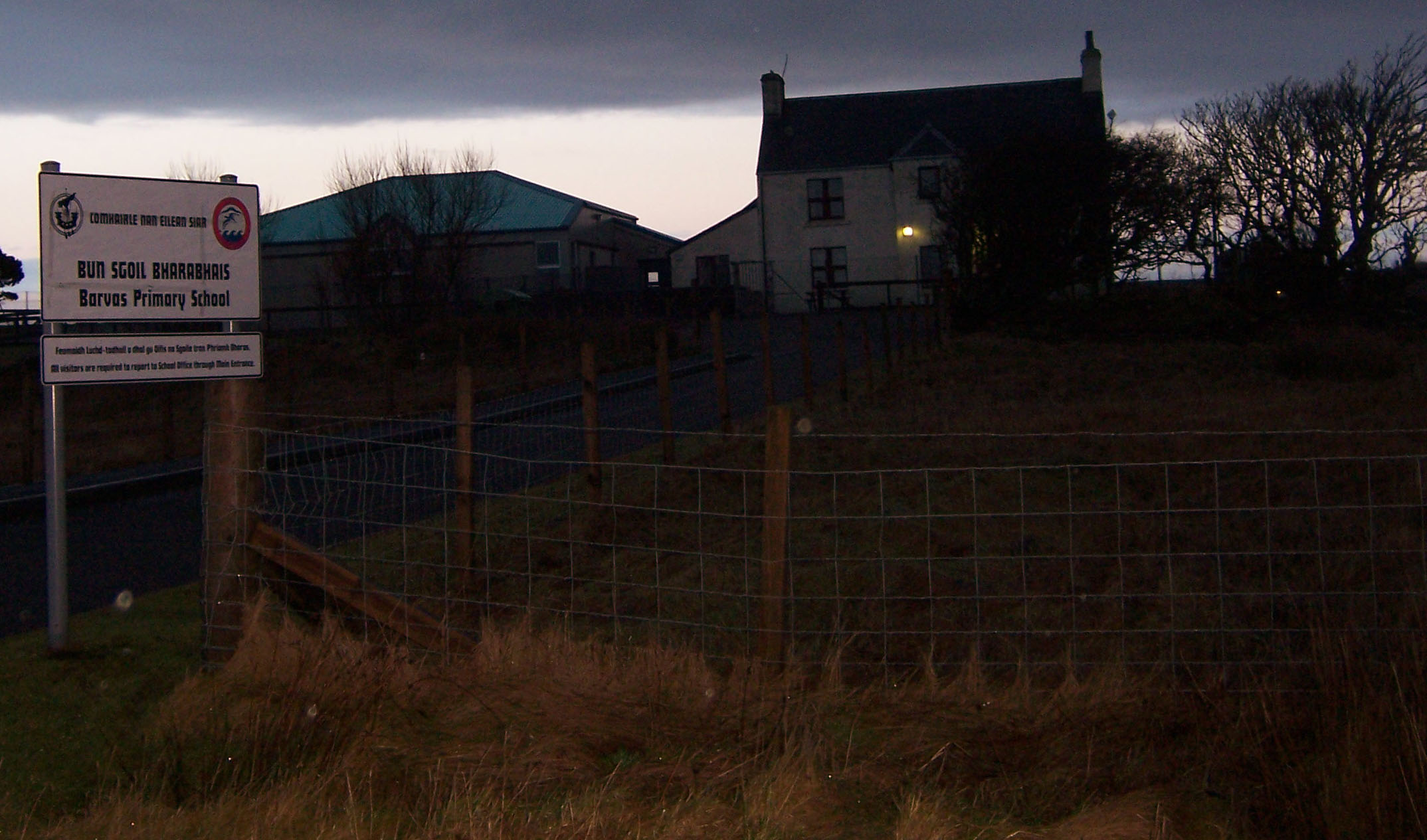
Bun-Sgoil Bharabhais is an example of a Primary School containing a Gaelic-medium unit

There are an increasing number of dedicated Gaelic-medium schools in Scotland. The largest is Sgoil Ghàidhlig Ghlaschu (Glasgow Gaelic School), established in 2006 and catering to pupils aged three to eighteen, the country's first 3–18 Gaelic-medium school. At the beginning of the 2020/21 academic year the school enrolled 391 students at the secondary level and 440 students at the primary level. The country's only other dedicated Gaelic-medium secondary school is Sgoil Lionacleit on the island of Benbecula in Na h-Eileanan Siar which enrolled 277 students in 2020/21. Several Gaelic language primary schools exist in the Western Isles. Outside that region, Bun-sgoil Ghàidhlig Inbhir Nis opened in 2007 in Inverness and serves pupils in class 1–7, as does Bun-sgoil Taobh na Pàirce which opened in 2013 in the capital city of Edinburgh. Apart from the primary unit at Sgoil Ghàidhlig Ghlaschu, Glasgow City operates two other GME primary schools: Bunsgoil Ghaidhlig Ghleann Dail (Glendale Gaelic Primary School) and Bun-sgoil Ghàidhlig Bhaile a' Ghobhainn (Govan Gaelic Primary School). In 2024 the city is expected to open a fourth Gaelic primary school in the Calton district. A new Gaelic-medium primary school, Bun-sgoil Ghàidhlig Loch Abar, opened in Caol near Fort William in 2015, and Bun-sgoil Ghàidhlig Phort Righ opened in Portree in 2018. Also in 2018 the Sgoil na Coille Nuaidh opened in Kilmarnock.

Apart from such schools, Gaelic-medium education is also provided through Gaelic-medium units within English-speaking schools. Bun-sgoil Shlèite on the Isle of Skye is the exception in that it is a Gaelic school with an English-medium unit. The largest Gaelic unit is at Mount Cameron Primary School in East Kilbride which enrolled 70 pupils at the start of the 2015/16 school year.

=== Effectiveness ===
Two separate studies have confirmed that the academic performance of Gaelic-medium educated children equals – and in some cases even exceeds – the performance of English-medium educated children, including when controlling for the economic class of the children studied.

However, several other studies have found that few Gaelic-medium educated children demonstrate native-like, or fully bilingual, abilities in Gaelic:

"researchers in these studies [(cf. Landgraf 2013; Nance 2013; MacLeod et al. 2014). Landgraf (2013) and Macleod et al. (2014)] observed frequent and unmarked use of non-native-like features in GME students' syntax, morphology and phonology, both through ethnographic observations in the classroom and individual interviews."

In her 2013 thesis, Julia Landgraf found that the few GME students exhibiting fully bilingual abilities came from Gaelic-speaking households. And it is now apparent that GME students from cities and from Gaelic-speaking areas are increasingly exhibiting English-influenced phonology.

Furthermore, not all graduates end up using the language much as adults. In Dunmore's study of 46 adults from a GME background, a majority were classified as "low use." Usage was strongly correlated with language abilities. Those who came from Gaelic-speaking homes, continued studying Gaelic in university, and/or found Gaelic employment after school were more likely to use the language as adults.

== History ==
=== 17th century ===
The attitudes towards education and the promotion of Anglicisation have been described as resulting from "confrontation of two disparate societies...Lowland Scotland made plain its anxiety concerning the unreformed society in the north in terms of unease concerning its language, which was identified as the chief cause of barbarity, ignorance and popery" and can be seen as a continuation of such policies going back to 1609 and the Statutes of Iona which saw the Gaelic-speaking nobility of Scotland forced to send their children to be educated in English-speaking Lowland Scotland; an act which has been described as "the first of a succession of measures taken by the Scottish government specifically aimed at the extirpation of the Gaelic language, the destruction of its traditional culture and the suppression of its bearers." This was followed in 1616 by an act of the privy council which included a requirement that the children of the Highland nobility must be capable of speaking, reading and writing English if they were to be recognised as heirs.

=== 18th century ===
The history of Gaelic language schools (in the modern sense) in Scotland can be traced back to the early 18th century and the schools of the Society in Scotland for Propagating Christian Knowledge or SSPCK. Ironically, one of the primary aims of the society was the de-Gaelicisation of the Highlands, and initially its schools taught exclusively through the medium of the English language with the equivalent use of Gaelic prohibited. However, the insistence on teaching children in a language which was (in almost all cases) entirely foreign to them resulted in very little progress with regards to establishing literacy in the English language. This situation persisted until the defeat of the Jacobite rising of 1745 in 1746 and the consequent collapse of the Gaelic-speaking political structures in the decades following the rebellion's suppression. The change in political atmosphere following the Disarming Act, as well as campaigning by the likes of Samuel Johnson – who was aghast at the fact the SSPCK was actively preventing the publication of the Bible into Scottish Gaelic — led to the change in attitudes within the Society. Johnson had to say of the matter:

"...there remains only their language and their poverty. Their language is attacked on every side. Schools are erected in which English only is taught and there were lately some who thought it reasonable to refuse them a version of the Holy Scriptures, that they might have no monument to their mother tongue."

Johnson, despite being commonly viewed as both anti-Scottish and anti-Gaelic, was actively involved in campaigning for the production of Gaelic literature and proposed the creation of a Gaelic press in the Isle of Skye. The change in attitudes resulted in the production, by the SSPCK, of a Gaelic version of the New Testament in 1767 with the Old Testament being translated and published in 1801. 1767 also saw the SSPCK switch from English to Gaelic as the language of instruction in their Highland schools. A school in Inverness, Raining School, was also established to provide training for Gaelic-speaking teachers.

=== 19th century ===
The 19th century saw the establishment of the first Gaelic school society — the Edinburgh Society for the Support of Gaelic Schools – in 1811. The society stated its purpose thus:

"(the) sole object being to teach the inhabitants of the Highlands and Islands to read the Sacred Scriptures in their native tongue...to maintain Circulating Schools in which the Gaelic language only shall be taught."

The new society attracted much support with similar organisations being founded in Glasgow and Inverness. The early success of the Edinburgh society was such that by 1828 it funded 85 schools in the Highlands and Islands with its sister societies enjoying similar levels of success. Following the early period of success the groups encountered financial difficulties due to poor administration and started to decline around 1830. By 1850 only the original Edinburgh society remained, although this branch, with strong support from the Edinburgh Ladies' Educational Association, continued until 1892.

The Education (Scotland) Act 1872 introduced mandatory 5-13 education across Scotland, though the act did not specify any medium of instruction, leaving instruction, standards, taught subjects, the accreditation, inspection, along with the hiring and dismissal of teachers, to the new, Edinburgh based, Board of Education for Scotland, in combination with the numerous new locally elected Education boards; these boards also being granted the power to regulate existing schools in their districts. The new locally elected boards effectively put an end to non–English-medium education and led to the discouragement of Gaelic with pupils being punished by teachers for speaking the language. The effect of the education act upon the Gaelic language has been described as "disastrous" and the continuation of a general policy (by both Scottish, and post 1707, British) which aimed at Anglicisation.

Pressure upon the Scottish Education Department in the years immediately following the Education (Scotland) Act 1872 saw the gradual reintroduction of certain measures providing for the use of Gaelic in schools. This pressure led to the undertaking by the department of a survey in 1876 which revealed a "distinct majority" of school boards within the Highlands in favour of the inclusion of Gaelic within the curriculum although it also revealed that some of those in Gaelic-speaking areas were against this. However, the continuing reluctance of school boards to take full advantages of the limited provisions made for Gaelic within the school curriculum as well as the problems of financing the Education Act generally saw little use of the limited provisions for Gaelic within the schools. The severe financial difficulties suffered by Highland schools at this time saw the introduction of the "Highland Minute" in 1887 which aimed at aiding designated boards financially while also recognising Gaelic as a specific subject in the higher classes of both elementary and secondary schools. Grants to aid the supply of Gaelic-speaking teachers were also introduced.

Despite these small measures towards the reintroduction of Gaelic into the classroom the manner in which the language was taught is thought to have contributed to its decline with the language being taught not as the native tongue of the pupils, via the medium of the language itself, but as an academic subject to be studied only through the English language with ever decreasing numbers of students studying the language.

== See also ==
- Clì Gàidhlig – organization supporting learners of the Gaelic language
