= Tollcross Primary School =

Primary school in Edinburgh, Scotland

Coordinates: 55°56′35.880″N 3°12′22.860″W

- Scottish Gaelic: Bunsgoil Crois na Cìse

Information
- Established: 1912; 114 years ago
- Language: English (1912-present); Scottish Gaelic (1989-2013)

Tollcross Primary School (Scottish Gaelic: Bunsgoil Crois na Cìse) is a mixed non-denominational primary school on Fountainbridge near Tollcross in Edinburgh.

== History ==
The school was founded in 1912.

=== Gaelic Medium Education ===
The school opened a Gaelic Medium Education Unit in 1989, which offered the only Gaelic medium primary education in Edinburgh and the Lothians until this medium got its own facility called Bun-sgoil Taobh na Pàirce situated at the old Bonnington primary building.

The last class of Gaelic speakers graduated in 2013.

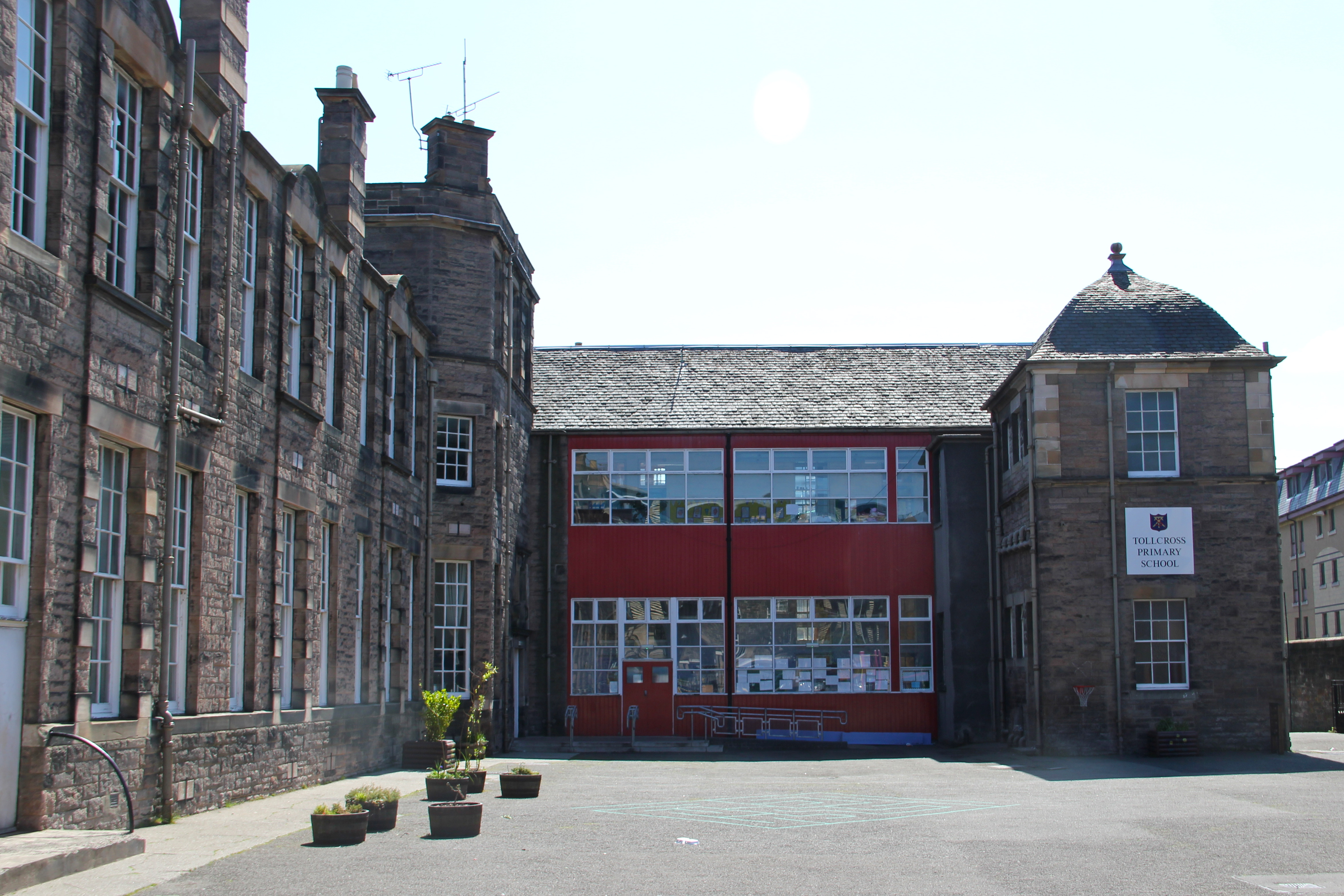
Tollcross Primary School
