= Mòd =

Scottish Gaelic song, arts and culture festival

A mòd is a festival of Scottish Gaelic song, arts and culture. The Gaelic word mòd (Scottish Gaelic: [mɔːt̪]), which was borrowed from Old Norse mót and is therefore cognate with English moot, refers to a Viking Age Thing or a similar kind of assembly.

There is an annual Scottish national mòd, the Royal National Mòd, as well as local mòds. Mòds are run under the auspices of An Comunn Gàidhealach. The term comes from a Gaelic word for a parliament or congress in common use during the Lordship of the Isles.

A mòd largely takes the form of formal competitions. Choral events (in Gaelic, both solo and choirs), and traditional music including fiddle, bagpipe and folk groups dominate. Spoken word events include children's and adults' poetry reading, storytelling and Bible reading, and categories such as Ancient Folk Tale or Humorous Monologue. Children can also present an original drama, and there are competitions in written Scottish Gaelic literature. Unlike the National Mòd, local mòds usually only last a day or two. They attract a much smaller crowd and the only notable social event is the winners' ceilidh. As there are fewer competitions than in the National Mòd, this ceilidh is often more like a traditional ceilidh with dancing and guest singers between the winners' performances.

Culturally, mòds are comparable to an Irish feis or the Seachtain na Gaeilge, or the Welsh eisteddfod.

In British Columbia, the Gaelic Society of Vancouver held a local Mòd biannually from 1990 to 2007.

The first US National Mòd was organized by Donald F. MacDonald, the founder of the Grandfather Mountain Highland games in North Carolina, and held at Alexandria, Virginia in 1988. The US National Mòd is now held as part of the annual Highland games at Ligonier, Pennsylvania and sponsored by An Comunn Gàidhealach Ameireaganach ("The American Scottish Gaelic Society").

== List of mòds ==
- Royal National Mòd
- Aberdeen Mòd
- Caithness and Sutherland Mòd
- Dalriada Mòd (Lochgilphead area)
- Easter Ross Mòd
- East Kilbride Mòd
- Edinburgh Mòd
- Glasgow Mòd
- Harris Mòd
- Inverness Mòd
- Islay Mòd
- Kyle Mòd
- Lewis Mòd
- Lochaber Mòd, based in Bun-sgoil Ghàidhlig Loch Abar
- Oban Mòd
- Mull Mòd
- Perthshire and Angus Mòd, based in Breadalbane Academy, Aberfeldy
- Skye Mòd
- Stirling Mòd
- Uist Mòd
- Wester Ross Mòd
- Ardnamurchan Mòd

=== Scottish diaspora ===
- Nova Scotia Gaelic Mod
- Vancouver Mòd (see Canadian Gaelic)
- U.S. National Mòd, held annually as part of the Highland games at Ligonier, Pennsylvania and sponsored by An Comunn Gàidhealach Ameireaganach ("The American Scottish Gaelic Society").

== In popular culture ==
- 1955 The Mòd at Grand Pré: A Nova Scotian Light Opera in Two Acts, Libretto by Watson Kirkconnell, music by E.A. Collins. Wolfville, Nova Scotia.

== See also ==
- Celtic festivals
- List of Celtic choirs#Scotland
- List of Celtic festivals
