= Cytgan =

Welsh chamber choir without a conductor

Cytgan (Welsh for 'chorus') is a chamber choir whose members come from all over Wales and sing without a conductor. The choir was established in 1999 while many of its members were in the National Youth Choir of Wales. The choir’s intention at the time was to ensure opportunities for its members to sing together all year round while continuing to develop their choral abilities and friendship. Since its inception Cytgan has gone from strength to strength, staging concerts around Wales and England, and has enjoyed considerable success in competitions. It is a regular competitor at Gŵyl Fawr Aberteifi, the annual Gŵyl Cerdd Dant and the National Eisteddfod of Wales. Cytgan won the youth choir competition at the National Eisteddfod at Meifod in 2003. The choir also brought the 2005 Llandeilo Music Festival to a close, and reached the final round of the S4C Cor Cymru 2005 mixed choir competition. The choir's CD, 'Cytgan', which was released by Fflach Records, has also been successful. The choir was also involved in the recording of Karl Jenkins latest CD, 'Requiem'. Members of Cytgan have often been invited to participate in radio and television programmes.

The choir has been a part of the great resurgence in Wales for choral singing over the last ten years. In addition Cordydd, CF1, Côr Cyntaf i’r Felin, Bechgyn Bro Taf, Ar ol Tri, Bois y Castell, Cor Caerdydd, the Ardwyn and many others all contribute massively to both the social and musical life in Wales.

== Choir members ==
The members of the choir are:

- Soprano: Elin Llwyd, Ceri Mears, Melissa Henry, Lowri Morris, Catrin Evans,
- Alto: Elin Griffiths, Bethan Lloyd, Catrin Mears, Laura Davies, Laura Price, Ruth Leggett
- Tenor: Gareth Evans, Rhys Davies, Iwan Griffiths
- Bass: Elis Griffiths, Rhys Griffiths, David Leggett, Peter Leggett
- Accompanist: Ruth Leggett
