= Slackbuie =

- Slackbuie community boundaries
- Country: Scotland

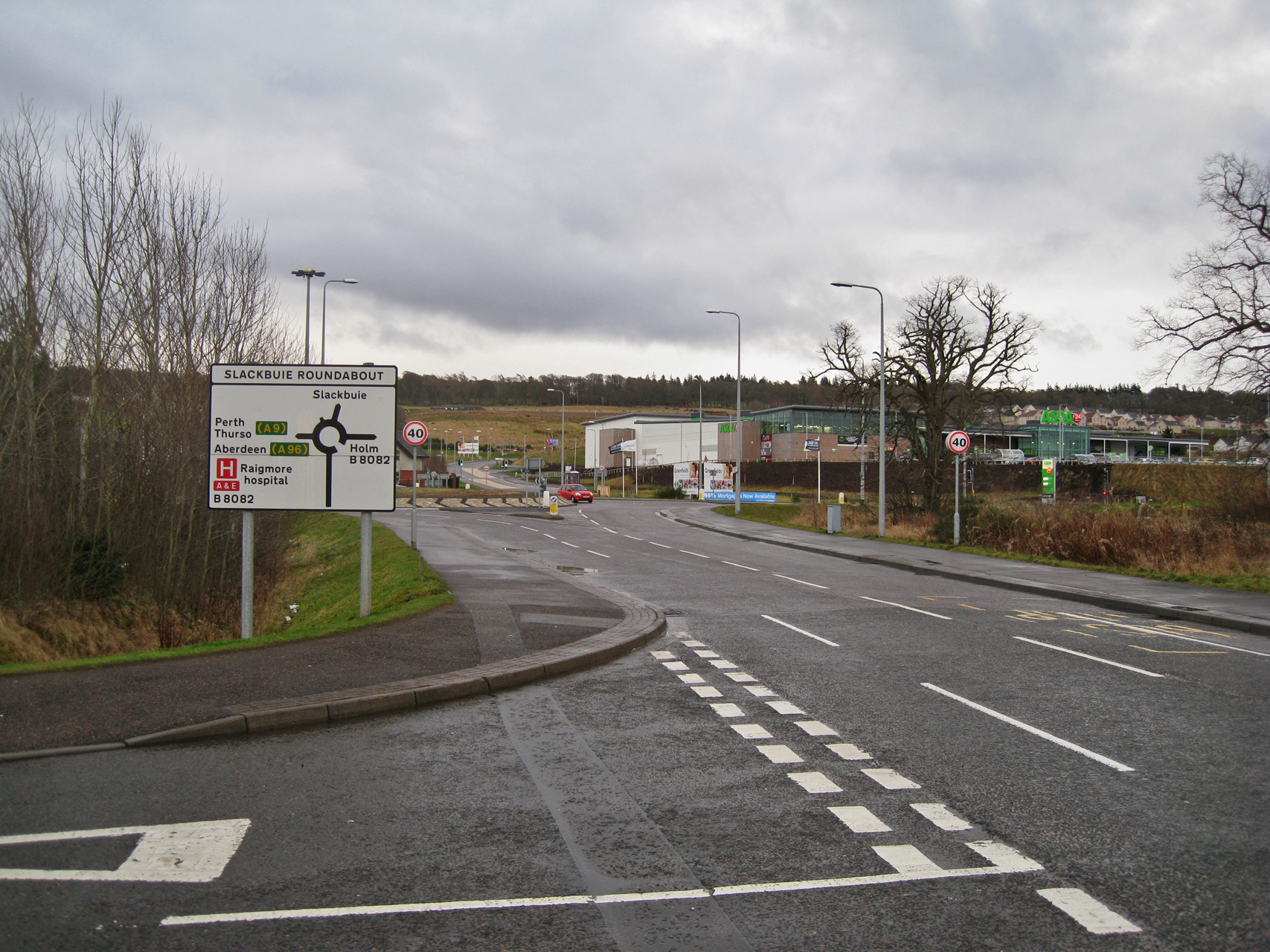
Slackbuie Roundabout (2013)

Slackbuie is a residential area in the southern part of Inverness, Scotland. The name "Slackbuie" is derived from the Gaelic "Slag Buidhe," meaning "The yellow hollow". Several new housing developments form the present day Slackbuie.
