= Highland Minute =

The Highland Minute was a form of educational subsidy, first established by the Committee of Council on Education in Scotland, dated 30 April 1885. The intent was to alleviate some of the heavy financial burden encountered in providing education to sparse rural populations in the Scottish Highlands.

The subsidy also intended to effect Gaelic language education in Scotland.

In 1908, the Education Department had notified participating boards that they intended to withdraw the aid after six months. Despite these plans to end this scheme, three schools in Lewis were still receiving this aid In 1910: Barva, Lochs and Uig.
