= Glasgow Gaelic School =

- Sgoil Ghàidhlig Ghlaschu
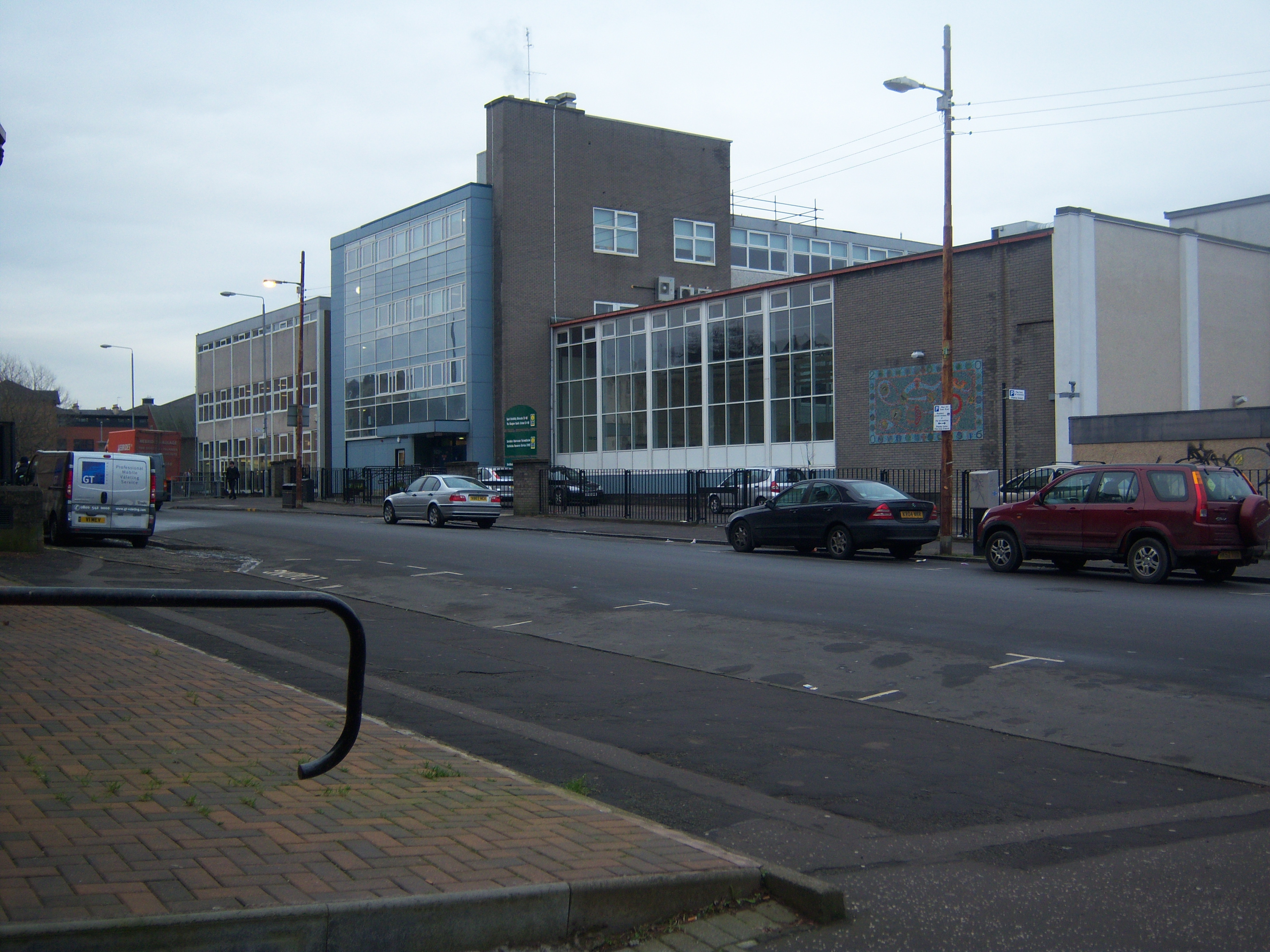

Location
- 147 Berkeley Street; Glasgow, G3 7HP; Scotland; 55.8645°N 4.2799°W

Information
- Type: Nursery, Primary, Secondary
- Motto: Cànan. Cultar. Cothrom. (Language. Culture. Opportunity.)
- Religious affiliation: Non-denominational
- Established: 2006
- Local authority: Glasgow City Council
- Head Teacher/Ceannard na Sgoile (of the primary school): Nellie MacIntyre
- Head Teacher/Ceannard na Sgoile (of the secondary school): Gillian Campbell-Thow
- Age: 3 to 18
- Enrolment: 630 (Sept 2011)
- Language: Scottish Gaelic
- Colours: Red, Black, Gold

Glasgow Gaelic School (Scottish Gaelic: Sgoil Ghàidhlig Ghlaschu) is a primary and secondary school in Glasgow, Scotland which teaches through the medium of Scottish Gaelic. This teaching method is commonly known as Gaelic medium education. The secondary school catchment area serves the whole of Glasgow and the primary school catchment is in the west of the city.

GME primary provision is offered at Bun-Sgoil Sgoil Ghàidhlig Ghlaschu, Glendale Gaelic Primary and Bun-sgoil Ghàidhlig Bhaile a' Ghobhainn (Govan Gaelic Primary School).

== History ==
The first Gaelic School opened in 1999 as a primary school only: Bun-Sgoil Ghàidhlig Ghlaschu (Glasgow Gaelic Primary School) situated in Ashley Street, Woodlands. As the school roll grew it became necessary to relocate to larger premises. Unused buildings at Berkeley Street, Sandyford (also a site used by Woodside Secondary School until 1999), were identified, and reopened in August 2006 as Glasgow Gaelic School, providing Gaelic medium education for pre-5, primary and secondary pupils.

== See also ==
- Gaelic medium education in Scotland
- Gaelscoileanna for Irish-gaelic medium education in Ireland
