= Bun-sgoil Taobh na Pàirce =

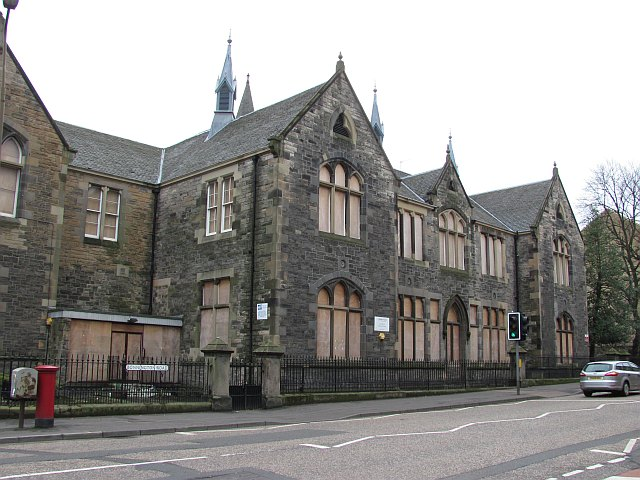
- Former Bonnington Primary School building in 2008, before it was occupied by Bun-sgoil Taobh na Pàirce

Location
- 139 Bonnington Road; Bonnington; Edinburgh, EH6 5NQ; Scotland; 55.9705°N 3.1797°W

Information
- Type: Primary
- Motto: Edinburgh's Gaelic Primary School
- Established: August 2013
- Local authority: City of Edinburgh
- Headmistress: Laura Stewart
- Head teacher: A’ Bh-uas. L. Stewart
- Staff: 52
- Gender: All (including non-binary)
- Enrollment: 418
- Language: Scottish Gaelic
- Houses: Lewis, Barra, Harris, Uist
- Website: www.taobhnapairce.co.uk

Bun-sgoil Taobh na Pàirce (English: Parkside Primary School, referring to the adjoining Pilrig Park) is a Gaelic medium primary school in Edinburgh, Scotland. Administered by the City of Edinburgh Council, the school is open to any parents in the city or surrounding areas who wish to have their children learn and be educated through Scottish Gaelic. The opening of Edinburgh's first dedicated Gaelic school on 16 August 2013, after many years of campaigning by parents and supporters, was hailed as a "landmark day" for the Scottish capital.

Situated in the south of the district (and former municipal burgh) of Leith, Bun-sgoil Taobh na Pàirce is housed in the refurbished former Bonnington Primary School building. The original 2-storey T-shaped school was built between 1875 and 1877 to the plans of James Simpson (1832-1894), then architect of the Leith School Board, and subsequently extended in 1907 by Simpson's old apprentice and eventual successor, George Craig (1852-1928).

As of March 2021 Bun-sgoil Taobh na Pàirce has a pupil roll of 418 pupils across 16 classes, as well as provision for a 40:40 Nursery. The school originated in the highly successful Gaelic unit within Tollcross Primary School. The unit opened in 1988 as a single class with seven children and subsequently grew in size and stature. The majority of children in Gaelic-medium education at Tollcross Primary School transferred to Bun-sgoil Taobh na Pàirce at its opening.

The school feeds into James Gillespie's High School, which has a Gaelic language unit for 120 pupils, for Secondary education. The City of Edinburgh Council are currently considering options for a replacement, standalone Gaelic Medium secondary school. Sites which have been considered include on a shared campus with Liberton High School or on vacated sites at the former Lothian and Borders Police headquarters in Fettes Avenue or the Royal Victoria Hospital in Craigleith.

The school houses include, Leòdhas (Lewis), Barraigh (Barra), Uibhist (Uist), Na Hearadh (Harris). The houses are named after Scottish Islands and so are the classes (Ronaigh, Scalpaigh ect.).

== See also ==
- Gaelic medium education in Scotland
- Gaelscoileanna for Irish-gaelic medium education in Ireland.
