= 2024 in Scottish television =

This is a list of events taking place in 2024 relating to Scottish television.

== Events ==
=== January ===
- 1 January – STV's Bringing in the Bells is hosted by Alex Norton, Blythe Duff, Martin Compston and others to see in the New Year.

=== June ===
- 4 June – 2024 United Kingdom general election: The first leaders debate takes place in Scotland, with the leaders of Scotland's four main political parties taking part in a debate on STV.
- 11 June – BBC Scotland airs an election debate featuring the leaders of Scotland's five main political parties: John Swinney (SNP), Douglas Ross (Scottish Conservatives), Anas Sarwar (Scottish Labour), Alex Cole-Hamilton (Scottish Liberal Democrats) and Lorna Slater (Scottish Greens).

=== July ===
- 1 July – Steve Carson is to step down as Head of Multi-Platform Commissioning at BBC Scotland in September, in order to take up a senior role at Irish broadcaster RTÉ.

=== August ===
- 6 August – Ofcom approves planned changes to the BBC Scotland television channel that will see cutbacks to its news, with its hour-long 9pm weekday programme The Nine replaced by a 30 minute programme at 7pm.

=== December ===
- 9 December – BBC Scotland announces the launch of two new news programmes in early 2025: Reporting Scotland: News at Seven, a weeknight news bulletin presented by Laura Maciver and Amy Irons on the BBC Scotland channel from 6 January, and the Scotcast podcast with Martin Geissler launching on 13 January.
- 22 December – BBC Scotland announces the end of the Sportscene Results programme which had been a longstanding football results service on BBC One Scotland. From early January, they planned for a new format with results to be delivered by Radio Scotland's Open All Mics team with some visualisation.

== Debuts ==
- 10 September – Salmond and Sturgeon: A Troubled Union on BBC Scotland

== Ongoing television programmes ==
=== 1960s ===
- Reporting Scotland (1968–1983; 1984–present)

=== 1970s ===
- Sportscene (1975–present)
- Landward (1976–present)
- The Beechgrove Garden (1978–present)

=== 1990s ===
- Eòrpa (1993–present)

=== 2000s ===
- River City (2002–2026)
- The Adventure Show (2005–present)
- An Là (2008–present)
- Trusadh (2008–present)
- STV Rugby (2009–2010; 2011–present)
- STV News at Six (2009–present)

=== 2010s ===
- Scotland Tonight (2011–present)
- Shetland (2013–present)
- Scot Squad (2014–present)
- Still Game (2016–present)
- Two Doors Down (2016–present)
- The Nine (2019–present)
- Debate Night (2019–present)
- A View from the Terrace (2019–present)

== Deaths ==
- 6 March – Nick Sheridan, 32, Irish journalist and television presenter (News2day, Reporting Scotland, The Nine)
- 14 May – Gudrun Ure, 98, actress (Super Gran)
- 26 June – Pat Heywood, 92, actress (Lucky Feller, Wuthering Heights, Inspector Morse, Root Into Europe)
- 28 July – John Anderson, 92, television referee (Gladiators)
- 5 August – Ron Bain, 79, actor (Naked Video)
- 9 August – Brian Marjoribanks, 82, Scottish footballer (Hibernian), actor and broadcaster (BBC Scotland).
- 2 November – Janey Godley, 63, comedian (Have I Got News for You) and actress (River City)

== See also ==
- 2024 in Scotland
