= 2019 in Scottish television =

This is a list of events in Scottish television from 2019.

== Events ==
=== February ===
- 12 February – Details of BBC Scotland's flagship news programme, The Nine, are released. The 60-minute programme will air daily from 9.00pm, and has a fifteen strong team of presenters and reporters. It will be anchored by Rebecca Curran and Martin Geissler.
- 17 February – BBC Two Scotland closes in preparation for the launch of the BBC Scotland channel. Viewers in Scotland can still watch the national version of BBC Two, with regional content aired by BBC Two Scotland being transferred to the new channel.
- 24 February – At 7pm, the BBC Scotland channel launches. Overnight figures indicate it to have had a peak viewership of 700,000, with five of the top ten programmes seen in Scotland being aired by BBC Scotland.
- 25 February – BBC Scotland launches its weekday flagship news programme The Nine.
- 27 February – Launch of Debate Night, BBC Scotland's weekly political debate show.

=== April ===
- 11 April – Jackie Bird presents her final bulletin for Reporting Scotland, after thirty years of appearing on the programme.

=== November ===
- 26 November – Details of three BBC Scotland comedy programmes for 2020, are released. Three 30 minute shows were commissioned: The Scotts, Group and the Daly Grind.

== Debuts ==
=== BBC ===
- 25 February – The Nine on BBC Scotland
- 27 February – Debate Night on BBC Scotland
- 1 March – A View from the Terrace on BBC Scotland
- 26 March – Rogue to Wrestler on BBC Scotland
- 7 August – Jamie Genevieve: A Year in the Life on BBC Scotland
- 10 November – The Big Scottish Book Club on BBC Scotland

== Television series ==
- Reporting Scotland (1968–1983; 1984–present)
- Sportscene (1975–present)
- Landward (1976–present)
- The Beechgrove Garden (1978–present)
- Eòrpa (1993–present)
- Only an Excuse? (1993–2020)
- River City (2002–2026)
- The Adventure Show (2005–present)
- Daybreak Scotland (2007–present)
- An Là (2008–present)
- Trusadh (2008–present)
- STV Rugby (2009–2010; 2011–present)
- STV News at Six (2009–present)
- The Nightshift (2010–present)
- Scotland Tonight (2011–present)
- Shetland (2013–present)
- Scot Squad (2014–present)
- Two Doors Down (2016–present)
- Molly and Mack (2018–2022)

== Ending this year ==
- Still Game (2002–2007; 2016–2019)

== See also ==
- 2019 in Scotland
