= 2025 in Scottish television =

This is a list of events taking place in 2025 relating to Scottish television.

== Events ==
=== January ===
- 1 January – Seeing in the New Year: BBC Scotland's Hogmanay will be hosted by Amy Irons and Des Clarke and others, with most of the show pre-recorded. STV's Bringing in the Bells will be hosted by Seán Batty, Laura Boyd, Jean Johansson, Grado and others.
- 2 January – The very last edition of Sportscene Results is broadcast.
- 6 January – Debut of BBC Scotland's new weeknight news bulletin, Reporting Scotland: News at Seven, presented by Laura Maciver and Amy Irons.
- 9 January – On BBC One Scotland Sportscene Results' replacement begins. Called Open All Mics, the programme is an in-vision simulcasts of BBC Radio Scotland supplemented by on-screen graphics such as the vidiprinter, scores, statistics and match summaries.
- 30 January – Sally Magnusson announces she will stand down as presenter of the BBC's Reporting Scotland in April, but will continue to work for the BBC on a freelance basis.

=== March ===
- 18 March – BBC Scotland announces its flagship soap, River City, will end in Autumn 2026 after 24 years on air.

=== April ===
- 24 April – Stars of Scottish soap River City stage a protest against its cancellation outside the Scottish Parliament.
- 30 April – Laura Goodwin is named as the new lead presenter of Reporting Scotland.

=== July ===
- 17 July – It is announced that Scottish comedy Two Doors Down will return for a 2025 Christmas special.

== Debuts ==
- BBC Reporting Scotland: News at Seven
- January – An t-Eilean

== Ongoing television programmes ==
=== 1960s ===
- Reporting Scotland (1968–1983; 1984–present)

=== 1970s ===
- Sportscene (1975–present)
- Landward (1976–present)
- The Beechgrove Garden (1978–present)

=== 1990s ===
- Eòrpa (1993–present)

=== 2000s ===
- River City (2002–2026)
- The Adventure Show (2005–present)
- An Là (2008–present)
- Trusadh (2008–present)
- STV Rugby (2009–2010; 2011–present)
- STV News at Six (2009–present)

=== 2010s ===
- Scotland Tonight (2011–present)
- Shetland (2013–present)
- Scot Squad (2014–present)
- Still Game (2016–present)
- Two Doors Down (2016–present)
- The Nine (2019–present)
- Debate Night (2019–present)
- A View from the Terrace (2019–present)

== Deaths ==
- 18 February – James Martin, 93, Scottish actor (Still Game).
- 13 April – Paddy Higson, 83, Scottish film and television producer (Taggart) and (Brond).
- 9 July – Glen Michael, 99, children's television presenter and entertainer (Glen Michael's Cartoon Cavalcade).
- 11 December – Stanley Baxter, 99, Scottish comedian, impressionist and entertainer.

== See also ==
- 2025 in Scotland
