= 2020 in Scottish television =

This is a list of events in Scottish television from 2020.

== Events ==
=== July ===
- 31 July – Steve Carson named as new director of BBC Scotland, to replace Donalda MacKinnon later in the year.

=== August ===
- 25 August – Filming recommences on BBC Scotland's soap River City after it was suspended because of the COVID-19 pandemic.

=== October ===
- 19 October – Steve Carson starts as director of BBC Scotland. Around twenty staff departures, including some long-serving correspondents, are announced, as attempts are made to reduce the budget of the organisation by around £6.2 million by April.

=== November ===
- 4 November – Amazon announces that its supernatural thriller series The Rig is to be filmed in Scotland.
- 7 November – Sky Sports announces that the Scotland and Northern Ireland Euro 2020 play-off finals will be made free-to-air on UK television.

=== December ===
- 1 December – BBC Scotland announces that Susan Calman will front their Hogmanay Live programme for a second time, with Deacon Blue, Amy Macdonald and Blazin' Fiddles. Jackie Bird is to host an hour-long programme celebrating Scotland's heroes of the coronavirus pandemic.
- 19 December – Nicola Walker will take on the role of DI Annika Strandhed in a UKTV drama series around murders that are discovered in the waterways of Scotland.
- 27 December – Details of the cast for BBC Scotland's Hogmanay programme for 2020, are released.
- 31 December – Hogmanay Live with Susan Calman sees in the New Year; overnight viewing figures indicate it is watched by 1.05 million viewers.

== Debuts ==
=== BBC ===
The Scotts, Group and the Daly Grind.

== Ongoing television programmes ==
=== 1960s ===
- Reporting Scotland (1968–1983; 1984–present)

=== 1970s ===
- Sportscene (1975–present)
- Landward (1976–present)
- The Beechgrove Garden (1978–present)

=== 1990s ===
- Eòrpa (1993–present)

=== 2000s ===
- River City (2002–2026)
- The Adventure Show (2005–present)
- An Là (2008–present)
- Trusadh (2008–present)
- STV Rugby (2009–2010; 2011–present)
- STV News at Six (2009–present)

=== 2010s ===
- Scotland Tonight (2011–present)
- Shetland (2013–present)
- Scot Squad (2014–present)
- Two Doors Down (2016–present)
- Molly and Mack (2018–2022)
- The Nine (2019–present)
- Debate Night (2019–present)
- A View from the Terrace (2019–present)

== Ending this year ==
- Only an Excuse? (1993–2020)

== Deaths ==
- 9 July – Johnny Beattie, 93, actor
- 15 July – Maurice Roëves, 83, actor
- 26 October – John Duncanson, 80, broadcaster (North Tonight)

== See also ==
- 2020 in Scotland
