= 2021 in Scottish television =

This is a list of events taking place in 2021 relating to Scottish television.

== Events ==
- 1 January – Hogmanay Live with Susan Calman sees in the New Year; overnight viewing figures indicate it is watched by 1.05 million viewers.
- 5 January – Up to sixteen traineeships on the Outlander programme are due to start leading to speculation that filming for the sixth season will commence in the same month., having been postponed in May 2020 due to the COVID-19 pandemic. Asked about rumours that this would be the final season, executive producer Maril Davis stated that: "We are not aware that this is the last season. ... But we don't have any additional seasons picked up yet".
- 9 September – Scottish Comedian Janey Godley is dropped from a Scottish Government health campaign urging people to wear face coverings and take lateral flow tests after historic tweets were published in which she made derogatory comments about a number of black performers.

== Debuts ==
=== BBC ===
The Sunday Show

== Ongoing television programmes ==
=== 1960s ===
- Reporting Scotland (1968–1983; 1984–present)

=== 1970s ===
- Sportscene (1975–present)
- Landward (1976–present)
- The Beechgrove Garden (1978–present)

=== 1990s ===
- Eòrpa (1993–present)

=== 2000s ===
- River City (2002–2026)
- The Adventure Show (2005–present)
- An Là (2008–present)
- Trusadh (2008–present)
- STV Rugby (2009–2010; 2011–present)
- STV News at Six (2009–present)

=== 2010s ===
- Scotland Tonight (2011–present)
- Shetland (2013–present)
- Scot Squad (2014–present)
- Two Doors Down (2016–present)
- Molly and Mack (2018–2022)
- The Nine (2019–present)
- Debate Night (2019–present)
- A View from the Terrace (2019–present)

== Deaths ==
- 18 January – Andy Gray, 61, actor and comedy writer (River City)
- 9 November – Gwyneth Guthrie, 84, actress (Take the High Road)

== See also ==
- 2021 in Scotland
