= 2022 in Scottish television =

This is a list of events taking place in 2022 relating to Scottish television.

== Events ==
- 1 January – BBC Scotland's Hogmanay to be hosted by Edith Bowman to see in the New Year.
- 24 September – River City celebrates its 20th anniversary.
- November – STV launches Night Vision, which features news, sport and weather from across Scotland. Previously, STV had broadcast ITV's overnight filler programme Unwind with ITV (which was branded by STV as Unwind with STV).

== Ongoing television programmes ==
=== 1960s ===
- Reporting Scotland (1968–1983; 1984–present)

=== 1970s ===
- Sportscene (1975–present)
- Landward (1976–present)
- The Beechgrove Garden (1978–present)

=== 1990s ===
- Eòrpa (1993–present)

=== 2000s ===
- River City (2002–2026)
- The Adventure Show (2005–present)
- An Là (2008–present)
- Trusadh (2008–present)
- STV Rugby (2009–2010; 2011–present)
- STV News at Six (2009–present)

=== 2010s ===
- Scotland Tonight (2011–present)
- Shetland (2013–present)
- Scot Squad (2014–present)
- Two Doors Down (2016–present)
- The Nine (2019–present)
- Debate Night (2019–present)
- A View from the Terrace (2019–present)

== Ending this year ==
- Molly and Mack (2018–2022)

== Deaths ==
- 2 March – John Stahl, 68, actor

== See also ==
- 2022 in Scotland
