= Christopher Blanchett =

English broadcast journalist

- Born: 1982 (age 43–44)
- Presenting career
- Show: Reporting Scotland
- Network: BBC
- Style: Weather presenter
- Country: Scotland
- Previous shows: BBC South Today, BBC London

Christopher Blanchett (born 1982) is an English weather presenter. He presents the weather forecast for Reporting Scotland. Previous roles include working as an assistant producer for the BBC News Channel.

== Education ==
Blanchett has a BA hons in human geography from Nottingham Trent University, graduating in 2004 with a master's degree in television journalism in 2005.

== Broadcasting career ==
Blanchett worked at a broadcast journalist for BBC South Today in Southampton, then for the BBC News Channel in London as a producer for the BBC Weather Centre. He then moved to Glasgow to present weather forecasts for BBC Scotland with Judith Ralston, Stav Danaos and Cat Cubie.

In 2012, he met and presented alongside Prince Charles, while the prince was on a visit to BBC Pacific Quay. With assistance from Blanchett, the prince presented the weather segment. Charles also comically stated during his forecast, "Who the hell wrote this script?" as references were made to royal residences.
