= Laura Miller (journalist) =

Scottish broadcast journalist

- Born: Glasgow, Scotland
- Education: University of Glasgow; University College Falmouth
- Occupations: Broadcaster, Journalist
- Television: Reporting Scotland

Laura Miller is a Scottish broadcast journalist and television presenter at BBC Scotland.

Miller anchors the corporations flagship Scottish news programme Reporting Scotland. Miller has presented the Monday to Wednesday editions of the programme since 2019.

In January 2025, Miller joined as a rotating host of the BBC’s Scottish news podcast, Scotcast, with Martin Geissler and Natalie Higgins.

== Early life and education ==
Miller grew up in Milton of Campsie in East Dunbartonshire and was educated at Kilsyth Academy. She attended the University of Glasgow from 1998 to 2002, graduating with a Bachelor of Laws (LLB) in Scots Law & French. In 2007, she earned a Master of Arts (MA) with Distinction in Broadcast Journalism from the University College Falmouth in Cornwall, England.

== Career ==
After graduating from Falmouth University, Miller produced an award-winning documentary on the 2004 Asian tsunami reconstruction in Thailand and secured BJTC Young Journalist of the Year. She joined STV News in December 2007, originally as a reporter and producer. Miller later presented the East Central Scotland edition of STV News at Six. She took maternity leave in May 2016, replaced by Lucy Whyte acting as STV News at Six presenter in the East region. She returned to the Edinburgh newsdesk on 15 May 2017.

In 2018, Miller made a small credited appearance in Avengers: Infinity War, where she played a news reporter who was reporting on an alien attack on New York.

In 2018, Miller left STV and joined BBC Scotland serving as the Consumer Affairs correspondent. In February 2019, she became a presenter on the BBC's The Nine, presenting the Friday night edition alongside John Beattie before they both quit the show in 2024.

In April 2019, Jackie Bird stood down as a presenter on the BBC's Reporting Scotland programme. In October, Miller was announced as the replacement of Bird as a main presenter, after she was chosen over rival candidates; Catriona Shearer, Amy Irons and Laura Goodwin. She fronts the programme Monday to Wednesday.

Miller joined the team of rotating hosts for BBC News Scotland podcast, Scotcast, from its second episode on 14 January 2025.

== Personal life ==
Miller lives in Edinburgh with her husband, a school teacher, and their daughter.
