= Gail McGrane =

British weather forecaster

- Born: Gail Pirie; 1975 (age 50–51); Dingwall, Rossshire, Scotland
- Partner: Jon McGrane
- Children: Eilidh Hope Pirie McGrane
- Presenting career
- Show: STV News
- Station: STV
- Style: Weather forecaster
- Country: Scotland
- Previous shows: Reporting Scotland (BBC Scotland)

Gail McGrane (née Gail Pirie: born 1975) is a television weather forecaster, previously the senior forecaster for BBC Scotland. Born in Dingwall, Ross-shire, McGrane attended Dingwall Academy before moving to Glasgow to attend the University of Strathclyde. She took a job at the Met Office in 1999 and began presenting breakfast weather reports in 2000, before moving to Reporting Scotland in early 2009. She has appeared as a weather consultant on several BBC Scotland productions.

== Early life and education ==
McGrane was born in Dingwall, Rossshire in 1975 and educated at Dingwall Academy. She moved to Glasgow, where she received an honours degree in geography and an MSc in environmental studies from the University of Strathclyde. She studied for one year at the University of Iowa in the United States, as part of her third-year studies.

She decided on a career as a forecaster during her studies, in particular due to an experience in Iowa where she had to escape from a tornado in her car. She recalls being mocked for her decision by a lecturer.

== Weather career ==
McGrane joined the Met Office in 1999, with Bill Giles as her mentor. Following her training at the Met Office College in Reading as a forecaster, she moved to the BBC Television Centre as a broadcast assistant, then moved to BBC Scotland as a weather forecaster at the end of 2000.

McGrane spent nine years as the #2 forecaster for BBC Scotland, spending much of her time working on the breakfast shift covering regular radio slots Good Morning Scotland, and Breakfast TV, where her job required her to get up at 3 am.

She covered the Weather on Reporting Scotland once or twice a week, but became lead weather presenter on Reporting Scotland in late December 2009, after the departure of Heather Reid, following the latter's decision to leave for a role at Learning and Teaching Scotland after fifteen years of presenting.

McGrane took maternity leave in 2011, along with her two female BBC Weather colleagues, Gillian Smart and Judith Ralston. In February 2012, it was announced that Gail would not return to the BBC, after deciding to quit.

In July 2012, Gail made her first appearance as a weather presenter on STV, where she was a relief forecaster for a short time. She later returned to the BBC.

== Other broadcasting ==
McGrane presents on Landward and previously appeared on The Beechgrove Garden as a forecaster.

== Personal life ==
McGrane lives in Glasgow with her husband Jon, an accountant. Her mother still lives in Dingwall. Together with her husband, McGrane has been a volunteer speaker for the Children's Hospice Association Scotland (CHAS), raising £30,000 in a gala ball.

She is a regular visitor to the United States, in particular Chicago, where she had her first direct experience of a tornado.

She is an avid fan of football club Ross County, having frequently stayed with her grandparents in a house adjacent to the club's ground Victoria Park as a child.
