= BBC Reporting Scotland: News at Seven =

- Title card used since January 2025
- Theme music composer: David Lowe
- Country of origin: Scotland
- Original language: English

Production
- Producers: BBC News; BBC Scotland
- Production locations: Studio C, BBC Pacific Quay, Glasgow
- Camera setup: Multi-camera
- Running time: 30 minutes (weekdays); 15 minutes (weekends)

Original release
- Network: BBC Scotland
- Release: 6 January 2025 – present

Related
- BBC Reporting Scotland; An Là

BBC Reporting Scotland: News at Seven is a news programme produced by BBC Scotland which broadcasts on the BBC Scotland television channel. It launched on 6 January 2025 as a replacement for The Nine.

== Background ==
In February 2024, BBC Scotland announced plans to scrap their flagship and main news programme, The Nine, from the BBC Scotland channel. The proposal was formally approved by Ofcom in August 2024. The cooperation stated that they wished to "grow the impact of broadcast news services in Scotland", and no jobs would be lost as a result of the programme ending. Steve Carson, the director of BBC Scotland, had been questioned by the Scottish Parliament over the low viewing figures of The Nine, with suggestions that viewer numbers were as low as 1,700 viewers, with one episode of The Seven, the weekend edition of The Nine, receiving as little as 200 viewers. Carson disputed such claims, and advised that both programmes reached an estimated audience of 100,000 and 20,000 each week respectively.

Following the approval by Ofcom in August 2024, it claimed that the shift to a 7 pm broadcast time and more focus on Scottish current affairs and news stories were "more in line" with what the Scottish public wanted. In response to the Ofcom report, the Scottish Government expressed concern, stating that they were "deeply concerned" and feared that the changes "could leave behind those that need the service the most". BBC Scotland welcomed the Ofcom report, and claimed that it would begin to formulate a plan for moving forward, including a replacement news broadcast, with a focus on "shaping the new offer for audiences over the coming months".

== Launch ==
BBC Reporting Scotland: News at Seven formally launched on 6 January 2025 with Laura Maciver and Amy Irons as the programmes main news anchors. It is broadcast each weekday at 7 pm on the BBC Scotland channel and is a compliment programme to BBC Reporting Scotland which airs on BBC One Scotland. With the launch of BBC Reporting Scotland: News at Seven, the BBC One Scotland broadcasting of Reporting Scotland will remain at 6:30 pm and will continue to serve as the broadcasters main news coverage for Scotland.

The programme features a more conversational tone and approach than that of BBC Reporting Scotland and the programme it replaced, with the broadcaster stating that it would "go behind the headlines, bringing insight, analysis, conversation and a bit of humour to the stories that audiences are talking about."

== Presenting team ==
=== Main programming ===
==== Current ====
- Amy Irons – news anchor (2025–present) (Monday-Friday) (rotating)
- Fiona Stalker – news anchor (2025–present) (Monday-Friday) (rotating)
- Sarah McMullan - relief news anchor (2025–present) (part-time)

==== Former ====
- Laura Maciver – news anchor (2025)

=== Support programming ===
- Martin Geissler – host of Scotcast (2025–present)

== See also ==
- BBC Scotland
- BBC Reporting Scotland
