= Scotcast =

- Genre: News podcast
- Created by: BBC Scotland
- Presented by: Martin Geissler; Laura Miller; Natalie Higgins
- Country of origin: United Kingdom
- Original language: English

Production
- Running time: 30–40 minutes
- Production company: BBC News

Original release
- Network: BBC iPlayer; BBC Scotland; BBC Sounds (podcast)
- Release: 16 January 2025 – present

Scotcast is a news and current affairs podcast produced by BBC Scotland. It provides analysis and discussion of Scottish politics, society and major news stories, often featuring BBC journalists, correspondents and guest contributors. It is presented by Martin Geissler, Laura Miller and Natalie Higgins.

== History ==
Scotcast was launched on 13 January 2025 by BBC Scotland as part of a broader refresh of its news and current affairs output. The podcast was introduced to expand the BBC’s digital offering in Scotland following the cancellation of The Nine and launch of BBC Reporting Scotland: News at Seven, providing on-demand political coverage alongside traditional television and radio programming. Ahead of the 2026 Scottish Parliament election, Scotcast aired interviews with the party leaders.

=== 2026 Scottish Parliament election ===
Ahead of the 2026 Scottish Parliament election, Scotcast broadcast a series of interviews with leaders of Scotland’s main political parties, covering issues such as the constitution, the economy and party strategy. In his interview, Reform UK Scotland leader Malcolm Offord discussed his recent defection from the Conservative Party, stating that the move had resulted in the loss of personal friendships while positioning himself within Nigel Farage’s party and its approach in Scotland. Meanwhile, SNP leader and First Minister John Swinney used the platform to reiterate his support for Scottish independence, and claimed that racism has caused the rise in support for Reform UK in Scotland.

== Notable guests ==
Since the podcast’s launch in 2025, it has had a variety of notable guests including the Scottish party leaders and public figures including singer, Callum Beattie.

== Format ==
Episodes of Scotcast are generally released multiple times per week, depending on the news agenda. The format combines discussion, interviews and analysis, with an emphasis on making complex political issues accessible to a broad audience.

Topics covered include elections, government policy, constitutional issues such as Scottish independence, and major social and economic developments affecting Scotland.

== Reception ==
Following the launch of Scotcast, Alison Rowat of The Herald stated that it was a “hit and miss”, describing its format as “being late to the party”.

== See also ==
- Newcast
- BBC Reporting Scotland: News at Seven
- The Sunday Show
