= James Cook (broadcaster) =

Scottish journalist

James Cook is a British journalist and broadcaster. He is currently Scotland Editor for BBC News and an occasional presenter of the BBC’s Newscast podcast.

Previously, he was Chief News Correspondent on the Nine nightly news programme on the BBC Scotland channel and, before that, Los Angeles Correspondent and Scotland Correspondent for the BBC.

== Career ==
Educated at Forfar Academy, Cook began his career at Radio Tay in Dundee where he first read the news at the age of 15. Since joining BBC Scotland in 1998, Cook has gone on to present many news and current affairs programmes including Good Morning Scotland and Reporting Scotland.

Cook covered the lead up to the 2014 Scottish Independence Referendum for the BBC News Channel and hosted various debates between Yes Scotland and Better Together.

Cook hosted "The Big, Big Debate" at the newly opened SSE Hydro in September 2014 in front of more than 5,000 16- to 17-year-old registered Scottish voters.

Cook became the correspondent for BBC Scotland in 2008, and he became the BBC's Los Angeles correspondent in the summer of 2015. He became the Chief News Correspondent for the Nine in early 2019, and in February 2022, he became the Chief Editor of BBC Scotland.

In August 2022, Scottish independence activists in Perth shouted at Cook, calling him pejorative terms such as "liar" and "scumbag rat". The activists were criticized by First Minister of Scotland Nicola Sturgeon and members of the BBC. Cook later responded by tweeting, "Since this incident I have heard from producers, camera crews and engineers about the escalating abuse they face simply for bringing you the news. It is fuelled by lies about our journalism designed to make money and to avoid scrutiny. It is unacceptable in a civilised society."
