= David Henderson (broadcaster) =

News broadcaster

David Henderson (born 1970) is a news correspondent and presenter with BBC Scotland news. He is BBC Scotland's business and transport correspondent for BBC Reporting Scotland, Good Morning Scotland, Newsnight Scotland, The Politics Show Scotland, Holyrood Live, Newsdrive and Scotland at 10.

He has acted as BBC Scotland's health correspondent as well as a former relief news anchor and is part of BBC Radio Scotland's commentary team for Scottish international cricket.

Since November 2023, Henderson is acting as one of BBC Scotland's Political correspondents.

== Education ==
Henderson was educated at Stewart's Melville College in Edinburgh, has an honours degree in Scots law from Aberdeen University and a diploma in legal practice. He also studied at Palermo University, Italy, under the Erasmus scheme. Before joining the BBC he was a lawyer, specialising in civil and criminal court work and also worked at the radio station Scot FM. Henderson has a postgraduate diploma in broadcast journalism from University of the West of Scotland and a particular interest in public law and human rights law. An experienced climber and hillwalker, Henderson has written for The Great Outdoors (TGO), and co-wrote Philip's Guide to Mountains (editor, Ingalo Thomson; general editor, Doug Scott).
