= Having It All =

Having It All may refer to:

- Having It All (musical), a 2011 American musical
- Having It All (radio programme), a 2007 radio drama series
- "Having It All" (Doctors), a 2004 television episode

== See also ==
- Have It All (disambiguation)
