= Nick Sheridan (journalist) =

Irish journalist and writer (1991–2024)

- Sheridan in 2014 as the host of News2day
- Born: Nicholas Sheridan; 30 October 1991; Wexford, Ireland
- Died: 6 March 2024 (aged 32); Glasgow, Scotland
- Education: Dublin City University
- Occupations: Journalist, presenter, writer
- Awards: Prix CIRCOM Regional Programme Award (2016)

Nicholas Sheridan (30 October 1991 – 6 March 2024) was an Irish journalist, television presenter and author who worked in the UK and Ireland.

== Early life and career ==
Nick Sheridan was born in Wexford on 30 October 1991. He attended St Peter's College, where he was involved with the school's musical productions and graduated as "Student of the Year" in 2010. Sheridan graduated from Dublin City University, majoring in journalism, and moved to Glasgow in 2017.

Sheridan worked in broadcasting for more than 10 years. He started his career at Newstalk as a newsreader and worked as a researcher at Late Lunch Live. In 2009, Sheridan was named Young Irish Filmmaker of the Year and travelled to South Korea for the Seoul International Film Festival. In 2016, he won the Prix CIRCOM Regional Rising Star Award. He presented and reported in RTE's News2day programme for two years before he moved to the UK in 2018 and joined the BBC in Glasgow.

In Glasgow, he was initially employed as a researcher with BBC Scotland. Sheridan later expanded into working as a camera journalist, correspondent and presenter. Sheridan presented programmes including Reporting Scotland, Drivetime, The Nine, Seven Days, Lunchtime Live, Good Morning Scotland, and The Sunday Show. He left working full time there to focus on writing children's books, but continued to work freelance for the BBC.

Sheridan also worked as a broadcast journalist at STV.

In 2021, he released his first book, Breaking News: How to tell what’s real from what’s rubbish. In 2022, he wrote the first book of a trilogy of books, entitled The Case of the Runaway Brain. The book was followed by its 2023 sequel, The Case of the Phantom Treasure. His final book, The Case of the Poisonous Pigs, was published in 2024. Sheridan was also a guest lecturer at the University of West Scotland.

== Personal life and death ==
Sheridan came out as gay at the age of 16.

He died in Glasgow on 6 March 2024, at the age of 32. Sheridan had suffered a brain aneurysm on 25 February and was put in an induced coma. A minute of silence was held for him at BBC Scotland offices. First Minister of Scotland Humza Yousaf paid tribute to Sheridan in the Scottish Parliament, describing him as an "extremely talented journalist and author". Sheridan's funeral was held in his home town of Castlebridge on 13 March.
