= Alan Douglas =

Alan or Allan Douglas may refer to:

- Alan Douglas (music producer) (1931–2014), American record producer
- Alan Douglas (journalist) (born 1951), Scottish journalist and former broadcaster
- Allan Douglas (cricketer, born 1958), Bermudian cricketer
- Allan Douglas (cricketer, born 1987), Bermudian cricketer
