= John Beattie (rugby union) =

Scotland international rugby union player

- Born: John Ross Beattie; 27 November 1957 (age 68) North Borneo
- Notable relative(s): Johnnie Beattie (son); Jen Beattie (daughter)

Rugby union career
- Position: Flanker / Number Eight
Amateur team(s)
Years	Team	Apps	(Points)
- Glasgow Academicals
- Heriot's
Provincial / State sides
Years	Team	Apps	(Points)
- Glasgow District
1986	Combined Scottish Districts		
International career
Years	Team	Apps	(Points)
1980	Scotland 'B'	2	
1980–1987	Scotland	25	(25)
1980, 1983, 1986	British Lions	2	

John Ross Beattie (born 27 November 1957) is a Scottish broadcaster and former rugby union player.

== Early life and education ==
Beattie was born to Scottish parents in North Borneo, where his father was manager of a rubber estate. He attended boarding school in Penang, Malaysia and the family returned to Scotland when he was eleven. and he went to the Glasgow Academy.

He studied at the University of Glasgow and gained a degree in Civil Engineering.

== Rugby union career ==
Beattie played for Glasgow Schools, Glasgow Academicals and Heriot's.

He played for Glasgow District.

He played for Combined Scottish Districts on 1 March 1986 against South of Scotland.

=== International career ===
He gained 2 caps for Scotland 'B' in 1980.

He won his first international cap for Scotland at No. 8 on 2 February 1980 against Ireland at Lansdowne Road at the age of 22. He went on to earn a total of 25 Scotland caps.

He toured twice with the British Lions, to South Africa in 1980 and New Zealand in 1983, winning one test cap. He also played for the Lions against 'the Rest' in 1986.

In 1987 he captained Scotland in a pre-season tour to Spain and later scored a try in both internationals against France and Wales.

His first try for Scotland came against France at the Parc des Princes on 7 March 1987. On 4 April he started a match against England but suffered a recurrence of a knee injury and was substituted early in the second half. The injury ruled him out of playing in the inaugural Rugby World Cup. He did not play for Scotland again and the knee injury cut short his playing career.

=== Coaching career ===
For a brief period, Beattie was assistant coach at Glasgow Academicals. Ahead of the 2004–05 season, Beattie was appointed as coach of Premier One side Biggar along with Gary Parker. He coached West of Scotland during their rise from Premier Division 3 to Division 1.

== Broadcasting and journalism career ==
After retiring from rugby, Beattie moved on from civil engineering and retrained as a chartered accountant, before moving into broadcasting in 1995.

He works as a commentator or presenter for rugby on television and radio. He hosts a lunchtime show of news, comment and discussion on BBC Radio Scotland, and is a host of the sports magazine programme Sport Nation on both radio and TV.

He writes a rugby blog on the BBC's rugby union website, and has written for The Herald, Sunday Herald and Scottish Rugby Magazine.

In 2003 Beattie was chairman of the Scottish government physical activity taskforce to improve the health of the nation through exercise and oversaw a review in 2008, 'Let's Make Scotland More Active'.

In 2010, Radio Scotland announced that he would host the "John Beattie Show", a 75-minute show four days a week.

Since 2019, Beattie serves as a presenter on BBC Scotland's news programme The Nine.

In 2024, he joined the news presenting team at BBC News Reporting Scotland as relief presenter.

== Personal life ==
Beattie's son, Johnnie, was also a rugby player who represented Scotland and won 38 caps between 2006 and 2015. One of his daughters, Jen, plays football for Scotland, having won more than 100 caps, and Arsenal and previously for Celtic F.C. Women.

In 2004, Beattie was a candidate for Rector of the University of Glasgow.

In 2015 Abertay University awarded him an honorary doctorate. He received another honorary doctorate from the University of Glasgow one year later.
