= Laura McGhie =

Scottish radio and tv presenter

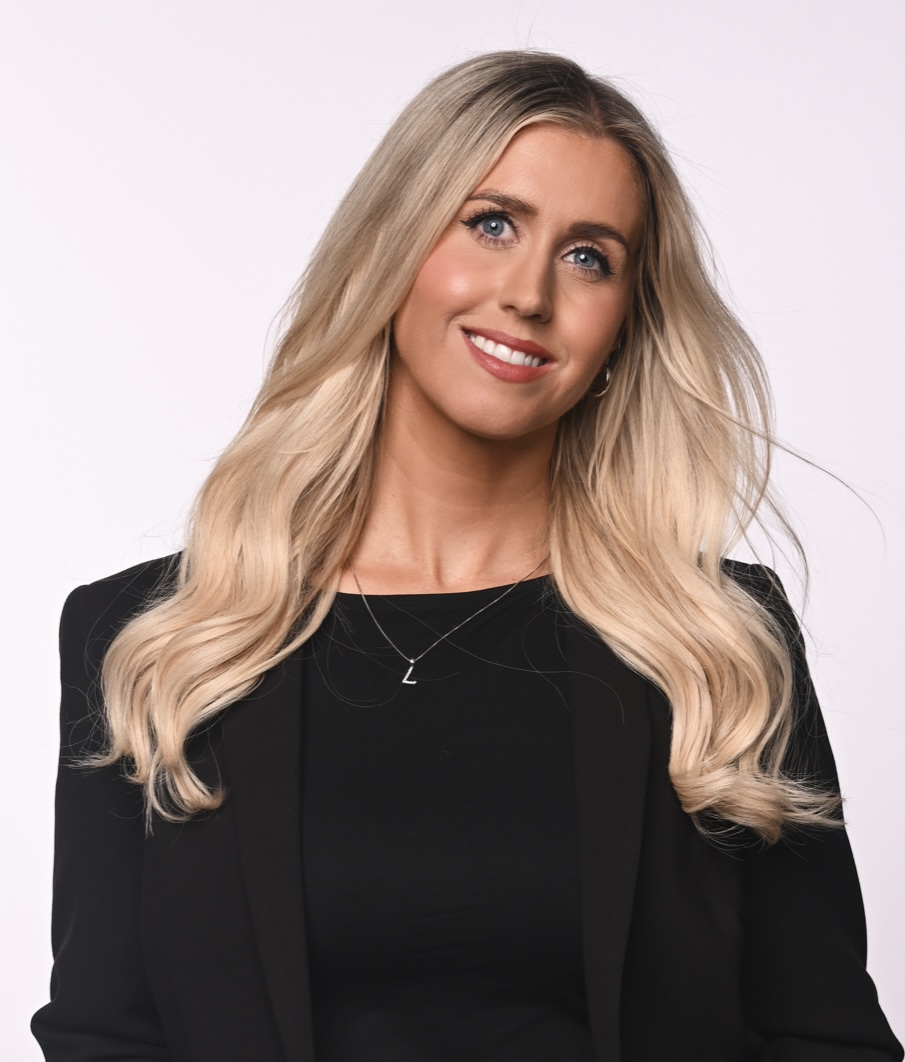
- Laura McGhie
- Born: Laura McGhie; 26 April 1990 (age 36); Edinburgh, Scotland
- Presenting career
- Show: ‘Laura McGhie’
- Station: BBC Radio 5 Live
- Network: BBC
- Time slot: 10:00pm-01:00am (Monday-Thursday)
- Style: Presenter, DJ
- Country: United Kingdom

Laura McGhie (born 26 April 1989) is a Scottish radio and television broadcaster, who presents on BBC Radio 5 Live

Laura presents weekday evenings on BBC Radio 5 Live, and also presents 5 Live Breakfast and 5 Live Drive, amongst other programmes, as a relief presenter.

McGhie was previously a sports news presenter on the BBC News channel and was one of the original sports news presenters on BBC Scotland's flagship news programme The Nine.

As a journalist, McGhie presents on BBC Radio Scotland and on Reporting Scotland, alongside making appearances on BBC Scotland's Sportscene, BBC Breakfast and BBC Olympic programming.

== Education and career ==
McGhie graduated with a (MA)Honours Degree in English Literature from the University of Glasgow, after completing a diploma in Music from the Edinburgh College. In 2012, McGhie worked for the BBC at the Edinburgh Festivals and shortly afterwards joined BBC Scotland. In 2015, she became a broadcast journalist at BBC Sport Scotland, reporting and covering domestic football and rugby. She also presented from the 2016 Gold Coast Commonwealth Games. McGhie co-presented the Rugby Breakfast Show that was shortlisted for an ARIAS award for Best Sport Programme.

McGhie was one of the original presenters on BBC Scotland's flagship news programme The Nine from 2019, as well as appearing on its sister shows The Edit and Seven Days. That year, McGhie began to present on BBC Radio 5Live programmes including Drive, Breakfast and Weekend Breakfast alongside Tony Livesey, Rick Edwards and Chris Warburton. She is also a relief presenter for Nicky Campbell, Colin Murray and Naga Munchetty's programmes on the station.

McGhie joined 5Live permanently in 2022 as overnight weekend presenter on Laura McGhie, replacing Hayley Hassell. At the same time she joined the BBC News channel as a sport presenter, fronting Sportsday and sports news bulletins. McGhie presented the 2024 Christmas special of the BBC Sounds Must Watch podcast.

In 2025, it was announced McGhie would return to BBC Radio 5Live as a presenter following maternity leave, joining Dotun Adebayo to overnight BBC Radio. She currently presents from Glasgow on Fridays, Saturdays and Sundays across the network.

== See also ==
- Up All Night (radio show)
- BBC Radio 5Live
- BBC News
- Sportscene
- BBC Radio Scotland
- BBC Radio
