= Scotland Decides: The Big, Big Debate =

- Presented by: James Cook
- Starring: Nicola Sturgeon; Patrick Harvie; Ruth Davidson; George Galloway
- Country of origin: Scotland
- Original language: English

Production
- Production locations: OVO Hydro, Glasgow, Scotland
- Running time: 60 minutes (approx.)
- Production companies: Mentorn, BBC Scotland

Original release
- Network: BBC One
- Release: 11 September 2014

Scotland Decides: The Big, Big Debate was a one-off Scottish television programme broadcast by the BBC on 11 September 2014, a week prior to the 2014 Scottish independence referendum. The 60-minute show was recorded at Glasgow's OVO Hydro during the afternoon prior to broadcast. It was presented by Scottish journalist James Cook before an audience of about 7,500 16- and 17-year-olds, first-time voters on the day of the referendum, some of whom were invited to quiz a panel of prominent politicians from both the "Yes" and "No" campaigns.

The audience included representatives from every secondary school in Scotland, while the panel was made up of Deputy First Minister Nicola Sturgeon and Scottish Green Party leader Patrick Harvie from the "Yes Scotland" campaign, and Scottish Conservative Party leader Ruth Davidson and Respect Party MP George Galloway representing the "Better Together" campaign.

== Background ==
Plans for a televised debate featuring an audience of Scotland's first-time voters were announced on 23 June, with BBC Scotland describing it as the UK's largest ever political debate involving an audience of 7,500. The 16 and 17-year-olds, who would be able to cast their vote for the first time at the forthcoming referendum, would be invited to the OVO Hydro, an arena in Glasgow, where they would have the opportunity to question a panel of senior politicians about Scottish independence. The panel's line-up would be confirmed at a later date. John Boothman, BBC Scotland's Head of News and Current Affairs, said "We are proud to bring the nation's young people together to hear the arguments that will determine the future of the country."

The panellists were confirmed on 11 September, but the show attracted controversy in the days preceding that announcement after a spokesman for George Galloway claimed that plans for the Respect Party MP, who represented the English constituency of Bradford West at the time, to appear as a representative for the "No" campaign had been vetoed by senior BBC management as they wanted only Scottish-based politicians; even though Galloway was born in Dundee, and had grown up in the city. The BBC rejected suggestions that such a decision had been made, and Galloway would go on to be one of the show's four panellists.

== The Debate ==
The debate was recorded at OVO Hydro on the afternoon of Thursday 11 September 2014, and broadcast during the evening on BBC One (earlier in Scotland). Presented by James Cook, the four members of the panel were Deputy First Minister Nicola Sturgeon and Scottish Green Party leader Patrick Harvie for the Yes campaign, and Scottish Conservative Party leader Ruth Davidson and Respect Party politician George Galloway for the No campaign. The audience was made up of 7,500 teenagers representing every secondary school in Scotland.

Julie McDowall of The Herald writes that the debate started off slowly, but came to life after twelve minutes when Galloway was asked a question about employment, but chose instead to speak about fiscal matters. Galloway was booed on several occasions. Much of the debate focused on topics relating to taxation, oil reserves, banking, poverty and how to protect NHS Scotland, over which there were some heated exchanges. McDowall also notes that some "comical directions from the stage" were required because of the venue's size. "James Cook had to call for questions from 'the man clapping with your hands in the air' or 'the boy pointing at your own head!'". Writing for The Times about the event 18 months later, Matt Chorley reflected that "The sight of" Galloway, "in his large black fedora telling the audience to ask their grandparents about the Nazis became one of the most memorable things about the evening".

== Reception ==
McDowall gives the debate a favourable review, expressing surprise at the topics raised by the teenage audience, which she had expected would be "different from the usual questions". She also questioned Galloway's headwear, remarking: "He was a ridiculous figure onstage. With his tilted trilby and microphone all he needed was a single sequined glove."

The Independent's Chris Green reported that the audience had become restless due to the length they were required to wait before the panelists appeared onstage. Encouraged to engage in social media while attending the debate, many used the opportunity to vent their frustration about the venue's lack of air conditioning and their increasing boredom. Green describes this as the debate's "most entertaining feature."
