= Stuart Graham =

Stuart Graham may refer to

- Stuart Graham (motorcyclist), British motorcycle road racer and saloon car racer
- Stuart Graham (actor), actor from Northern Ireland
- Stuart Clarence Graham, officer in the Australian Army

== See also ==
- Graham Stuart (disambiguation)
