= Zainab Boladale =

Nigerian-Irish television reporter

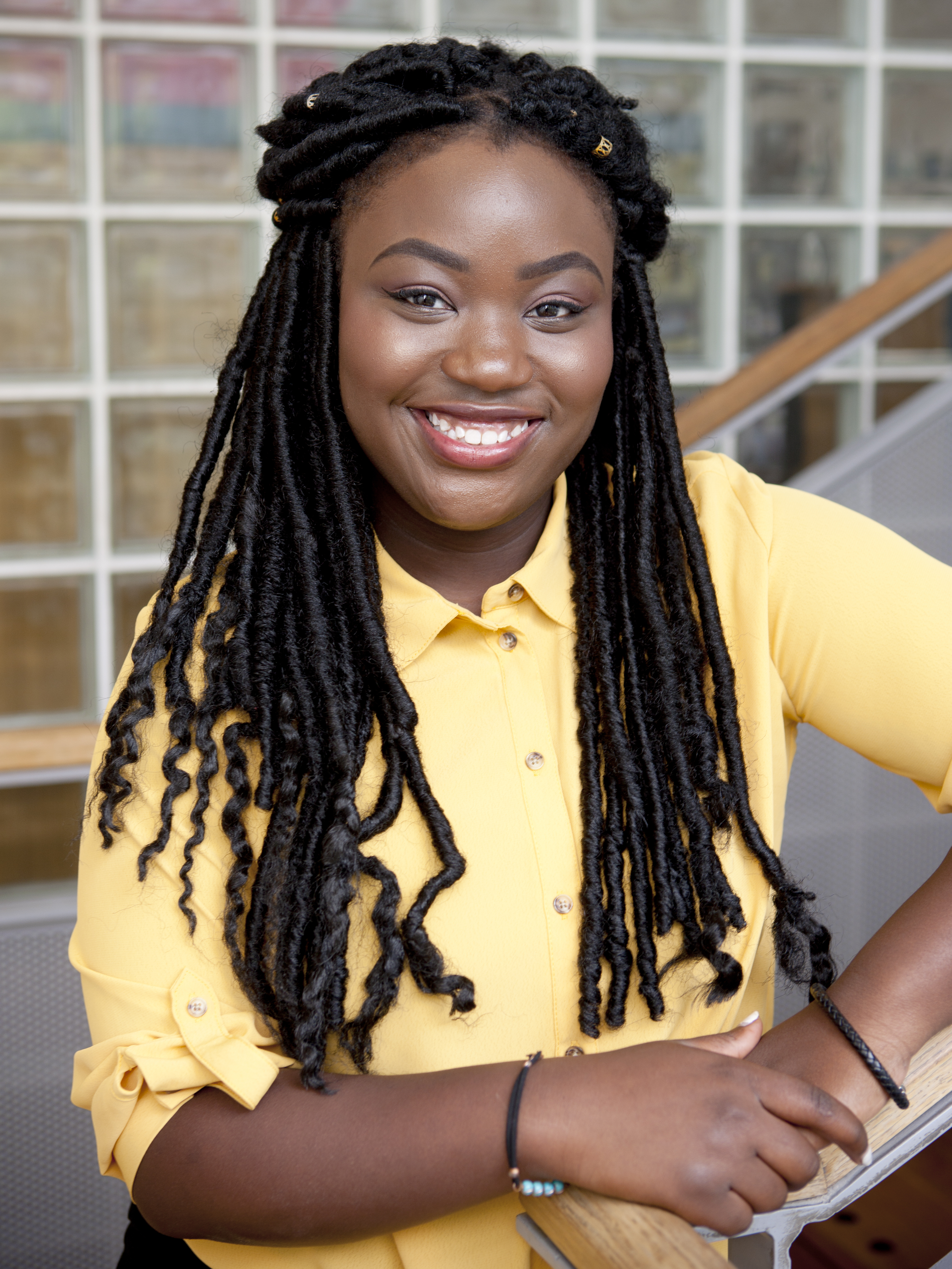
- Boladale in 2018
- Born: Lagos, Nigeria
- Years active: 2017–present
- Employer: RTÉ Television

Zainab Boladale is a Nigerian-Irish television presenter, reporter, public speaker and content creator. She was the first person of African heritage to work in the RTÉ newsroom.

== Career ==
Zainab Boladale's first job was at Irish Independent in 2017. She then went on to become one of the presenters of RTÉ Television's children's programme, news2day, the first person of African heritage to become a news anchor on RTÉ. She remained on that show from 2017 to 2019. From 2019, she moved to Nationwide.

Boladale has spoken about her experiences, receiving racist abuse after taking up her position in RTÉ. The majority of the abusive content came through a YouTube channel targeting her, and led to RTÉ calling on social media to take more action in tackling abusive channels. The channel was deactivated after the news coverage of Boladale's experiences.

Boladale was one of the featured speakers at the Beyond Representation in September 2019.

== Personal life ==
Boladale was born in Lagos, Nigeria, moving to Ennis, County Clare, Ireland with her mother and siblings at age 4. She has a younger brother and sister. She attended Scoil Chríost Rí, Cloughleigh and Gaelcholáiste an Chláir, Ennis. She is a fluent Irish speaker. She graduated with the BA in Journalism from Dublin City University in 2017. She won the 2017 DCU Hybrid Awards Journalist of the Year, and was nominated for U magazine’s 30 Under 30 Awards the same year.
