= Viv Lumsden =

Scottish television presenter (born 1952)

Vivien Dale Victoria Lumsden (born 22 November 1952 in Edinburgh) is a former television presenter. She was a newsreader on the Scottish TV (STV Central) news programme, Scotland Today for nine years. Before Scottish TV, she worked on BBC Scotland's Reporting Scotland from 1984 to 1989.

She co-presented The Home Show on STV with her husband Alan Douglas for six years and won a BAFTA for the Best Special Interest Programme in 1997.

She started her career at Radio Clyde, before working as an AA traffic reporter, and then joining the BBC as a Breakfast Time newsreader.

Lumsden also fronted coverage of the Glasgow Garden Festival in 1988 for BBC Scotland and was the host who read out the Scottish votes for the BBC Song For Europe 1985 from the old BBC studios in Glasgow.

During the early 1990s, she presented her own chat show, Viv on Sunday.

A director of Saga Radio in Glasgow until it was bought over to become Smooth FM, Lumsden is on the board of the Prince and Princess of Wales Hospice in the city. She was restaurant critic for Scottish Field magazine, and occasionally writes and broadcasts on aspects of the hospitality industry, travel and home style and design.

== Education ==
Lumsden attended James Gillespie's High School in Edinburgh, followed by the Royal Scottish Academy of Music and Drama.

She then entered teacher training, qualifying as a speech and drama teacher. However, during her training, she became interested in radio and took up a job at Radio Clyde.

== Personal life ==
Lumsden has an adult son and daughter and two granddaughters. Her daughter Victoria, is a BBC Radio Scotland travel news presenter. Her husband is former BBC Scotland presenter Alan Douglas.

== Sources ==
- Who's who in Scotland 2003. Kilmarnock: Carrick Media. 2003. ISBN 978-0-946724-52-9.
