= Penny Macmillan =

British journalist

Penny Macmillan is a British Journalist, local radio news producer and presenter and former TV news presenter on BBC Reporting Scotland .She was a familiar face on Breakfast, Weekends and at 22:25. Before her departure from TV News in 2007 to spend time with her young family, she co-presented the flagship programme at 18:30. Penny joined BBC Scotland to present Newsline on BBC Choice Scotland in 1998. Previously, Penny reported and produced for Lookaround at Border Television.
