= Graham Stuart =

Graham Stuart may refer to:

- Graham Stuart (politician) (born 1962), British Conservative Party politician
- Graham Stuart (footballer) (born 1970), English former footballer

== See also ==
- Graham Stewart (born 1975), Scottish broadcaster
