= Mary Marquis =

Scottish journalist and newscaster (born 1934)

Mary Elizabeth Marquis MBE (née Caughie; born 11 March 1934) is a former leading interviewer and presenter on BBC Scotland from the mid-1960s, and became the face of the network's evening news programme Reporting Scotland until 1988, including the whole of the 1970s Nationwide era when input from BBC broadcasters based at the corporation's other studios around the UK contributed to a national programme.

== Early life ==
Marquis was born in Glasgow. She trained at the Royal Scottish Academy of Music and Drama in Glasgow.

== Career ==
Marquis joined Border TV as an in-vision continuity announcer and presenter in 1961. She was the first person seen on screen, opening the station's transmission in September 1961.

Two years later, she moved to BBC Scotland. She travelled all over Scotland to interview people for A Quick Look Round (and later for her own series First Person Singular from 1970 – 75). She became one of the three lead presenters of Reporting Scotland at its inception in 1968, and subsequently, the programme's main anchor for most of the next twenty years. With the start of Nationwide in 1969, she became a frequent face on television across the whole of the UK.

Marquis left Reporting Scotland to become one of the first presenters of Good Morning Scotland and stand-in as anchor of BBC Radio 4's Today programme. She later returned to television news at BBC Scotland in September 1975, continuing as anchor of Reporting Scotland until her departure from the BBC in 1988.

She has subsequently been involved with various arts, medical and academic organisations. She also did a series of live interviews at the Edinburgh Festival.

Marquis was appointed Member of the Order of the British Empire in the 1983 New Year Honours list, and honoured with a special award for 'Special Contribution to Scottish Broadcasting' at the 2007 Scottish BAFTA awards.

RCS awards an annual Mary Marquis prize for student performance in television, commemorating her time there.

== Personal life ==
In 1962, Marquis married Jack Anderson, a Glasgow (subsequently also Canada and London)-based architect and lecturer, and a son David was born two years later. Although expecting to be dismissed, she continued to appear on screen almost until the birth (including one interview conducted on a roof), and was back in the studio afterwards within six weeks.
