= Have It All =

Have It All may refer to:

- Have It All (A. J. McLean album), 2010
- Have It All (Bethel Music album), 2016
  - "Have It All" (Bethel Music and Brian Johnson song), 2016
- Have It All (Jesse McCartney album), 2010
- "Have It All" (Foo Fighters song), 2003
- Have It All, album by Planningtorock, 2006
- "Have It All" (Jason Mraz song), 2018
- "Have It All", song by Magic! from Primary Colours, 2016

== See also ==
- Having It All (disambiguation)
