= Steven Mill =

Scottish radio presenter and sports broadcaster

- Born: July 1989 (age 36); Dunfermline, Scotland
- Occupation: Radio presenter

Steven Mill (born July 1989) is a Scottish radio presenter and broadcaster known for his work on commercial radio stations across Scotland, including Clyde 1, Capital Scotland and Forth 1.

He has presented music, entertainment and sports programming and is particularly associated with Scottish football broadcasting.

Mill also presents The Saturday Show on BBC Radio Scotland alongside Amy Irons.

== Career ==
Mill began his broadcasting career in Scottish commercial radio and later became a presenter on Capital Scotland, where he co-hosted the station's breakfast programme alongside Des Clarke and Amy Irons.

He subsequently joined Bauer Media's Scottish radio network, presenting programmes across several stations including Clyde 1. In 2020, he became one of the presenters of The Big Saturday Football Show, a sports and entertainment programme broadcast across a number of Bauer-owned stations in Scotland. The programme was co-hosted with Ewen Cameron and combined football discussion, music and listener interaction.

Mill has also been associated with football broadcasting through The Big Scottish Football Podcast, which he hosts alongside former footballer and pundit Gordon Dalziel.

In addition to sports programming, Mill has presented mainstream music and drivetime shows on Scottish commercial radio. Bauer Media expanded several Scottish networked programmes in 2020 and 2021, with Mill becoming a prominent voice across multiple stations in the group's Scottish portfolio.

As of 2026, Mill presents across Bauer's Scotland network primarily with Gary Spence. He also co-presents The Saturday Show on BBC Radio Scotland alongside Amy Irons.

In May the BBC announced Mill would be presenting special editions of The Saturday Show at the World Cup from Boston, for the duration of Scotland's 2026 World Cup campaign.
