= Abeer Macintyre =

British journalist, broadcaster, charity worker

- Born: Abeer Zahran; 1964 (age 61–62); Amman, Jordan
- Education: University of Kent, BA
- Occupations: Journalist, presenter, newsreader, charity worker
- Notable credit(s): Reporting Scotland; Good Morning Scotland; Newsnight Scotland; Frontline Scotland
- Spouse: Kenny Macintyre
- Children: 3

Abeer Macintyre (née Zahran; Arabic: عبير زهران; born December 1964) is the managing director of specialist voluntary sector agency BTA (Bruce Tait Associates). She joined the company in 2015 following previous successful roles at several children's charities.

Abeer joined the voluntary sector after a career in broadcasting and was formerly a regular presenter and journalist at BBC Scotland from 1994 to 2009, presenting the station's flagship radio programme Good Morning Scotland and as a presenter of the station's news and political TV broadcasts.

== Early life ==
Abeer Macintyre was born in Amman, Jordan, in December 1964 to a Jordanian father and Irish mother. She spent the first five years of her life living in Beirut, Lebanon, before moving to Belfast, Northern Ireland, with her mother and two sisters after her parents separated. She studied English and Drama at the University of Kent, graduating in 1987.

== Career in TV and radio ==
At BBC Scotland she presented Good Morning Scotland, the station's flagship breakfast programme. She continued in this role for fifteen years, while also working on televised news and politics programmes, including Reporting Scotland, Frontline Scotland and Newsnight Scotland.

== Charity career ==
In 2009, Macintyre left BBC Scotland to become Head of Supporter Care at Mary's Meals. She then joined NSPCC Scotland as Strategic Head of Fundraising and then became Director of Development at Children in Scotland.
