= BBC Reporting Scotland =

BBC television news programme for Scotland

- Title card used since June 2023
- Theme music composer: David Lowe
- Country of origin: Scotland
- Original language: English

Production
- Producers: BBC News; BBC Scotland
- Production locations: Studio C, BBC Pacific Quay, Glasgow
- Camera setup: Multi-camera
- Running time: 30 minutes (main 6:30 pm programme); 10 minutes (1:30 pm and 10:30 pm programmes); Various (on weekends and Breakfast)

Original release
- Network: BBC One Scotland
- Release: 1 April 1968 – present

Related
- BBC Reporting Scotland: News at Seven; An Là; The Sunday Show

BBC Reporting Scotland is the BBC's main national television news programme for Scotland, broadcast on BBC One Scotland from the headquarters of BBC Scotland in Pacific Quay, Glasgow. It is accompanied by a 7:00 pm edition of the programme broadcast on the BBC Scotland channel.

Since May 2025, Reporting Scotland has been mainly presented by Scottish journalists Laura Miller and Laura Goodwin.

== History ==
Although BBC Television was established in Scotland in February 1952 – and broadcast some opt-out programming – it did not start its daily Scottish television news service until Friday 30 August 1957, initially consisting of a five-minute bulletin at 6.05 pm on weekdays and a sports results programme on Saturdays. The BBC was keen to launch the Scottish News Summary ahead of its new commercial rival in the central belt, Scottish Television (STV) and before the launch of similar bulletins elsewhere in the UK. As it turned out, STV began broadcasting the day after the launch of what was the BBC's first opt-out TV news bulletin, with the commercial rival launching its local bulletins the following Monday. Similar five-minute bulletins were introduced to the rest of the UK the following month. Topical magazine programmes were later introduced to supplement the Scottish news bulletins including Six Ten, Scotland at Six, A Quick Look Round, and a weekly regional opt-out programme for the North of Scotland entitled Talk of the North.

Following the arrival of future director-general Alasdair Milne as controller of BBC Scotland, BBC Reporting Scotland was launched on Monday 1 April 1968 with a greater emphasis on hard news coverage. Inspired by the format of NBC's The Huntley-Brinkley Report in the United States, the programme was presented jointly from the BBC's studios in Glasgow, Edinburgh and Aberdeen.

The original team of presenters were former A Quick Look Round presenter Mary Marquis (Glasgow), news agency journalist Gordon Smith (Edinburgh) and ex-Grampian Television announcer Douglas Kynoch (Aberdeen). Kynoch later became the main anchor in Glasgow while future Pebble Mill at One host Donny MacLeod took over as the Aberdeen presenter. In Edinburgh, later presenters included Renton Laidlaw (later a veteran golf commentator) and Kenneth Roy.

In September 1969, BBC Reporting Scotland was integrated into the networked Nationwide strand. As with their counterparts in the other BBC Nations and Regions, BBC Reporting Scotland team often contributed reports to the Nationwide programme. When Nationwide ended in August 1983, BBC Reporting Scotland was briefly replaced by Scotland Sixty Minutes as part of the revamped news programme, Sixty Minutes, but was reinstated in 1984 after Sixty Minutes ended. Since that time, the BBC Reporting Scotland brand has also been used as the on-screen identity for most of BBC Scotland's television news bulletins.

Arguably the most famous ex-presenter was Mary Marquis, who upon her return in September 1975, became its main anchor until her departure in 1988. Regular co-presenters included John Milne - who remained with the BBC for many years - Malcolm Wilson, Viv Lumsden, Alan Douglas and Eddie Mair.

Jackie Bird became the programme's longest serving presenter, anchoring the main 6.30 pm edition of Reporting Scotland for nearly thirty years until her sudden departure in April 2019. Long-serving BBC Scotland sports commentator Archie Macpherson also established the programme's weekend sports previews on Friday nights.

In-depth weather forecasts were introduced as part of a major relaunch of the programme in October 1992, initially fronted by Vanessa Collingridge, and later, the popular Heather Reid (aka Heather the Weather) who stayed with Reporting Scotland for fifteen years. The programme also increased its use of live outside broadcasts and satellite links for news reports and interviews.

The viewing figures for the main 6.30 pm programme averaged between 500,000 and 600,000 and have occasionally reached a million, including the night after the Lockerbie disaster in December 1988. In March 1996, part of the programme was shown on BBC1 across the UK following the Dunblane massacre. Occasional special editions, marking major news events, have also aired on the BBC News Channel and BBC Parliament.

BBC Scotland moved to BBC Pacific Quay in 2007. Reporting Scotland's first transmission from the new studios was a breakfast bulletin presented by Rob Matheson, transmitted at 6.25 am on Monday 20 August 2007. The studio backdrop featured a live view from cameras mounted on the roof of BBC Scotland's new headquarters on the southern banks of the Clyde. When it opened, the new building at Pacific Quay was one of the most up-to-date digital broadcasting facilities in the world and featured the BBC's first HD-capable newsroom. Since 4 October 1999, the programme's on-air titles and graphics have reflected the corporate branding of BBC News, including the signature theme tune composed by David Lowe.

During the 1970s and early 1980s, BBC Reporting Scotland used extracts from both commercial chart songs and library music for signature tunes, such as the Donna Summer cover of MacArthur Park, Jeff Wayne's Jubilation (also used by LWT's The Big Match) and Emerson, Lake & Palmer's version of Fanfare for the Common Man.

Reporting Scotland's on-air look was most recently updated when a new revamped set was built in Studio C at BBC Scotland's Pacific Quay studios, reflecting the new look of the BBC's News at One, Six and Ten. It was first seen on screen on 12 June 2023.

Between 2019 and 2024, BBC Reporting Scotland had been supplemented by a sister hour-long programme, The Nine, which aired each weeknight on the BBC Scotland channel. While Reporting Scotland continued to cover Scottish news, The Nine's brief also included UK national and international news coverage from a Scottish perspective. The programme has been compared with the frequent calls to replace Reporting Scotland with a 'Scottish Six' version of the BBC News at Six.

On 9 December 2024, BBC News Scotland announced two new titles which will join its news and current affairs portfolio from the New Year. Launched on 6 January 2025 was Reporting Scotland: News at Seven, the new-look 30-minute week-night news programme for the BBC Scotland channel replacing The Nine. It is presented by Laura Maciver and Amy Irons - sharing days throughout the week, while Martin Geissler fronts a new current affairs podcast series Scotcast in which began a week later on 13 January.

On 30 January 2025, BBC Scotland announced that Sally Magnusson was to leave the programme after 27 years. She would continue to present until April and then work with the BBC as a freelance broadcaster. Magnusson's last programme was broadcast on 4 April. On 30 April, BBC Scotland announced that Laura Goodwin will be appointed as the new lead presenter on Thursdays and Fridays beginning in May.

== Broadcasting ==
On weekdays, the programme airs nine times a day on BBC One Scotland:

- Breakfast bulletins at 6:25, 6:55, 7:25, 7:55, 8:25 and 9:15 am during BBC Breakfast
- A 10-minute lunchtime programme at 1.35 pm, during the BBC News at One
- A short 30 second preview is aired at 5.15 pm before the main 30-minute evening programme at 6.30 pm, after the BBC News at Six
- A 30-minute 'Reporting Scotland: News at Seven' programme at 7 pm on the BBC Scotland channel
- A 10-minute late night bulletin at around 10.30 pm, after the BBC News at Ten

There are three weekend bulletins (one bulletin on a Saturday and two bulletins on a Sunday)

Along with other BBC Scotland news and current affairs programming, it can be viewed as a live or on-demand (in full or as individual articles) video stream from the online BBC iPlayer.

The programme can also be watched in any part of the UK (and much of Europe) via the BBC UK regional TV on satellite service transmitted from the Astra satellite

- on channel 101 using Sky-branded proprietary satellite receivers with a conditional access card associated with an address in Scotland
- on channel 951 using a Sky-branded receiver with a card associated with a non‑Scottish address or with no viewing card

Its main competitors are STV's main evening programme STV News in the North and Central of Scotland and ITV Border's main evening programme ITV News Lookaround in the South of Scotland.

== Presenting team ==
News
Person	Position	Days
Laura Miller	Main presenters (6:30 pm)	Monday-Wednesday
Laura Goodwin	Main presenters (6:30 pm)	Thursday-Friday
Sarah McMullan	Breakfast and Lunchtime presenter	Weekdays
Rebecca Curran	6:30pm relief presenter	Weekdays only
Graham Stewart	Relief (Stand-in) presenters	Weekdays and Weekends
Amy Irons	Relief (Stand-in) presenters	Weekdays and Weekends
Suzanne Allan	Relief (Stand-in) presenters	Weekdays and Weekends
Andrew Black	Relief (Stand-in) presenters	Weekdays and Weekends
Lucy Whyte	Relief (Stand-in) presenters	Weekdays and Weekends
Halla Mohieddeen	Relief (Stand-in) presenters	Weekdays and Weekends
Caitlin Hutchison	Relief (Stand-in) presenters	Weekdays and Weekends
Ben Philip	Relief (Stand-in) presenters	Weekdays and Weekends
Karen Elder	Relief (Stand-in) presenters	Weekdays and Weekends
Laura McGhie	Relief (Stand-in) presenters	Weekdays and Weekends
Fiona Stalker	Relief (Stand-in) presenters	Weekdays and Weekends
Louise Cowie	Relief (Stand-in) presenters	Weekdays and Weekends

Weather
Person	Position
Christopher Blanchett	Main presenters
Judith Ralston	Main presenters
Gillian Smart	Main presenters
Kirsteen MacDonald	Main presenters
Joy Dunlop	Relief presenters
Calum MacColl	Relief presenters
Derek MacIntosh	Relief presenters
Sarah Cruickshank	Relief presenters
Kirsty McCabe	Relief presenters

Sport
Person	Position
Lewis Irons	Main presenters
Sheelagh McLaren	Main presenters
Jane Lewis	Relief presenters
Laura McGhie	Relief presenters
Kenny Crawford	Relief presenters
Martin Dougan	Relief presenters
Paul Barnes	Relief presenters

== News editors, reporters and correspondents ==
=== News editors ===
- James Cook – Scotland editor
- Glenn Campbell – Political editor
- Douglas Fraser – Business and Economics editor

=== Regional reporters ===
- Rebecca Curran – Aberdeen reporter
- Louise Hosie – Aberdeenshire reporter
- Morag Kinniburgh – Edinburgh reporter
- David Delday – Orkney reporter
- John Johnston – Shetland reporter
- Cameron Buttle – Scottish Borders reporter
- Graeme Ogston – Dundee reporter

=== News reporters ===
- Jamie McIvor – News correspondent
- Steven Godden
- Hope Webb
- Katie Hunter
- Catriona Renton
- Gillian Sharpe
- Ben Philip
- Richard Forbes
- Joanne Macaulay
- Ian Hamilton
- Phil McDonald
- Selena Jackson
- Andrew Thomson
- Sarah Toom
- Hazel Martin
- Andrew Picken
- Eilidh Davies
- Louise Cowie
- Suzanne Allan
- James Cheyne

=== Political correspondents ===
- Lynsey Bews
- Andrew Kerr
- David Wallace Lockhart
- Kirsten Campbell
- Phil Sim
- Jenni Davidson – Political reporter

=== Westminster correspondents ===
- Rajdeep Sandhu
- Paris Gourtsoyannis

=== Correspondents of different specialties ===
- David Henderson – Business and Transport correspondent
- Lisa Summers – Health correspondent
- David Cowan – Home affairs correspondent
- Chris Clements – Social affairs correspondent
- Lucy Adams – Education correspondent
- Kevin Keane – Environment, Energy and Rural affairs correspondent
- Pauline McLean – Arts correspondent
- Mark Daly – Investigations correspondent
- Chris McLaughlin – Sports news correspondent

=== Sport reporters ===
- Paul Barnes
- Lewis Irons
- Andy Burke
- Jane Lewis
- Sheelagh McLaren
- Kheredine Idessane
- Brian McLaughlin
- Tyrone Smith
- Kenny Crawford
- Martin Dowden

== Former presenters and reporters ==
- Abeer MacIntyre (2001–2008)
- Alan Douglas (1978–1996)
- Alan Mackay (1980s–2007)
- Allan Robb (1993–1994)
- Alma Cadzow (1980–1988)
- Alasdair Fraser (now with BBC Alba - BBC Gaelic Commissioning)
- Alastair Alexander (late 1960s - early 1970s)
- Alison Walker (2003–2009)
- Anne McAlpine (now with BBC Alba)
- Andrew Anderson (1997–2022)
- Andrew Kerr (as Relief presenter)
- Anne MacKenzie (1995–1997)
- Archie Macpherson
- Bill Hamilton (1973–1974)
- Bill McFarlan (1985–1992)
- Brenda Paterson
- Brian Marjoribanks (late 1960s - early 1970s)
- Brian Taylor - political editor (1985–2020)
- Brian Townsend (1973)
- Campbell Barclay (1976–1982)
- Carla Romano (late 1990s - early 2000s)
- Cat Cubie (weather presenter)
- Cathy MacDonald (1988–1989) (now with BBC ALBA, BBC Radio nan Gàidheal and BBC Radio Scotland)
- Catriona Shearer (2004–2021)
- Charles Munro (late 1960s - early 1970s)
- Chick Young (now with BBC Radio Scotland)
- Connor Gillies (2018–2022) (now with Sky News)
- Craig Anderson
- David Currie (now with BBC Sport Scotland)
- David Henderson (as Relief presenter)
- David Porter (Westminster correspondent, 1997–2025)
- David Robertson (2000–2008)
- David Shanks (2018–2023)
- Donny MacLeod
- Douglas Kynoch (1968–1973)
- Dougie Donnelly
- Dougie Vipond (now with Landward)
- Eddie Mair (1990–1993) (now with LBC)
- Eleanor Bradford (health correspondent 2001–2016)
- Emma Cameron (now with STV News)
- Eric Crockhart
- Fiona Henderson
- Forbes McFall
- Gail McGrane (weather presenter 2009–2011, 2018–2020, now with STV News)
- Georgia Roberts (Political correspondent 2023–2024, now with BBC East Midlands Today)
- Gerry Davis (1973–1975)
- Glen Gibson (late 1960s - early 1970s)
- Gordon Hewitt (mid-1970s - mid-1980s)
- Gordon Smith
- Hamish Neal
- Hazel Irvine (now with BBC Sport)
- Heather Reid (1994–2009, now working in academia)
- Iain Macinnes (2018–2025, now with BBC Alba)
- Jackie Bird (1989–2019, works elsewhere in BBC)
- Jane Franchi (1979–2003)
- James Cook (now with BBC News)
- John Duncanson
- John MacKay (1987–1994)
- John Milne (1972–2007)
- Jonathan Sutherland (now with BBC Sport Scotland)
- Kawser Quamer (weather presenter 2016–2023, now with BBC London)
- Kenneth Roy
- Kirsty Wark (1981–1989, now with Newsnight)
- Laura Maciver (now with BBC Radio Scotland)
- Lindsay Monarch (late 1990s)
- Louise Batchelor (1980s - 1989; 1994–2008)
- Louise Tait
- Louise Welsh
- Louise White (mid-1990s)
- Malcolm Wilson
- Mary Marquis (1968–1988)
- Neil Mudie (1977–1997)
- Nick Sheridan (2020–2024)
- Oliver Wright (now with STV News)
- Paddy Christie
- Penny Macmillan (1998–2007)
- Peter MacRae
- Renton Laidlaw (1970–1973)
- Rhona McLeod (1995–2019)
- Rob Maclean (now with BBC Sport Scotland and BT Sport)
- Rob Matheson (1998–2011, now with Al Jazeera English)
- Sally Magnusson (1997–2025, now working elsewhere in BBC)
- Sally McNair (1990–2021)
- Séan O'Neil (2022–2024, now with The Courier)
- Stav Danaos (weather presenter 2011–2013, now with BBC Weather)
- Vanessa Collingridge
- Viv Lumsden (1984–1989)
