= Rebecca Curran =

Scottish journalist and presenter

- Born: Aberdeen, Scotland
- Occupation: Journalist

Rebecca Curran is a Scottish journalist and presenter. As of 2019, she co-hosted the daily news programme The Nine on BBC Scotland.

She began her career at Northsound Radio in Aberdeen then worked for three years at STV before joining the BBC's Aberdeen newsroom as a senior broadcast journalist in December 2016.

Curran was appointed co-presenter of the daily 9.00pm news programme The Nine on the newly created BBC Scotland channel along with Martin Geissler in July 2018 with the channel launching on 24 February 2019.
