= Having It All (radio programme) =

Having it all is a five-episode 2007 radio drama series on BBC Radio Scotland written by Jackie Bird and produced by The Comedy Unit.

== Plot ==
The plot of "having it all" revolves around Debbie (Michelle Gomez), her family - her teenage daughter named Lucy (Ellie Bird) and her ten-year-old son Oliver (Michael Kelly), and her friends - Janice (Cora Bissett) and Martin (Mark Cox).

== Cast ==
- Debbie - Michelle Gomez
- Janice - Cora Bissett
- Lucy - Ellie Bird
- Oliver - Michael Kelly
- Multiple Roles - Mark Cox
- Jim - Gavin Mitchell
- Elsa- Julie Austin
