= Andrew Kerr (broadcaster) =

Scottish journalist and broadcaster

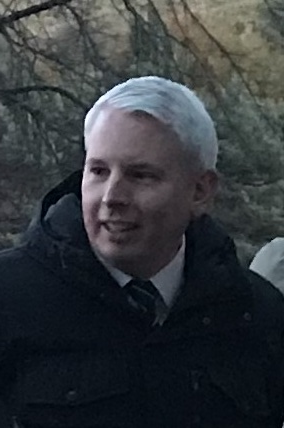
- Kerr in 2023
- Born: Edinburgh, Scotland, UK
- Education: University of Aberdeen University of Strathclyde
- Occupations: BBC journalist Writer; Television presenter
- Notable credit: Sunday Politics (Scotland)

Andrew Kerr is a Scottish journalist and broadcaster who works for BBC Scotland. Kerr is currently a political correspondent and presenter and presents and reports across a variety of different BBC Scotland radio and television programmes. On television, he has anchored both BBC Reporting Scotland and Scotland 2015. On BBC Radio Scotland, he has presented Good Morning Scotland and Newsdrive. He has also presented on the Scottish edition of Sunday Politics, Newsnight Scotland and Politics Scotland.

== Career ==
After graduating from Aberdeen University in 1999, with a degree in politics and international relations, he completed a postgraduate degree in journalism at Strathclyde University and joined Grampian Television (now STV North) in June 2000, primarily as a reporter for the flagship regional news programme North Tonight and supplementary Grampian Headlines/Grampian News bulletins.

Kerr joined BBC Scotland in 2006, working as a producer, reporter and presenter for television and radio. He later joined Sunday Politics Scotland, Scotland's main political analysis show and is the Scottish format of Daily Politics.

Kerr anchored BBC Scotland's live television coverage of the resignation of Scotland's First Minister, Alex Salmond, on 19 September 2014.

While his main role is currently as a Political Correspondent for BBC Scotland, on television, he regularly anchors BBC Reporting Scotland and Scotland 2015. On radio, he can often be heard presenting Good Morning Scotland and Newsdrive. He has also presented on the Scottish edition of Sunday Politics, Newsnight Scotland and Politics Scotland.
