= News2day =

news2day
- Presented by: Cathal Dowd/Florence Okojie
- Country of origin: Ireland
- Original language: English

Production
- Production locations: Studio 3, RTÉ Television Centre, Donnybrook, Dublin 4
- Camera setup: Single-Camera
- Running time: 10 – 15 minutes
- Production company: RTÉ Studios

Original release
- Network: RTÉ2
- Release: 2003 – present

news2day is an Irish children's television news programme, broadcast weekdays at 4:20pm on RTÉ Kids on RTÉ2. It is 10 to 15 minutes long, with 15 minute recap episodes on Saturdays. It is similar in format to the BBC's Newsround. It is currently presented by Cathal Dowd and Florence Okojie.

== Format ==
The programme is aimed at children between the ages of six and twelve, and is presented in a child-friendly manner, making it easy for children to understand and to gain an interest in the news. They present various topics, which include news, sports, entertainment and lifestyle.

In February 2009, to coincide with RTÉ News and Current Affairs receiving a major revamp of a new studio and set, news2day, also received a revamp, with a new computer generated background, new logo, titles, and theme music and also received a new site when RTÉ rebranded The Den to TRTÉ.

== History ==
Each presenter is given a two-year stint at the job. In total, 19 presenters have presented the show as of 2024.

news2day was first presented by Ailbhe Conneely (2003–2004) and Cathal Murray (2003). Conneely has since become a journalist with RTÉ News and Murray presents a late night show on RTÉ Radio 1.

The next presenters were Paul O'Flynn (2004–2005) and Sabrina Phelan (2004–2006). O'Flynn now works as a reporter with RTÉ Sport and Phelan is a trainer with Dog Training Ireland.

Then there was Paddy McKenna (2005–2007) who now co-presents RTÉ 2fm's Weekenders with Ruth Scott on RTÉ 2fm. Helen Joyce later joined him (2006–2008), and Stephen Carroll (2007–2008) later joined her. Joyce is a journalist with the BBC and Carroll is a journalist working as a Business Editor for France 24 and a freelance journalist for RTÉ Radio.

After that came Aisling Riordan (2008–2010), now a reporter with RTÉ's Morning Edition. Stephen O'Shea (2008–2010), presented with her. O'Shea works with a Government Minister. Yvonne Redmond (2010–2011) came along then; she is now Communications Executive with Agri Award. Aidan Kelly (2010–2012) later joined her then left to become a journalist with Worldirish.com.

Then came Nick Sheridan (2014 – 2016), who went onto work in the BBC Scotland newsroom, before dying in March 2024 after a short illness. Zainab Boladale joined the newsroom in 2017 presenting alongside Cillian Sherlock, becoming the first person of African descent to become a news anchor on RTÉ television, leaving in 2019 to join Nationwide.

Aisling Moloney joined the newsroom in 2019, presenting alongside Sherlock.

Mícheál Ó Scannáil joined in August 2020, replacing Sherlock. He was then joined by Reem El-Hassany, who joined the team in 2021. She is the first presenter of Arab descent to join the newsroom. Molly O'Connor joined the presenting team in 2022, replacing Ó Scannáil. El-Hassany left the programme in June 2023, with Barry Gallagher joining the presenting team in September 2023. O'Connor departed the programme in 2024, with Florence Okojie joining the team. Cathal Dowd joined the team in 2025, replacing Gallagher, who went onto become a reporter for RTÉ News.
