= Lucy Whyte =

Scottish broadcast journalist

- Born: October 2, 1984 (age 42)
- Presenting career
- Show: Reporting Scotland
- Station: BBC Reporting Scotland
- Network: BBC
- Time slot: 1830-1900
- Style: Education Correspondent
- Country: Scotland

Lucy J Whyte (born 2 October 1984) is a Scottish broadcast journalist, currently working for BBC Radio Scotland and Reporting Scotland.

== Education and career ==
Whyte graduated in 2008 with a 2:1 Honours Degree in English literature from the University of St Andrews, followed by a diploma in broadcast journalism from the University of the West of Scotland in 2008. Shortly afterwards, she joined Bauer Radio station Radio Clyde, working as a journalist there for 4 years.

In March 2012, she became a production and broadcast journalist for STV News, based in Glasgow, reporting and sometimes presenting bulletins on the main STV channel, as well as City channels STV Glasgow and STV Edinburgh. She occasionally appeared as anchor on the West edition of the STV News at Six.

From May 2016, covered maternity leave, as acting main anchor of the East edition of the STV News at Six based in Edinburgh. This ended on 21 April 2017 before she finally left STV altogether a week later to join BBC Scotland. She filled in as a relief presenter on Good Morning Scotland until it came to an end in November 2025.
