= BBC Scotland's Hogmanay =

UK television program

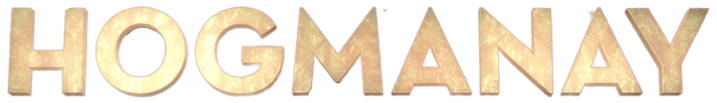
- Also known as: Hogmanay Live (1991–2018); Hogmanay (2019–present)
- Genre: New Year's television special
- Created by: BBC Scotland
- Presented by: Various (as of 2022; Edith Bowman and Amy Irons)
- Country of origin: Scotland
- Original language: English

Production
- Production locations: BBC Pacific Quay, Glasgow (since 2019)
- Running time: 60 minutes (often with a preview programme earlier in the evening)

Original release
- Network: BBC One Scotland (1991–present); BBC Two Scotland (1999); BBC Scotland (2019–present); BBC Red Button
- Release: 31 December 1991 – present

Related
- BBC New Year's Eve specials

Hogmanay (formerly Hogmanay Live) is a New Year's Eve television special broadcast by BBC One Scotland, covering Scotland's Hogmanay festivities. Jackie Bird and Phil Cunningham often hosted together each year but from 2008 until 2019 she solely presented the programme. Cunningham does still appear on the programme, though not as a host. Carol Kirkwood reported on the 2016 edition of the show live from Edinburgh Castle.

The show currently is hosted live from The Old Fruitmarket, Glasgow. Until 2013, Bird was live from Edinburgh Castle or Princes Street, but the show's producers decided that it should take place in Glasgow permanently. In 2019, Hogmanay Live was rebranded to Hogmanay and since then, the programme has been pre-recorded. The current presenter is Amy Irons. The programme in all its iterations feature a mixture of Scottish contemporary and folk music, with some past programming also featuring live coverage of parts of the Princes Street concert in Edinburgh.

The special features coverage of the firing of Edinburgh Castle's One O'Clock Gun at midnight and the subsequent fireworks and celebrations in Edinburgh.

== History ==
=== 1991–2018: Hogmanay Live ===
Hogmanay Live 2006 titlecard

Leon Jackson performs on Hogmanay Live 2008

The programme descended from BBC One's networked carriage of Hogmanay-themed variety specials on New Year's Eve from 1953 to 1985, such as The White Heather Club. The specials introduced names such as Jimmy Logan, Kenneth McKellar, Andy Stewart and Moira Anderson to a national audience, although faced a mixed reception for their reliance on Scottish stereotypes. By the 1980s, the special had become largely perfunctory; BBC Scotland attempted to retool the special for 1984–85 with Live into 85, but the production faced a number of setbacks and was poorly received by viewers. The BBC discontinued the national broadcasts, but continued to air the Hogmanay specials for viewers in Scotland.

==== 1999: New Year Live ====
In 1998–99, BBC One broadcast an adapted version of the special nationally under the title New Year Live, marking the first networked broadcast of a Hogmanay special from BBC Scotland since the ill-fated Live into 85. It was hosted by comedian Fred MacAulay and television presenter Carol Smillie from Edinburgh Castle and other locations, and featured a performance by Duran Duran. Prior to broadcast, critics raised concerns that the BBC were "anglicising" Hogmanay and downplaying its traditions, while Smillie conversely stated in a promotional interview that she thought Christmas was more important to her than the New Year.

MacAulay made several off-colour jokes during the telecast (most of which surrounding Smillie having been named "Rear of the Year" for 1998), while the telecast was plagued by a number of technical issues (including mistimed returns from pre-recorded sketches that led to microphone gaffes). The stage was briefly invaded by a group of attendees wielding axes. The special was derided by local critics, who criticised MacAulay and Smillie's hosting, felt that its comedy sketches and musical acts were poor, and that the special presented a diluted and anglicised version of Hogmanay. Viewership was also lower in Scotland than the previous year's edition.

=== 2019–present: Hogmanay ===
In 2019, the format changed and Hogmanay Live was renamed to Hogmanay with the outgoing year added at the end, the first edition was presented by Calman, Clarke and Irons, and was not filmed live. The 2020 programme was again hosted by Calman and was pre-recorded without a studio audience due to COVID-19. It was announced that Stirling Council would team up with BBC Scotland to organise a firework display over the Wallace Monument and Stirling Castle which would be broadcast on the programme from midnight.

The 2021 programme saw Calman axed from the presenting line-up and replaced by Edith Bowman and Amy Irons. Again, the programme was pre-recorded but for the first time, saw the return of a studio audience.

== Broadcasts ==
The programme is broadcast throughout the United Kingdom on BBC One Scotland. BBC One's London celebration, BBC New Year's Eve specials is also available in Scotland via digital television as well as BBC Two's Jools' Annual Hootenanny with Jools Holland.

Jackie Bird hosted the show every year from 1999 until 2018–19. Before then, it had various hosts.

No.	Year	Presenter(s)	Guest(s)		Location filmed
Hogmanay Live
1-7	1991–98	Various	Unknown		Various
8	1998–99	Fred MacAulay; Carol Smillie	Duran Duran		Various
9	1999–00	Jackie Bird; Phil Cunningham; Hazel Irvine	Unknown		Various
10	2000–01	Jackie Bird; Phil Cunningham	Unknown		Various
11	2001–02	Jackie Bird; Phil Cunningham	Unknown		Various
12	2002–03	Jackie Bird; Phil Cunningham	Unknown		Various
13	2003–04	Jackie Bird; Phil Cunningham	Unknown		Various
14	2004–05	Jackie Bird; Phil Cunningham	Unknown		Various
15	2005–06	Jackie Bird; Phil Cunningham	Phil & Aly	KT Tunstall, Nicola Benedetti, Texas	Princes Street, Edinburgh; Great Hall, Edinburgh
16	2006–07	Jackie Bird; Phil Cunningham	Phil & Aly	Karine Polwart, Paolo Nutini	Great Hall, Edinburgh
17	2007–08	Jackie Bird	Phil & Aly	Amy Macdonald, Marti Pellow	Pacific Quay, Glasgow
18	2008–09	Jackie Bird; Hardeep Singh Kohli	Phil & Aly	Leon Jackson, Sharleen Spiteri	Princes Street, Edinburgh
19	2009–10	Jackie Bird; Phil Cunningham; Aly Bain	Phil & Aly	Seth Lakeman, Pearl and the Puppets, Emily Smith	Pacific Quay, Glasgow
20	2010–11	Jackie Bird; Phil Cunningham	Phil & Aly	John McCusker, Michael McGoldrick, Ross Hamilton, James McIntosh	Pacific Quay, Glasgow
21	2011–12	Jackie Bird; Phil Cunningham	Phil & Aly	Admiral Fallow, Breabach, The House of Edgar Shotts and Dykehead Pipe Band	Pacific Quay, Glasgow
22	2012–13	Jackie Bird; Phil Cunningham; Catriona Shearer; Craig Hill	Phil & Aly	The Proclaimers, Frightened Rabbit, Rachel Sermanni	Princes Street, Edinburgh; Old Fruitmarket, Glasgow; Stirling; Inverness
23	2013–14	Jackie Bird	Phil & Aly	Deacon Blue, John McCusker, Heidi Talbot, Roddy Hart & The Lonesome Fire, Boghall and Bathgate Caledonia Pipe Band	Princes Street, Edinburgh
24	2014–15	Jackie Bird	Phil & Aly	Kenny Anderson, Blazin' Fiddles, Twin Atlantic	Old Fruitmarket, Glasgow
25	2015–16	Jackie Bird	Phil & Aly	Bay City Rollers, Biffy Clyro	Old Fruitmarket, Glasgow
26	2016–17	Jackie Bird; Carol Kirkwood	Phil & Aly	Amy Macdonald, Hue and Cry, RURA	Old Fruitmarket, Glasgow; Princes Street, Edinburgh
27	2017–18	Jackie Bird; Roddy Hart	Phil & Aly	KT Tunstall, Rag'n'Bone Man, The Scott Wood Band	Old Fruitmarket, Glasgow
28	2018–19	Jackie Bird; Roddy Hart; Bryan Burnett	Phil & Aly	KT Tunstall, Alesha Dixon, Karine Polwart, Des Clarke, Gregor Fisher	Old Fruitmarket, Glasgow
Hogmanay
29	2019–20	Susan Calman; Des Clarke; Amy Irons	Travis		Pacific Quay, Glasgow
30	2020–21	Susan Calman	Amy Macdonald, Deacon Blue, Blazin' Fiddles, Brian Cox, Karen Gillan		Pacific Quay, Glasgow
31	2021–22	Edith Bowman; Amy Irons	Emeli Sandé, Texas		Pacific Quay, Glasgow
32	2022–23	Edith Bowman; Amy Irons	Lewis Capaldi, Brooke Combe, Manran		Pacific Quay, Glasgow
33	2023–24	Edith Bowman	KT Tunstall and Skerryvore		Pacific Quay, Glasgow
34	2024–25	Amy Irons	Marti Pellow, Skippinish, Rianne Downey		Pacific Quay, Glasgow
35	2025–26	Amy Irons; Des Clarke	Nathan Evans, Michelle McManus, Robert Robertson, Georgia Cécile, Mànran, Karen Dunbar, Tom Urie, Cameron Miekelson		Pacific Quay, Glasgow

== In popular culture ==
The show was regularly lampooned in BBC Scotland's 1979–92 Hogmanay comedy sketch show Scotch and Wry (which was screened immediately before in the schedule), which usually involved Rikki Fulton in a post-closing credits skit aimed directly at Hogmanay Live. From 1993-2020 Only an Excuse? occupied the same schedule position and continued the parodies.

During Hogmanay Live 2001, one of presenter Jackie Bird's many costume changes included a small gold glittery top. Amid derision from the media, the top became one of the infamous moments of that year's programme and was auctioned off for charity during the BBC's Children in Need telethon later in the year.

== See also ==
- BBC New Year's Eve specials
