= Alan Douglas (journalist) =

Scottish journalist and broadcaster

Alan Douglas (born 16 October 1951, in Dundee) is a journalist and broadcaster.

He attended Kirkton High School, Dundee and Forfar Academy, leaving to begin work as a reporter on the Forfar Dispatch. He moved from there to work as a reporter on the Herts Pictorial which later became the Hitchin Comet. From there he joined BBC Local Radio, first at Radio Carlisle as a reporter/producer and then BBC Radio Humberside in Hull before returning to Scotland in 1978 to join BBC Scotland. As well as reporting and presenting on Radio Scotland's Good Morning Scotland he also worked as a reporter and later a studio presenter on BBC Scotland's evening news programme, Reporting Scotland, until 1996. He continued co-presenting Scottish Television's BAFTA-winning style programme, The Home Show, alongside his then wife Viv Lumsden, for eight years.

Douglas is a former founding director of The Broadcasting Business Ltd, a media consultancy specialising in media awareness, presentation skills training and crisis management. Douglas still writes extensively about driving and cars as a freelance motoring correspondent, contributing to websites, newspapers and BBC Radio and TV Scotland and Scottish Television on motoring and transport issues. He is co-founder and co-presenter of the motoring podcast Scotland the Drive.

He is a member of the Institute of Advanced Motorists and a qualified observer, training drivers to become Advanced Motorists. He is a former Regional Journalist of the Year of the Guild of Motoring Writers. He is Secretary of the Association of Scottish Motoring Writers and when he's not test driving and reviewing the latest models he can be found at the wheel of his beefy Isuzu four-wheel-drive pickup or Mazda convertible sportscar which he says he'll keep until he can no longer get into or more importantly, get out of. After many years living in Milngavie he has gone back to his roots and lives quietly in a hillside cottage in an Angus Glen.

He has a daughter and step-daughter from his first marriage and two step-children from his second. He now has eight grandchildren.

== General references ==
- Who's Who in Scotland (2003 ed.). Kilmarnock: Carrick Media. April 2003. ISBN 978-0-946724-52-9.
