= Stav Danaos =

British weather presenter of Greek Cypriot descent

- Born: 8 April 1978 (age 48); Berkshire, England
- Presenting career
- Show: BBC National News (weather)
- Network: BBC
- Style: Weather forecaster
- Country: United Kingdom
- Previous shows: Reporting Scotland, BBC Northern Ireland

Stavros "Stav" Danaos (born 8 April 1978) is an English weather presenter of Greek Cypriot descent. He currently presents the BBC's national weather forecast and has previously worked for Reporting Scotland.

== Career ==
In 2006, Danaos applied to join the BBC Weather Centre as a presenter. He joined the team and began presenting forecasts in February 2007. He began presenting weather for regional BBC news programmes such as Reporting Scotland. He also worked as a presenter in Newcastle, Northern Ireland and Birmingham. Danaos joined the BBC's national news channel to present regular forecasts in 2013.
