= Catriona Shearer =

Scottish journalist, broadcaster and producer

- Spouse: David Balfour (m. 2014)
- Children: 2

Catriona Shearer is a Scottish broadcast journalist and producer, who was a presenter on BBC Scotland's national news programme Reporting Scotland.

== Early life ==
Shearer grew up in Shotts, North Lanarkshire. Her father was a photographer and social worker and her mother was a primary school worker. She has one older brother who was lead singer of local Britpop band Octapus. She daughter of graduated from Edinburgh Napier University with a BA (Hons) degree in journalism.

== Career ==
After her graduation at Napier University in 2003, Shearer moved to London and joined BBC Radio 5 Live as a journalist and producer for the station's flagship news programmes - 5 Live Breakfast, Drive, The Midday News, and Weekend Breakfast. She later moved to Cardiff, working for BBC Radio Wales as a co-presenter for the Saturday afternoon sports show Sportstime and a producer on the station's entertainment, music and features output.

Shearer later joined BBC Radio Scotland as a producer for news programmes Newsdrive and Scotland Live and presented traffic updates during the flagship breakfast programme Good Morning Scotland. She also presented a weekly online video podcast and worked on the radio quiz show Soundbites before becoming a television news presenter in 2007. Shearer currently presents Reporting Scotland's breakfast bulletins on weekdays and is a stand-in anchor for the main 6:30pm evening programme.

Alongside Reporting Scotland, Shearer has also been involved with several BBC Scotland non-news programmes, including presenting a documentary on Pope Benedict XVI's tour visit to Scotland and a guest appearance on the football comedy series Only An Excuse?. As a keen music fan, she has also presented BBC Radio Scotland's overnight New Music Zone strand and has contributed to Kruger magazine and Gigwise. She is also a columnist for the Sunday edition of The Scottish Sun.

In May 2021, Shearer revealed on Twitter she would be leaving BBC Scotland after 16 years.

== Personal life ==
Shearer married engineer David Balfour on 4 January 2014 at Edinburgh Castle. They live in Hamilton, South Lanarkshire, and have two daughters, born on 17 January 2016 and 17 March 2018.
