= Graham Stewart =

Scottish radio and television broadcaster

Graham Stewart (born 1975 in Perth, Scotland) is a Scottish radio and television broadcaster who currently presents Reporting Scotland for BBC Scotland. He has previously presented on BBC Radio Scotland, Radio Clyde, Radio Tay and on various Edinburgh radio stations.

== Early life ==
Stewart studied a B.A. (Hons) in Politics at the University of Stirling for four years, then a course in Journalism Studies at the University of Strathclyde. Stewart went on to a course in Multimedia Communications at the University of the West of Scotland.

== Career ==
Stewart began his broadcasting career while studying at university, by presenting on Stirling University's Radio Airthrey 963, that broadcast more than 14 hours a day from Airthrey. He went on to present the weekend breakfast shows at his local radio station Tay FM from September 1996. He also substituted on various daytime shows for the next two years, then joined the commercial radio station Clyde 1 in October 1998 to present the weekend "Scottish Night Network" shows (concurrently airing across Scotland's local commercial radio stations Clyde 1, Forth 1, Northsound 1, Tay FM, Westsound, West FM and Westsound FM) then progressed to Clyde 1's Weekend Breakfast Show briefly in November 1999. Whilst there Stewart worked for Grampian TV in Aberdeen on weekdays since joining the station in April 1998, by producing and presenting political reports on the BAFTA award-winning news programme North Tonight for the ITV station covering the North of Scotland.

Stewart left Grampian and Radio Clyde to join Beat 106 in November 1999, where he was launch late night presenter and promoted to Drivetime within the first few weeks until joining Real Radio Scotland in October 2002, by overhauling Real Radio's Sunday morning current affairs talk show. He was also weekend breakfast presenter and main daytime dep.

In November 2005, Stewart compiled and presented daytime news bulletins on a freelance basis at the national rock and pop station Virgin Radio, then was part of the on-air launch team at the UK's first commercial talk radio station outside London, presenting his own daily phone-in show "Graham Stewart's Afternoon Edition" on Talk 107 from January 2006 – March 2007.

In April 2007, Stewart joined BBC Scotland as a regular presenter of Reporting Scotland news bulletins on BBC One Scotland, and flagship radio programmes such as Good Morning Scotland and Newsdrive on BBC Radio Scotland. Between 2008 and 2010 Stewart was the host of BBC Radio Scotland's breakfast phone-in show, Morning Extra and also launched the station's weekly business programme and hosted it for more than two years. In July 2014 he was the BBC's correspondent for the Commonwealth Games Queen's Baton Relay, reporting for the BBC News Channel and BBC Radio 2's Ken Bruce show among others. During the Scottish referendum campaign later that year he presented the daily 'Referendum Tonight' programme on BBC Radio Scotland in August and September 2014.

As a writer he wrote books and articles mainly on technology and media for publications, including Scotland on Sunday and Macworld. More recently, Stewart wrote a book and compiled a wiki devoted to the history of broadcasting in Scotland called 'Scotland On Air' – the book is due for release some time in the mid-2020s.
