= Judith Ralston =

Scottish weather presenter

- Born: Judith Tonner; Edinburgh, Scotland
- Occupation: Weather presenter
- Years active: 1999–present
- Employer: BBC Scotland
- Television: Reporting Scotland
- Spouse: Fraser Ralston
- Children: 3

Judith Ralston, née Tonner, is a Scottish weather presenter employed by BBC Scotland, and a former singer.

== Early life and music career ==
Ralston trained as a musician and studied singing at the Royal Scottish Academy of Music and Drama in Glasgow and then the Royal Northern College of Music in Manchester. Her operatic singing career ended at 28 after a vocal injury.

== Broadcasting career ==
In 1999, Ralston returned to Scotland as a traffic reporter at BBC Scotland; afterwards, she moved into news and weather presenting. In 2017 was listed as the third most popular weather presenter in a Radio Times poll.

In 2017, Ralston made a cameo appearance as herself in Series 4 Episode 6 of BBC Scotland’s Scot Squad

In 2025, Ralston co-presented Series 3 of BBC Scotland’s Scotland’s Greatest Escape.

In August 2026, Judith started presenting the weather on BBC One national news programmes at one, as well as the BBC News channel.

== Personal life ==
She lives in Glasgow and is married to Fraser Ralston, a meteorologist. They have three children together.
