= Brian Marjoribanks =

Scottish footballer, actor and television presenter (1942–2024)

Personal information
- Date of birth: 22 July 1942
- Place of birth: Falkirk, Scotland
- Date of death: 9 August 2024 (aged 82)
- Place of death: Palma de Mallorca, Spain
- Position: Forward

Youth career
- Airth Castle Rovers

Senior career*
Years	Team	Apps	(Gls)
1961–1963	Hibernian	5	(3)
1963–1964	Heart of Midlothian	0	(0)
- * Club domestic league appearances and goals

Brian Marjoribanks (22 July 1942 – 9 August 2024) was a Scottish footballer, actor, and BBC Scotland sports presenter.

== Life and career ==
Marjoribanks was born in Falkirk, Scotland on 22 July 1942. He trained as an actor at the Edinburgh College of Speech and Drama (now Queen Margaret University).

A forward, Marjoribanks played for Hibernian in the early 1960s. He scored a goal on his debut for Hibs, an Edinburgh derby against Hearts at Tynecastle. He then joined Hearts in 1963, playing for their reserve team during the 1963–64 season.

He retired from playing football in 1964, aged 21, to pursue a career in acting and he appeared in the BBC medical drama Dr. Finlay's Casebook and the soap opera United!. He was a regular presenter for BBC Scotland radio (Sportsound) and television (Sportscene) until 1983, when he was appointed to a role with the Independent Television Commission. He was later a director of STV.

Marjoribanks died after a brief illness at Son Espases Hospital in Palma de Mallorca, Spain, on 9 August 2024. He was 82.
