= Cat Cubie =

Scottish television weather presenter

Cat Cubie (born 1981) is a Scottish broadcaster, radio presenter, writer and podcaster. She is known for her work across television and radio, including BBC, Channel 4, MTV and Heart Scotland and her award-winning parenting podcast and book, The Sleep Mums. Her broadcasting and speaking work has also explored confidence, communication, identity and modern life. She is also the creator of Scottish Good News, a platform focused on positive stories from Scotland.

== Life ==
Cubie was born in 1981. Cat studied psychology at Aberdeen University. Her high achieving parents are the virologist Heather Cubie and Andrew Cubie.

=== Television ===
Cubie began her broadcasting career in television and has presented programmes for BBC1, Channel 4 and ITV. Her BBC work included presenting the BBC weather, The Surgery on BBC Switch and the National Lottery draws on BBC 1. She has also worked with MTV News, and presented film and entertainment programming for Channel 4. Her television work has included live broadcasts, entertainment coverage and music programming, including The Next Big Thing and Live and Unsigned.

Cubie has also worked as a television reporter and presenter at major live events and has appeared across Scottish and UK broadcast media.

=== Radio ===
Cubie has presented radio programmes for BBC Scotland and Real Radio.

She later joined Heart Scotland, where she presents the weekday afternoon show, broadcasting to listeners across Scotland. Her heart Scotland programme combines music, conversation, interviews and features and forms part of Heart's regional programming in Scotland.

Her radio career has established her as a familiar Scottish broadcast voice, alongside her work in television, podcasting and digital media.

=== Podcasting and publishing ===
During the COVID-19 lockdown, Cubie created The Sleep Mums podcast, a podcast about infant and child sleep, with paediatric sleep consultant Sarah Carpenter. The podcast combined practical advice with humour and a non-judgemental approach to parenting.

The Sleep Mums developed a substantial audience and led to a publishing deal with HarperCollins. Cubie and Carpenter co-authored Sleep Better, Baby: The Essential Stress-Free Guide to Sleep for You and Your Baby.Cubie has also worked as a writer and journalist, contributing to publications including The Guardian, The Telegraph, Grazia and Hello

=== Keynote speaking & confidence work ===
Alongside broadcasting and writing, Cubie has worked as a live event host and speaker. Her speaking work has included topics such as confidence, communication, importer syndrome, resilience and finding an authentic voice.

Her experience in live broadcasting informs talks and workshops exploring confidence and communication, particularly in relation to professional life and public performance.

=== Writing and Digital media ===
Cubie's work has expanded beyond traditional broadcasting into digital storytelling and original content. Her interests include confidence, communication, identity, wellbeing and contemporary Scottish life.

She has developed original digital content alongside her radio and television work, using short-form video, social media and other online platforms to explore subjects ranging from language and culture to personal confidence and stories from Scotland.

=== Scottish Good News ===
Cubie is the creator of Scottish Good News, a digital platform focused on positive, surprising and inspiring stories from Scotland. The project forms part of her wider work in digital storytelling and reflects her interest in Scottish culture, community and contemporary life.
