= Jackie Bird =

Scottish journalist, TV news presenter (born 1962)

Jackie Bird MBE
- Born: Jacqueline Macpherson; 31 July 1962 (age 63); Bellshill, Lanarkshire, Scotland
- Occupations: Journalist and broadcaster
- Years active: 1980–present
- Spouses: Bob Bird (div. 2006) Robin Weir (m. 2007)
- Children: Claudia; Jacob

Jacqueline Weir MBE (née Macpherson, formerly Bird; born 31 July 1962) is a Scottish journalist and broadcaster, best known as a former anchor of the BBC Scotland's national news programme Reporting Scotland until April 2019. Since 2022, she has been serving as the president of the National Trust for Scotland.

== Early life ==
Jacqueline Macpherson was born on 31 July 1962 in Bellshill, Lanarkshire, the daughter of Linda and Ronnie Macpherson. She has a younger brother and grew up in a council house in Hamilton, where her father was a school janitor and her mother worked in an old persons' home. She attended Earnock High School.

== Career ==
Bird was 17 when she started work for DC Thomson in Dundee, working on teenage magazines, and eventually became the pop editor at Jackie magazine. Subsequently, she worked as a broadcast journalist on Radio Clyde's news team and then as a food critic for the Glasgow Evening Times. After working as a reporter for The Sun newspaper, Bird joined Television South in Maidstone as a reporter and presenter for the South East edition of regional news programme Coast to Coast.

Bird left TVS to join BBC Scotland, making her debut as a main presenter of Reporting Scotland on Monday 16 October 1989. She has also been a main presenter of key event programming for BBC Scotland, including Hogmanay Live and the Scottish Children in Need opt-outs.

Bird is also a newspaper columnist and has written and produced comedy series The Lewis Lectures and Having it All for BBC Radio Scotland.

On 13 June 2012, she was awarded the honorary degree of Doctor of Letters (D Litt) in a graduation ceremony at the University of Glasgow.

In October 2014, Bird celebrated 25 years of working on Reporting Scotland, as the programme's longest-serving presenter.

On 11 April 2019, BBC Scotland announced Bird had left Reporting Scotland after nearly 30 years as a main presenter to concentrate on other projects. Bird presented her final programme the previous evening, without announcing her departure.

== Other work ==
Bird has also toured with Echo & the Bunnymen and worked with Paul Weller.

In November 2016, she appeared as herself in the episode, "Down and Out" in series 7 of Scottish sitcom Still Game. In 2018, Bird made a brief cameo appearance in the zombie Christmas musical film Anna and the Apocalypse.

She was appointed Member of the Order of the British Empire (MBE) in the 2025 New Year Honours for services to broadcasting and charity.

== Personal life ==
Bird met Bob Bird, a newspaper editor, at The Sun in Glasgow. They married and moved to London, where they had their two children. In 2006, the couple divorced and the following year she married investment fund manager Robin Weir on 23 November 2007 in East Kilbride.

In 2012, Bird had sections of her small and large intestine removed after suffering a rare bowel condition.
