= The Sunday Show (BBC Scotland) =

BBC television and radio politics programme for Scotland

- Presented by: Gary Robertson (November 2025 – present); Martin Geissler (February 2021 – October 2025)
- Country of origin: Scotland
- Original language: English

Production
- Producers: BBC News; BBC Scotland
- Production locations: BBC Pacific Quay, Glasgow
- Camera setup: Multi-camera
- Running time: 30 minutes (on BBC Scotland); 120 minutes (on BBC Radio Scotland)

Original release
- Network: BBC One Scotland; BBC Scotland; BBC Radio Scotland
- Release: 7 February 2021 – present

Related
- BBC Reporting Scotland

The Sunday Show is the BBC's Sunday morning politics programme for Scotland. It is broadcast from the headquarters of BBC Scotland in Pacific Quay, Glasgow. The 30-minute television programme typically follows Sunday with Laura Kuenssberg from New Broadcasting House.

The two-hour long show is simulcast weekly with the first half-hour broadcast on BBC One Scotland and the remainder aired on BBC Radio Scotland.

The programme is currently presented by BBC journalist Gary Robertson. He replaced launch presenter Martin Geissler during a schedule shake-up in late 2025.

== History ==
The show replaced the Sunday Politics Scotland television show and the Sunday edition of the Good Morning Scotland radio show. Gordon Brewer who presented Sunday Politics Scotland had announced his retirement in October 2020. The new show first aired on 7 February 2021.
