= Martin Geissler =

Scottish journalist (born 1971)

- Born: 1971 (age 54–55)
- Occupations: Journalist and Presenter

Martin Geissler (born 1971) is a Scottish presenter and broadcast journalist for BBC News Scotland. He currently co-hosts flagship morning news programme Radio Scotland Breakfast and Scottish news podcast Scotcast.

Geissler previously presented BBC Scotland’s The Nine and political programme The Sunday Show. Before joining the BBC, Geissler was a foreign correspondent at ITN.

== Career ==
Geissler joined the Scottish bureau of the then-recently launched Sky News in 1991. Later he joined Grampian Television (now STV North) working on the nightly regional news programme North Tonight before moving to Tyne Tees Television as a reporter on Tyne Tees Today.

Geissler joined Scottish Television (now STV Central) in February 1994 as a reporter, sports presenter and newsreader for Scotland Today. In 1998, he moved to Sky Sports as Scotland Correspondent, then rejoined Scotland Today eighteen months later.

He joined ITN in April 2002 as ITV News' Scotland Correspondent but was also involved with coverage of major international stories including the Second Gulf War, the Asian tsunami and Hurricane Katrina in New Orleans. In May 2006 he became the Africa Correspondent. Reports from Zimbabwe were nominated for Emmy, BAFTA and Royal Television Society awards. In August 2010 he became Europe Correspondent and in 2012 he became a UK-based correspondent.

As of February 2019, Geissler had joined BBC Scotland as co-anchor of the new BBC Scotland channel's news service. He was an original presenter of The Nine, along with Rebecca Curran. He later left the programme to become the host of BBC Scotland's flagship political programme The Sunday Show - a position he held for three years from its launch in 2022 to late 2025.

In January 2024, Geissler took over from John Beattie as the main presenter of BBC Radio Scotland's Drivetime programme with Fiona Stalker. He held this position for a year before leaving to become the main presenter of BBC News Scotland's podcast series Scotcast airing from 13 January 2025.

Geissler also hosted the BBC's first ever dedicated Scottish results programme for a general election on 6 July 2024.

Geissler returned to BBC Radio Scotland in November 2025 as part of the new presenting team for Radio Scotland Breakfast, a new morning show that replaced Scotland’s longest running radio programme Good Morning Scotland. Geissler co-presents the show Monday to Thursday from 06:00-09:00 with Laura Maciver and Phil Goodlad.

== Personal life ==
He lives in Muckhart, a village in Clackmannanshire. Married with two children, Geissler is a keen supporter of Heart of Midlothian F.C.
