= Amy Irons =

Scottish radio and TV presenter (born 1991)

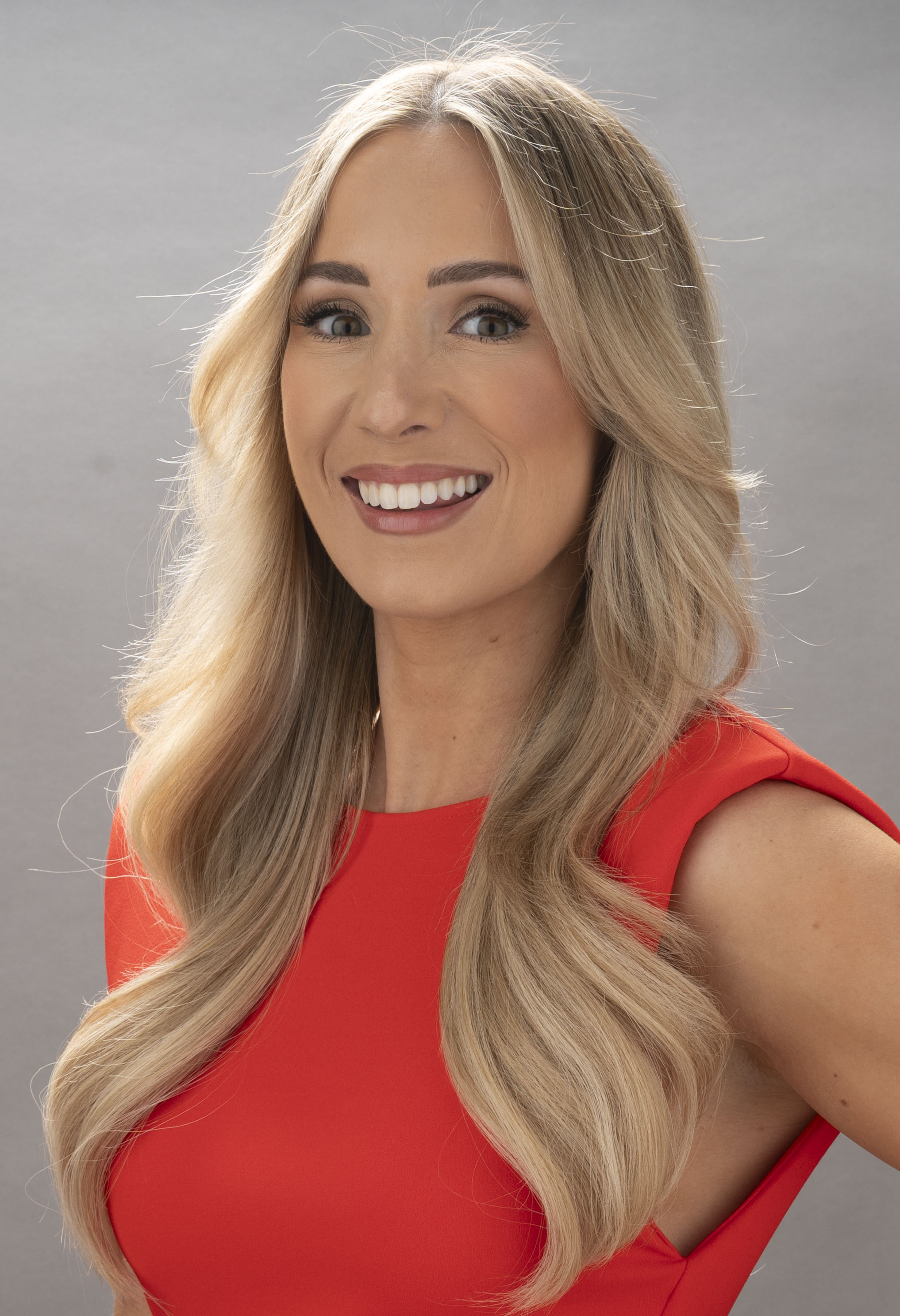
- Irons in 2024
- Born: Amy Irons; 28 May 1991 (age 35); Dumfries, Scotland
- Education: Glasgow Caledonian University
- Occupations: Presenter, DJ
- Years active: 2013–present
- Parent(s): Davie Irons; Fiona Irons

Amy J. Irons (born 28 May 1991) is a Scottish television and radio presenter. She currently works as a news and sport presenter for BBC Scotland.

== Career ==
=== Early career ===
After graduating in multimedia journalism from Glasgow Caledonian University, Irons began her career working at West FM in Ayr, Ayrshire, in 2013. After less than a year at the station, she joined STV in 2014 as a reporter and bulletin presenter for STV News and also working on STV Glasgow programmes. After three years at STV, Irons then moved to Capital Scotland in 2017, where she co-hosted The Capital Breakfast Show alongside Des Clarke and Steven Mill until 2019.

=== Joining the BBC ===
In 2019, Irons began working as a sport reporter for BBC Scotland's The Nine and has co-hosted the football-themed podcast Sacked in the Morning alongside Craig Levein since 2021. She has since hosted numerous other BBC programmes, including Reporting Scotland, Sportscene and BBC Scotland's Hogmanay.

In April 2023, Irons was announced as the host of the mid-morning show on the relaunched Heart Scotland. She left the station in June 2025 to return to the BBC full time.

In 2025, she became a launch presenter for the new Reporting Scotland programme News at Seven on the BBC Scotland channel.

Later that year, Irons became host of The Saturday Show on BBC Radio Scotland. A new topical entertainment programme featuring weekly news, music and daily sport. Irons presents with her former Capital Breakfast co-host Steven Mill, who also presents on Clyde 1.

Irons hosted BBC Scotland's Hogmanay show in 2024 and 2025.

=== Other ===
In September 2025, she began hosting the What If podcast for Suicide Prevention Scotland. Irons was chosen as she lost her partner Wayne Ewer to suicide in 2018.

== Personal life ==
Irons is the daughter of former footballer Davie Irons. Her younger brother, Lewis, works alongside her at BBC Scotland as a sports presenter and reporter.

In October 2026, Irons announced on BBC Radio Scotland’s The Saturday Show that she was expecting a baby boy. The presenter discovered the pregnancy with her first child while in the United States covering the 2026 FIFA World Cup, where she presented live editions of Reporting Scotland from Boston and Miami. Her PE-teacher partner, Elliot, 38, is the father.
