= The Adventure Show =

- Cape Wrath Challenge 2008/2009
- Created by: Richard Else
- Presented by: Dougie Vipond
- Starring: Duncan McCallum; Deziree Wilson; Cameron McNeish
- Country of origin: Scotland

Production
- Running time: 60 minutes

Original release
- Network: BBC Two Scotland
- Release: 26 February 2007 – 23 August 2025

The Adventure Show is a sport programme produced by Adventure Show Productions for BBC Sport Scotland, initially broadcast on BBC Two Scotland 2007–2018, then on BBC Scotland 2019–2024. Dougie Vipond was a regular host. A further special aired on BBC Alba in August 2025, covering the ITERA adventure race.

== History ==
The first series had eight 50 minute episodes, with the first episode broadcast on BBC2 Scotland on 26 February 2008 featuring coverage of the Strathpuffer cycle race. In the show's original format, Vipond was supported on screen by reporters Duncan McCallum and Deziree Wilson, while Cameron McNeish contributed a regular mountain walking slot.

When the series transferred to BBC Scotland in 2019, the show was reformatted as a weekly two-hour programme branded as The Adventure Show Live (or The Adventure Show Extreme for pre-recorded editions) and concentrating on one specific sport in each edition, in contrast to the previous magazine format. The new presenting team comprised Vipond, Patrick Winterton (who serves as lead commentator) and Lauren McCallum.

The show's main focus is on "adventure" sports, usually concentrating on one or two main events in each edition. Sports featured include climbing, kayaking, sailing, windsurfing and kitesurfing, various forms of bicycle racing, and cross-country running, especially ultramarathon and multi-discipline events. The show also includes features on people working in the adventure sports industry, such as medical crews and instructors. In its original format, camping tips, including consumer reviews and items on outdoor cookery, were often featured during spring and summer.

From time to time, the show would feature either Vipond, McCallum or Wilson taking part in a long-distance event to give the viewer an idea of what is involved. In 2012, Wilson achieved a third-place finish in the women's section at the Isle of Arran Goat Fell hill race while reporting for the programme.

In 2022 Amy Irons joined the show as a presenter. In 2024, two new presenters were announced- Calum Maclean and Marie Meldrum. In December 2024, the production company announced the BBC had decided not to recommission The Adventure Show in its current format. In August 2025, a week after that year's ITERA adventure race, a 60 minute special was aired on BBC Alba showing a team preparing for and then participating in the event.

The Adventure Show special, The Great Climb, broadcast live on 28 August 2010, won a Scottish BAFTA Award for Live Event Coverage.
