= Good Morning Scotland =

- Other names: GMS
- Genre: News, current affairs
- Running time: Weekdays: 06:00–09:00 (180 minutes); Saturday: 08:00–09:00 (60 minutes)
- Country of origin: Scotland
- Language: English
- Home station: BBC Radio Scotland
- Syndicates: BBC Radio nan Gàidheal
- Hosted by: Gary Robertson; Laura Maxwell
- Starring: Sport; Phil Goodlad; Gully Singh; Weather; Judith Ralston; Gillian Smart
- Edited by: Emma Marr
- Senior editor: Chris Cowan
- Recording studio: BBC Pacific Quay, Glasgow
- Original release: 31 December 1973 – 22 November 2025
- Audio format: Stereophonic sound
- Website: https://www.bbc.co.uk/programmes/b0074hf7

Good Morning Scotland was BBC Radio Scotland's flagship morning news and current affairs programme. It was established in 1973, making it the longest-running radio show broadcast from Scotland when it ended. It was broadcast weekdays from 06:00 to 09:00, and Saturdays from 08:00 to 09:00, until 22 November 2025 when it was replaced by Radio Scotland Breakfast, a similar radio programme.

The modern edition of the show was based in many respects on BBC Radio 4's Today programme, consisting of regular news, sport, business, travel and weather bulletins along with interviews, in-depth reports and a daily religious slot Thought for the Day.

In October 2025, following widespread media speculation, the corporation announced that Good Morning Scotland would be coming to an end. The final episode aired on 22 November 2025.

The show was replaced by Radio Scotland Breakfast on 24 November. It is hosted Monday to Thursday by BBC presenters Martin Geissler, Laura Maciver and Phil Goodlad from 06:00 to 09:00.

The show is hosted by Amy Irons and Fiona Stalker on Fridays, while former Good Morning Scotland presenter Gary Robertson fronts the hour-long Saturday edition of the programme.

== History ==
The programme was launched on the morning of 31 December 1973 with presenters David Findlay and John Milne. Prior to GMS, radio producers Geoff Cameron and Allan Muirhead were responsible for producing a daily opt-out from Today, called Today in Scotland. Its popularity led to the launch of Good Morning Scotland.

In 1980, to celebrate 50 years of broadcasting from the BBC's Edinburgh studios at Queen Street, Good Morning Scotland was simulcast on BBC One Scotland for a week, pioneering breakfast television on the BBC (ITV station Yorkshire Television had broadcast a breakfast programme for six weeks during 1977 and thus laid claim to the first semi-regular British breakfast television broadcast).

In 2006 there some major changes to the show, including a change of presenters with Gary Robertson brought in.

The programme had an estimated 455,000 listeners in 2008, which fell to 380,000 the following year.

In early 2015, weekend editions of the programme were introduced and broadcast from 08:00 - 10:00. But since February 2021, Good Morning Scotland has been broadcast Monday to Saturday, with the Sunday edition replaced by Sunday Mornings, a faith-based programme and current affairs, political programme The Sunday Show.

In mid-2025, the Saturday edition of Good Morning Scotland was shortened to one hour (08:00-9:00) after longtime BBC presenter Shereen Nanjiani left the broadcaster leading to schedule changes.

Shortly after this change, BBC Scotland announced the end of Good Morning Scotland, citing changing audience habits for a revamped breakfast offer. The final edition airs on Friday 21 November.

== Local variations ==
The first half of the programme is also broadcast on BBC Scotland's Gaelic-language station, BBC Radio nan Gàidheal before its Gaelic counterpart Aithris Na Maidne (Morning Report) begins at 07:30.

Listeners in Orkney opt-out between 07:30 and 08:00 for Around Orkney, a 30-minute magazine programme with features, local news and weather, diary, jobspot, mart report and postbag.

There are also local news bulletin opt-outs from Selkirk for the Borders, Dumfries for the South West, Aberdeen for the North East and Inverness for the Highlands.

== Former presenters ==
- Gary Robertson (Monday-Thursday)
- Laura Maxwell (Monday-Thursday)
- Graham Stewart (Relief/Fridays)
- Laura Maciver (Relief/Fridays)
- Andrew Black (Relief)
- Lucy Whyte (Relief)
- John Milne
- Douglas Kynoch
- Mary Marquis
- James Cox
- Mike Russell
- Joanna Buchan
- Neville Garden
- Eddie Mair
- Louise White
- Anne MacKenzie (1995–1997)
- Derek Bateman (1996–2006)
- Mhairi Stuart (1999–2006)
- Abeer MacIntyre
- Gillian Marles (2005–2009)
- Aasmah Mir (2009)
