= BBC Pacific Quay =

Headquarters of BBC Scotland

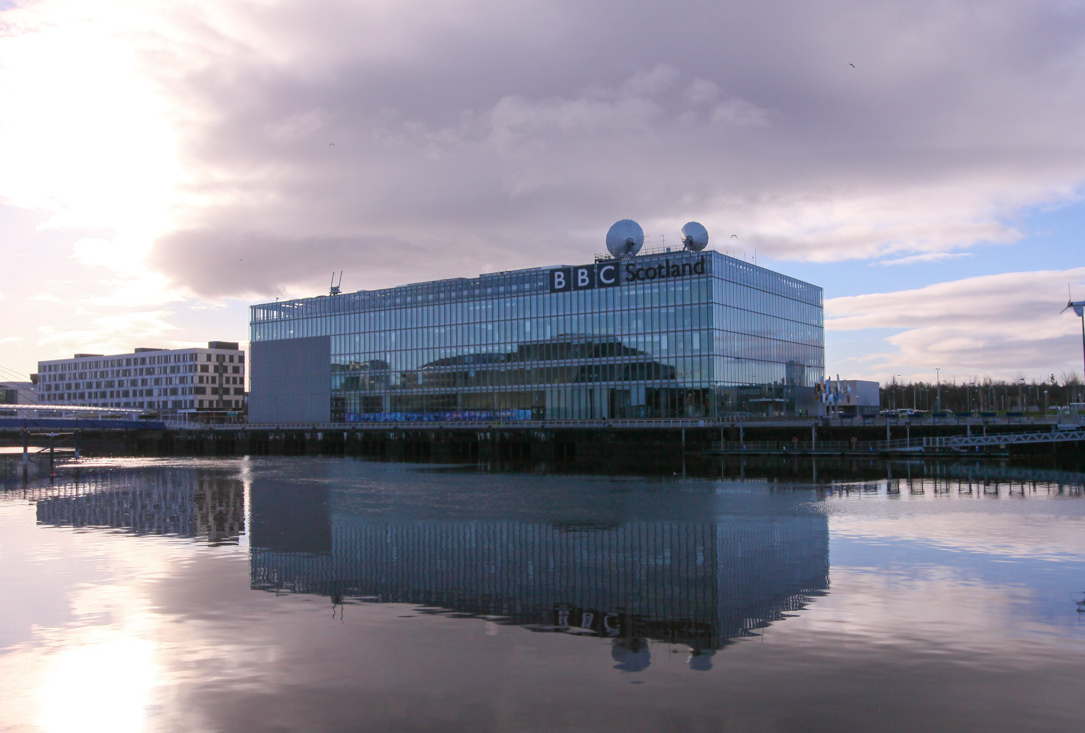
- BBC Pacific Quay, with the SEC Armadillo reflected in its glass facade

General information
- Type: Television and radio studios
- Architectural style: Post-modern
- Location: Glasgow, Pacific Quay, Pacific Drive, Glasgow, G51 1DA, Scotland
- Coordinates: 55.8580°N 4.2909°W
- Current tenants: BBC One Scotland; BBC Scotland; BBC Alba; BBC Radio Scotland; BBC Radio nan Gàidheal
- Opened: 20 September 2007
- Cost: £72 million
- Owner: BBC

Technical details
- Floor count: 6

Design and construction
- Architects: David Chipperfield Architects; Keppie Architects

Website
- www.bbcstreet.co.uk

BBC Pacific Quay is the headquarters of BBC Scotland, serving as its main television and radio studio complex, situated at Pacific Quay, Glasgow.

Opened by then Prime Minister Gordon Brown on 20 September 2007, the building was designed by architect David Chipperfield to feature an all glass facade which would change throughout the day, as well as different seasons and from various vantage points from across Pacific Quay. Within the building internally, a "stepped street" design rises throughout the entire length of BBC Pacific Quay. This design allows opportunities to employees to enter into break-out spaces, together with a range of different meeting areas.

A range of production and filming for BBC Scotland takes place at BBC Pacific Quay, including Reporting Scotland and Sportscene.

== History ==
=== Construction phase ===
The BBC had outgrown their old headquarters in Queen Margaret Drive, Glasgow. The need to move to a new location was also in part due to changing technology, with the network having a "desire to move with the times beyond a less than fit for purpose HQ to a new building which would avail us of the latest digital technology to offer improved quality to audiences". In July 1999 the BBC announced that around 800 staff would be moving to a new building that would be located at Pacific Quay. The BBC held a competition to design a new building with more than seventy companies attracted. By March 2001 there was a shortlist of seven entries.

The £72 million project on the River Clyde in Glasgow was designed by David Chipperfield Architects, but Keppie Architects took control in late 2004. It is home to the biggest TV recording space to be built in Scotland and has an area of 782 m^{2} (8,420 sq ft) with a new retractable stand seating for 320 audience members, although the studio can sit a maximum audience of 338 people.

=== Completion and opening ===
Upon its completion, BBC Pacific Quay was considered the "most advanced state-of-the-art broadcast centre in Europe". The design of the building allowed certain services to be offered by the network for the first time, such as live music, due to the increase in space available to the network to produce additional programming. Live music segments, entitled The Quay Sessions are recorded and produced via a pop-up studio located in the reception area of the building.

It is the only BBC location which allows opportunities for the combination of all of the BBC's media services including TV, radio and online, linking BBC Pacific Quay with other BBC centres around Scotland.

The complexes Studio A is the largest television recording space in Scotland, and the second largest television studio within the British Isles.

=== Significant events ===
During the 2014 Scottish independence referendum, Jeremy Vine broadcast from The Street within the building, using the "latest graphic gadgets". Election results for the Scottish Parliament, as well as Scottish results for UK General Elections are broadcast from BBC Pacific Quay.

On 1 December 2025, a fire broke out in the building. The incident began at around 06:30 GMT in a plant room on the fifth floor at roof level after an air-conditioning unit caught fire, prompting the full evacuation of staff. The Scottish Fire and Rescue Service deployed several appliances and brought the blaze under control, with crews leaving the site by late morning. No injuries were reported. The fire caused temporary disruption to broadcasting, with BBC Radio Scotland’s Breakfast programme taken off air—replaced briefly by BBC Radio 5 Live—and morning television bulletins suspended. Normal programming resumed later the same morning once the building was declared safe.

== Location ==
BBC Pacific Quay is located within the Pacific Quay area of Glasgow, alongside the cities historic shipping docks. Situated within an "exposed area of land", architectural firm responsible for its design, David Chipperfield Architects, said that the building "needed to assert its own sense of place and satisfy the brief that called for an enclosed yet publicly accessible building which would allow visibility of the BBC at work while maintaining tight security".

The studios are located adjacent to the Glasgow Science Centre, across the river from the Scottish Exhibition and Conference Centre and the OVO Hydro, and adjacent to the studios of commercial broadcaster STV. The new building is one of the most modern digital broadcasting facilities in the world, complete with the BBC's first HD-capable newsroom.

== Functioning ==
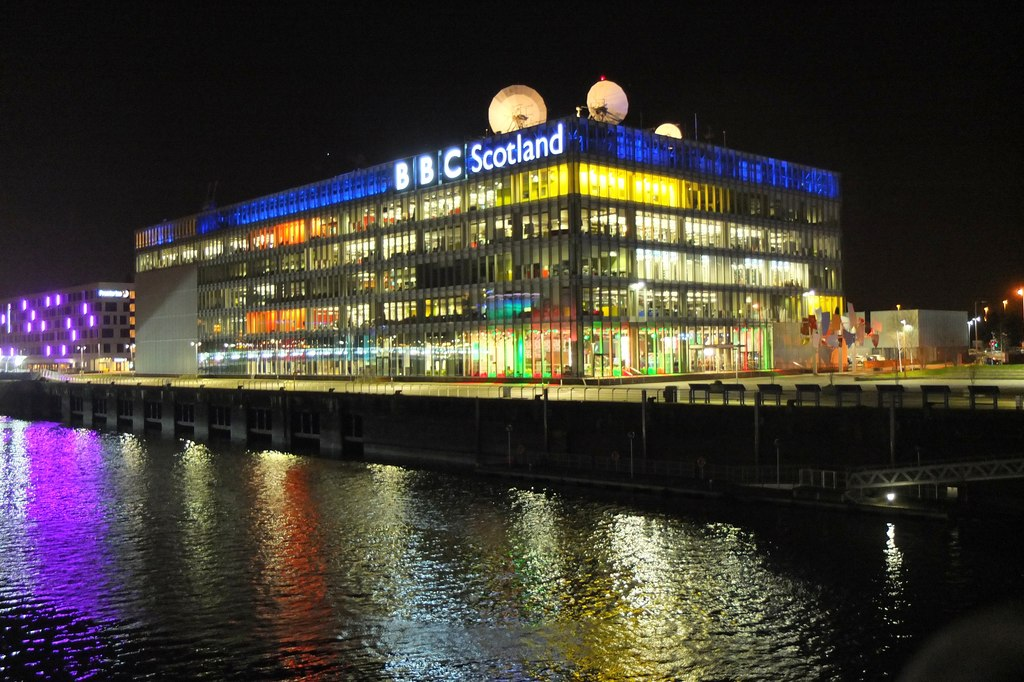
BBC Pacific Quay illuminated at night

Television studio facilities based at BBC Pacific Quay were rebranded as "Street @ BBC Scotland" in 2018.

There are three main television studios based at BBC Pacific Quay:

- Studio A is the largest television studio at the complex, with 8,417 sq ft (782 m^{2}) of studio floor space. It can easily accommodate studio audiences of up to 320.
- Studio B is the small to medium-sized studio, with 2,594 sq ft (241 m^{2}) of studio floor space. Small studio audiences of up to 100 can be accommodated in Studio B.
- Studio C is the smallest studio, with 1,938 sq ft (180 m^{2}) of studio floor space. It is the home to BBC Scotland's flagship news programme Reporting Scotland, and is also used for local news, politics and current affairs programming for BBC Scotland. Because of this, it is usually not available for use by other productions.

In addition, the Quay stage studio is used to host musical performances in front of a studio audience; acts have included KT Tunstall, Texas and The Fratellis. The central feature of the complex is used to record interviews, host political programming and transmit webcasts such as Authors Live.

The complex also houses facilities needed for television productions, such as nine dressing rooms, large green rooms, audience lounge, make up, wardrobe, production offices and full studio technical support services.

The complex also houses six radio studios used for BBC Radio Scotland, BBC Radio nan Gàidheal and other radio stations.

== Productions ==
Productions to be filmed at BBC Pacific Quay include The Weakest Link, Mrs. Brown's Boys, Impossible, Unbeatable, Get Set Galactic, Saturday Mash-Up!, The Hit List, Picture Slam, Richard Osman's House of Games, Catch Point, Sex Rated and PopMaster TV for Channel 4.
