= The Nine (BBC Scotland) =

BBC Scotland news programme

- Also known as: The Seven (Fridays, weekends, and bank holidays)
- Country of origin: Scotland
- Original language: English

Production
- Running time: 60 or 30 minutes (weekdays), 15 minutes (weekends)

Original release
- Network: BBC Scotland
- Release: 25 February 2019 – 19 December 2024

The Nine is a Scottish television news programme produced by BBC Scotland for the BBC Scotland channel, covering Scottish, UK and international news. From February 2019 to December 2024, it was broadcast weekdays at 9:00 pm as The Nine and weekends at 7:00 pm as The Seven.

== Broadcast ==
Produced by BBC News Scotland, the 60-minute programme was broadcast on BBC Scotland at 9:00 p.m. from Monday to Thursday nights.

On Fridays, Saturday, and Sunday evenings, a shortened edition was broadcast at 7:00 p.m. (half an hour on Fridays and 15 minutes on Saturdays & Sundays), likewise retitled The Seven.

== History ==
=== "Scottish Six" and inception ===
Plans for a "Scottish Six", a news programme which would see BBC Reporting Scotland and Scotland's airing of BBC News at Six be scrapped in favour of an hour-long Scottish news programme, was proposed as part of trials at BBC Pacific Quay in 2017. Despite there being a significant amount of support in having an hour-long news programme, plans for a "Scottish Six" news programme were scrapped in favour of a news programme which would be aired at a 9:00 pm time slot. STV News had tested the format on their STV2 channel with STV News Tonight, which began airing in April 2017 and would later be axed in 2018 as part of the channel's closure.

Following the scrapped proposal for a "Scottish Six" news programme, BBC Scotland announced in February 2017, plans to have the same format proposed be used for a news programme that would air at 9:00 pm on a brand new BBC Scotland TV channel that was launched in February 2019.

In November 2018, BBC Scotland announced details of the programme, including the identity of the show and the presenters. The first episode of The Nine aired on 25 February 2019, a day after the launch of the BBC Scotland channel.

=== Cancellation and proposed cutbacks ===
In February 2024, BBC Scotland announced plans to axe The Nine, along with weekly review programme Seven Days and the showbiz news programme The Edit as part of cutbacks to the channel's news output. The plans were approved by broadcast regulator Ofcom in August 2024 and confirmed by the corporation in December 2024.

These changes took place after low viewing figures attracted from BBC Scotland’s news output had been the subject of frequent criticism. According to newspaper reports in January 2024, one edition of The Nine attracted an audience of 1,700 viewers while an edition of The Seven was watched by just 200 viewers. On the day before the programme's axing was announced, The Nine was watched by 6,000 viewers, officially recording a zero share of viewing.

=== Reinvestment ===
Other investments made by BBC Scotland, using the money saved by cutting The Nine, include the expansion of the Debate Night series, increased investment in online news and the launch of a new topical current affairs visualised podcast series called Scotcast.

The Nine was replaced with a new half-hour news programme called Reporting Scotland: News at Seven. It began airing on BBC Scotland directly after its sister programme Reporting Scotland on BBC One Scotland from 6 January 2025.

== Presenters ==
The programme had a fifteen-strong team of presenters and reporters, who presented Scottish, UK, and international news from a Scottish perspective. It originally was presented by Rebecca Curran and Martin Geissler from Monday to Thursday and Laura Miller and John Beattie on Fridays. Weekends were hosted by the Reporting Scotland team. Amy Irons and her brother Lewis Irons were the main sports presenters since 2022, with original sport news presenter Laura McGhie now presenting on BBC Radio 5 Live and the BBC News channel.

== BBC Scotland team ==
The Nine / Seven presenters
Tenure	Presenter	Position
2021–2024	Laura Maciver	Main presenter (Monday–Wednesday)
2021–2024	Graham Stewart	Rotational presenters (Monday-Friday) and Relief (Monday–Friday)
2019–2024	Laura Goodwin	Rotational presenters (Monday-Friday) and Relief (Monday–Friday)

Other presenters of other programmes
Tenure	Presenter	Position	Programme	Status
2019–2024	David Farrell	Main presenter	The Edit	No longer airing
2019–2024	Fiona Stalker	Main presenter	Seven Days	No longer airing
2021–2025	Fiona Stalker	Main presenter	The Sunday Show	Currently airing
2021–2025	Martin Geissler	Main presenter	The Sunday Show	Currently airing
2025–present	Gary Robertson	Main presenter	The Sunday Show	Currently airing

Other TV Presenters across BBC Scotland
Tenure	Presenter	Position	Other roles	Notes
2021–2024	Amy Irons	Sports Presenters	Former presenter of The Edit	
2019–2024	Laura McGhie	Sports Presenters	BBC Radio 5Live and BBC Sport presenter	
2021–2024	David Wallace Lockhart	Political Correspondent	Relief Presenter	
2021–2024	Anne McAlpine	Relief rotating Presenters (Monday-Sunday)	Reporting Scotland presenters	
2021–2024	Sarah McMullan	Relief rotating Presenters (Monday-Sunday)	Reporting Scotland presenters	
2021–2024	Andrew Black	Relief rotating Presenters (Monday-Sunday)	Reporting Scotland presenters	
2022–2024	Louise Cowie	Relief rotating Presenters (Monday-Sunday)	Reporting Scotland presenters	
2023–2024	Hope Webb	Relief rotating Presenters (Monday-Sunday)	Reporting Scotland presenters	
2019-2021	Rebecca Curran	Former Presenters	Aberdeen news reporter for Reporting Scotland	
2019-2022	Martin Geissler	Former Presenters	The Sunday Show and Good Morning Scotland presenter	
2022-2023	Gary Robertson	Former Presenters	Good Morning Scotland presenter	
2019-2023	John Beattie	Former Presenters	BBC Radio Scotland host	
2019-2024	Nick Sheridan	Former Presenters	Seven Days presenter (2019–2024)	
2019-2024	Laura Miller	Former Presenters	Reporting Scotland presenter	
2024	Julia MacFarlane	Former Presenters	Relief presenter	Freelance journalist at BBC Scotland
