= Debate Night =

- Current title card
- Genre: Topical debate
- Presented by: Stephen Jardine
- Country of origin: United Kingdom
- Original language: English

Production
- Producer: Mentorn Media
- Production location: On location
- Running time: 60 minutes

Original release
- Network: BBC Scotland
- Release: 27 February 2019 – present

Related
- Debate Night Extra; Question Time

Debate Night is BBC Scotland's flagship current affairs debate show, hosted by Stephen Jardine, which airs on Wednesdays nights.

== History ==
Stephen Jardine was named as the host on 15 February 2019 ahead of the launch of the new BBC Scotland channel on 24 February 2019. The show first aired on Wednesday 27 February 2019 with a 10.45pm start time, with an initial run of 24 episodes. In April 2019, BBC Scotland announced a move to airing the programme on Sunday nights at 10pm. In September 2020, due to coronavirus restrictions, changes were made for the audience to participate by videoconference links. On 29 September 2021 audience participation in person restarted with a show in Edinburgh. Shows were aired on Wednesdays on BBC Scotland at 10:30 pm and on BBC One Scotland at midnight.

== Format ==
It uses a format where panel members are not behind a desk and where usually four topics are each afforded 15 to 20 minutes to allow discussion. Details of the guests are usually kept confidential until the programme is broadcast.

The programme is produced by Mentorn Media, the company that make the Question Time programme that airs on BBC One.
