= BBC Scotland (TV channel) =

Scottish TV channel

- Logo used since 2021
- Country: United Kingdom
- Broadcast area: Scotland

Programming
- Language: English
- Picture format: 1080i/1080p (Note: 1080p25 sometimes on Freeview only) HDTV (downscaled to 576i for the SDTV feed)

Ownership
- Owner: BBC
- Sister channels: BBC One; BBC Two; BBC Three; BBC Four; BBC News; BBC Parliament; CBBC; CBeebies; BBC Alba

History
- Launched: 24 February 2019; 7 years ago
- Replaced: BBC Two Scotland
- Closed: Spring 2027 (planned)

Links
- Website: www.bbc.co.uk/bbcscotland

Availability

Terrestrial
- Freeview (Scotland only): Channel 9 (SD); Channel 108 (HD)

Streaming media
- BBC iPlayer: Watch live (UK Only)

BBC Scotland (also referred to as the BBC Scotland channel) is a local free-to-air public broadcast television channel owned and operated by the BBC Scotland division of the BBC. It airs a nightly lineup of entirely Scottish programming. The channel launched 24 February 2019, replacing the BBC Two Scotland opt-out of BBC Two, but operating as an autonomous channel (displacing BBC Four on Freeview in Scotland).

== History ==
As of 2017, BBC Scotland had operated regional variations of BBC One and BBC Two for the Scottish region, as well as the Gaelic channel BBC Alba. On 22 February 2017, BBC director general Lord Hall announced that the corporation planned to replace BBC Two Scotland with a new, part-time BBC Scotland television channel, focused exclusively on Scottish programming. A feature of the channel would be an hour-long 9:00 p.m. weeknight newscast produced from Scotland, covering national and international headlines from a Scottish perspective. The proposed newscast was compared to the frequent proposals for a Scotland opt-out of the BBC News at Six. Hall also announced that the BBC would increase its overall spending on factual and drama productions in Scotland by £20 million annually.

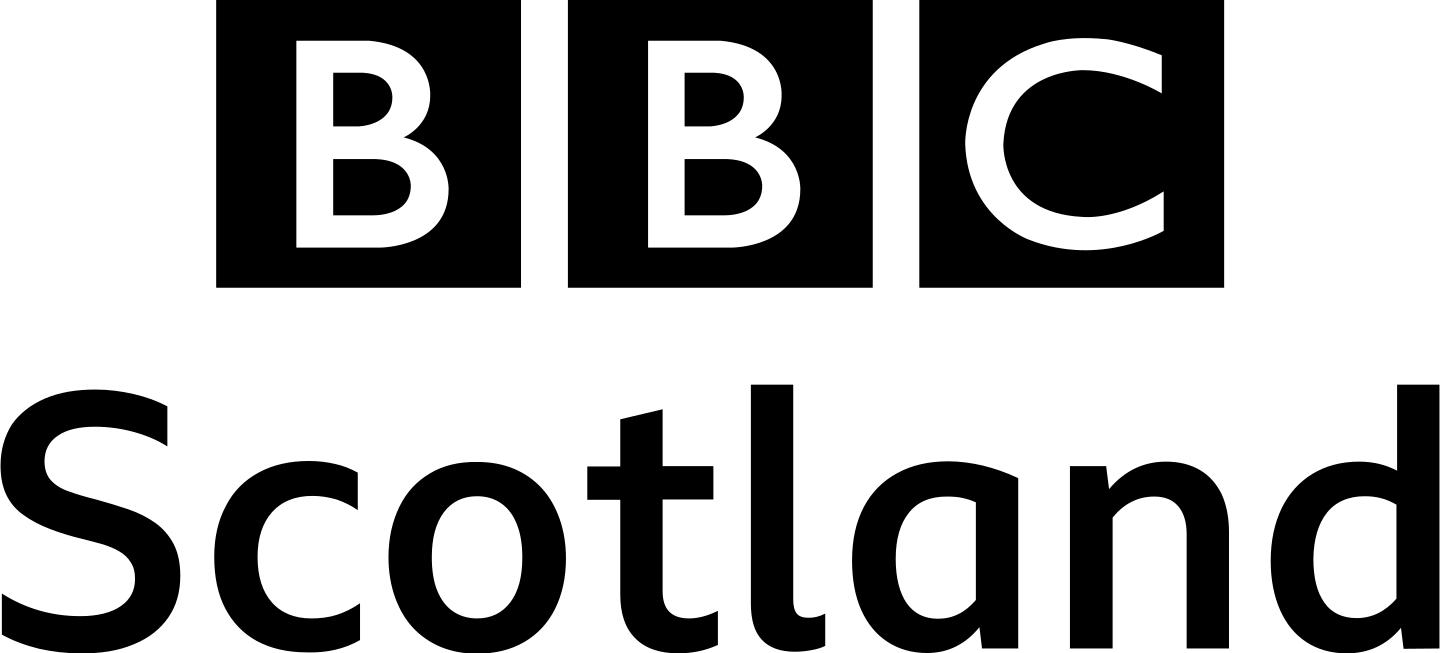
Logo used from 2019 to 2021

Ofcom granted provisional approval to the new service in April 2018, but showed concerns for its proposal to only dedicate half of its lineup to new programmes (seeing it as removing potential opportunities for independent producers), and directed the BBC to ensure that the channel does not have an undue impact on competing news outlets (including newspapers and other broadcasters, with the former expressing concern that the BBC would poach employees from newspapers to build its expanded Scotland news operation). Ofcom granted final approval to the service in June 2018: the BBC subsequently announced a planned launch for February 2019. The channel was allocated £32 million in annual funding.

In preparation for the launch of the new channel, BBC Two Scotland was discontinued and replaced by the networked version from England beginning 18 February. BBC Scotland launched 24 February at 19:00; it signed on with an introductory video, featuring a performance of "Miracle" by the Scottish synthpop group Chvrches, accompanied by the BBC Scottish Symphony Orchestra. Its first programme was a variety special (A Night at the Theatre) hosted by comedian Iain Stirling. Opening night programming also included the broadcast television premiere of the documentary Nae Pasaran, the one-off Burnistoun special Burnistoun Tunes In, and the ninth and final series premiere of Still Game. Viewership peaked at 700,000.

On 20 October 2026, the BBC announced that it would close the BBC Scotland channel from spring 2027 as part of wide-ranging budget cuts aimed at saving £500 million. It will move to an online-only service on iPlayer, and the BBC said that some of its programmes would air on BBC One and BBC Two in Scotland. The Scottish government condemned the plans, with culture minister Màiri McAllan calling them "wholly unacceptable".

== Programming ==
BBC Scotland's main broadcast hours are 19:00. to midnight and outside of these hours, it simulcasts BBC Radio Scotland, although initially, the channel simulcast the BBC Two schedule between midday and 19:00 with surrounding continuity from BBC Scotland, thereby accommodating the daytime sport and political programming opt-outs which had been displaced following the closure of BBC Two Scotland.

At least 95% of programming must be of Scottish origin, and the BBC stated that roughly half of its programming would be new.

The first main programme to air on BBC Scotland was the 9th series premiere of Still Game on the channel's first day.

The channel’s first drama commission Guilt was a significant success, receiving a strong critical reception and winning a number of awards. Guilt has gone on to be broadcast around the world.

=== News ===
BBC Scotland's initial flagship news programme was The Nine, an hour-long newscast which reported on UK and international news from a Scottish perspective. The programme was broadcast Mondays to Friday 21:00 to 22:00. A shortened, 15-minute bulletin at 19:00 (The Seven) aired on weekends, and the channel also aired the entertainment recap The Edit and week-in-review programme Seven Days. The channel also aired Debate Night, a Question Time-like programme presented by Stephen Jardine.

On 20 February 2024, amid poor viewership, BBC Scotland announced cutbacks to the channel's news programming, with The Edit and Seven Days cancelled, and The Nine being replaced by a half-hour 19:00 bulletin. To compensate for the cancellation, the BBC stated that it would also produce additional Debate Night episodes and Reporting Scotland specials, and expand its investments in online journalism in Scotland. These changes were approved by Ofcom in August 2024. In September 2024, BBC Scotland premiered The Entertainment Mix, a weekly entertainment newsmagazine hosted by singer-songwriter Michelle McManus. In January 2025, BBC Scotland premiered its new 19:00 newscast, BBC Reporting Scotland: News at Seven, which focuses primarily on Scotland-related news.

=== Sport ===
BBC Scotland has traditionally shown sport on Friday evenings with Scottish Championship and the early rounds of the Scottish Cup matches featuring on Sportscene presented by Leanne Crichton and Steven Thompson from 19:00. With football talk show A View From The Terrace, adapted from the cult Terrace Scottish Football Podcast aired later on Friday evenings. AVFTT is produced by Edinburgh-based Studio Something and is presented by Craig G. Telfer, with analysis from Shaughan McGuigan, and The Scotsman journalists Craig Fowler and Joel Sked.

== Continuity announcers ==
There are four main continuity announcers on the BBC Scotland channel, who also double up as playout directors, overseeing transmission of the channel's programming and presentation.

- Dominic Main from Drongan was a student at the University of the West of Scotland and has studied broadcast production for many years.
- George Taylor from Glasgow worked in marketing for The Sunday Times and The Times Scotland.
- Jennie Cook from Kingussie is a former Capital Scotland breakfast presenter.
- Cameron McKenna from Glasgow (relief announcer) is a former STV continuity announcer and a former radio newsreader.

All continuity on the channel is performed live and broadcast from BBC Scotland’s HQ at Pacific Quay in Glasgow.

In November 2021, Dominic’s dog Bear made a special continuity appearance on BBC Scotland, barking over the channel announcement introducing the launch of Scotland’s Best Dog. The appearance marked Bear’s brief debut as a television continuity announcer.

== Identification ==
BBC Scotland's idents feature the channel's logo in the centre of the screen, usually accompanied with a background that fits the colour of the logo when it eventually is lit up. In the first set of idents, the BBC Scotland logo is featured among cobblestones on a rainy street, a bird which flies around the logo as well as a subway station (specifically Buchanan Street subway station in Glasgow).

== See also ==
- BBC One Scotland
