= Kirkcaldy =

Coordinates: 56.11073°N 3.16737°W

Kirkcaldy: Scottish Gaelic: Cair Chaladain; Scots: Kirkcaldy; The Lang Toun
- Town and former royal burgh
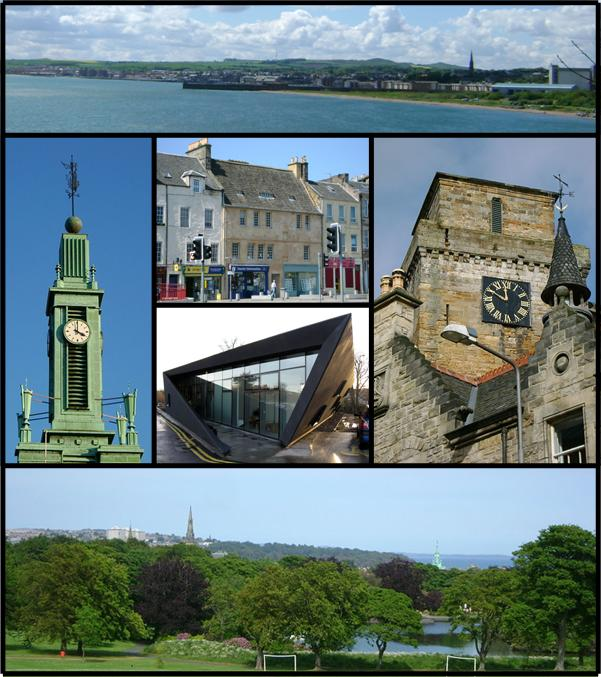
- Waterfront and bay (top), Townhouse clock (middle left), Old Kirk (top right), Merchants House/ High Street (top centre) Maggie's Fife (bottom centre), Beveridge Park pond (bottom)

- Location within Fife
- Area: 6.9 sq mi (18 km^{2})
- Population: 51,117 (2022)
  - Density: 7,300/sq mi (2,800/km^{2})
- OS grid reference: NT275915
  - Edinburgh: 11 mi (18 km) S
  - London: 341 mi (549 km) SSE
- Civil parish: Kirkcaldy and Dysart
- Council area: Fife
- Lieutenancy area: Fife
- Country: Scotland
- Sovereign state: United Kingdom
- Post town: KIRKCALDY
- Postcode district: KY1, KY2
- Dialling code: 01592
- Police: Scotland
- Fire: Scottish
- Ambulance: Scottish
- UK Parliament: Cowdenbeath and Kirkcaldy
- Scottish Parliament: Kirkcaldy

Kirkcaldy (/kɜːrˈkɔːdi/ kur-KAW-dee; Scots: Kirkcaldy; Scottish Gaelic: Cair Chaladain) is a town and former royal burgh in Fife, on the east coast of Scotland. It is about 11 1/2 miles (19 kilometres) north of Edinburgh and 27 1/2 mi (44 km) south-southwest of Dundee. The town had a recorded population of 51,117 in 2022, making it Fife's second-largest settlement and the 11th most populous settlement in Scotland.

Kirkcaldy has long been nicknamed the Lang Toun (Scots for "long town") in reference to the early town's 0.9-mile (1.4 km) main street, as indicated on maps from the 16th and 17th centuries. The street would finally reach a length of nearly four miles (six kilometres), connecting the burgh to the neighbouring settlements of Linktown, Pathhead, Sinclairtown and Gallatown, which became part of the town in 1876. The formerly separate burgh of Dysart was also later absorbed into Kirkcaldy in 1930 under an act of Parliament.

The area around Kirkcaldy has been inhabited since the Bronze Age. The first document to refer to the town is from 1075, when Malcolm III granted the settlement to the church of Dunfermline. David I later gave the burgh to Dunfermline Abbey, which had succeeded the church: a status which was officially recognised by Robert I in 1327. The town only gained its independence from Abbey rule when it was created a royal burgh by Charles I in 1644.

From the early 16th century, the establishment of a harbour at the East Burn confirmed the town's early role as an important trading port. The town also began to develop around the salt, coal mining and nail making industries. The production of linen which followed in 1672 was later instrumental in the introduction of floorcloth in 1847 by linen manufacturer, Michael Nairn. In 1877 this in turn contributed to linoleum, which became the town's most successful industry: Kirkcaldy was a world producer until well into the mid-1960s. The town expanded considerably in the 1950s and 1960s, though the decline of the linoleum industry and other manufacturing restricted its growth thereafter.

Today, the town is a major service centre for the central Fife area. Public facilities include a main leisure centre, theatre, museum and art gallery, three public parks and an ice rink. Kirkcaldy is also known as the birthplace of social philosopher and economist Adam Smith who wrote his magnum opus The Wealth of Nations in the town. In the early 21st century, employment is dominated by the service sector: the biggest employer in the town is PayWizard, formerly known as MGT plc (call centre). Other main employers include NHS Fife, Forbo (linoleum and vinyl floor coverings), Fife College, Whitworths (flour millers) and Smith Anderson (paper making).

== History ==
=== Toponymy ===
The name Kirkcaldy means "place of the hard fort" or "place of Caled's fort". It is derived from the Pictish *caer meaning "fort", *caled, which is Pictish "hard" or a personal name, and -in, a suffix meaning "place of". Caled may describe the fort itself or be an epithet for a local "hard" ruler. An interpretation of the last element as din (again meaning "fort") rather than -in is incorrect. The Old Statistical Account gives a derivation from culdee, which has been repeated in later publications, but this is also incorrect.

=== Early ===
The discovery of 11 Bronze Age cist burials which date from 2500 BC and 500 BC suggests that this is the most ancient funerary site in the area. What probably made this location ideal was its natural terraces stretching away from the sand bay, and the close proximity of the East Burn to the north and the West (Tiel) Burn to the south. Four Bronze Age burials dating from around 4000 BC have also been found around the site of the unmarked Bogely or Dysart Standing Stone to the east of the present A92 road. Although there are few Roman sites in Fife, a Roman camp was known to exist at Carberry Farm on the town's outskirts.

The Battle of Raith in AD 596 was once believed to have taken place to the west of the town's site but the theory no longer holds support. The battle was said to have been fought between the Angles and an alliance, led by King Áedán mac Gabráin of Dál Riata, of Scots, Picts and Britons.

=== Medieval ===
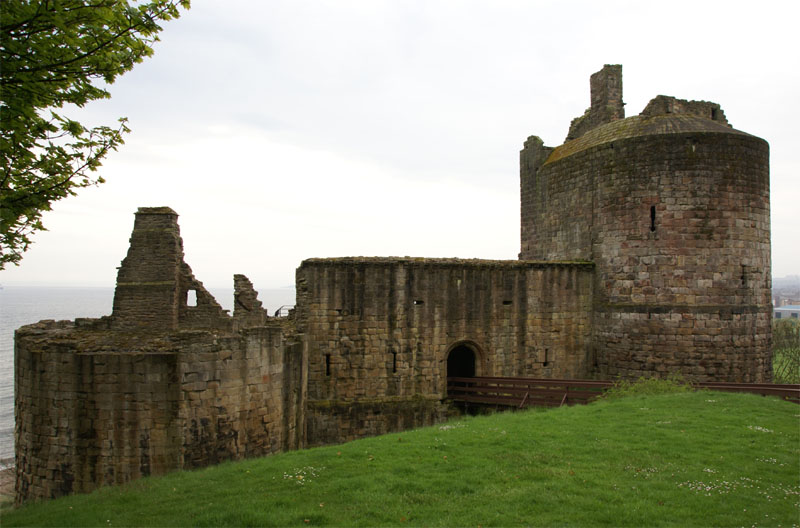
Ravenscraig Castle was begun in 1460

The first document to recognise the town was issued in 1075, when the King of Scots, Malcolm III (reigned 1058–93) granted the shire of Kirkcaladunt, among other gifts, to the church at Dunfermline. The residents were expected to pay dues and taxes for the church's general upkeep. Two charters, later confirmed by Malcolm's son David I in 1128 and 1130, refer to Kircalethin and Kirkcaladunit respectively, but do not indicate their locations.

In 1304, a weekly market and annual fair for Kirkcaldy was proposed by the Abbot of Dunfermline to King Edward I, during a period of English rule in Scotland from 1296 to 1306. During these discussions, the town may have been referred to as "one of the most ancient of burghs". This status as a burgh dependent on Dunfermline Abbey was later confirmed in 1327 by Robert I, King of Scots.

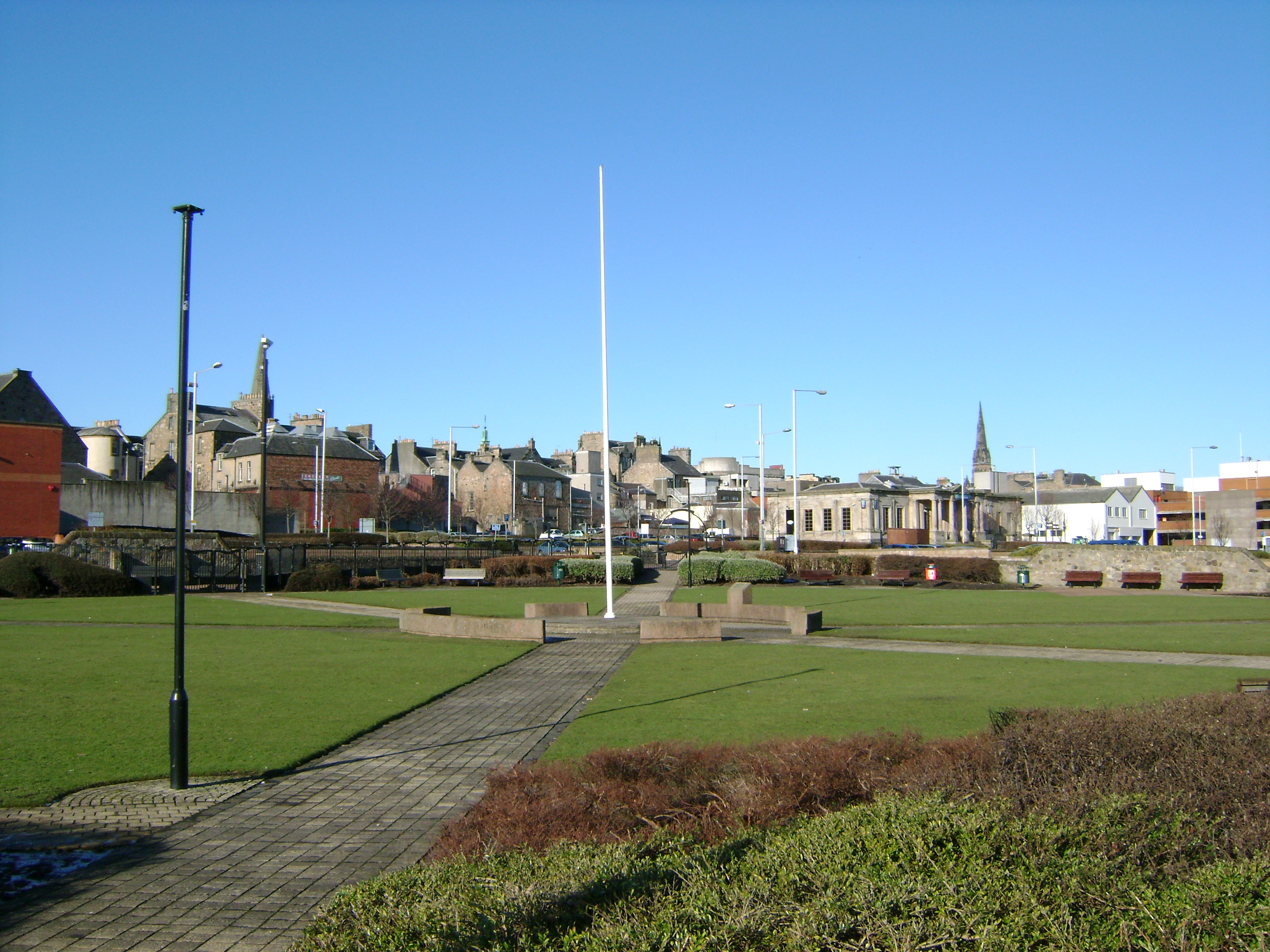
Remains of the common muir now known as Volunteers' Green

A charter granted in 1363 by David II, King of Scots (reigned 1329–1371), awarded the burgh the right to trade across the regality of Dunfermline. This charter allowed the burgesses of Kirkcaldy to purchase and sell goods to the burgesses of the three other regality burghs – Queensferry, Dunfermline and Musselburgh – that belonged to the Abbey. By 1451, Kirkcaldy was awarded feu-ferme status. Under the status, responsibility would now lie with the bailies and council to deal with the routine administration of the town and its fiscal policies; conditional on an annual payment of two and a half marks (33s 4d) to the Abbot of Dunfermline.

=== 16th to 18th centuries ===
At the beginning of the 16th century, the town became an important trading port. The town took advantage of its east coast location, which facilitated trading contacts with the Low Countries, the Baltic region, England, and Northern France. The feu-ferme charter of 1451 between the Abbot of Dunfermline and the burgesses of Kirkcaldy mentioned a small but functioning harbour; it is not known when this harbour was established, or whether it was always located at the mouth of the East Burn. According to treasurers' accounts of the early 16th century, timber imported via the harbour—possibly from the Baltic countries—was used at Falkland Palace and Edinburgh Castle, as well as in shipbuilding.

Raw materials such as hides, wool, skins, herring, salmon, coal and salt were exported from the town until well into the 17th century. Ships from Kirkcaldy brought wine and spices from Spanish ports including Cádiz. In April 1598, the Grace of God, belonging to James Birrell of Kirkcaldy, was attacked off the Cape St. Vincent by the English Green Dragon of Bristol. Birrell's ship sank and the mariners who reach the shore were in danger of being made captive by Turkish authorities.

A charter issued by Charles I granting royal burgh status in 1644 resulted in the end of the Abbey's jurisdiction over the town. As a gesture, the king bequeathed 8.12 acres (3.29 ha) of common muir suitable for "bleaching of linen, drying of clothes, recreation and perpetuity". In 1638, under the reign of Charles I, the town subscribed to the National Covenant, which opposed the introduction of episcopacy and patronage in the Presbyterian church. Support for the Covenanting cause cost the town over 250 men at the Battle of Kilsyth in 1645. The continuing civil wars killed at least another 480 men and led to the loss of many of the harbour's trading vessels. By 1660, this left the town with only twelve registered ships, down from 100 it is claimed were recorded between 1640 and 1644.

Towards the end of the 17th century, the economy recovered, with growth in manufacturing. During this period, Daniel Defoe described Kirkcaldy as a "larger, more populous, and better built town than ... any on this coast". A shipbuilding revival produced 38 vessels between 1778 and 1793. In the mid-19th century, whaling became important to the town for a short time. In 1813, the first Kirkcaldy whaling ship, The Earl Percy, sailed north to the Davis Strait; the town's last whaler, The Brilliant, was sold in 1866 to Peterhead, bringing an end to the industry. Construction of a new turnpike from Pettycur to Newport-on-Tay via Cupar in 1790, while improving only one section of Fife's isolated road system, brought a huge increase in traffic along Kirkcaldy's High Street, and helped to strengthen the town's position.

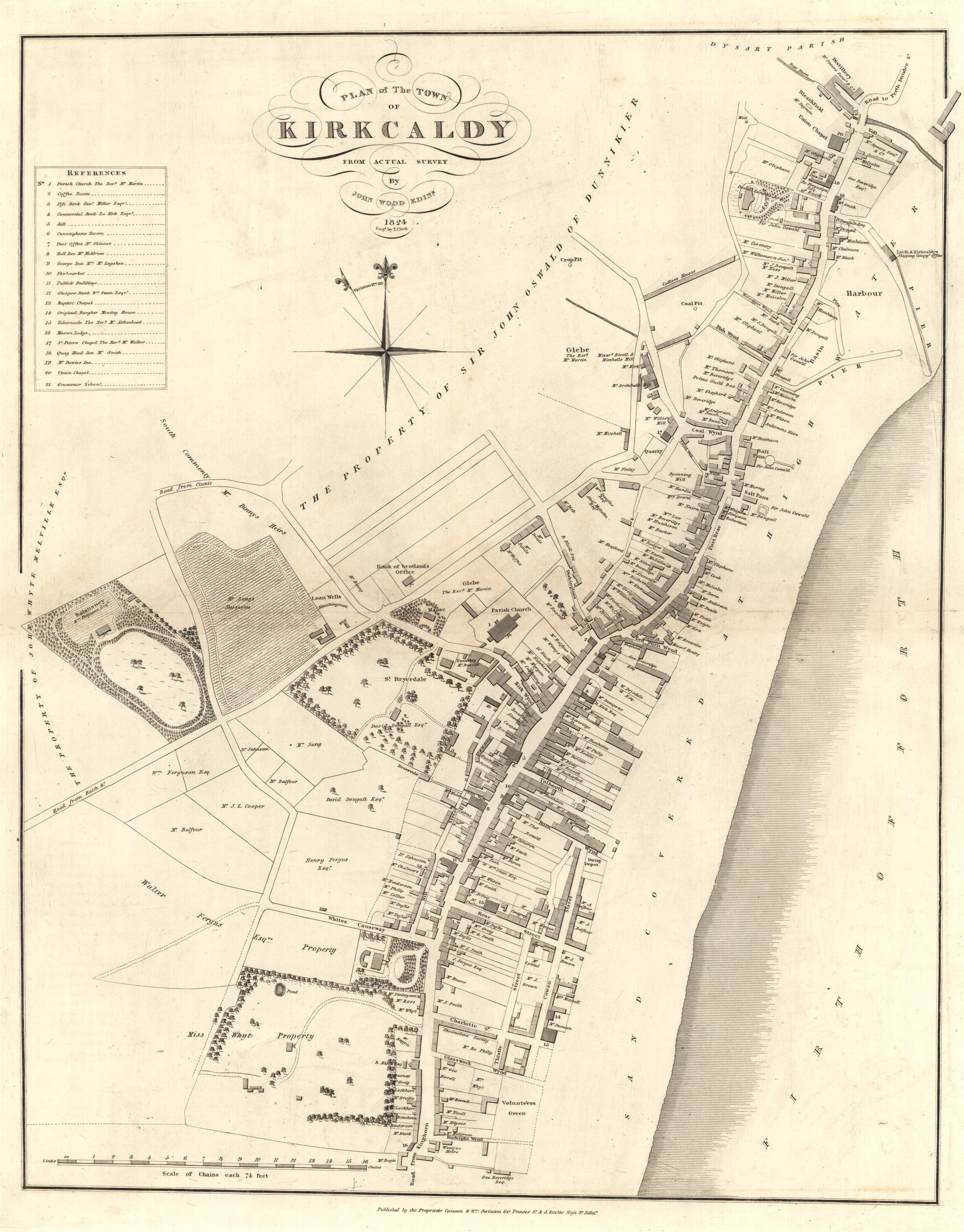
Royal Burgh of Kirkcaldy, 1824

=== Modern ===
For most of the 19th century, the main industries in the town were flax spinning and linen weaving. To cope with increasing imports of flax, timber and hemp, and exports of coal, salt and linen, between 1843 and 1846 a new wet dock and pier was built at the harbour. In 1847 a canvas manufacturer, Michael Nairn, took out a licence on Frederick Walton's patent for the production of floorcloth, and opened a factory in nearby Pathhead. When the patent expired in 1876, Nairn and other floorcloth manufacturers began the manufacture of linoleum. Production of both floorcloth and linoleum occupied seven factories in the town by 1883, employing 1,300. A further expansion of the harbour was completed between 1906 and 1908, for another increase in linoleum and coal. The smell of the linoleum factories was notorious, giving rise to the famous lines in Mary Campbell Smith's 1913 poem The Boy in the Train: "For I ken mysel' by the queer-like smell / That the next stop's Kirkcaddy!".

Kirkcaldy Corporation Order Confirmation Act 1930
- Act of Parliament
- Parliament of the United Kingdom
- Long title: An Act to confirm a Provisional Order under the Private Legislation Procedure (Scotland) Act 1899 relating to Kirkcaldy Corporation.
- Citation: 20 & 21 Geo. 5. c. xciii

Dates
- Royal assent: 4 June 1930
Other legislation
| Repealed by | Kirkcaldy Corporation Order Confirmation Act 1939 |
| Relates to | Private Legislation Procedure (Scotland) Act 1899 |

Status: Repealed

Text of statute as originally enacted

The expansion of the town led in 1876 to the extension of the royal burgh's boundaries. The town absorbed its neighbouring settlements of Linktown, in the parish of Abbotshall; Invertiel in the parish of Kinghorn; and Pathhead, Sinclairtown and Gallatown in the parish of Dysart. These formerly separate settlements had once been forbidden by the old guild rights to sell their goods in Kirkcaldy. In 1922–1923 a seawall and esplanade were constructed, funded by the Unemployment Grants Commission and built by unemployed residents. In 1930, the town would further expand to include the former royal burgh of Dysart under the Kirkcaldy Corporation Order Confirmation Act 1930 (20 & 21 Geo. 5. c. xciii) when its own town council became bankrupt.

During the 1950s and 1960s, new housing estates were built north-west of the town. This was followed by the redevelopment of the town centre in the 1960s and 1970s, which destroyed much of the old high street. There was speculation that the town's population could increase to around 55–60,000 by 1970. This did not happen: a decline in the linoleum industry in the mid-1960s led to a decrease in population, from a peak of 53,750 in 1961 to 47,962 in 1981.

In the 21st century, Kirkcaldy remains an important centre for the surrounding areas, with a Museum and Art Gallery, three public parks and shopping facilities. The town also hosts the annual Links Market, commonly known as Europe's longest street fair. The production of linoleum continues, though on a greatly reduced scale, under Swiss ownership (Forbo Holding AG). Kirkcaldy Harbour, which closed in 1992, re-opened in October 2011 to cargo ships. A project between Carr's Flour Mills, the parent of Hutchison's, Forth Ports (owners of the harbour) and Transport Scotland, will allow Carr's to bring in wheat via the harbour and remove a quarter of its lorries from the roads every year.

== Governance ==
The grant of feu-ferme status in the middle of the 15th century meant that the town could deal with its own administrative issues and fiscal policies for the first time. The first mention of a town council was around 1582. The head courts of the burghs met either in the Common Muir (the surviving portion of the land now known as Volunteers' Green) or in the Tolbooth on Tolbooth Street, particularly in the summer months. When Kirkcaldy was awarded royal burgh status in 1644, the duties of the provost were initially performed by bailies, councillors, and magistrates. The first Lord Provost, Robert Whyt, was elected to the post around 1658. The burgh was one of four in Scotland to use two coats of arms, introduced in 1673. One bears the motto Vigilando Munio ("I secure by watching"), and the other displays the figure of Saint Bryce, Kirkcaldy's patron saint.

Kirkcaldy enjoyed royal burgh status until this rank was abolished in 1975 under the Local Government (Scotland) Act 1973, in favour of a three-tier system of regions and districts. The royal burgh merged into Kirkcaldy District, which was one of three districts within the Fife region. The district council was abolished in 1996 under the Local Government etc (Scotland) Act 1994 when the region became a unitary council area. The new Fife Council adopted the areas of the former districts as council management areas and created area committees to represent each.

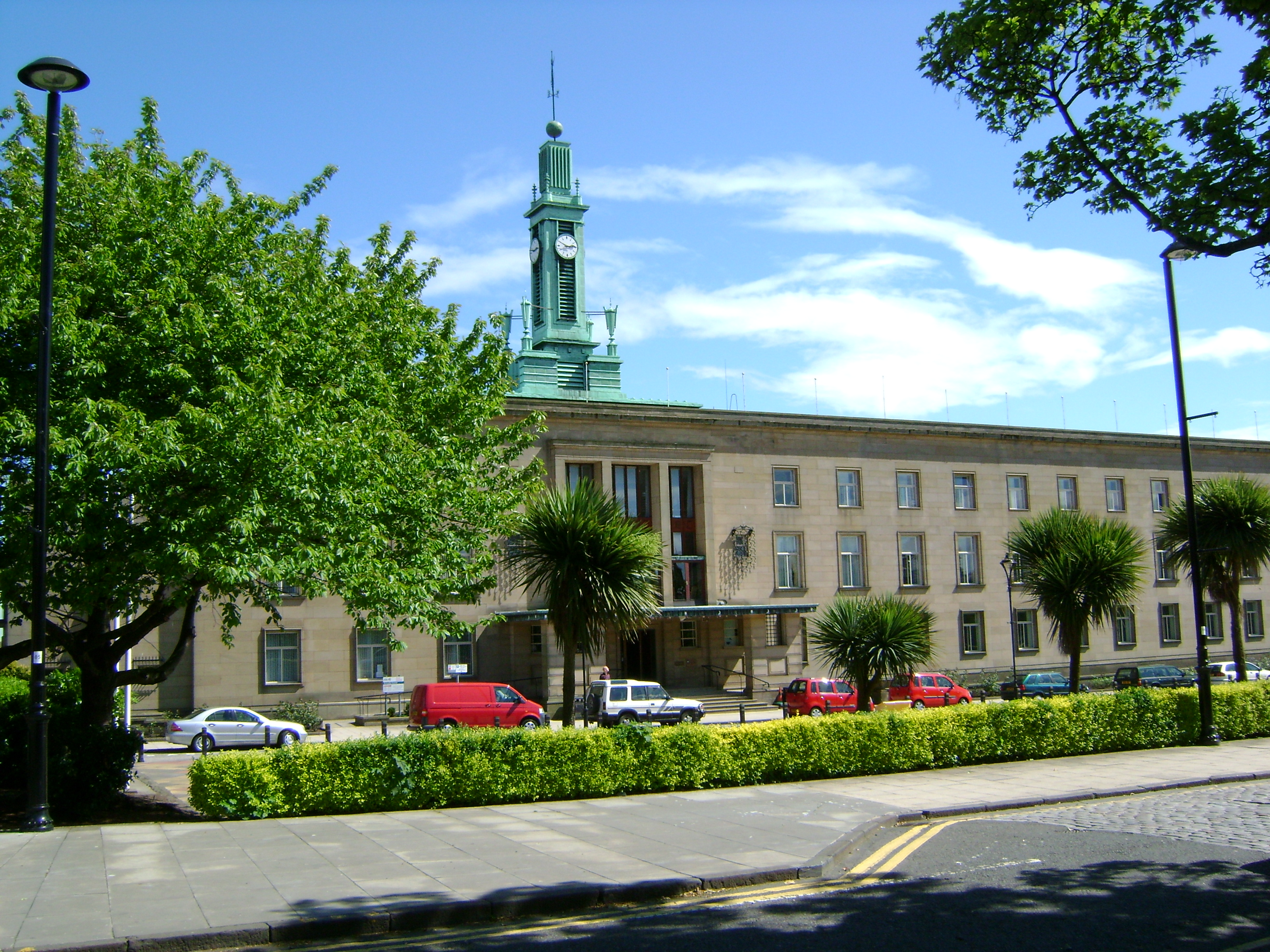
Kirkcaldy Town House

Kirkcaldy is represented by several tiers of elected government. It is divided into six community council areas: Bennochy and Hayfield, Dysart, Kirkcaldy East, Kirkcaldy North, Kirkcaldy West, and Templehall. Of these, only Dysart, Kirkcaldy North and Kirkcaldy West have active community councils, which form the lowest tier, and whose statutory role is to communicate local opinion to local and central government. Together with the nearby village of Thornton, the town forms the civil parish of Kirkcaldy and Dysart, although civil parishes now have no administrative functions, and are used mainly for statistical purposes.

Fife Council, based in Glenrothes, the unitary local authority for Kirkcaldy, is the executive, deliberative, and legislative body responsible for local governance. Kirkcaldy Town House is the main administrative headquarters for the Kirkcaldy area within the local authority. The Kirkcaldy area also sends 11 councillors, elected from three wards, to Fife Council. Beyond the tiers of local government, the Scottish Parliament is responsible for devolved matters from the Parliament of the United Kingdom, such as education, health, and justice.

The first Member of Parliament to be elected to the House of Commons from Kirkcaldy was Colonel Abercrombie in 1710. Prior to the Act of Union in 1707, Kirkcaldy sent a Member of Parliament to the old Scottish Parliament, which usually met in Edinburgh. Kirkcaldy was represented by the constituency of Dysart Burghs from 1707 to 1832, which was formed from the burgh itself and three other burghs, Dysart, Kinghorn, and Burntisland. Under the Reform Act 1832, the constituency of Kirkcaldy Burghs was created. Robert Ferguson of Raith was re-elected as Member of Parliament. Kirkcaldy forms part of the county constituency of Cowdenbeath and Kirkcaldy, electing one Member of Parliament to the House of Commons of the Parliament of the United Kingdom by the first past the post system. Since the 2017 General Election, Lesley Laird of the Labour Party has been Member of Parliament for Kirkcaldy and Cowdenbeath.

Kirkcaldy forms part of the Kirkcaldy constituency of the Scottish Parliament (or Holyrood), and is one of nine within the Mid Scotland and Fife electoral region. Each constituency elects one Member of the Scottish Parliament by the first–past–the–post system of election, and the region elects seven additional members to produce a form of proportional representation. The Kirkcaldy seat was won at the 2011 Scottish Parliament elections by David Torrance for the Scottish National Party (SNP). Following a review of Scottish Parliament constituency boundaries, the Kirkcaldy constituency was extended along the coast, taking in the Buckhaven, Methil, and East and West Wemyss villages ward, ahead of the 2011 elections. Prior to Brexit in 2020 it was part of the pan-Scotland European Parliament constituency, which elected seven Members of the European Parliament (MEPs).

== Geography ==
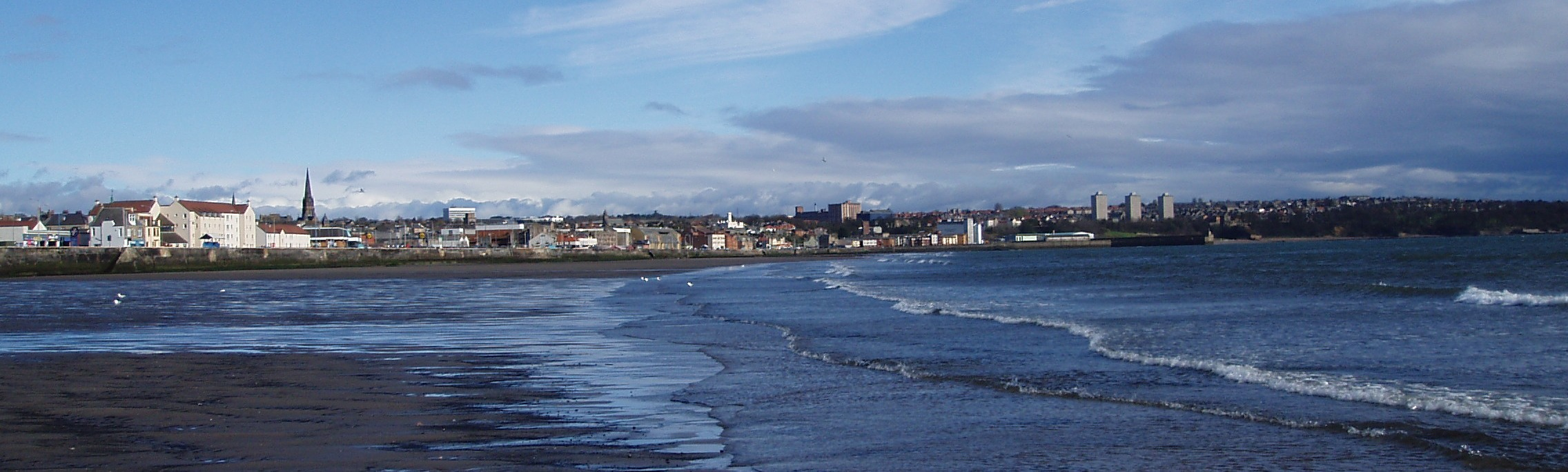
View of Kirkcaldy Bay seen from the beach near Invertiel

Kirkcaldy curves around a sandy cove between the Tiel (West) Burn to the south and the East Burn to the north, on a bay facing southeast onto the Firth of Forth. The town lies 9.3 miles (15 km) south-southeast of Glenrothes, 11.8 miles (19 km) east-northeast of Dunfermline, 44.4 miles (71 km) west-southwest of Dundee and 18.6 miles (30 km) north-northeast of Edinburgh. The town adopted its nickname of the lang toun from the 0.9-mile (1.4 km) single street, recorded on early maps of the 16th and 17th centuries. The street eventually reached a length of nearly 4 miles (6.4 km), linking the burgh to its neighbouring suburbs of Linktown, Pathhead, Sinclairtown and Gallatown.

Historians are not sure where the medieval centre of Kirkcaldy was located, but it may have been at the corner of Kirk Wynd and the High Street. This would have been the site of the town's Mercat cross and focal point of the burgh. The linear market was important not only to the town itself but to the nearby hinterland. The main thoroughfare was either paved or cobbled, with flagstones covering small burns running down the hill towards the sea across the High Street. Running back from the High Street were burgage plots or "rigs" of the burgesses; these narrow strips of land were at the front and to the rear of the houses. On the sea side of the High Street, plots may have served as beaching grounds for individual tenements. The plots on the other side of the High Street rose steeply to the terracing of the Lomond foothills. A back lane running behind the plots from Kirk Wynd went to the west end of the High Street in a southerly direction. This lane would in time be developed as Hill Street. At the top of Kirk Wynd was the Parish Church of St Bryce, now known as the Old Kirk, overlooking the small settlement.

The small burns that are tributaries to the East Burn contributed to the draining of the lands of Dunnikier Estate. The burn emerges from a deep-set culvert to flow under the Victoria Viaduct, down a deep gorge, through the site of Hutchison's Flour Mills before running parallel to the harbour wall and into the sea. From the mid-19th century, the Hutchison's buildings became a significant landmark adjacent to the burn. The flour millers chose this area for its railway connection which linked the main station to the harbour, rather than for the need to use the burn to power the mills. The West (or Tiel) Burn, was also important, providing power for textile mills. This burn flowed out of the Raith Estate lands where scenically and recreationally it was used to create Raith Lake (with its tributary, the Dronachy Burn). The mill owners in Linktown also made use of the burn.

== Climate ==
Climate data for Kirkcaldy (6 m asl, averages 1991–2020)
| Month | Jan | Feb | Mar | Apr | May | Jun | Jul | Aug | Sep | Oct | Nov | Dec | Year |
|---|---|---|---|---|---|---|---|---|---|---|---|---|---|
| Record high °C (°F) | 12.8 (55.0) | 13.3 (55.9) | 18.3 (64.9) | 21.1 (70.0) | 22.2 (72.0) | 26.1 (79.0) | 26.7 (80.1) | 26.7 (80.1) | 25.0 (77.0) | 23.7 (74.7) | 18.1 (64.6) | 13.8 (56.8) | 26.7 (80.1) |
| Mean daily maximum °C (°F) | 7.0 (44.6) | 7.7 (45.9) | 9.5 (49.1) | 12.0 (53.6) | 14.7 (58.5) | 17.1 (62.8) | 18.9 (66.0) | 18.9 (66.0) | 16.6 (61.9) | 13.2 (55.8) | 9.6 (49.3) | 7.2 (45.0) | 12.7 (54.9) |
| Daily mean °C (°F) | 4.1 (39.4) | 4.6 (40.3) | 6.1 (43.0) | 8.0 (46.4) | 10.6 (51.1) | 13.3 (55.9) | 15.2 (59.4) | 15.2 (59.4) | 13.0 (55.4) | 9.8 (49.6) | 6.4 (43.5) | 4.1 (39.4) | 9.2 (48.6) |
| Mean daily minimum °C (°F) | 1.2 (34.2) | 1.6 (34.9) | 2.7 (36.9) | 4.1 (39.4) | 6.5 (43.7) | 9.4 (48.9) | 11.5 (52.7) | 11.4 (52.5) | 9.3 (48.7) | 6.5 (43.7) | 3.2 (37.8) | 1.0 (33.8) | 5.7 (42.3) |
| Record low °C (°F) | −9.4 (15.1) | −10.0 (14.0) | −7.8 (18.0) | −4.4 (24.1) | −1.7 (28.9) | 1.1 (34.0) | 3.9 (39.0) | 2.8 (37.0) | 0.5 (32.9) | −2.4 (27.7) | −5.6 (21.9) | −8.9 (16.0) | −10.0 (14.0) |
| Average precipitation mm (inches) | 67.4 (2.65) | 57.6 (2.27) | 56.4 (2.22) | 48.0 (1.89) | 54.3 (2.14) | 64.3 (2.53) | 71.4 (2.81) | 67.8 (2.67) | 60.8 (2.39) | 86.2 (3.39) | 81.8 (3.22) | 81.2 (3.20) | 797.3 (31.39) |
| Average precipitation days (≥ 1.0 mm) | 12.6 | 10.2 | 10.7 | 10.0 | 11.6 | 9.6 | 10.4 | 10.5 | 10.9 | 13.5 | 12.1 | 12.6 | 134.7 |
| Mean monthly sunshine hours | 46.5 | 81.4 | 112.6 | 156.0 | 204.0 | 158.3 | 175.3 | 158.8 | 124.8 | 97.4 | 67.9 | 42.6 | 1,425.6 |
Source 1: Met Office (precipitation days 1981-2010)
Source 2: Starlings Roost Weather

== Demography ==
Towards the end of the 16th century, a detailed assessment on the size of the townscape was carried out. The first estimate of the parish population in 1639 was between 3,000 and 3,200 and around 3,400 by 1691. At the beginning of the 18th century, the population declined. A census by Webster's Topographical Dictionary of Scotland in 1755, recorded an estimate of 2,296 in the parish. By the time of the first nationwide UK census in 1801, the population had risen to 3,248. The population of the burgh was recorded as 4,785 in the 1841 Census, and had risen to 34,079 by 1901. By the time of the 1951 Census, the figure stood at 49,050.

Kirkcaldy compared according to UK Census 2011
| | Kirkcaldy | Fife | Scotland |
|---|---|---|---|
| Total population | 49,709 | 365,198 | 5,295,403 |
| Percentage Scottish identity only | 66.6% | 63.8% | 62.4% |
| Over 75 years old | 8.8% | 7.9% | 7.7% |
| Unemployed | 6.4% | 4% | 4.8% |

According to the 2001 UK Census, the census locality of Kirkcaldy has a total resident population of 46,912 representing 13.4% of Fife's total population. It hosts 21,365 households. 14.8% were married couples living together, 16.4% were one-person households, 18.8% were co-habiting couples and 7.9% were lone parents. A 2010 assessment estimated that the town had a population of 49,560. It then had increased to 49,709 by the time of the 2011 UK Census, which then increased to 51,117 at the 2022 census. The total population in the wider Kirkcaldy area was estimated at 59,784 in 2016, with a projected increase of 18% by 2026. The number of households in the Kirkcaldy area in 2016 was recorded at 29,246; 67% of which were owner occupied, 27% social rented and 5% private rented. 36% of people live alone and 16.1% are on a low income. The median weekly income is calculated at £335 for the area.

The place of birth of the town's residents was 96.52% United Kingdom (including 87.15% from Scotland), 0.28% Republic of Ireland, 1.18% from other European Union countries, and 1.86% from elsewhere in the world. The economic activity of residents aged 16–74 was 40.13% in full-time employment, 12.17% in part-time employment, 4.79% self-employed, 5.68% unemployed, 2.57% students with jobs, 3.06% students without jobs, 15.70% retired, 5.51% looking after home or family, 6.68% permanently sick or disabled, and 3.71% economically inactive for other reasons. Compared with the average demography of Scotland, Kirkcaldy has low proportions of immigrants, and has higher proportions for people over 75 years old.

In 2010, more than 7,000 people claimed benefits in the Kirkcaldy area; around 90 fewer than in 2009 but 500 more than the pre-recession average for 2008. Recent Scottish Index of Multiple Deprivation (SIMD) figures indicate that the most deprived datazone in Fife is Gallatown and Sinclairtown which has a rank of 82, meaning that it is amongst the 5% most deprived areas in Scotland. Linktown, Seafield, Hayfield, Smeaton and Templehall East areas in Kirkcaldy fall within the 5–10% banding of most deprived communities in Scotland.

In June 2017, there was a recorded 1,000 Jobseekers Allowance (JSA) claimants in the Kirkcaldy area representing a 2.8% rate, which was higher than the Fife and Scottish averages.

== Economy ==
Kirkcaldy Industry Employed compared according to UK Census 2011
| | Kirkcaldy Area | Fife | Scotland |
|---|---|---|---|
| Area Committee Total Population (2011) | 59,795 | 366,910 | 5,327,700 |
| All Persons 16–74 in Employment (2011) | 27,040 | 167,326 | 2,516,895 |
| % Primary Industry Employment (2011) | 1.6% | 2.4% | 3.3% |
| % Manufacturing Employment (2011) | 10.1% | 10.0% | 7.7% |
| % Utilities Employment (2011) | 1.2% | 1.4% | 1.6% |
| % Construction Employment (2011) | 8.3% | 8.2% | 8.0% |
| % Wholesale, Retail & Transport Employed (2011) | 21.0% | 18.6% | 19.9% |
| % Accommodation and Food Employed (2011) | 5.3% | 5.6% | 6.3% |
| % ICT Employed (2011) | 2.7% | 3.0% | 2.7% |
| % Finance & Professional Employed (2011) | 18.1% | 19.1% | 20.1% |
| % Public Sector Employed (2011) | 7.4% | 7.8% | 7.0% |
| % Education & Health Employed (2011) | 24.4% | 23.8% | 23.4% |

The first industries to develop in the town were coal mining and salt panning, which date back to the early 16th century. Early manufacturing both in Kirkcaldy and neighbouring Pathhead consisted of coarse cloth and nailmaking; the latter of which went to the Royal Master of Works for repairs at Holyrood Palace until the 17th century. Linen weaving, which began in 1672, became important to the town, with yarn imported from Hamburg and Bremen. The pottery industry, which was originally established in 1714 as an offshoot of the Linktown Brick and Tile Works, was centred around Linktown, Gallatown and Sinclairtown. The Fife Pottery, built by Andrew and Archibald Grey in 1817, produced Wemyss Ware, named after the family who owned Wemyss Castle.

The production of heavy canvas was started in 1828 by Michael Nairn at a small factory. Influenced by a visit to Bristol, Nairn started to make floorcloth at his new factory at Pathhead in 1847, where his company pioneered the use of ovens to season the floorcloth and reduce production times. When the patent belonging to Frederick Walton expired, Nairn's were able to manufacture linoleum from 1877 onwards. Other factories producing floorcloth and later linoleum were established by former employees of Michael Nairn.

Approximately 22,200 people work in the Kirkcaldy area, the majority of which are in Kirkcaldy itself and to a lesser degree in Burntisland. This represents approximately 13.6% of the 163,000 jobs in Fife. The local economy is dominated by service sector businesses. Other important economic sectors in the Kirkcaldy area are retailing and construction with moderate levels of jobs in financial and business services. The largest employer in the town is MGt plc. Other important local employers include NHS Fife, Forbo (vinyl floor coverings), Fife College (education), Whitworths Holdings (flour millers) and Smith Anderson (paper making).

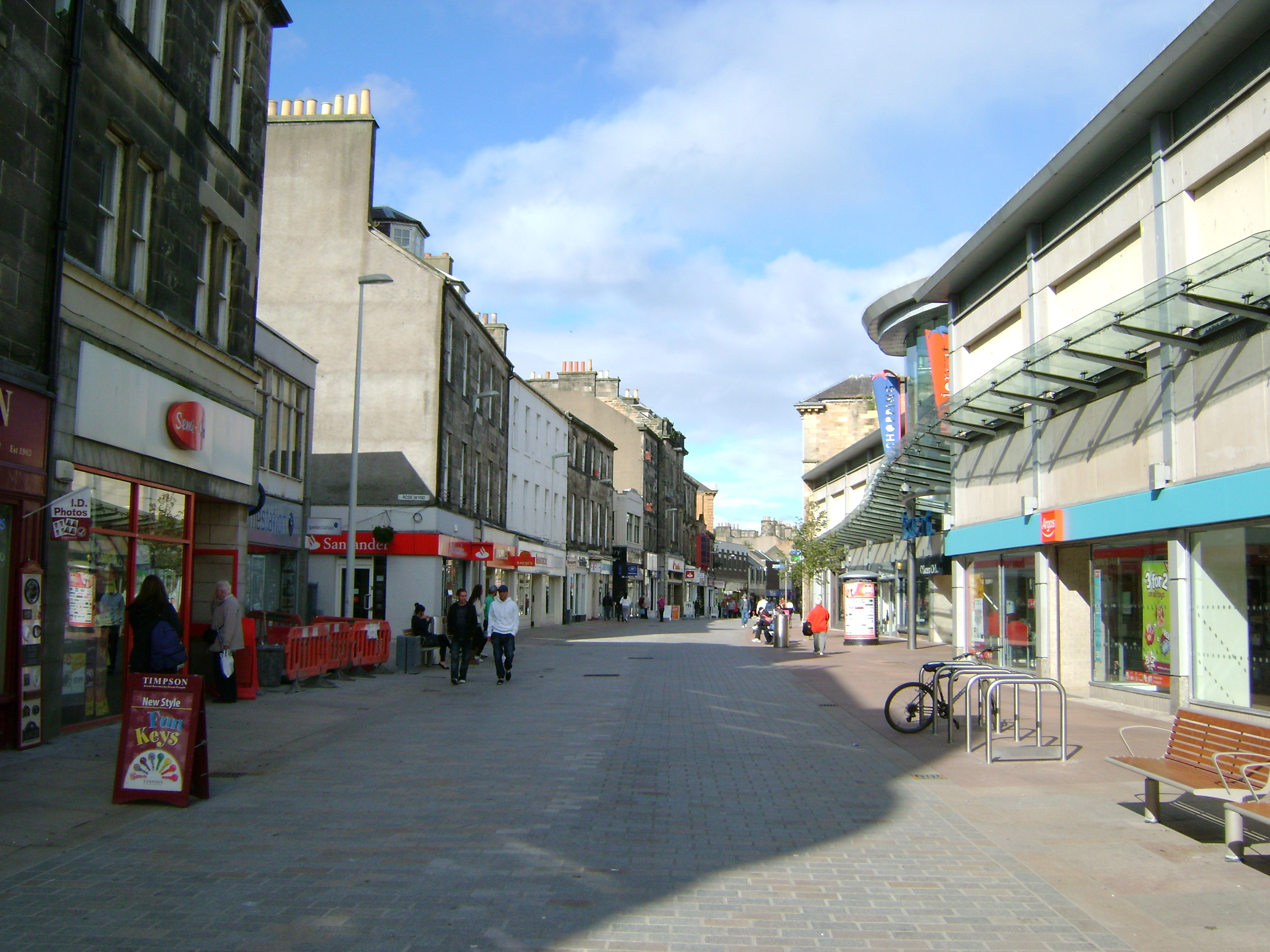
Kirkcaldy's High Street

The principal industrial and business estates include Mitchleston, Randolph, Hayfield, and John Smith Business Park. Local industrial activity has also increased with the reopening in 2011 of Kirkcaldy Harbour to cargo ships. This has been facilitated through a partnership between Forth Ports Ltd (the owners of the harbour), Hutchison's parent company of Carr's Flour Mills, and Transport Scotland, who provided a freight facilities grant of over £800,000. The work included new silos and conveyors to allow fast delivery from coastal ships.

Kirkcaldy's town centre, which serves a large catchment area of around 130,000 residents within a 20-minute drive, is the largest in Fife in terms of retail floor space. Eligible businesses voted in favour of a BID (Business Improvement District) scheme for the town centre in 2010. The High Street, which runs parallel to the Esplanade, is home to the Mercat Shopping Centre. A regeneration programme to upgrade the appearance of the High Street was completed in late 2011. A separate project has also created a 'green corridor' to link the main railway station and bus station with the High Street. The budget for the entire project was £4 million, £2 million of which was provided through the Scottish Government's Town Centre Regeneration Fund.

The town centre was also formerly home to The Postings Shopping Centre, located near the bus station between Hunter Street and Hill Street. It opened in 1981, later declined following several retail closures, and closed permanently in 2021. Demolition began in February 2023, and the site was demolished and cleared later that year for redevelopment."Demolition starts on The Postings Shopping Centre in Kirkcaldy". The Courier. 14 February 2023."The Postings, Kirkcaldy". Cruden Postings.

An out-of-town retail park constructed in 1997 north-west of the town on Chapel Level, off the A92 is home to a number of warehouse retailers. The retail park was purchased by Hammerson, a London-based property developer for £75 million in April 2005.

== Culture ==
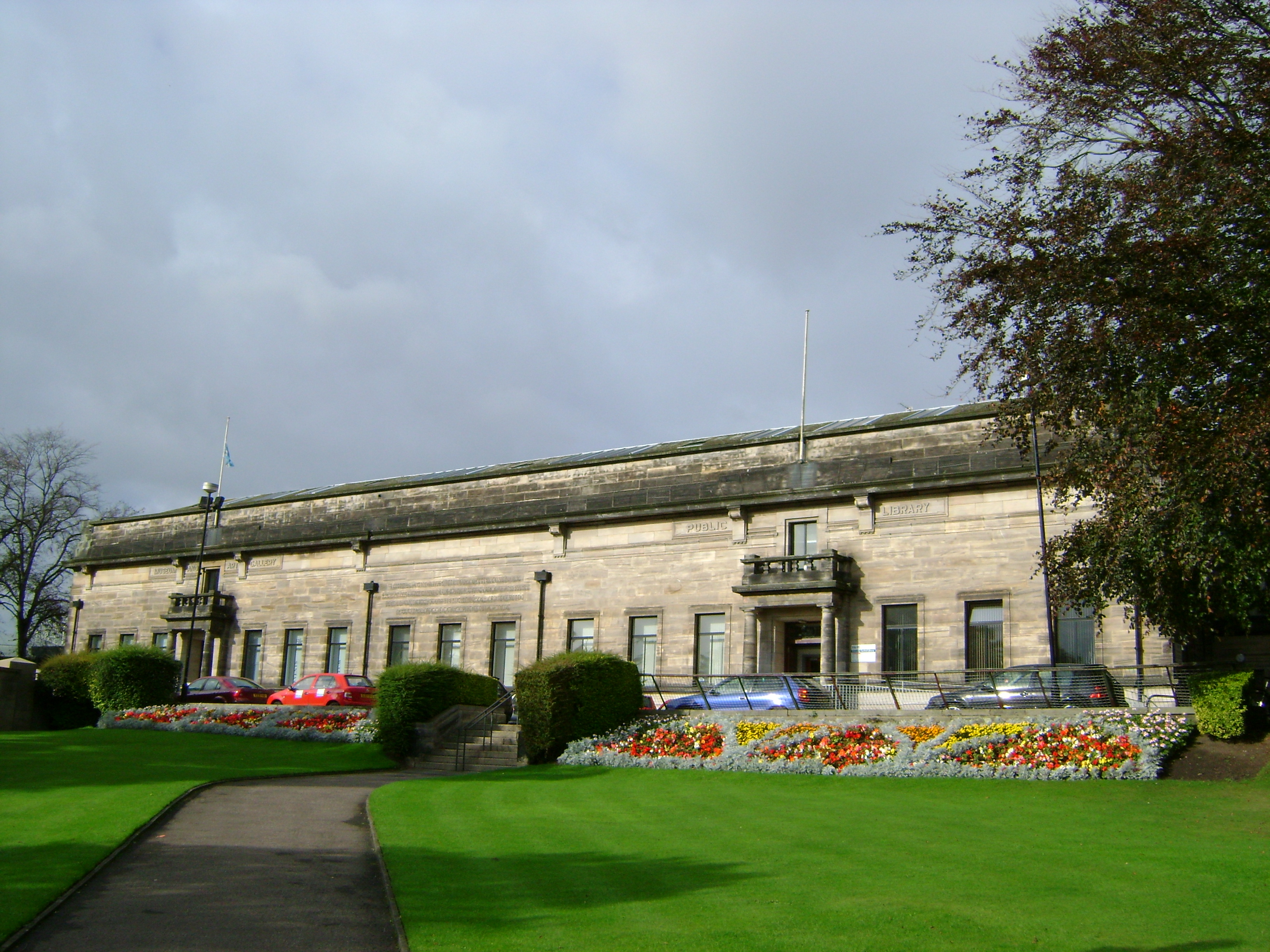
Kirkcaldy Galleries

Kirkcaldy Galleries is home to the town's museum and art gallery and central library. The building opened in 1925 under its former name of Kirkcaldy Museum and Art Gallery and was extended to provide a main library in 1928. In 2011, the building was closed to allow a £2.4 million renovation which was completed in June 2013. The work resulted in the integration of the facilities within the building through a single entrance and reception desk. The building also adopted its present name.

The Adam Smith Theatre, the town's main auditorium, plays host to theatrical and musical productions as well as showing a selection of arthouse and commercial films. Originally known as the Adam Smith Halls, the theatre adopted its present name in 1973 after a renovation of the building in time for the 250th anniversary of the birth of Adam Smith. The King's Theatre, originally opened in 1904 and derelict for some time is currently being redeveloped to become the biggest venue in Fife.

The Links Market originated as a farmers market on Links Street, before moving to its present site in 1903 on the Esplanade (then known as Sands Road). The market visits the town every April and celebrated its 700th anniversary in 2004. Kirkcaldy has had a twin-town link with Ingolstadt in Germany since September 1962. There are plans for a joint celebration to recognise the 50th anniversary of the town's twinning with Ingolstadt in 2012.

There are three main public parks in Kirkcaldy.

Beveridge Park, to the west of the town is a 104 acres (420,000 m^{2}) park created from the existing Robbie's Park, and land purchased from the Raith Estate. This was part of a £50,000 bequest from linen manufacturer and provost Michael Beveridge, who died in 1890. On 24 September 1892 a crowd of over 10,000 came to see the park's opening hosted by his widow, the provost, magistrates, and the town council of the royal burgh. The park includes a boating lake, a formal garden with fountain, a skateboard park, rugby ground, football pitches and woodland walks. The park was awarded a green flag award in both 2010 and 2011. Kirkcaldy parkrun has been held every Saturday in the park since February 2015.

Ravenscraig Park, to the east of the town was formed from the estate of Dysart House. The grounds were bequeathed to the town by the linoleum manufacturer Sir Michael Nairn in 1929. It is adjacent to Ravenscraig Castle.

Dunnikier Park, to the north of the town, purchased by the town council in 1945, consists of an area around Dunnikier House and is home to many woodland walkways. Dunnikier House was built around 1790 for James Townsend Oswald, M.P.

== Religion ==
There are several places of worship in Kirkcaldy including:

Church of Scotland

- Abbotshall
- Bennochy
- Linktown linked with Auchtertool
- Pathhead
- St Bryce Kirk
- Templehall, Torbain and Viewforth linked with Thornton

Roman Catholic

- St Marie's
- St Pius X

Baptist

- Whyte's Causeway Baptist Church
- Pathhead Baptist Church

Other Churches

- Connect Church
- Kirkcaldy Free Church
- Newcraigs Evangelical Church
- Redeemed Christian Church of God
- St Peter's Episcopal Church
- Kingdom Hall of Jehovah's Witnesses

Islam

- Kirkcaldy Central Mosque

== On film and TV ==
- Unveiling of Kirkcaldy War Memorial (c1925) 10 mins – Kirkcaldy crowds and soldiers between the wars.
- Road Races (1951–1952) 15 mins – Includes shots from Beveridge Park.
- Kirkcaldy Youth Pageant (1952) 12 mins – Includes the Lang Toun Lass and Laddie with "Groucho Marx"
- The Scottish footballer of the year (1957) Willie McNaught of Raith Rovers
- The Queen Among Miners (1958) Includes shots of Queen Elizabeth II in a white boiler suit at Rothes Colliery.
- Fine Floors (c1963) 26 mins – A promotional film for the linoleum manufacturers, Michael Nairn and Company Ltd. See also this derivative.
- Kirkcaldy (1975) 22 mins – Guided by a cartoon disc jockey, the film looks at the Fife town of Kirkcaldy
- The 700th (2005) 56 mins – The 7th centenary of the Links Market
- The Town that Floored the World (first shown: BBC2 21 May 2018) 1 hour – Kirkcaldy and the linoleum industry.

== Sport and leisure ==
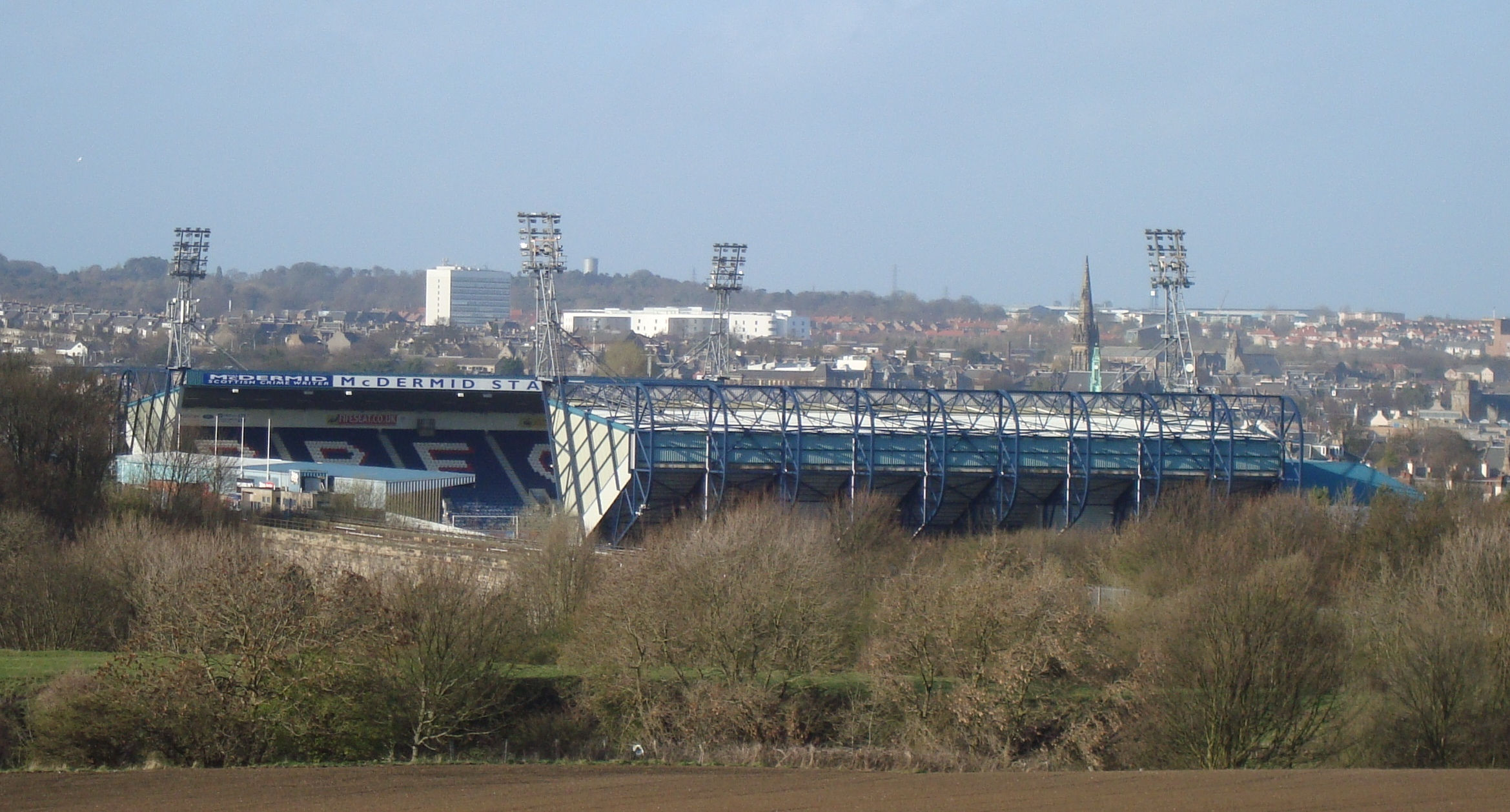
Stark's Park, home ground of Raith Rovers

Raith Rovers F.C. is the town's professional football team. They play in the Scottish Championship, the second tier of Scottish football, at their Stark's Park ground. Founded in 1883, the club were elected to the Scottish Football League in 1902. They reached their highest league position in the 1921–22 season, when they were placed third in the Scottish Football League. They achieved a British scoring record of 142 goals in 34 matches in the 1937–38 season. Under manager Jimmy Nicholl, the team were promoted to the Scottish Premier Division as Division One champions in the 1994–95 season. In 1994 the club won their first national trophy, when they defeated Celtic 6–5 on penalties after finishing the game 2–2, to win the League Cup. This gained them qualification to the UEFA Cup in the following season, where they reached the second round before losing to Bayern Munich.

The other senior football team, Kirkcaldy & Dysart, play at Denfield Park and compete in the East of Scotland League First Division, having moved from the Junior leagues in 2020. Kirkcaldy United were also a senior team based in the town, which dissolved in 1916.

Kirkcaldy RFC are the senior rugby team and play at Beveridge Park in Scottish National League Division Two, the third tier of Scottish club rugby. Fife Flyers, established in 1938, are the oldest ice hockey team in the United Kingdom. The team, who play at the Fife Ice Arena, have been members of the Elite League since the 2011–12 season. Dunnikier Cricket Club play at Dunnikier Park and a flag football club play at Beveridge Park. The town has a range of leisure facilities such as a swimming pool, an ice rink, and two golf courses (Kirkcaldy and Dunnikier). In August 2019, Kirkcaldy held its first half marathon in nearly thirty years.

Fife Steel Basketball Club are Kirkcaldy's only BasketballScotland affiliated basketball club. Steel offer a number of age groups within the club and play in numerous National and Regional level competitions. Currently, the club are represented in both the Lothian Basketball League and Basketball Tayside and Fife League - both 3rd tier competitions.

A new £15 million leisure centre on the town's Esplanade opened its doors in September 2013. This has replaced the old Kirkcaldy Swimming Pool from the 1970s. The decision to build a new leisure centre on this site was controversial, as it resulted in the loss of a public car park. A petition organised by the campaign group Save The Car Park collected over 7,000 signatures in favour of keeping the car park open. The group said that the closure of the car park would discourage shoppers from coming to the High Street and raised issues over the loss of shopowners' right of access to the car park. This decision was severely criticised in an internal audit report.

Local running clubs include Kirkcaldy Wizards, which is both a JogScotland group and the Kirkcaldy area training group for Fife Athletic Club.

== Landmarks ==
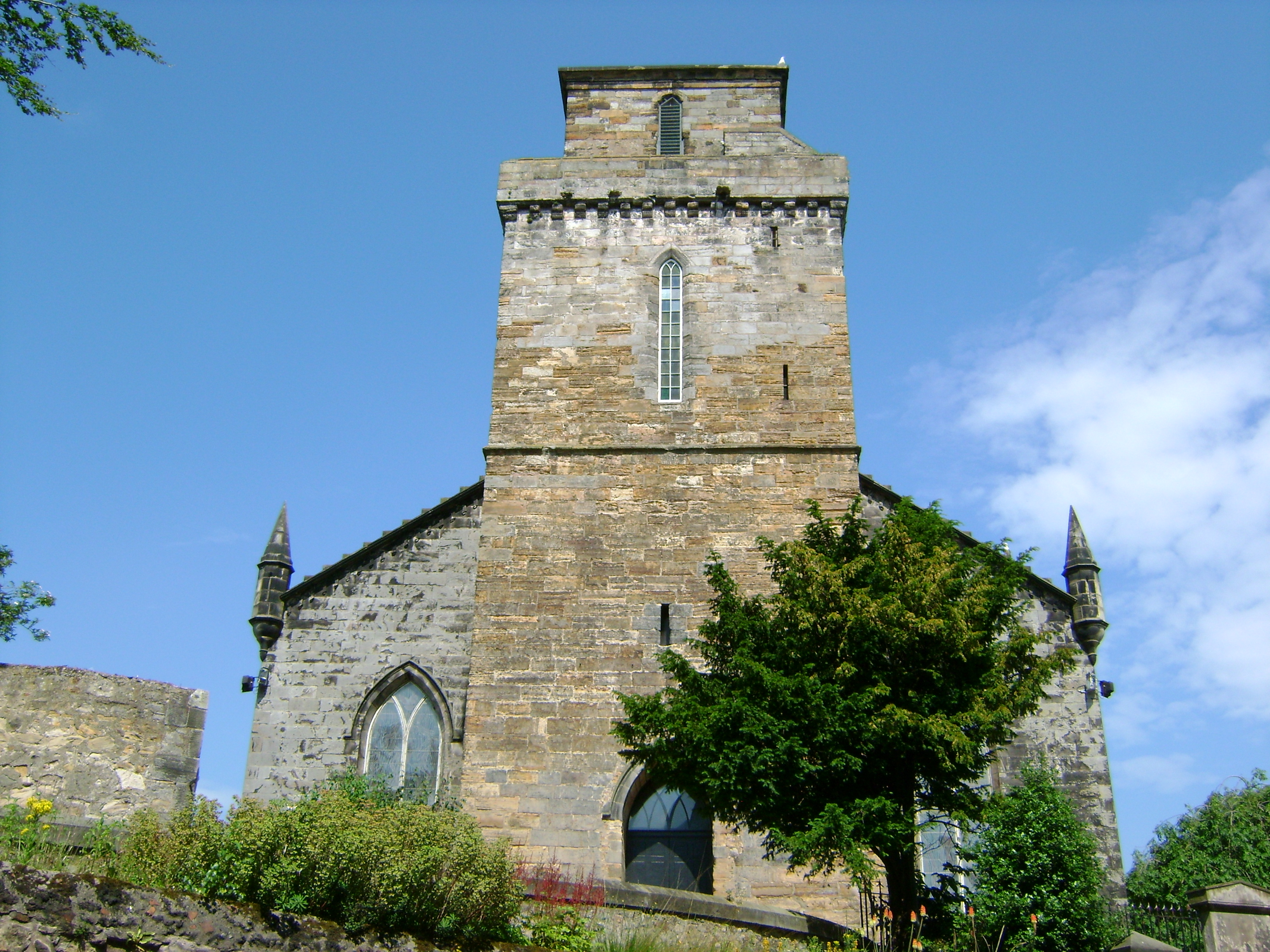
Square Norman (west) tower of the Old Kirk

The oldest church in Kirkcaldy is the Old Kirk, the old parish church, on Kirk Wynd. The earliest mention of the Old Kirk is the record of its consecration in 1244 to St Brisse and St Patrick by David de Bernham, Bishop of St Andrews. The deterioration of the building in the late 18th century was addressed by major renovations to the main body of the church between 1807 and 1808. Only the square western tower, which dates from around 1500, was retained and is now the oldest building to have survived within the old burgh. In 2000 the Old Kirk was amalgamated with St Brycedale Church and was closed for public worship in 2008. It has since been re-opened by the Old Kirk Trust and is used for musical and dramatic performances. Other significant churches in the town include St Bryce Kirk built between 1877 and 1881 by James Matthews at the corner of St Brycedale Avenue and Kirk Wynd; Abbotshall Parish Church on Abbotshall Road, the current building completed in 1788 and Linktown Church built in 1830–1 by George Hay on Bethlefield Place.

Kirkcaldy Town House on Wemyssfield is the centrepiece of the town's main civic square. The building was designed in the late 1930s by David Carr and William Howard of Edinburgh. With the advent of World War II, work was delayed on the building until 1950. Construction was split into two phases: the west wing, which was completed in 1953, and the east wing, completed in 1956.

Kirkcaldy War Memorial in War Memorial Gardens unveiled in 1925 was gifted to the town by John Nairn, linoleum manufacturer and grandson of Michael Nairn. It was dedicated to Ian Nairn, the son of John Nairn who died in the First World War. A Second World War memorial, designed by Thomas Hubbard, was later added and unveiled in 1958. The memorial commemorates the lives of 1,012 people from the First World War and 452 from the Second World War. Forming a centre piece to these gardens is Kirkcaldy Galleries, formerly known as Kirkcaldy Museum and Art Gallery, which was also donated by Nairn.

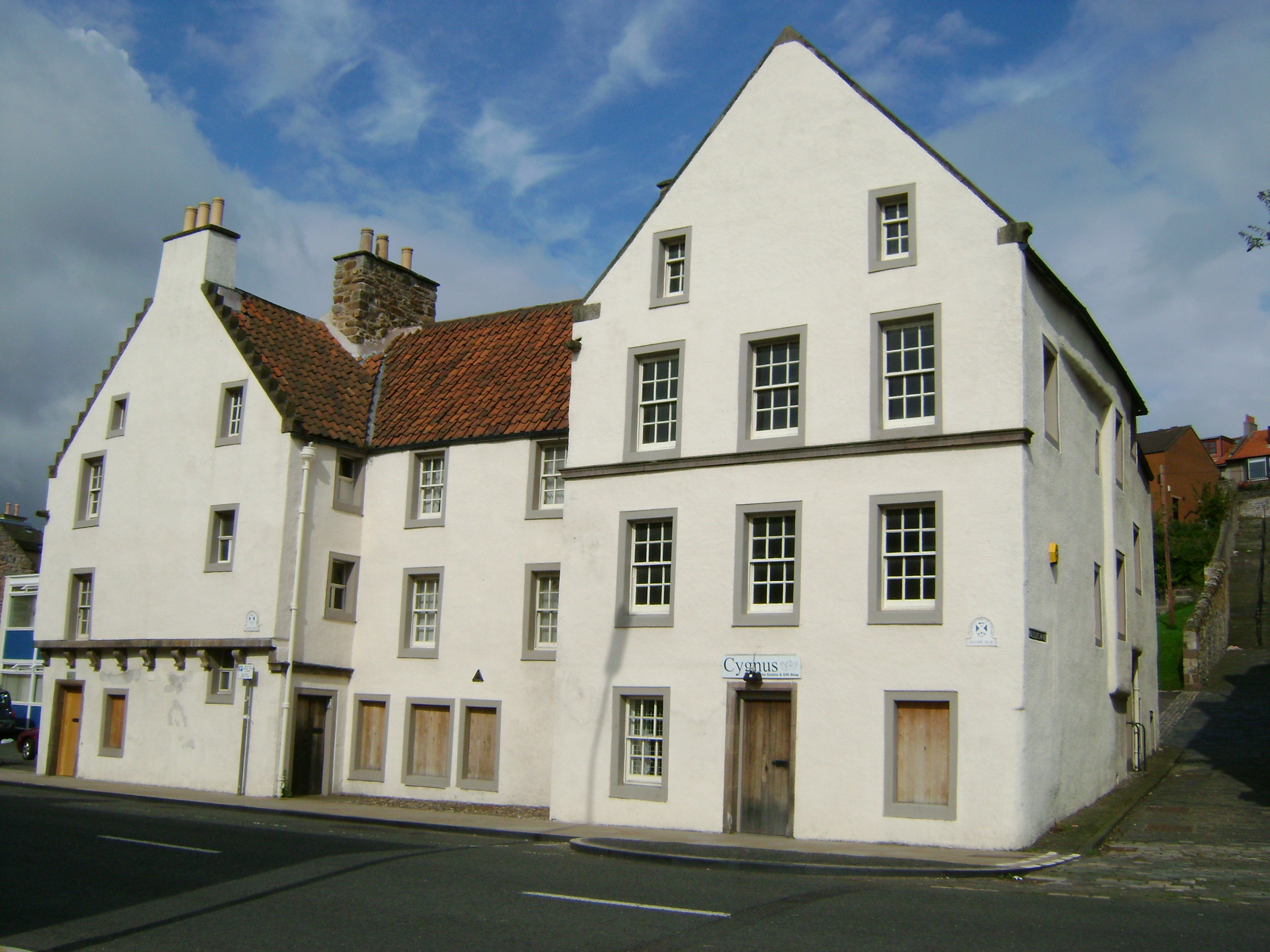
Sailors' Walk

In the north-east are two homes of early wealthy merchants and shipowners connected with Kirkcaldy's harbour. The Merchant's House or Law's Close at 339–343 High Street; once owned by the Law family, is one of the best surviving examples of a 16th-century town house in Scotland. Sailors' Walk, at 443–449 High Street; consists of two 17th-century houses, resting on foundations dating back to around 1460. These two houses were once divided into four dwellings; three of which were owned by the Oliphant family and the fourth by James Ferguson of Raith.

North of the harbour area, on The Path, are two examples of distinctive architectural styles. Hutchison's House was designed by George Spears, the owner of the nearby East Bridge distillery, in 1793. Path House, originally known as Dunnikier House, is a three-storey L-plan tower house designed by John Watson in 1692 for his bride, Euphan Orrock. In 1703 Watson sold the house to the Oswald family, who had important links with the town.

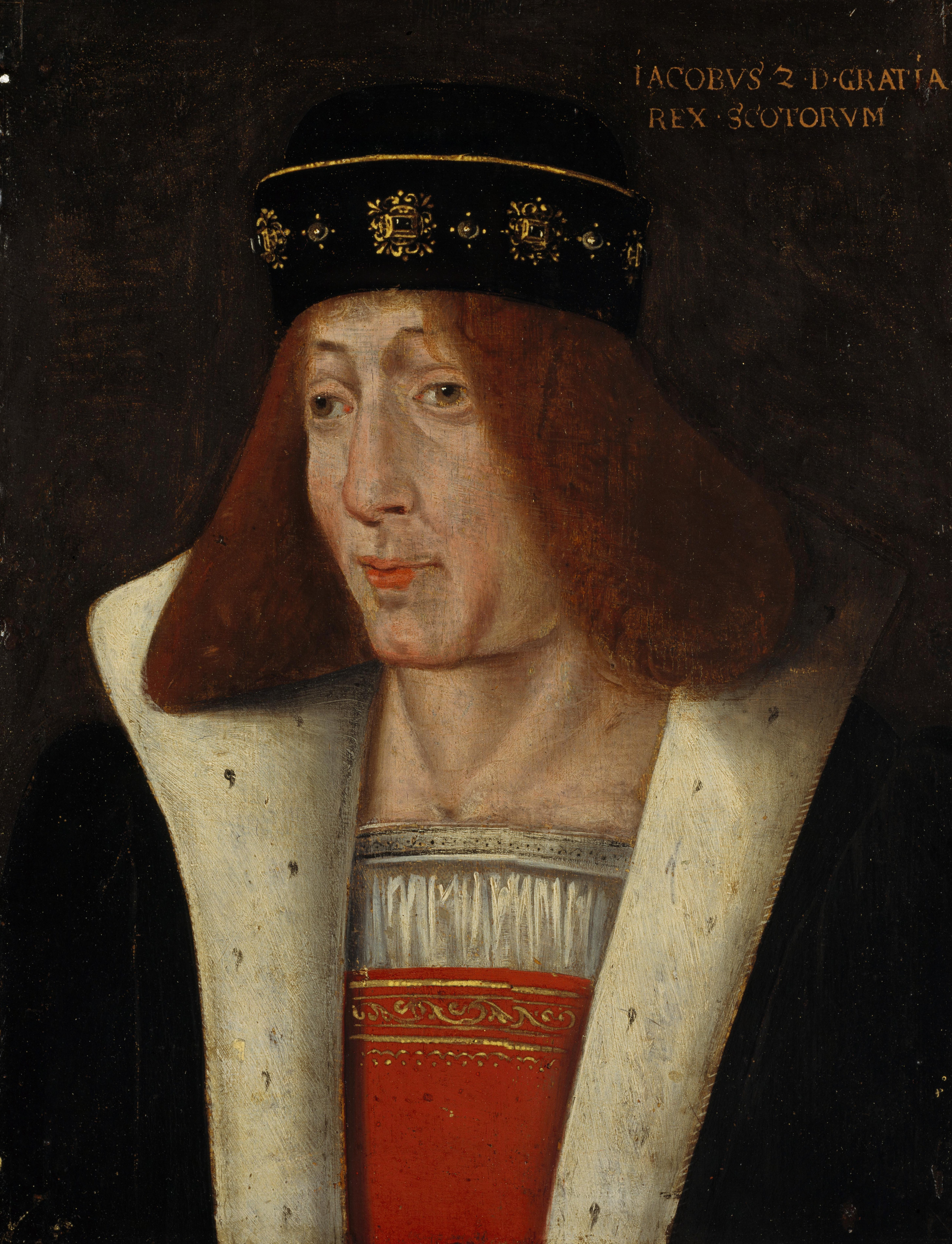
James II of Scotland ordered the building of Ravenscraig Castle, which was completed by his widow Mary of Guelders.

Two large stately homes also exist within the town. To the north of Kirkcaldy is Dunnikier House, built in the late 18th century as a seat for the Oswald family, replacing their previous residence at Path House. To the south-west of Kirkcaldy is Raith House, built in the late 17th century by Sir Alexander Raith, 4th Earl of Raith and Melville, for his wife, Barbara Dundas. The house remains a private residence of the Munro-Ferguson family.

To the east of the town are the ruins of Ravenscraig Castle on a rocky spit of land extending into the Firth of Forth. King James II began construction of the castle in 1460 for his queen, Mary of Guelders. It was also a means of defending the upper reaches of the Forth, including the port of Dysart. To a lesser extent it protected the harbour of Kirkcaldy against piracy and English rivalry. Ravenscraig is one of the earliest British castles designed to defend against and use artillery, an innovation demonstrated by the massive walls, the regularly placed shot holes, and the deep rock-cut ditch. Following the death of the King at the siege of Roxburgh Castle (1460), work continued on Ravenscraig, and it became a home for Mary of Gueldres until her death in 1463. In 1470 King James III granted the castle and lands to William Sinclair, Earl of Orkney and Caithness, in exchange for the castle in Kirkwall and the right to the Earldom of Orkney.

== Education ==
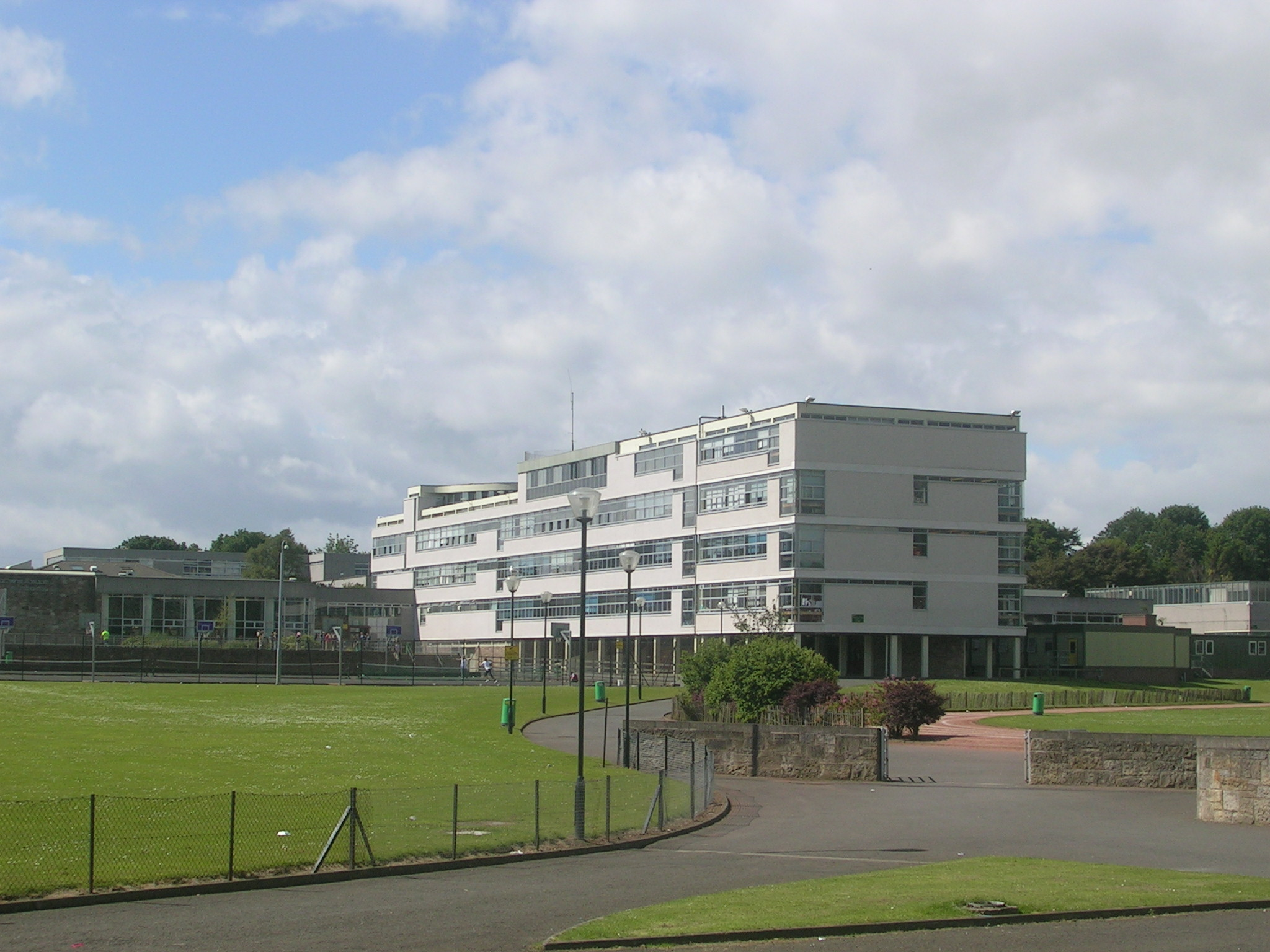
Balwearie High School

The first school to be established in the town was Kirkcaldy Burgh School in 1582, a grammar school, with the local minister, Dr David Spens, as principal. Until premises were found, pupils were taught in the minister's house. Notable pupils include Robert Adam and Adam Smith. The school was located at Hill Street before being rehoused in a new building on St Brycedale Avenue in 1843. A Government list of 1872 described the school as being of 'higher class'. A new building for the school was given to the town in 1893 by Michael Barker Nairn, a linen manufacturer. Other schools were established in the town, including girls schools, subscription schools, and apprentice schools. The passing of the Education (Scotland) Act in 1872 replaced voluntary education in the town with a school-based education for all children aged 5 to 13.

Kirkcaldy has four secondary schools and eleven primary schools. Other educational facilities include a private school and a school for children with learning difficulties. Kirkcaldy High School, the oldest secondary school, serves pupils living in the north of the town and has occupied a site on Dunnikier Way since 1958. Balwearie High School opened as a junior secondary school in 1964 and was upgraded to a high school in 1972. The school serves pupils living in the western end of the town and neighbouring Kinghorn and Burntisland. Viewforth High School, which opened in 1908, was also initially a junior secondary school, but upgraded to a high school in 1980. Plans have been approved to build a new secondary school for Kirkcaldy East at the site of the Windmill Road Playing Fields. Work will be funded through the Building Fife's School Project for completion in August 2016. St Andrews RC High School, which opened in the late 1950s is one of two Roman Catholic secondary schools in Fife. This caters to pupils living in the eastern half of Fife, from St Andrews to Burntisland and Lochgelly.

Further education is provided by Fife College who have their main campus on St Brycedale Avenue. The college was created in August 2013 from the merger of Adam Smith College, Fife and Carnegie College, Dunfermline. The University of Dundee also has a campus in the town which specialises as a School for Nursing and Midwifery. Originally built by the Fife Health Board for the use of the old Fife College of Further and Higher Education, this campus was taken over by the university in 1996.

== Public services ==
Waste management is handled by the local authority, Fife Council. Kerbside recycling operates in the town. A four-bin collection is in place for the majority of residents. Kirkcaldy has one recycling centre and several recycling points, all operated by Fife Council. Non-hazardous waste is sent to landfill at Lochhead near Dunfermline, and Lower Melville Wood, near Ladybank.

Health care is supplied by NHS Fife, who have their main headquarters in the town at Hayfield House. The Victoria Hospital which is situated north of the town centre, is the town's acute general and maternity hospital. A new £152.5 million 530,000 sq ft (49,000 m^{2}) extension to the hospital was completed in February 2012. This new wing contains a maternity unit, children's department, 11 operating theatres and a new Accident and Emergency Department. Within the grounds of the hospital, a Maggie's Centre, under the name of Maggie's Fife, specialises in care for cancer patients. The centre, which was completed between 2004 and 2006, was the first building in the UK designed by Zaha Hadid, the Iraqi-born architect. Whyteman's Brae Hospital, which is also part of the complex, serves psychiatric and elderly patients.

Statutory emergency fire and rescue services are provided by the Scottish Fire and Rescue Service. The main fire station in the town is on Dunnikier Road. Policing in Kirkcaldy is operated by Police Scotland. The main police station in the town is on St Brycedale Avenue. Kirkcaldy is also served by the East Central Region of the Scottish Ambulance Service, which covers Tayside, Forth Valley, and Fife.

== Media ==
There are three radio stations in the town. Kingdom FM broadcasts from its studios at Elizabeth House in the town. Victoria Radio Network a hospital radio station based in Victoria Hospital and K107, a community radio station.

== Transport ==
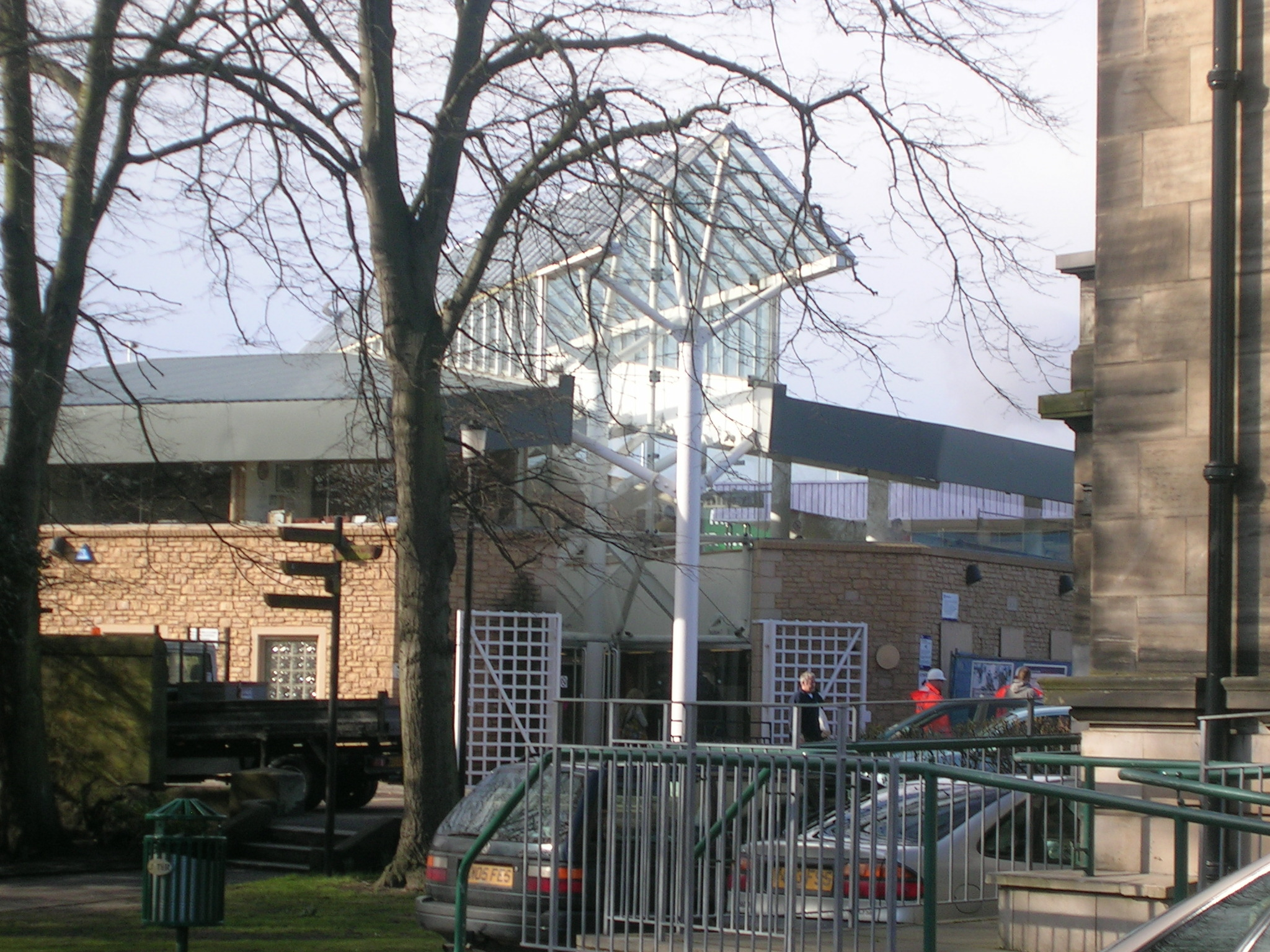
Main entrance (south platform), Kirkcaldy railway station

=== Railway ===
Kirkcaldy railway station is to the north-west of the town centre and is on the route for the Fife Circle Line and the East Coast Main Line.

Other services run to locations such as Aberdeen and Inverness to the north, and south as far as London King's Cross and Penzance. Nearby stations such as Burntisland and Kinghorn are to the south and west of the town.

=== Roads ===
The A92, which connects Dunfermline to the west with Glenrothes and Dundee to the north, passes immediately north of Kirkcaldy. The A910 road connects it to the western and central parts of the town. At Redhouse roundabout, the A921 connects the A92 to the eastern side of Kirkcaldy. It continues via St Clair Street and The Esplanade on to Kinghorn, Burntisland, and Aberdour to the south-west. The main route through the north of the town, the B981, runs roughly parallel to and one kilometre to the south of the A92. This road also connects to the A910 and the A921, from Chapel Junction via Chapel Level and Dunnikier Way to Gallatown. From here the A915, known locally as the Standing Stane Road, connects the town to St Andrews and Leven to the north-east. The A955 runs along the coast from Dysart to East Wemyss and Buckhaven to the north-east.

=== Buses ===
The main bus station, next to where the Postings Shopping Centre once stood, is located between Hill Place and Hunter Street.

== Notable residents ==
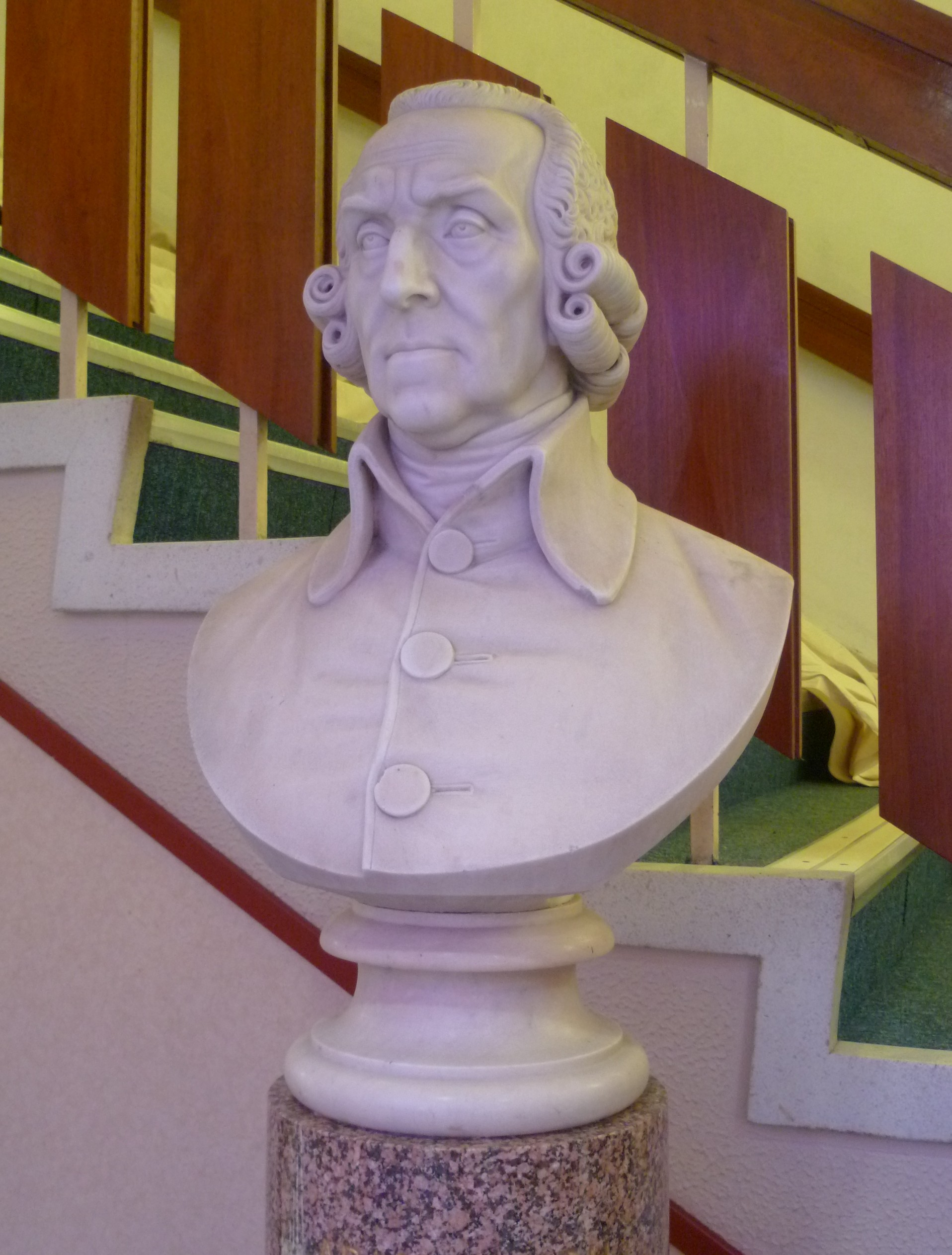
Bust of Adam Smith in the town's theatre named in his honour

Kirkcaldy is the birthplace of social philosopher and economist Adam Smith, who wrote The Wealth of Nations at his mother's house at 220 High Street between 1765 and 1767. Architect and designer Robert Adam (and his father, William) came from the town. Sir Sandford Fleming, (1827–1915), engineer and inventor behind the development of worldwide standard time zones and who worked on much of the Intercolonial Railway and the Canadian Pacific Railway was born in the town before emigrating to Canada. Explorer John McDouall Stuart, who led six expeditions into the centre and from the south to north of Australia, was born in nearby Dysart.

Politicians who come from the town include Henry Balnaves (ca.1512–1570) a Scottish politician, Lord Justice Clerk and religious reformer; Ronald Munro Ferguson, the Governor-General of Australia from 1914 to 1920; David Steel, leader of the Liberal Party from 1979 to 1988 and former Presiding Officer of the Scottish Parliament; and Bertha Wilson, the first female judge of the Supreme Court of Canada and Court of Appeal for Ontario. The former Chancellor of the Exchequer, Prime Minister and MP for the town's constituency until his retirement in 2015, Gordon Brown, was brought up in the town from the age of three.

The mathematician Edward Sang was born in Kirkcaldy in 1805.

Patrick Don Swan (1808–1889) founder of Swan Brothers shipbuilders. Son of William Swan, Provost of Kirkcaldy. Patrick served as Provost of Kirkcaldy for 37 years and was its most prominent person through most of the 19th century.

The Scottish crime writer Val McDermid was born in the town.

Guy Berryman, bassist of the alternative rock band Coldplay, was born and brought up in the town until the age of thirteen.

Richard Park, the chief executive of Global Radio and the headmaster on the BBC talent show Fame Academy was born in the town.

Sportsmen include the two-time world darts champion Jocky Wilson, footballer Colin Cameron, professional golfer Peter Whiteford, professional ice hockey player Adam Walker and stock car driver Gordon Moodie. William Arnott (1827–1901), a biscuit manufacturer in Australia, also came from the town. David Potter, sports historian and author, was not born in Kirkcaldy but has lived there for over 40 years. David Danskin, who grew up in Kirkcaldy, was a principal founding member of Dial Square FC, later renamed Royal Arsenal, the team that are today known as Arsenal. Raith Rovers F.C. footballer Lewis Stevenson was born in Kirkcaldy. He is the only footballer in the history of his former club Hibs to have won both the Scottish League Cup and Scottish Cup, in 2007 and 2016 respectively. He made more than 300 appearances for the Edinburgh club before moving to Raith Rovers.

Frederick Coutts (1899–1986), the 8th General, or international leader, of the Salvation Army was born in Kirkcaldy.

The eminent zoologist, Prof David Raitt Robertson Burt (1899–1983) was born and raised in Kirkcaldy, as was the botanist John Muirhead Macfarlane FRSE (1855–1943).

The Very Rev John Drysdale, twice Moderator of the Church of Scotland (1773 and 1784) was born and raised in Kirkcaldy.

Prof Carstairs Cumming Douglas physician and hygienist was born in Kirkcaldy. He was largely the man responsible for introducing the obligatory use of Carbolic soap throughout Scottish schools in 1907.

Sir David Christie Martin (1914–1976) born and raised in Kirkcaldy.

Dave Dryburgh was born in Kirkcaldy in 1908. He later became a sports journalist and was inducted into the Canadian Football Hall of Fame.

The artist Frances Walker was born in Kirkcaldy in 1930.

== Twin town ==
- Ingolstadt, Germany
