= Floorcloth =

Household furnishing

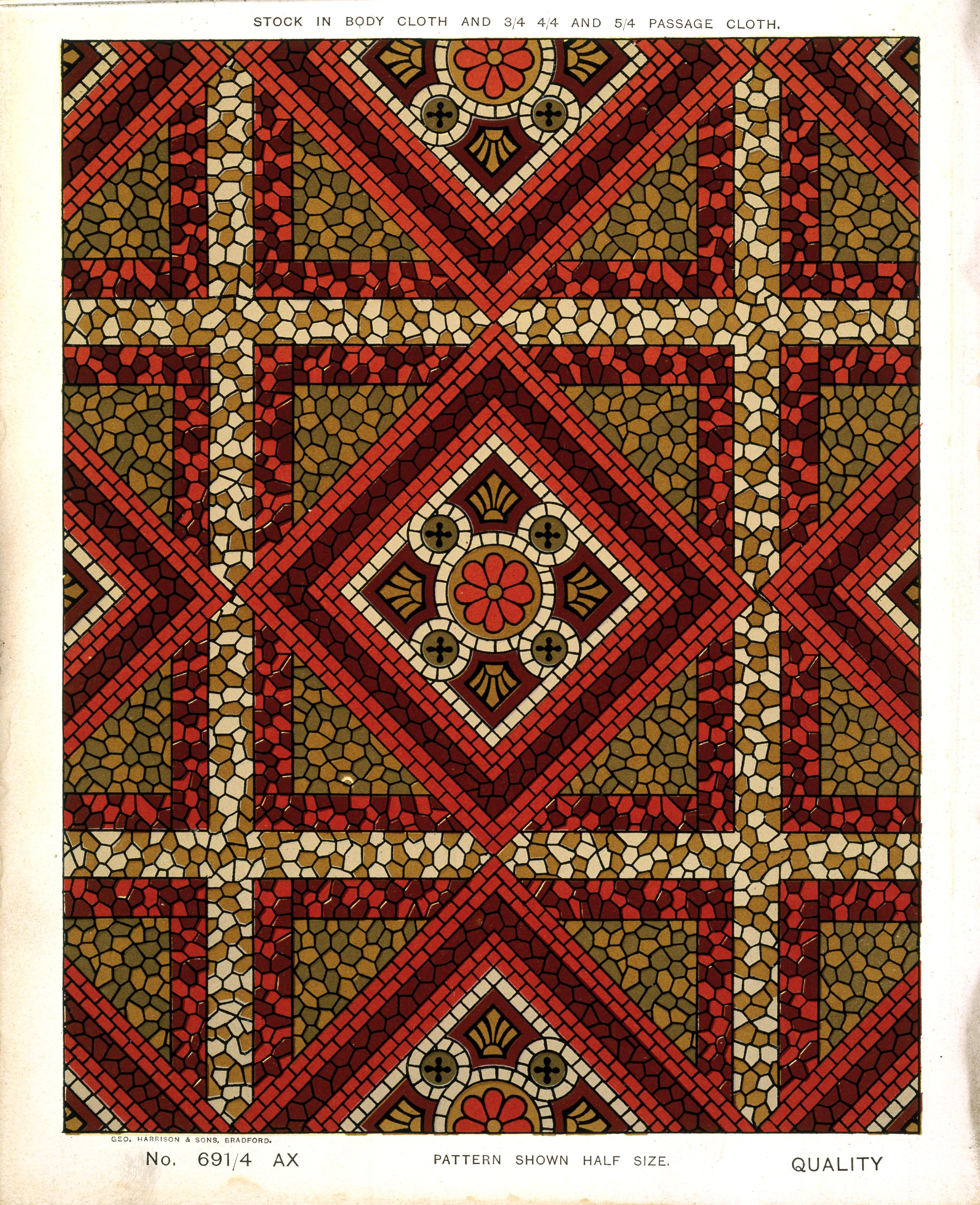
Floorcloth in a geometric tile pattern from George Harrison and Co., possibly 1880s

A floorcloth, or floor-cloth, is a household furnishing used for warmth, decoration, or to protect expensive carpets. They were primarily produced and used from the early 18th to the early 20th century and were also referred to as oilcloth, wax cloths, and painted canvas. Some still use floorcloths as a customizable alternative to rugs, and some artists have elected to use floorcloths as a medium of expression. Most modern floorcloths are made of heavy, unstretched canvas with two or more coats of gesso. They are then painted and varnished to make them waterproof.

== History ==
Floorcloths had their start in 18th century England, and may have evolved from painted wall tapestries from the 1500s. Textiles were too costly to be used on the floor at that time. From 1578 to 1694 a number of British patents were issued for treating cloth with an oil-type of covering, but it is not known if these were for floor coverings. A British receipt from 1722 refers to "a floor oyled cloth," indicating that they were being used underfoot at that time

A London painter and stainer, Nathan Smith, was issued a patent in 1763 for waxed cloth specifically as a floor covering. His recipe for the liquid coating included resin, tar, Spanish brown, beeswax and linseed oil. He set up a factory in Knightsbridge, in London, where the waxed cloth was manufactured and painted, initially freehand or with stencils, but later with wallpaper printing blocks.

When American colonists became independent from England, they also began to create their own floorcloths. The first three US presidents, George Washington, John Adams, and Thomas Jefferson all used floorcloths, and Jefferson had plain green ones in the White House. It is hard to place a standard value on floorcloths, as they varied so much in cost and quality. While some were made at home, commercially-produced floor cloths were to be found in shops: in Boston, Samuel Perkins & Sons advertised "painted floor cloths or canvass carpets" in 1816, when they could be purchased for anywhere from $1.37 to $2.25 per square yard. In addition, some itinerant painters traveling in rural areas would sell their services as floorcloth painters.

When floorcloths became worn, they were often cut up and reused in less prominent places in the home, and might even be later cut up further for use in small spaces such as closets or pantries. Thus, old floorcloths are not often found in museums, and rarely are found in the possession of collectors.

== Uses ==
Floorcloths served several purposes: they protected floors, decorated a room, and also helped to insulate a space. Floorcloths might be covered with a carpet during cold weather, or might themselves have straw or newspaper put underneath them to help to keep the cold out.

Historical floorcloths varied in size. They might cover a smaller space as an area rug does today, they might be of a size to reach wall to wall, or they might be of a size to be placed under a dining table to protect a costly carpet. These small protective floorcloths were called "covers" in the 18th century and "druggets" in the 19th.

== Design ==
Initially used by the wealthy, the designs and patterns mimicked a range of other substances, including parquet flooring, tile, and marble. As these useful furnishings found their way into middle-class homes, the variety of patterns grew. The painting of floorcloths might be done at home, by professional painters, or in a factory, and thus the quality, intricacy, and value of the floorcloths varied enormously. Freehand painting of the cloths gave way to printed and stenciled patterns, and the stenciled floorcloths might be very intricate. One floorcloth at the Melrose Plantation in Natchez Mississippi mimicked an intensively patterned Brussels carpet.

== Waning use of floorcloths ==
By the end of the 19th century, the single term still in use to refer to floorcloths was oil cloth. New materials and processes began to provide some competition for oil cloths, although they did continue to be produced through the early 20th century. A patent was issued in 1844 for kamptulicon, which was well regarded in Great Britain, but did not see much use in the United States. Interest in kamptulicon encouraged more experimentation. One result was the issuance of a patent to Frederick Walton in 1863 for linoleum. Both oil cloth and linoleum were being produced in the same factories, with linoleum more aggressively marketed.

Over the past few decades, the inclination to personalize home decor has sparked a renewed interest in floorcloths. Designs are made in a variety of styles and colors, using many techniques. This gives today's floorcloths the ability to be created for any style interior.
