= Kirkcaldy Town House =

Municipal building in Kirkcaldy, Scotland

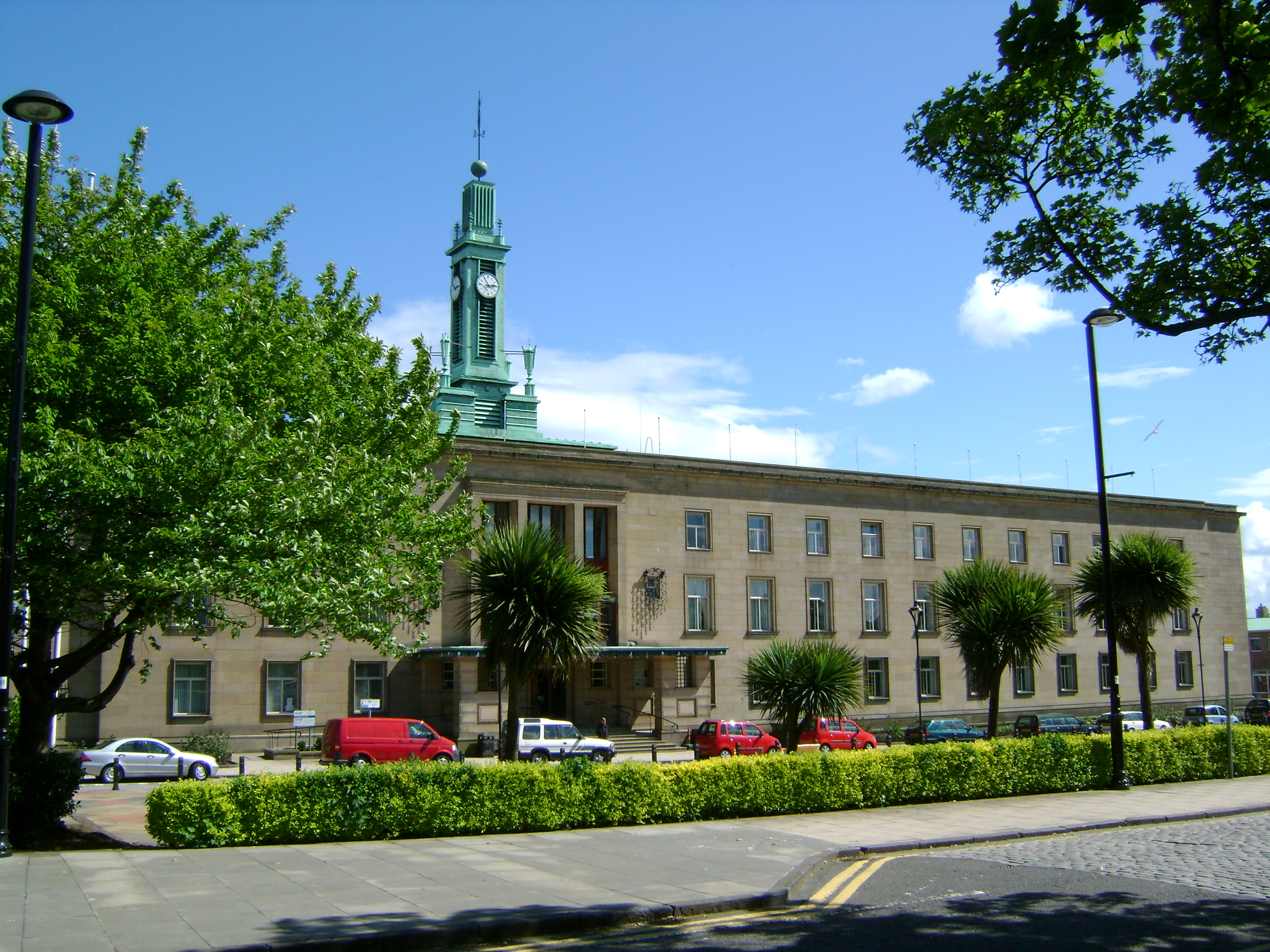
- Kirkcaldy Town House

- Shown in Fife
- 56.109905°N 3.162263°W
- Location: Kirkcaldy

History
- Built: 1956

Site notes
- Architect(s): David Carr and William Howard

Listed Building – Category B
- Designated: 22 March 1988
- Reference no.: LB36387

Kirkcaldy Town House is a Scandinavian influenced town hall located in Kirkcaldy, Fife, Scotland. The current town house was begun in 1937, from a competition-winning design by architects David Carr and William Howard of Edinburgh. Only the foundations had been put in place before construction was interrupted by the Second World War. Work resumed on the building in 1950 and was completed in two separate phases between 1953 and 1956. The town house would serve as the headquarters of Kirkcaldy Town Council from 1956 to 1975 and then Kirkcaldy District Council from 1975 to 1996. Today, the role of the town house is the headquarters of the local area committee of Fife Council. Kirkcaldy Town House is protected as a Category B listed building.

== History ==
Until the 1930s, the main municipal building in Kirkcaldy was the old townhouse and jail at the junction of High Street and Tolbooth Street which was completed in 1826. The old town house on the High Street was demolished in 1935. A site for the new town house was chosen to the north of the town centre, which involved the demolition of three main villas - Adelaide, St Oalfs and Tilehurst - to make space.

Construction of the new town house began in 1939 from a competition-winning design by David Carr and William Howard of Edinburgh. Only the foundations of the building had been put in place before work was interrupted by the Second World War. The nearby Osborne House on East Wemyss Place would serve as a temporary town office, for the time being. Work on the town house resumed in 1950. This was split into two phases: the officers' section and the councillors' section. The first phase (including the officers' section) was opened by James Young, then Secretary of State for Scotland on 6 July 1953. The second and final phase of the building (including the councillors' section and unveiling the statue of "The Sower" by Thomas Whalen) was opened by the town provost, David Wright, on 6 July 1956.

The town council had their first meeting in the new building on 12 November 1956. In 1975, the town house became the headquarters of Kirkcaldy District Council. Today the town house serves as the headquarters of the local area committee of Fife Council.

== Description ==
The town house has been described as having a "flat roofline, rectangular profile and somewhat delicate lintel detail - in addition to neo-classical window spacing and a main facade with spindly belfry steeple". The building has been compared to the Scottish National Library on George IV Bridge in Edinburgh for having a modern style with classical or traditional elements and recognised for Scandinavian influences.

The base of the town house features Darney stone from East Woodburn, with the walls being made from Blaxter stone, both of which were brought north to the town from Northumberland quarries. The surroundings of the main entrance are made of Elverwater stone. The stone on the walls was done by retired masons from around the ages of 65 to 80.

The clock tower which sits on top of the building was designed by David Carr of Edinburgh. The Nordic influenced design depicts St Bryce, the patron saint of Kirkcaldy. A small copper ball, 3 feet (0.91 m) in diameter, at the bottom of the vane, is supposed to represent the world. The figure is located at the top of the 20-foot (6.1 m) weather vane with the intention he can look across the town as the vane turns around in the wind, with the world at his feet. The vane, probably made of wrought iron, was designed by Thomas Hadden of Edinburgh. However, the top part of the spire, including the ball and vane, were removed in 2017 after their weight was found to be damaging the roof.

The Town House contains many symbolic artefacts relating to the region's heritage. At the back of the town house lie six of the seven provost's lamps of the former royal burghs within Kirkcaldy district. The six lamps are from: Kirkcaldy, Burntisland, Kinghorn, Leven, and Buckhaven and Methil. These lamps once stood outside the houses of senior councillors, and were all brought to this site when the royal burghs were abolished in 1975. Only the lamp for Leslie is missing. Around the building, both of the town's two coats of arms can be seen. The spiritual coat of arms showing St Bryce is located at the south entrance and the one which depicts Dunfermline Abbey is at the west entrance. Inside the building itself, displayed across the stairwell is a mural designed by Walter Pritchard of the Glasgow School of Art. This makes references to the industries associated with the town such as linoleum, coal mining and weaving. Other references are to famous people such as Adam Smith and the Adam brothers. Charles II is shown granting the town its royal burgh status in 1644, received by a figure in a Sinclair tartan.

== See also ==
- List of listed buildings in Kirkcaldy, Fife

== Bibliography ==
- Brown, Hamish (1994). The Fife Coast. Mainstream. ISBN 1-85158-608-3.
- Glen, Duncan (2004). Kirkcaldy: A New Illustrated History. Akros Publications. ISBN 0-86142-146-9.
- Durie, Bruce (2002). Kirkcaldy and East Fife. Britain in Old Photographs. History Press. ISBN 978-0-7509-2829-8.
- Pearson, John M. (1993). Around Kirkcaldy. Levenmouth Printers.
- Pride, Glen (1990). The Kingdom of Fife: An Illustrated Architectural Guide. RIAS illustrated architectural guides to Scotland. Rutland Press. ISBN 1-85158-256-8.
