= Kirkcaldy (district) =

Former local government district in Scotland

Coordinates: 56.18°N 3.09°W

- District
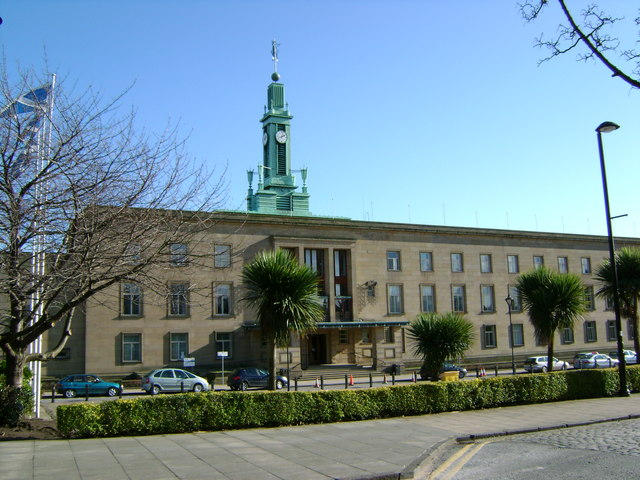
- Kirkcaldy Town House

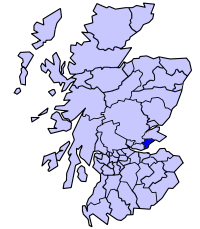
- Kirkcaldy district within Scotland
- Population
  - 1994: 148,450
- History
  - Created: 16 May 1975
  - Abolished: 31 March 1996
  - Succeeded by: (Part of) Fife
- Government: Kirkcaldy District Council
  - HQ: Kirkcaldy

Kirkcaldy (Scottish Gaelic: Dùn Phàrlain, Scots: Dunfaurlin) was a local government district in the Fife region of Scotland from 1975 to 1996. The district was named after the town of Kirkcaldy but also covered a wider area, including the Fife regional capital of Glenrothes.

== History ==
As its name suggests, the district (one of three in the Fife region, along with Dunfermline and North-East Fife) was centred around the town of Kirkcaldy, an important royal burgh in the historic county of Fife, although its boundaries extended some way beyond the town. The district was created in 1975 under the Local Government (Scotland) Act 1973, which established a two-tier structure of local government across mainland Scotland comprising upper-tier regions and lower-tier districts. Kirkcaldy was one of three districts created within the region of Fife along with Dunfermline and North-East Fife. The district covered the whole area of nine former districts and part of two others from the historic county of Fife, which were all abolished at the same time:

- Buckhaven and Methil Burgh
- Burntisland Burgh
- Glenrothes District
- Kinghorn Burgh
- Kirkcaldy Burgh
- Kirkcaldy District (except Gray Park polling district, which went to Dunfermline district)
- Leslie Burgh
- Leven Burgh
- Lochgelly District (electoral divisions of Auchterderran, Denend, Kinglassie, and New Carden only, rest went to Dunfermline district)
- Markinch Burgh
- Wemyss District

Apart from the main built-up area of Kirkcaldy itself, the district therefore encompassed the Levenmouth conurbation, coastal villages such as Burntisland, mining communities including Cardenden, and the expanding new town of Glenrothes which was chosen as the regional capital for Fife and had its own Development Corporation, but was required to seek agreement with the District Council at Kirkcaldy (essentially the rival town) for matters at local level, a situation which frequently caused tensions between the administrations. It had the sixth-largest population of the 53 districts of the era. Other than its two Fife neighbours to the north and south and the North Sea to the east, Kirkcaldy had a short western border with Perth and Kinross district in the Tayside region.

In 1996 Scotland's districts and regions were abolished under the Local Government etc. (Scotland) Act 1994. Fife became a single unitary council area, headquartered in Glenrothes as the regional council had also been. Similar boundaries as those of Kirkcaldy district have since been re-used as 'Mid Fife' or 'Central Fife' for some purposes such as local economic planning and policing, although Glenrothes and Kirkcaldy are often split into separate controlling entities owing to their size, with settlements further west around Cowdenbeath incorporated to increase the populations if required, as in the Scottish Parliamentary constituencies.

== Political control ==
The first election to the district council was held in 1974, initially operating as a shadow authority alongside the outgoing authorities until it came into its powers on 16 May 1975. Political control of the council from 1975 was as follows:

Party in control	Years
Labour	1975–1977
No overall control	1977–1980
Labour	1980–1996

== Premises ==
The council was based at Kirkcaldy Town House at 2 Wemyssfield in Kirkcaldy, which had been completed in 1956 for the former Kirkcaldy Town Council.

== See also ==
- 1992 Kirkcaldy District Council election
- Subdivisions of Scotland
