= Hunter Street =

Hunter Street can refer to:

- Hunter Street (Hamilton, Ontario)
- Hunter Street, Newcastle
- Hunter Street, Sydney
- Hunter Street (TV series), Dutch series airing on Nickelodeon
