= Kamptulicon =

Floor covering popular in the 19th century

Kamptulicon, whose name was derived from the Greek kamptos ("flexible") + oulos ("thick"), was a floor covering made from powdered cork and natural rubber.

Patented by Elijah Galloway in 1843, kamptulicon was first launched in public at the 1862 International Exhibition in London, where it caused a sensation. Its promoters compared it to thick, soft leather, and lauded its ease of cleaning, water resistance, warmth, and sound-deadening qualities. Critics, however, pointed out that its grey-brown colour was unattractive. Attempts were made to brighten it up by stencilling patterns on it with oil paint, but these suffered from a lack of durability.

Kamptulicon was manufactured by sprinkling powdered cork on to thin bands of rubber, which was then rolled and rerolled until thoroughly mixed. It was then coated on one or both sides with linseed oil varnish or oil paint. Powdered sulphur was also sometimes mixed in, and the material then heated to produce a form of vulcanized kamptulicon.

As well as a floor covering, kamptulicon was also used as cushions in stamping presses, and as polishing wheels for metals.

Within a few years, faced by stiff competition from the manufacturers of oilcloth coupled with huge increases in the price of natural rubber, kamptulicon production ceased.

== See also ==
- Linoleum
