= Hill Street =

Hill Street may refer to:

- Hill Street, London
- Hill Street (Los Angeles)
- Hill Street, Singapore
- Hill Street Blues, a television series
- Hill Street F.C., an association football club in Northern Ireland
