= Linoleum =

Type of floor covering

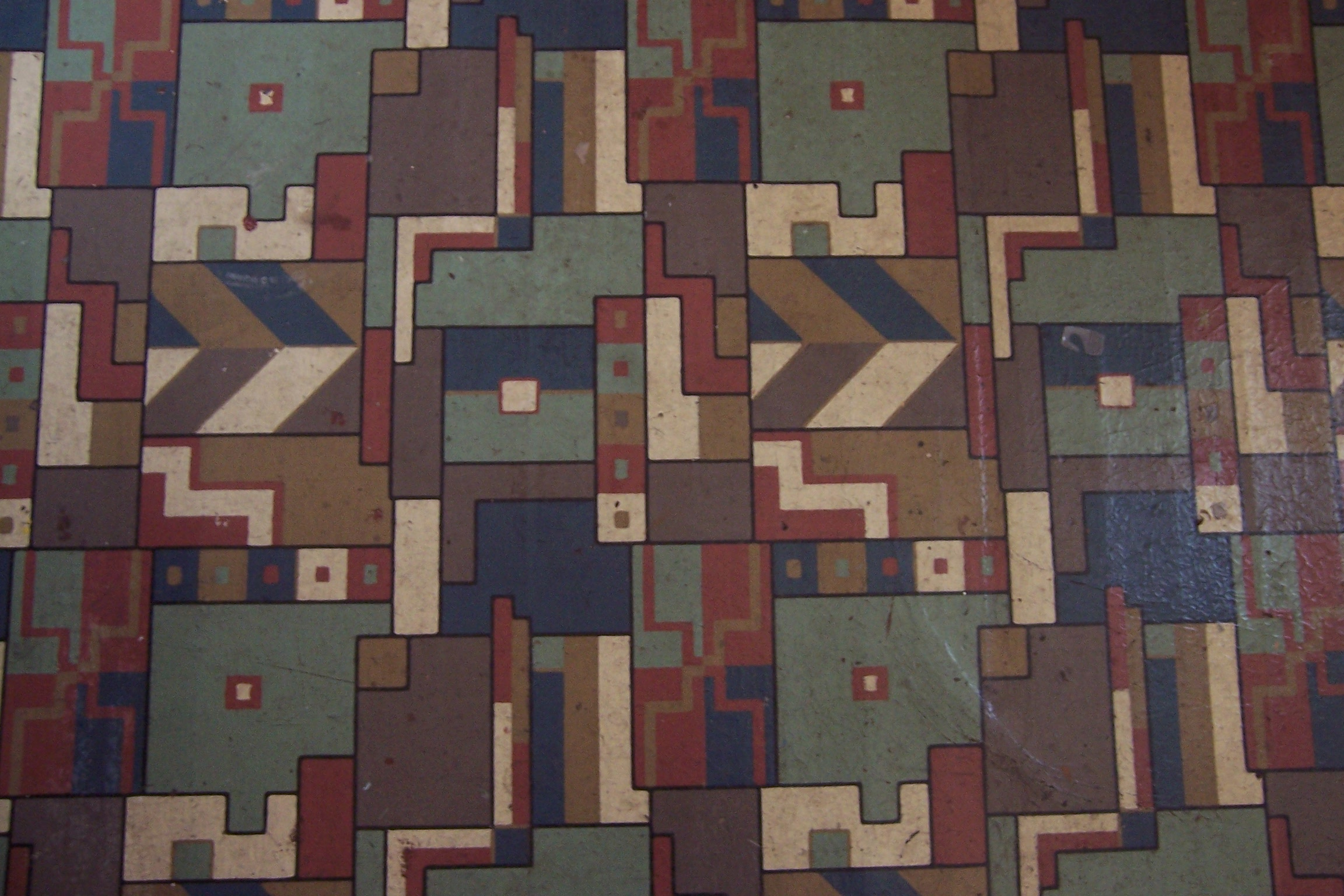
Linoleum from around 1950

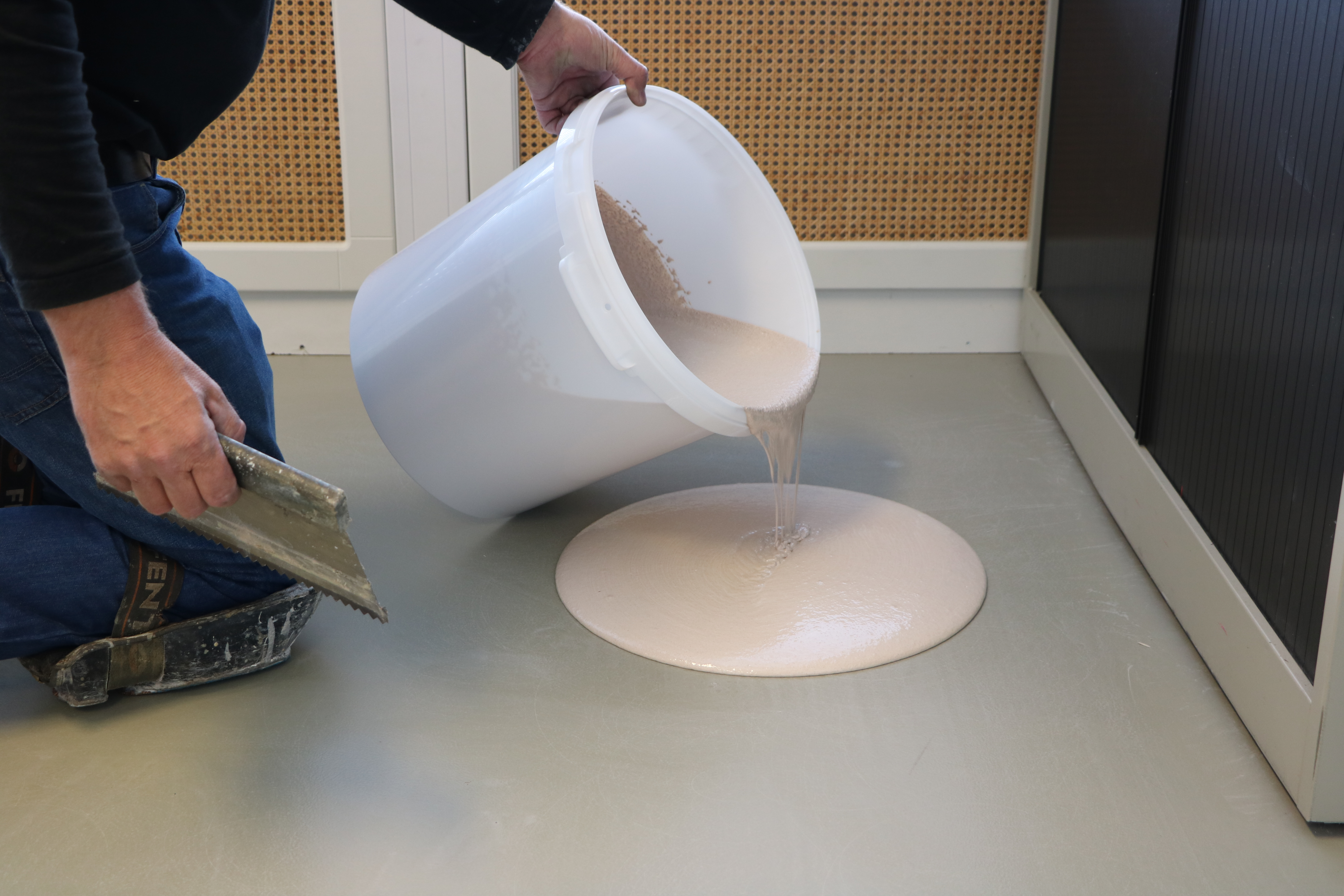
Application of liquid linoleum.

Linoleum is a floor covering made from materials such as solidified linseed oil (linoxyn), pine resin, ground cork dust, sawdust, and mineral fillers such as calcium carbonate, most commonly on a hessian or canvas backing. Colloquially, the term "linoleum" is generically used for synthetic floor coverings of any composition, including polyvinyl chloride (PVC).

It gained popularity as a flooring option in the late 19th century and is still used today. Commercially, the material has been largely replaced by sheet vinyl flooring, a plastic alternative made of PVC, though many still call it linoleum. This is mainly due to the fact that its plastic counterpart is less costly and much faster to produce.

Pigments are mixed directly into the linoleum cement to create the desired color finish. In the past some of these pigments were iron oxide, red lead or lithopone.

The most expensive linoleum floors, known as "inlaid", are extremely durable, and are made by joining and inlaying solid pieces of linoleum. Cheaper patterned linoleum comes in different grades or gauges, and is printed with thinner layers which are more prone to wear and tear. High-quality linoleum is flexible and thus can be used in buildings where a more rigid material (such as ceramic tile) would crack.

== Chemistry ==
Chemical reactions associated with crosslinking of drying oils, the process that produces linoleum.

Representative fat found in a drying oil. The triester is derived from three different unsaturated fatty acids, linoleic (top), alpha-linolenic (middle), and oleic acids (bottom). The order of drying rate is alpha-linolenic > linoleic > oleic acid, reflecting their degree of unsaturation.

Linoleum in essence consists of two components, a polymerized organic compound and a collection of fillers, pigments, and catalysts. The polymerized precursors are rich in polyunsaturated fats, especially derivatives of linoleic acid and alpha-linolenic acid. Such fats are called drying oils because they "dry" (harden) upon exposure to the oxygen in air. The drying process results in cross-linking of the fat molecules. This cross-linking process is often slow, thus catalysts and heat are applied to give a durable material. During this cross-linking, fillers and pigments are mixed with the resin.

== Sustainability ==
Linoleum is a sustainable choice when looking for flooring options in comparison to many other plastic alternatives. It is created from multiple renewable resources that are non toxic and fully biodegradable. It is very durable, and will last at least 20 years if maintained correctly.

This means that linoleum's ecological footprint is very small in comparison to many other material choices on the market. Linoleum is considered an environmentally friendly alternative to PVC as it is derived from renewable, natural, biodegradable material. Many companies that manufacture linoleum sheets have environmental certifications such as some of the leading brands Artoleum and Marmoleum.

Furthermore, off-cuts created during the manufacturing process are fully recyclable and can be ground or cut up and mixed into new batches of the linoleum cement.

One of the main flax sources for the linseed oil used in linoleum's manufacturing is Canada due to its annual crop abundance in the Canadian western prairies.

== History ==
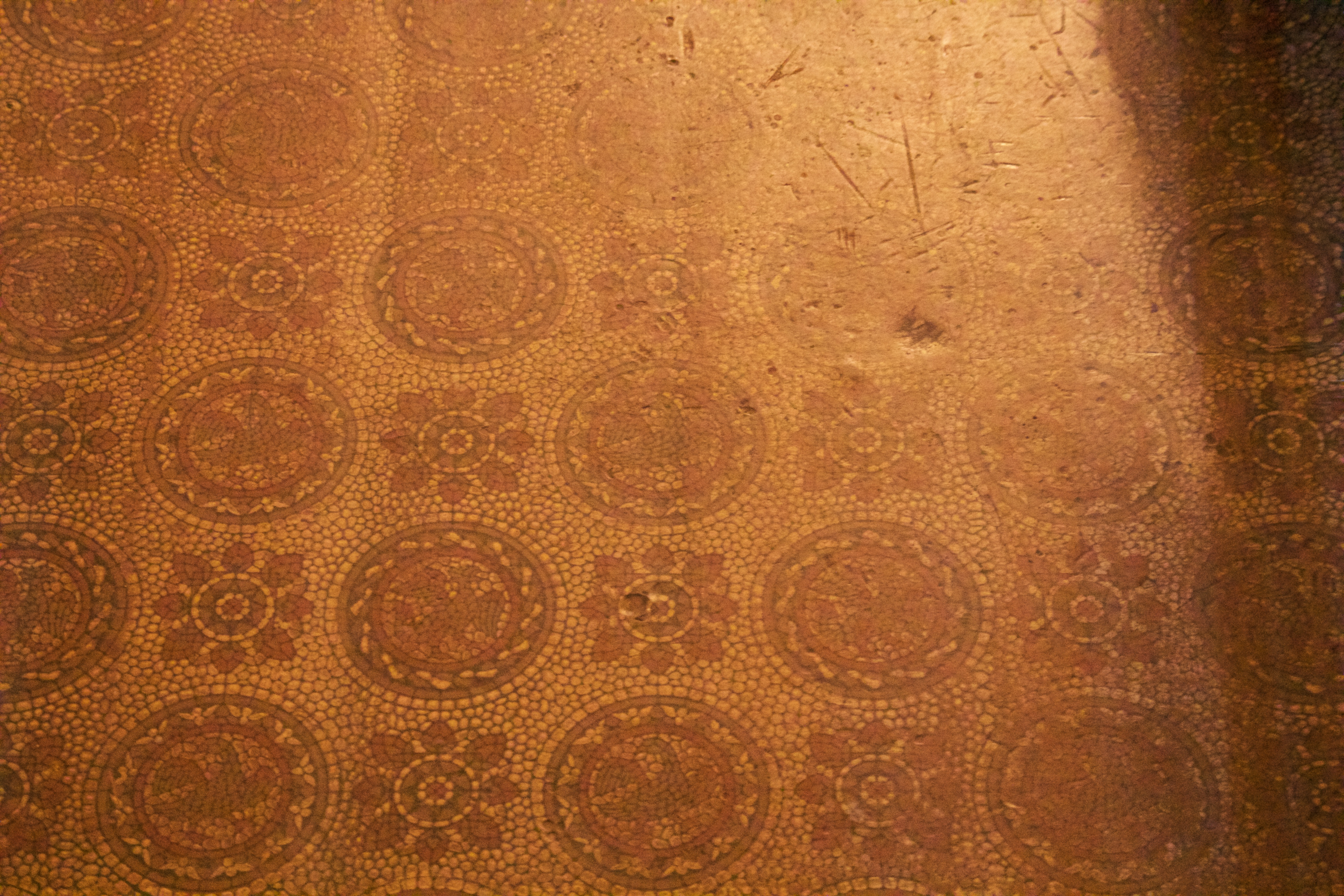
Early linoleum at Tyntesfield

Linoleum was invented by Englishman Frederick Walton. In 1855, Walton happened to notice the rubbery, flexible skin of solidified linseed oil (linoxyn) that had formed on a can of oil-based paint and thought that it might form a substitute for India rubber. Raw linseed oil oxidizes very slowly, but Walton accelerated the process by heating it with lead acetate and zinc sulfate. This made the oil form a resinous mass into which lengths of cheap cotton cloth were dipped until a thick coating formed. The coating was then scraped off and boiled with benzene or similar solvents to form a varnish. Walton initially planned to sell his varnish to the makers of water-repellent fabrics such as oilcloth, and received Patent No. 209 on 27 January 1860 for the process. However, his method had problems: the cotton cloth soon fell apart, and it took months to produce enough of the linoxyn. Little interest was shown in Walton's varnish. In addition, his first factory burned down, and he suffered from persistent and painful rashes.

Walton soon came up with an easier way to transfer the oil to the cotton sheets, by hanging them vertically and sprinkling the oil from above, and he tried mixing the linoxyn with sawdust and cork dust to make it less tacky. In 1863, he applied for a further patent, which read: "For these purposes canvas or other suitable strong fabrics are coated over on their upper surfaces with a composition of oxidized oil, cork dust, and gum or resin ... such surfaces being afterward printed, embossed, or otherwise ornamented. The back or under surfaces of such fabrics are coated with a coating of such oxidized oils, or oxidized oils and gum or resin, and by preference without an admixture of cork."

At first, Walton called his invention "Kampticon", which was deliberately close to Kamptulicon, the name of an existing floor covering, but he soon changed it to Linoleum, which he derived from the Latin words linum (flax) and oleum (oil). In 1864, he established the Linoleum Manufacturing Company Ltd., with a factory at Staines, near London. The new product did not prove immediately popular, mainly due to intense competition from the makers of Kamptulicon and oilcloth. The company operated at a loss for its first five years, until Walton began an intensive advertising campaign and opened two shops in London for the exclusive sale of Linoleum. Walton's friend Jerimiah Clarke designed the linoleum patterns, typically with a Grecian urn motif around the borders.

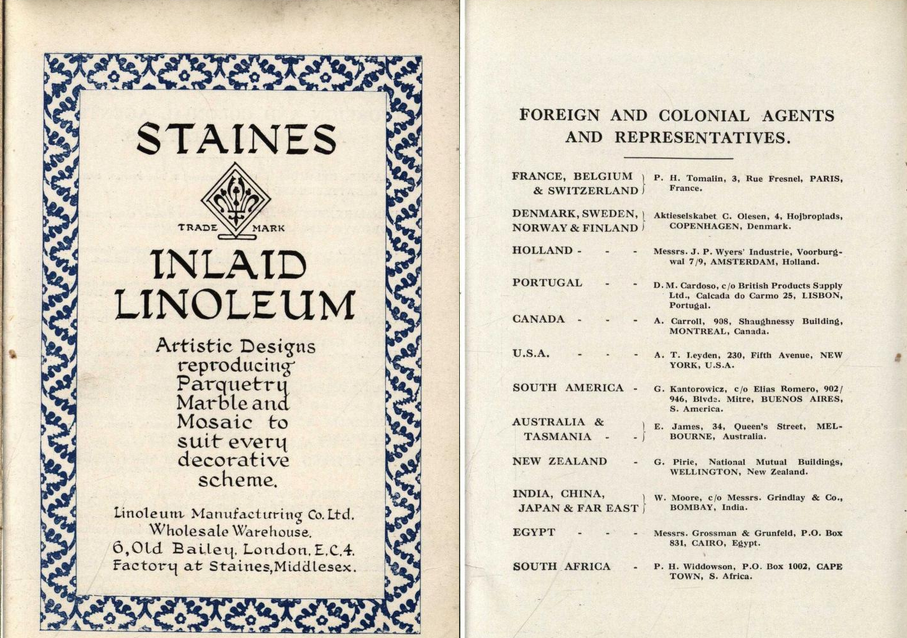
An old linoleum catalog showcasing various patterns and designs

Other inventors began their own experiments after Walton took out his patent, and in 1871, William Parnacott took out a patent for a method of producing linoxyn by blowing hot air into a tank of linseed oil for several hours, then cooling the material in trays. Unlike Walton's process, which took weeks, Parnacott's method took only a day or two, although the quality of the linoxyn was not as good. Despite this, many manufacturers opted to use the less expensive Parnacott process.

Walton soon faced competition from other manufacturers, including a company which bought the rights to Parnacott's process, and launched its own floor covering, which it named Corticine, from the Latin cortex (bark or rind). Corticine was mainly made of cork dust and linoxyn without a cloth backing, and became popular because it was cheaper than linoleum.

By 1869, Walton's factory in Staines, England was exporting to Europe and the United States. In 1877, the Scottish town of Kirkcaldy, in Fife, became the largest producer of linoleum in the world, with no fewer than six floor cloth manufacturers in the town, most notably Michael Nairn & Co., which had been producing floor cloth since 1847.

Walton opened the American Linoleum Manufacturing Company in 1872 on Staten Island, in partnership with Joseph Wild, the company's town being named Linoleumville (renamed Travis in 1930). It was the first U.S. linoleum manufacturer, but was soon followed by the American Nairn Linoleum Company, established by Sir Michael Nairn in 1887 (later the Congoleum-Nairn Company, and then the Congoleum Corporation of America), in Kearny, New Jersey. Congoleum now manufactures sheet vinyl and no longer has a linoleum line

Other products devised by Walton included Linoleum Muralis in 1877, which became better known as Lincrusta. Essentially a highly durable linoleum wall covering, Lincrusta could be manufactured to resemble carved plaster or wood, or even leather. It was very successful, and inspired a much cheaper imitation, Anaglypta, originally devised by one of Walton's showroom managers.

=== Loss of trade mark protection ===
Walton was unhappy with Michael Nairn & Co's use of the name Linoleum and brought a lawsuit against them for trademark infringement. However, the term had not been trademarked, and he lost the suit, the court opining that even if the name had been registered as a trademark, it was by now so widely used that it had become generic, only 14 years after its invention. It is considered to be the first product name to become a generic term.

== Manufacturing ==
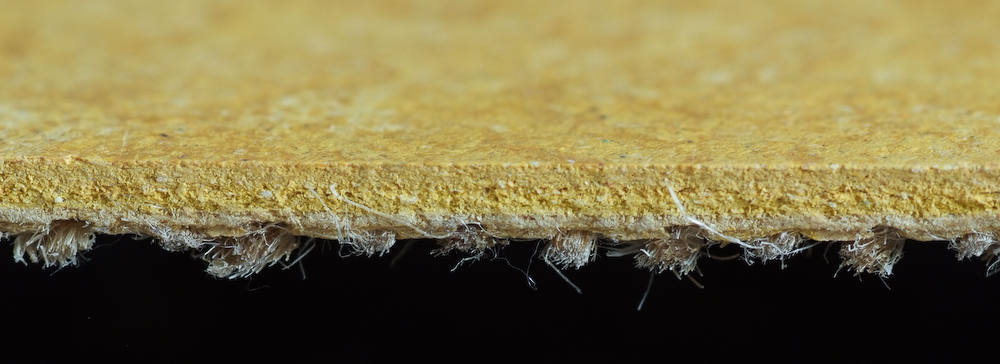
Cross section view show linoleum's pigmentation evenly distributed throughout the slab.

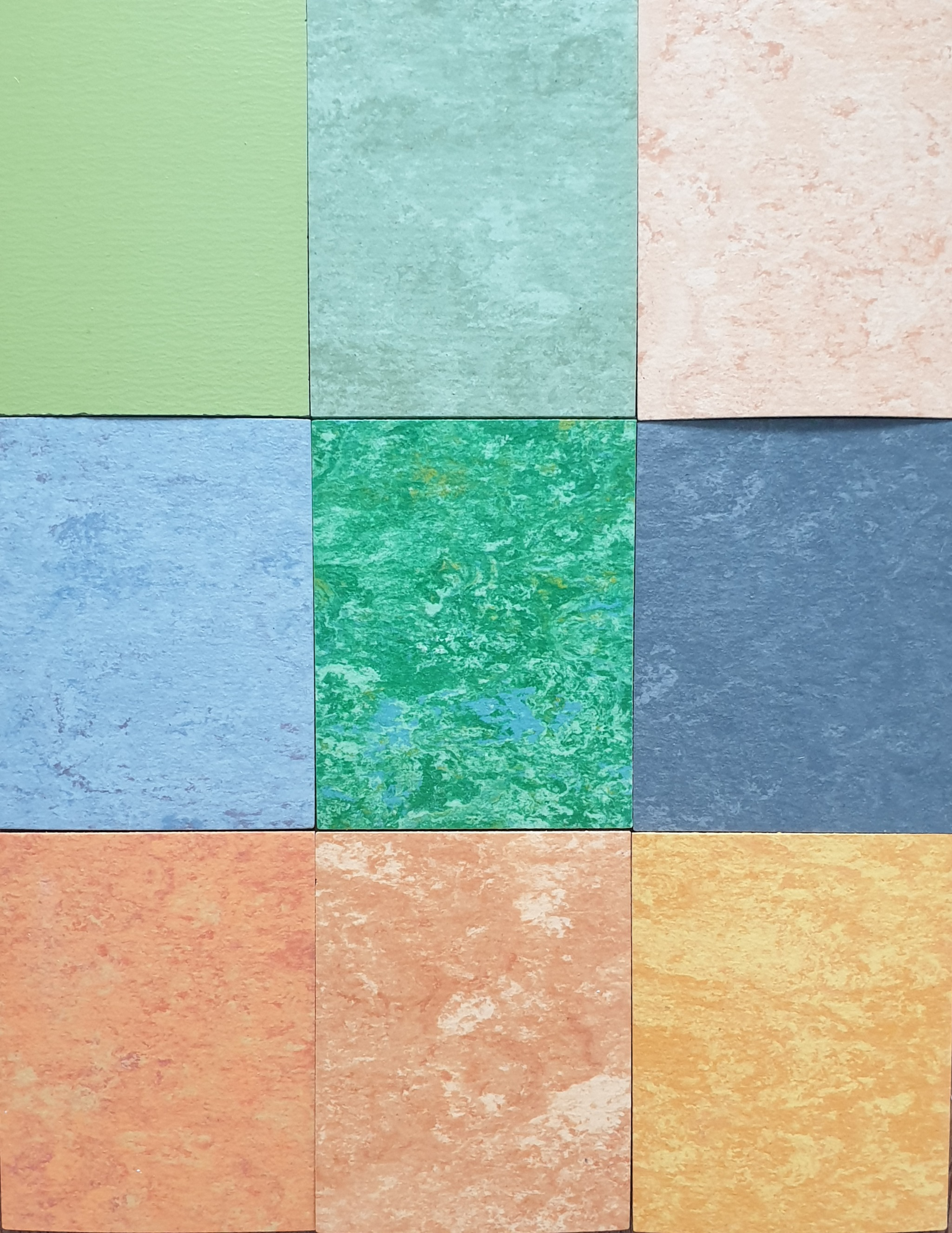
Color samples of linoleum

Walton also tried integrating designs into linoleum during the manufacturing stage, coming up with granite, marbled, and jaspé (striped) linoleum. For the granite variety, granules of various colors of linoleum cement were mixed together, before being hot-rolled. If the granules were not completely mixed before rolling, the result was marbled or jaspé patterns.

Walton's next product was inlaid linoleum, which resembled encaustic tiles, in 1882. Previously, linoleum had been produced in solid colors, with patterns printed on the surface if required. In inlaid linoleum, the colors extend all the way through to the backing cloth. Inlaid linoleum was made using a stencil type method where different-colored granules were placed in shaped metal trays, after which the sheets were run through heated rollers to fuse them to the backing cloth. In 1898, Walton devised a process for making straight-line inlaid linoleum that allowed for crisp, sharp geometric designs. This involved strips of uncured linoleum being cut and pieced together patchwork-fashion before being hot-rolled. Embossed inlaid linoleum was not introduced until 1926.

In its earlier days most linoleum was produced by hand with basic equipment but by the 1880s new manufacturing machinery was introduced that streamlined the process. These new machines were the flat-bed printing machine and rotary device. This process has evolved since and some of the longer parts of the process that once took weeks to complete, can be produced from start to finish in about seven days. In its entirety the manufacturing of linoleum is still a lengthy one due to its long curing times in order for the linoleum cement to properly adhere to its backing.

== Use ==
Between the time of its invention in 1860 and its being largely superseded by other hard floor coverings in the 1950s, linoleum was considered to be an inexpensive material for high-use areas. In the late nineteenth and early twentieth centuries, it was favored in hallways and passages, and as a surround for carpet squares. However, most people associate linoleum with its common twentieth century use on kitchen floors. Its water resistance enabled easy maintenance of sanitary conditions. Furthermore, the oxidization process of linseed used in the fabrication of Linoleum creates a Lynoxin binder which is naturally bactericidal. This creates a natural defense against harmful germs which is why Linoleum flooring is a popular choice in high bacterial areas such as schools, hospitals, kitchens and day cares.

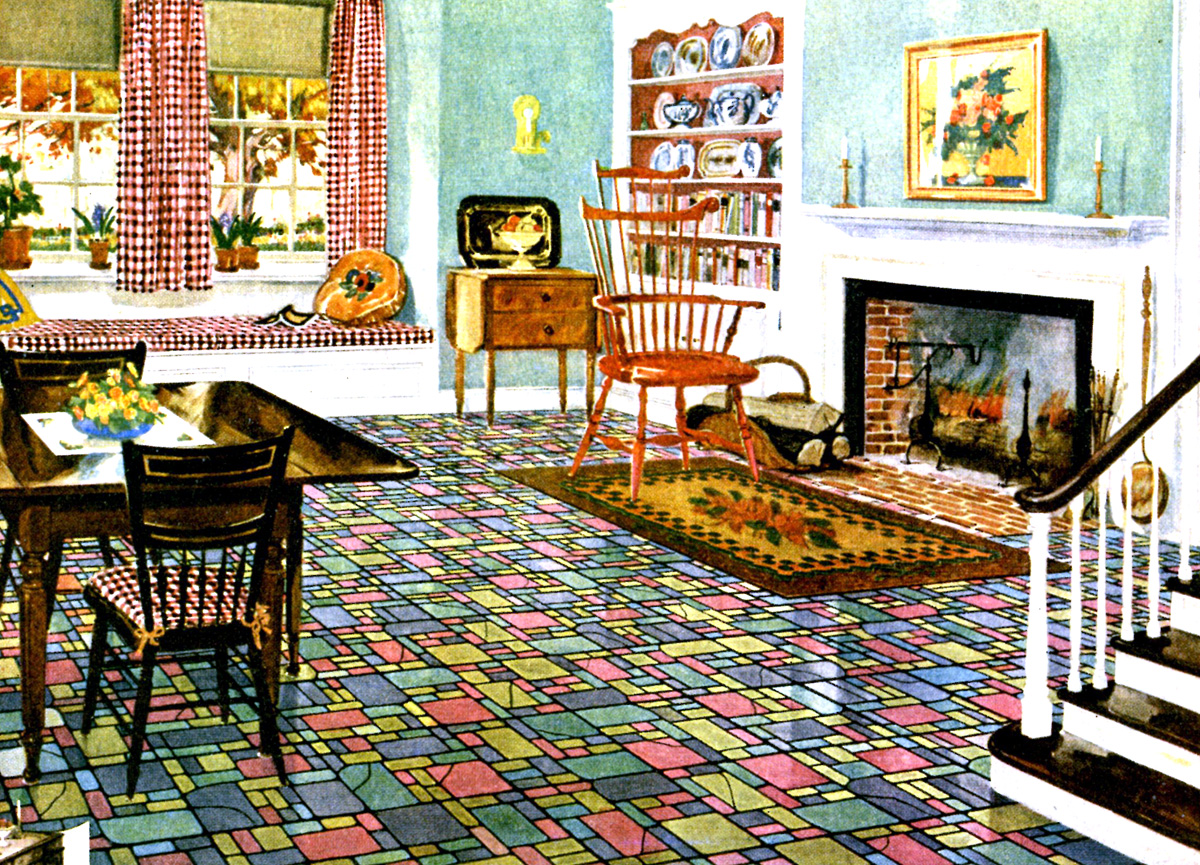
1928 advertisement for Armstrong Linoleum

The heavier gauges of linoleum are known as "battleship linoleum", and are mainly used in high-traffic situations like offices and public buildings. It was originally manufactured to meet the specifications of the U.S. Navy for warship deck covering on enclosed decks instead of wood, hence the name. Most U.S. Navy warships removed their linoleum deck coverings following the attack on Pearl Harbor, as they were considered too flammable. Use of linoleum persisted in U.S. Navy submarines. Royal Navy warships used the similar product "Corticine".

=== Printmaking ===
Early in the twentieth century, a group of Dresden artists used easy-to-cut linoleum instead of wood for printmaking, creating the linocut printmaking technique – similar to woodcuts. Prominent artists who created linocut prints included Picasso and Henri Matisse. 21st-century linocut artists include Angela Harding.

Linoleum sheets were easier to carve and work with than the traditional method of wood block printing. Typically the blocks of linoleum can come mounted or unmounted to a backing such as canvas or MDF. The unmounted sheets are pliable and flexible and may be more difficult to work with for bigger prints.

=== Jewelry ===
Amashaza are a form of iziqhaza ear plugs in Zulu art that use pieces of cut linoleum tile to create symmetrical geometric designs on the plug face.
