= 2024 in Scotland =

- Centuries: 19th; 20th; 21st
- Decades: 2000s; 2010s; 2020s
- See also: List of years in Scotland; Timeline of Scottish history 2024 in: The UK • England • Wales • Elsewhere; Scottish football: 2023–24 • 2024–25; 2024 in Scottish television

Events from the year 2024 in Scotland.

== Incumbents ==
- First Minister
  - Humza Yousaf (until 7 May 2024)
  - John Swinney (starting 8 May 2024)
- Secretary of State:
  - Alister Jack (until 5 July 2024)
  - Ian Murray (starting on 5 July 2024)

== Events ==
=== January ===
- 1 January – Police Scotland launch a murder investigation following the death of a 38-year-old man who was shot outside an Edinburgh pub shortly before midnight on New Year's Eve. A second man injured during the incident has been taken to hospital. The deceased man is subsequently named as Marc Webley.
- 3 January – Police say they are "extremely concerned" for the safety of Laura Wilkie, a 43-year-old woman from Ayr, who has been missing since 18 December 2023.
- 4 January –
  - Owners of American XL bully dogs in England and Wales are warned not to rehome them in Scotland as they become a banned breed under the Dangerous Dogs Act 1991 in England and Wales.
  - Police searching for Laura Wilkie find a body at Rozelle Park in Ayr, close to where she was last seen.
- 5 January – Fugitive Nicholas Rossi, wanted in the United States on rape charges, is extradited from Scotland.
- 6 January – A 32-year-old man and 25-year-old woman have been arrested and charged with murder over the death of Marc Webley on New Year's Eve, police have confirmed.
- 8 January – Scottish Government papers reveal that a fragment of the Stone of Destiny gifted to Alex Salmond in 2008, and thought to be lost, is being held by the Scottish National Party at its headquarters.
- 9 January – BBC News reports that a ban on American XL bully dogs is likely in Scotland by the end of January.
- 10 January –
  - First Minister Humza Yousaf confirms those in Scotland convicted because of the Post Office scandal will be cleared following a similar announcement at Westminster for England and Wales, and that he will work with the UK government to bring this about.
  - It is reported that David Page, the deputy chief officer at Police Scotland and the force's most senior member of civilian staff, has made a complaint against new Chief Constable Jo Farrell, doing so within weeks of her arrival.
- 11 January –
  - First Minister Humza Yousaf confirms that the Scottish Government will "in essence replicate" the law in England and Wales banning unlicensed ownership of American XL bully dogs.
  - Plans are announced for West Town, a £2bn 7,000 home development on land near Edinburgh Airport.
- 13 January – A 70-year-old woman is charged after a car ran into protesters at a pro-Palestine march in Edinburgh.
- 14 January – Ramsay El-Nakla, the brother-in-law of Humza Yousaf, has been charged by police in connection with drugs offences.
- 15 January –
  - Robert O'Brien and Andrew Kelly are sentenced to life imprisonment with minimum terms of 22 and 18 years respectively for the 1996 murder of Caroline Glachan.
  - James Stockan announces he will step down from the post of leader of Orkney Islands Council, as well as relinquishing his council seat, after six years in the role.
- 16 January –
  - A yellow weather warning is in place for snow and ice for the whole of Scotland.
  - Lord Advocate Dorothy Bain, Scotland's most senior lawyer, apologises to victims of the Post Office scandal, saying they were let down by the justice system.
  - Finance Secretary Shona Robison confirms that the Scottish Government is to cut at least 1,200 funded university places as they cannot afford to continue paying for additional places created during the COVID-19 pandemic.
- 17 January – The UK government is seeking legal expenses from the Scottish Government over its challenge against the veto of the Gender Recognition Reform (Scotland) Bill.
- 18 January –
  - Community Safety Minister Siobhian Brown announces that Scotland will introduce legislation to ban the sale, breeding and abandonment of American XL bully dogs, replicating the law for England and Wales, at a date to be confirmed later.
  - Nuns Sister Sarah McDermott and Sister Eileen Igoe, and carer Margaret Hughes, who mistreated children at Smyllum Park, an orphanage in Lanark from 1969 until 1981 when it closed, are each sentenced to three years in prison.
  - Helen Goss, the mother of an eleven-year-old girl from Aberdeenshire with long COVID, launches legal action against NHS Grampian for what she says are the health board's "multiple failings" in the care and treatment of her daughter.
- 21 January –
  - Scotland's First Minister, Humza Yousaf, tells the BBC's Sunday with Laura Kuenssberg he is willing to work with Sir Keir Starmer if he becomes prime minister after the next general election.
  - ScotRail cancels all services from 7pm until after the following day's rush hour because of high winds caused by Storm Isha.
- 22 January – ScotRail announces another suspension of train services from 7pm the following day ahead of the arrival of Storm Jocelyn.
- 23 January – The Rail Accident Investigation Branch launches an investigation into a collision between a train and a fallen tree at 84 mph (135 kmh) at Broughty Ferry on the Dundee–Aberdeen line during Storm Gerrit in December 2023.
- 26 January – French Holocaust denier Vincent Reynouard, who spent two years on the run in Scotland before being apprehended by police in November 2022, loses his appeal against extradition to France, where he faces charges of inciting hatred and denying the occurrence of the Holocaust.
- 28 January – The Met Office records a provisional peak temperature of 19.6 °C (67.3 °F) at Kinlochewe in the Scottish Highlands, setting a new record for January temperatures in the area.
- 29 January –
  - Edinburgh City Council implements a ban on pavement parking.
  - Engineers begin four days of work to install netting above the railway at Ratho to prevent potential rockfall, causing disruption to Central Belt railway services while the work is carried out.
  - Robert O'Brian and Andrew Kelly are to appeal against their sentences for the murder of Caroline Glachan.
- 31 January – The Scottish Government confirms it will introduce a ban on the sale and exchange of American XL bully dogs from 23 February, while a licence to own one will be required from 31 July.

=== February ===
- 1 February –
  - Scottish Water confirms that water bills will increase by 8.8% from April.
  - Honshu, a seven-year-old male Japanese macaque who escaped from the Highland Wildlife Park at Kincraig, is recaptured after five days on the run.
- 3 February –
  - A bus driver, subsequently named as Keith Rollinson, dies in hospital at Elgin following an assault at a bus station in the town the previous evening. A 15-year-old boy is subsequently arrested and charged with murder.
  - Transport Scotland has put forward proposals for road tunnels linking parts of the Western Isles, and linking Mull to the mainland.
- 4 February –
  - The Scottish Information Commissioner, which oversees Scotland's freedom of information laws, launches a probe into the Scottish Government's use of informal messaging such as WhatsApp after "significant practice concerns" were raised by the UK COVID-19 Inquiry.
  - The Met Office issues a yellow warning for floods for western and northern Scotland as the country experiences heavy rainfall.
- 6 February – Elena Whitham resigns from the post of Minister for Drugs and Alcohol Policy for health reasons.
- 8 February –
  - Michael Matheson resigns as Scotland's Health Secretary ahead of the publication of a report into £11,000 of data roaming charges accrued by his Parliamentary iPad. He is replaced by Neil Gray.
  - The Scottish Government announces a rise in the minimum unit price for alcohol from 50p to 65p from April, subject to parliamentary approval.
  - Edinburgh City Council says that 200 people have been fined since it introduced a ban on pavement parking on 29 January.
- 9 February – Donald Cameron, a Conservative list MSP for the Highlands and Islands, announces he is standing down from the Scottish Parliament to take up a seat in the House of Lords and a junior ministerial post in the Scottish Office.
- 10 February – Police Scotland are investigating 22 deaths that occurred at the Fullarton Care Home in Irvine, North Ayrshire during the COVID-19 pandemic. The home was one of the worst affected during the early days of the pandemic.
- 11 February – Canadian woman Claire Leveque, aged 24, dies following a disturbance in Sandness, Shetland. Aren Pearson is subsequently charged with her murder.
- 12 February –
  - Actor and writer Simon Fanshawe is named the new Rector of the University of Edinburgh, succeeding Debora Kayembe.
  - A man is arrested and charged over several acts of vandalism in Glasgow, including graffiti relating to the Gaza conflict daubed on the city's cenotaph.
- 13 February – Former NHS worker Tracy Menhinick, who gave a young boy "industrial amounts" of the laxative lactulose, is found guilty of poisoning the child following a 19-day trial at the High Court in Aberdeen.
- 14 February – Jordan Mitchell, who spoke about his desire to commit mass murder in Falkirk during a hospital visit, and who said he had killed animals, is given an Order for Lifelong Restriction by the Court of Criminal Appeal.
- 15 February – Glasgow City Council and North Lanarkshire Council vote to freeze council tax for the 2024–25 financial year.
- 16 February –
  - Former footballer Ciaran Dickson is sentenced to six years in prison by the High Court in Glasgow for the hit-and-run killing of Aidan Pilkington in September 2021, when he was more than three times over the drink drive limit.
  - Scotland is to scrap its Super 6 rugby series and reinstate a national "A team" as part of a comprehensive restructuring programme.
- 17 February –
  - Delegates at the Scottish Labour Party conference pass a resolution calling for an immediate ceasefire in Gaza.
  - Two men are killed in a road traffic accident involving three cars on the B9077 in Maryculter, Aberdeenshire.
- 20 February –
  - Heather Woodbridge, aged 29, is appointed as leader of Orkney Islands Council, becoming Scotland's youngest council leader and the first woman to lead Orkney Islands Council.
  - The BBC announces plans to reshape the BBC Scotland TV channel, including axing the hour-long news programme The Nine and replacing it with a 30-minute programme.
- 22 February – Argyll and Bute Council votes to raise its council tax by 10%, and rejects the Scottish Government's council tax freeze by doing so.
- 23 February – The Scottish Government publishes draft legislation proposing a ban on the sale of disposable vapes in Scotland by 1 April 2025.
- 24 February – Police Scotland begins an investigation after burnt human remains are found near Motherwell Football Club.
- 25 February – The Scottish Government confirms that Economy Secretary Màiri McAllan, who is pregnant, will take maternity leave during the summer, becoming the second Scottish Government minister to do so.
- 26 February –
  - Police say there are no suspicious circumstances surrounding the death of a man whose burnt body was found on a football pitch.
  - First Minister Humza Yousaf describes council tax rises in Scotland as "unjustifiable".
- 27 February –
  - MSPs vote 68–55 in favour of the 2024 Scottish budget, which includes a council tax freeze and 45% and 48% income tax rates for higher earners.
  - Fergus Ewing loses his appeal against a week-long suspension from the SNP group at Holyrood in September 2023 after he criticised the party leadership.
- 28 February – Following a trial at the High Court in Glasgow, Iain Packer is found guilty of the April 2005 murder of Emma Caldwell, a sex worker whose body was found in woods five weeks after she disappeared from Glasgow. Packer, who is also convicted of 32 other offences against women, including rapes and sexual assaults, is sentenced to at least 36 years in prison, the second longest prison sentence to be handed out by a Scottish court.
- 29 February –
  - Aberdeen City Council is rehoming tenants in around 500 properties following the discovery of reinforced autoclaved aerated concrete.
  - Inverclyde Council announces an 8.2% raise in council tax, becoming the second local authority to go against the Scottish Government's wish for a council tax freeze.

=== March ===
- 1 March – First Minister Humza Yousaf announces that his wife, Nadia El-Nakla, is expecting a baby in July, making him the first Scottish First Minister to become a parent while in office.
- 7 March –
  - The Scottish Government announces an independent public inquiry into the police handling of the Emma Caldwell murder investigation.
  - Police Scotland announces it will no longer investigate every low level crime following the success of a pilot project.
- 8 March – The creators of Wirdle, a Shetland dialect version of the Wordle game, announce the game's withdrawal following legal threats from The New York Times, owners of the original game.
- 9 March – A Daily Telegraph report alleging a conflict-of-interest involving First Minister Humza Yousaf after the Scottish Government donated £250,000 to the UN agency UNRWA, which supports Palestinian refugees, is rejected by Yousaf as an "outrageous smear" and a "far right conspiracy".
- 10 March –
  - The Duke of Edinburgh is awarded the Order of the Thistle by Charles III, Scotland's highest royal honour.
  - Creative Scotland launches an investigation into a decision to provide nearly £85,000 of public money for an arts project involving "hardcore" sex performances.
- 11 March – The driver of a double decker bus is arrested after the vehicle's roof is ripped off after crashing into a railway bridge in West Lothian. No passengers were aboard the bus at the time.
- 12 March – Professor Jason Leitch announces he will leave his role as National Clinical Director at the end of April.
- 13 March – Five people are taken to hospital for treatment after a bus crashes into a high rise block of flats in Paisley, Glasgow.
- 14 March –
  - The Scottish Parliament Corporate Body finds Michael Matheson in breach of the Ministerial Code over his £11,000 iPad bill.
  - Mountaineer Anna Wells becomes the first woman to reach the top of all of Scotland's 282 Munros in one winter season.
- 15 March – Following trial and conviction at the High Court in Glasgow, double murderer Peter Duffy is sentenced to at least 30 years in prison for the murder of his wife, Emma Baillie, and brother, John-Paul Duffy, in separate incidents in Coatbridge in 2022.
- 17 March – HMP Kilmarnock becomes the first privately run prison in Scotland to pass into the ownership of the Scottish Prison Service after its contract with Serco comes to an end.
- 19 March – Scottish Prison Service director Allister Purdie gives evidence to the Scottish COVID-19 Inquiry, and apologises to the family of Callum Inglis, who died at Addiewell Prison during the pandemic, after his family learned of the death through word of mouth before they were told formally by prison authorities.
- 21 March –
  - The Scottish Parliamentary Corporate Body confirms that members of Scottish Parliament staff will no longer be allowed to wear rainbow lanyards, or any other badge or jewellery associated with social issues, while at Holyrood.
  - The Wildlife Management and Muirburn (Scotland) Bill passes its final vote in the Scottish Parliament. Among measures it introduces is a licensing scheme for land where grouse shooting takes place, and regulations for traps.
- 22 March –
  - A report prepared by Stirling University calls for artificial 3G football pitches to be banned in Scotland because they contain potentially cancer causing chemicals.
  - Jasmin Paris from Midlothian becomes the first woman to complete the Barkley Marathons in the US state of Tennessee, doing so with one minute 39 seconds to spare of the 60-hour cut off.
- 27 March –
  - Following a three-week hearing at Edinburgh Sheriff Court, former private school teacher John Brownlee, who worked at the Edinburgh Academy between 1967 and 1987, is found to have physically abused bos in his charge. He will not face trial though as he was earlier deemed to be medically unfit to do so.
  - A group calling itself INC Ransom threatens to publish data stolen from NHS Dumfries and Galloway.
  - VisitScotland announces that its 25 information centres will close over the next two years.
- 28 March – The Assisted Dying for Terminally Ill Adults (Scotland) Bill, a bill to legalise assisted dying in Scotland and drafted by Liberal Democrat MSP Liam McArthur, is introduced into the Scottish Parliament.

=== April ===
- 1 April – The Hate Crime and Public Order (Scotland) Act 2021, which creates a new crime of "stirring up hatred" relating to age, disability, religion, sexual orientation, transgender identity or being intersex, comes into force in Scotland.
- 2 April –
  - The Scottish Government publishes a consultation on legislation to ban egg producers from housing chickens in cages in Scotland.
  - Police Scotland says that comments challenging Scotland's new hate crime law made by the author J K Rowling are not being treated as a crime.
- 6 April – Changes to Income tax in Scotland come into force, with a new "Advanced" rate for those earning over £75,000.
- 8 April –
  - Ritlecitinib, provided under the brand name Litfulo and used to treat the most common forms of alopecia, is licensed for use by the NHS in Scotland.
  - Father and son Ian and Dean McLeod are sentenced to life imprisonment with minimum terms of 34 years for the 2022 murders of Derek Johnston and Desmond Rowlings with the use of a blowtorch at a flat in Edinburgh.
- 9 April – Former NHS worker Tracy Menhinick is sentenced to seven years in prison after poisoning a young boy with "industrial" amounts of laxative.
- 10 April – Police Scotland says it received 7,000 online reports of alleged hate crimes during the first week of new laws enacted by the Hate Crime and Public Order (Scotland) Act.
- 11 April – Glasgow is named as a potential host of the 2026 Commonwealth Games following Victoria's July 2023 decision to withdraw as host because of rising costs.
- 14 April – First Minister Humza Yousaf condemns Iran's attack against Israel, describing it as an "extremely worrying development.
- 15 April – Police Scotland make their first two arrests for alleged offences breaching the Hunting with Dogs (Scotland) Act 2023.
- 17 April – MSPs vote to increase the minimum alcohol price by 30% from September, when alcoholic drinks will rise from 50p to 65p per unit, with the increase in line with inflation.
- 18 April –
  - Peter Murrell, the former chief executive of the Scottish National Party (SNP) and husband of Nicola Sturgeon, is re-arrested by Police Scotland and charged in connection with the embezzlement of funds from the SNP. Murrell also resigns his membership of the SNP.
  - The Scottish Government scraps its target of achieving Net Zero by 2030, as well as annual and interim targets for reducing greenhouse gases, and instead replaces them with a system measuring emissions every five years.
  - Following a review of gender services in England, NHS Scotland pauses the use of puberty blockers for children in Scotland, while Glasgow's Sandyford Clinic says 16- and 17-year-olds will need to wait until they are 18 to be prescribed the drugs.
- 19 April –
  - At the High Court in Glasgow, Kristofer Johnstone is sentenced to ten years in prison after being convicted of the rape and abuse of two girls between 2003 and 2018.
  - The Scottish Greens announce their intention to hold a vote on whether to stay in government with the Scottish National Party following the SNP's decision to scrap key climate targets.
- 20 April – BBC News reports that the SNP will form a minority government if the Scottish Greens vote to end their power-sharing agreement.
- 21 April – A 20-year-old man is charged after a car appeared to drive at pro-independence marchers in Glasgow the previous day.
- 22 April –
  - Donna Marie Brand, one of three people convicted of the 1996 murder of Caroline Glachan, is sentenced to life imprisonment with a minimum of 17 years.
  - John-Paul McLaughlan is sentenced to life imprisonment with a minimum of 17 years after admitting the murder of his partner, Stacey Warnock, who was stabbed multiple times following an argument at the couple's home in December 2022.
  - NHS Dumfries and Galloway apologises for any anxiety caused by a cyberattack, described as a "targeted and continued incursion", which occurred in March.
- 23 April –
  - Two people are taken to hospital after a light aircraft crashes at Monkton near Prestwick Airport.
  - 2024 Scottish government crisis: Patrick Harvie says he will resign as co-leader of the Scottish Greens if the party votes to end its coalition agreement with the SNP.
- 25 April – 2024 Scottish government crisis: The Scottish National Party's coalition in the Scottish government with the Scottish Greens collapses as the SNP withdraws. The SNP announce their intention to continue as a minority government. The Scottish Conservatives call a no confidence vote in First Minister Humza Yousaf.
- 26 April – 2024 Scottish government crisis: Humza Yousaf says he will not resign as first minister of Scotland despite facing a motion of no confidence in his government.
- 28 April – 2024 Scottish government crisis: BBC News reports that Yousaf has ruled out an electoral pact between the SNP and Alba Party after Alex Salmond suggested the party would support him in a vote of no confidence in the Scottish Parliament.
- 29 April – 2024 Scottish government crisis: Yousaf announces his resignation as both leader of the SNP and first minister of Scotland when his successor is chosen.
- 30 April – Officials at Holyrood confirm that Labour's motion of no confidence in the Scottish Government will be voted on by MSPs the next day.

=== May ===
- 1 May – MSPs vote 70–58 to defeat a motion of no confidence in the Scottish Government.
- 2 May – John Swinney is set to become the next SNP leader and first minister after Kate Forbes confirms she will not seek the party's leadership.
- 5 May – John Swinney warns that any bid to challenge his election as leader would delay rebuilding the party amid reports party activist Graeme McCormick is set to put his name forward. He subsequently announces he will not launch a challenge and endorses Swinney.
- 6 May – John Swinney is confirmed as Leader of the Scottish National Party after being unopposed in the leadership election, and begins his second tenure in the post.
- 7 May – John Swinney wins the backing of the Scottish Parliament to become Scotland's seventh First Minister, and will be sworn into office the next day.
- 8 May –
  - John Swinney is sworn in as Scotland's seventh first minister at a ceremony at the Court of Session in Edinburgh.
  - Swinney appoints Kate Forbes as Scotland's Deputy First Minister.
  - Plans to redevelop Glasgow's Met Tower as a digital technology hub are cancelled, with the company behind the redevelopment citing "significant changes" to economic conditions and the construction market.
- 9 May – Swinney confirms to the BBC that the SNP's strategy of using the next general election as a mandate for a second referendum on Scottish independence remains.
- 10 May –
  - Food Standards Scotland confirms a case of BSE has been found on a farm in Ayrshire, but says there is no risk to the public as the animal did not enter the food chain.
  - The Scottish Government reaffirms its wish to see the Gender Recognition Reform (Scotland) Bill enacted.
- 11 May – Scotland's warmest day of the year so far is recorded by the Met Office, with a temperature of 25.7 °C at Cassley.
- 13 May – At the High Court in Kilmarnock, Uber driver Kunathilinghan Mohanthas is sentenced to seven years in prison for killing Christopher Hanton, who he left for dead in Glasgow city centre after ordering him out of his car and knocking him over as he performed a three-point turn in August 2023.
- 14 May – MSPs unanimously approve the Housing Cladding Remediation Bill with 116 votes in favour of the legislation that seeks to address problems with cladding on buildings and avoid a similar incident to the Grenfell Tower fire in Scotland.
- 15 May –
  - The Scottish Government declares a national housing emergency during a parliamentary debate at Holyrood, citing UK government budget cuts and austerity as the reasons for a shortage in housing.
  - Justice Secretary Angela Constance confirms that the Scottish Government are to seek powers to facilitate the early release of prisoners in order to prevent overcrowding in prisons. The rules would only apply to those serving under four years and would not apply to those convicted of sexual or domestic violence related offences.
- 18 May – Four police officers are injured and 19 arrests made in Glasgow city centre as fans celebrate after Celtic win the Premiership.
- 21 May –
  - Scottish culture secretary Angus Robertson calls for an urgent meeting with Creative Scotland after an arts project involving real sex was given over £100,000 in government funding.
  - Aberdeen sheriff Jack Brown is to be removed from office over sexual harassment allegations after a tribunal finds he has committed "serious improper conduct" towards two women.
- 23 May –
  - Police Scotland announces that it has submitted a "standard prosecution report" concerning its investigation into SNP finances to the Crown Office and Procurator Fiscal Service.
  - First Minister John Swinney announces he will not accept a parliamentary committee ruling to exclude Michael Matheson from Holyrood for 27 days over his £11,000 iPad charges bill, claiming the decision is "prejudiced" due to the involvement of a Conservative MSP who previously made comments about Matheson.
- 25 May –
  - The Faculty of Advocates finds Andrew Smith KC guilty of serious misconduct over "serious and reprehensible" actions relating to a legal case involving a dating app business in which he had a "close personal involvement".
  - Celtic defeat Rangers 1–0 to win the 2024 Scottish Cup final.
- 29 May –
  - MSPs vote 64–0 to exclude former Health Secretary Michael Matheson from the Scottish Parliament for 27 sitting days, and to suspend his salary for 54 days, after he breached expenses rules by accululating an £11,000 bill on his parliamentary iPad. The governing SNP abstains from voting, and calls for a review of the complaints procedure, suggesting it could be open to bias.
  - Dundee becomes the second city in Scotland to introduce a low emission zone.
- 30 May – Police searching for a father and son missing after hillwalking in Glen Coe confirm they have found two bodies.
- 31 May – Scotland's UEFA Women's Euro 2025 qualifier match against Israel is delayed after a protestor padlocks himself to the goalposts at Hampden Park. A 24-year-old man is subsequently charged over the incident.

=== June ===
- 1 June – Aberdeen and Edinburgh become the latest Scottish cities to introduce low emission zones.
- 2 June – A memorial service is held at Southend Parish Church to mark the 30th anniversary of the 1994 RAF Chinook disaster in which 29 passengers and crew were killed.
- 3 June – The first 2024 general election leaders debate takes place in Scotland, with the leaders of Scotland's four main political parties taking part in a debate on STV.
- 5 June – Alba Party leader Alex Salmond confirms he will not stand in the general election, but instead plans to stand in the 2026 Scottish Parliament election in Banff and Buchan.
- 7 June – At the High Court in Edinburgh, council worker Michael Paterson admits to embezzling more than £1m from Aberdeen City Council while employed as a council tax and recovery team leader between 2006 and 2023.
- 9 June – The Sunday Mail reports allegations that Scottish Conservative leader Douglas Ross used Westminster expenses to travel in his role as a football linesman.
- 10 June – Douglas Ross announces his resignation as leader of the Scottish Conservatives, triggering a leadership election. Ross says he will also resign from Holyrood if he is re-elected to Westminster.
- 11 June –
  - BBC Scotland airs an election debate featuring the leaders of Scotland's five main political parties: John Swinney (SNP), Douglas Ross (Scottish Conservatives), Anas Sarwar (Scottish Labour), Alex Cole-Hamilton (Scottish Liberal Democrats) and Lorna Slater (Scottish Greens).
  - Robin Harper, a former leader of the Scottish Greens, joins Scottish Labour, citing his former party's failure on the environment for his decision.
- 12 June –
  - MSPs vote for the early release of 500 prisoners in order to ease overcrowding in the Scottish Prison Service.
  - Edinburgh City Council approves plans by AEG to build an 8,500 capacity stadium at Edinburgh Park.
- 13 June – Stagecoach Group announces plaans to cut services in north Scotland as it launches a review of its operations.
- 14 June –
  - Five Scotland fans are taken to hospital after their hire car crashed as they left an airport in Germany driving on the wrong side of the road.
  - The Independent Parliamentary Standards Authority clears Douglas Ross of misusing his travel expenses following an investigation.
  - The 2024 Birthday Honours are published. Among Scots to be recognised are former Prime Minister Gordon Brown, who becomes a Companion of Honour, and footballers Graeme Souness (CBE) and Ally McCoist (MBE).
- 16 June – Aberdeen City Council cancels the 2024 Highland Games shortly before it is due to commence following "heavier than forecast" rain.
- 17 June – NHS Dumfries and Galloway warns residents living in the area to assume some of their data has been published online after its database was hacked.
- 18 June – Scottish Labour launches its general election manifesto.
- 19 June –
  - The Scottish National Party launches its election manifesto, with plans to "end Westminster cuts" and increase investment in the NHS. The party would also view winning a majority of Scotland's seats at Westminster as a mandate to begin independence negotiations.
  - Labour suspends Andy Brown, its candidate for Aberdeenshire North and Moray East after he was found to have shared pro-Russian posts online.
  - The Scottish Family Party launches its election manifesto, chiefly promoting family values.
- 20 June –
  - Scottish Parliament authorities have launched an investigation into the potential misuse of expenses to buy postage stamps by members of the SNP in order to send letters to voters.
  - The GMB announces a series of strikes for staff at Whyte & Mackay beginning on 24 June after staff at the whisky distillery rejected the company's latest pay offer.
  - Police remove a group of 26 men from an EasyJet flight at Glasgow Airport over disruptive behaviour.
- 23 June – Scotland exit Euro 2024 at the group stage after losing 1–0 to Hungary.
- 24 June –
  - Scottish wildcat kittens have been born in the Cairngorms National Park, in a "major milestone" for the conservation of the Critically Endangered species.
  - The Scottish Conservatives launch their election manifesto, which includes plans to improve teachers' pay, cut the backlog of NHS waiting lists, and to beat the SNP.
- 25 June – The body of missing grandmother Hazel Nairn is identified after she went missing in floods at the River Don, near Monymusk, in November 2022. Her remains were discovered near Kemnay on 7 May.
- 26 June –
  - It is announced that the results of the 2022 Scottish Census will contain a breakdown of the country's LGBTQ community for the first time. The date, published the next day, shows that almost 184,000 people in Scotland identify as LGBT.
  - Officials confirm that the first batch of prisoners to be released early from prison in order to free up prison spaces have been freed.
- 28 June –
  - Edinburgh City Council establishes an emergency polling booth at City Chambers after a number of people across Scotland reported not receiving their postal votes. The emergency polling booth, which allows those who did not receive a postal vote to cast their vote in person, will operate until 30 June. Fife Council also announces an emergency polling booth at Fife House, Glenrothes that will be open on 29 June.
  - The final two second generation Glasgow Subway trains are taken out of service following the rollout of new third generation vehicles.
- 29 June – East Lothian Council becomes the third local authority to establish an emergency facility for people who have not received their postal votes.

=== July ===
- 1 July –
  - Balmoral Castle opens to the public for tours for the first time, with daily tours running until 4 August.
  - Steve Carson is to step down as Head of Multi-Platform Commissioning at BBC Scotland in September, in order to take up a senior role at Irish broadcaster RTÉ.
- 2 July – After rejecting a pay offer in May, waste and recycling staff belonging to Unite in half of Scotland's councils vote to strike.
- 3 July –
  - Queen Camilla and Prince Edward are formally appointed to the Order of the Thistle at a ceremony in Edinburgh.
  - Moray Council is ordered to pay £346,000 in compensation to a foster family who were wrongly accused of "sexual impropriety" involving children they fostered during the 2010s.
- 5 July –
  - 2024 United Kingdom general election in Scotland:
    - The SNP suffers heavy losses, going from 48 seats to just nine.
    - With 56 of the 57 seats contested in Scotland declared, Labour win 37, the SNP win nine, while the Conservatives and Liberal Democrats each win five.
  - Starmer ministry: The incoming Labour prime minister Keir Starmer appoints Ian Murray as Secretary of State for Scotland.
- 6 June –
  - 2024 United Kingdom general election in Scotland: Inverness, Skye and West Ross-shire becomes the final constituency to declare its election results, and sees the number of Liberal Democrat MPs rise to 6 in Scotland after they defeat the SNP to win the seat.
  - The number of COVID-19 hospital cases in Scotland have surpassed the previous winter's peak, data shows, with 448 people in hospital with the disease in the week ending 30 June, an increase on the previous week, and above the winter peak of 388.
  - A team looking into how the Cass Review could apply to Scotland's health services for children and young adults recommends the Scottish Government pause the use of puberty blockers until further research into them is conducted.
- 7 July – Keir Starmer makes his first visit to Scotland as prime minister, for a meeting with First Minister John Swinney.
- 9 July –
  - In an open letter to SNP members following the party's defeat in Scotland, former deputy leader Jim Sillars has described John Swinney's leadership as "a busted flush" and Nicola Sturgeon as "Stalin's wee sister".
  - Brian Boyd, the Provost of Angus, resigns after berating a female councillor to the point of tears at an open council meeting.
- 11 July –
  - The SNP confirms it will have to make the majority of its Westminster staff redundant after Parliament reduces its "Short Money" – the annual amount paid to opposition parties – by £1m.
  - Data from Public Health Scotland indicates there were 49 COVID-related deaths in the week ending 1 July, with numbers having increased on previous weeks, while data obtained by BBC News indicates that as many as 260,000 people in at risk groups had not received a booster vaccine during the Spring 2024 programme when it ended on 30 June.
  - The Court of Criminal Appeal reduces the sentence of teenager Daniel Haig, sentenced to life imprisonment for the 2021 murder of Justin McLaughlin, himself a teenager. Haig will now be required to serve 13 rather than 16 years before becoming eligible to be considered for parole following an appeal against the original sentence handed out in August 2023.
  - A pod of 77 whales dies after washing ashore on a beach in Orkney in what is believed to be the largest incident of its kind for several decades.
- 12–16 July – 2024 World Orienteering Championships at Edinburgh
- 13 July – Staff at Five Sisters Zoo confirm the death of Yampil, a black Asiatic bear who was rehomed from an abandoned zoo in Ukraine in January.
- 15 July – Figures show Edinburgh City Council issued over 6,000 low emission zone fines since the city's low emission zone was introduced.
- 17 July – Members of Unison at 14 Scottish council areas, including Glasgow, Perth and Kinross and Dumfries and Galloway, vote to take industrial action after describing a pay offer from COSLA as "inadequate".
- 19 July – Unison rejects the latest offer from Cosla aimed at preventing strikes by refuse collectors, which was worth 3.2%.
- 21 July – Data from Public Health Scotland for the week ending 14 July indicates there were 1,130 cases of COVID-19 in Scotland, but the health body believes cases may have peaked.
- 22 July –
  - Following the death of 17-year-old Jonathan Beadle at Polmont Young Offenders Institution on Saturday 13 July, the Scottish Government announces that nobody under the age of 18 will be kept in prison in Scotland from the week beginning 2 September.
  - Unite and the GMB follow Unison in rejecting the latest pay offer for refuse workers from Cosla.
- 23 July – The family of Allan Marshall, who died after being restrained by 17 prison officers at HMP Edinburgh in 2015, are to sue the Scottish Government under human rights legislation in what is believed to be the first case of its kind.
- 24 July – Researchers from the Scottish Association for Marine Science report evidence of dark oxygen being produced from manganese nodules on the seafloor. It was previously assumed that almost all the free oxygen (O2) on Earth was created through photosynthesis, which requires sunlight. The research has since come under criticism for methodological and ethical issues.
- 26 July –
  - Three men are killed in a car crash on a road near Dunmore; a woman also involved in the incident is being treated in hospital.
  - The Flow Country of Caithness and Sutherland is named as a World Heritage Site.
- 30 July – Unison confirms that refuse workers in 14 Scottish council areas will strike from 14 to 22 August.
- 31 July – The Unite and GMB unions announce eight days of strike action for refuse workers beginning on 14 August, which will include those working for Edinburgh City Council and occur during the Edinburgh Festival.

=== August ===
- 1 August – Stella Maris, the Rector of the University of St Andrews, is removed from the university's governing body over a letter she sent to students shortly after taking office in which she called for an immediate ceasefire in Gaza and referred to "genocidal attacks" made by the Israeli government. She will remain as Rector until October 2026, when her term ends.
- 4 August – A yellow weather warning is issued for heavy rain and strong winds in parts of Scotland, which is active until 9pm the following day.
- 6 August – Fiona Robertson, the chief executive of the Scottish Qualifications Authority, apologises after around 7,000 students who took their Higher examinations received blank emails instead of their results. The results were later sent by text message.
- 8 August – Cosla puts forward a new offer of a 3.6% increase for all grades of refuse workers in a bid to prevent strikes in 26 of Scotland's 32 council areas. The offer would represent a rise of £1,292 for the lowest paid, equivalent to a 5.63% increase.
- 8–12 August – The 82nd World Science Fiction Convention takes place in Glasgow.
- 9 August – 2024 United Kingdom riots: Police Scotland announces it is sending 120 of their officers to Belfast to help deal with ongoing riots in the city.
- 12 August – Unison, Unite and the GMB suspend planned strikes by refuse collectors following a new offer from Cosla.
- 13 August – Scotland's gender service for young people, based in Glasgow, announces it will stop accepting self-referrals.
- 14 August –
  - The annual Government Expenditure and Revenue Scotland report shows a public spending deficit of £22.7bn for Scotland during 2023, an increase of £3.6bn from the previous year.
  - The Scottish Government confirms it will follow the UK government by scrapping universal winter fuel payments for pensioners, with the benefit to be means tested.
  - Staff working on Edinburgh's tram network vote to take strike action over a lack of toilet breaks.
- 15 August – A shipwreck, believed to be that of HMS Hawke, which was sunk by a torpedo during World War I, has been found off the Aberdeenshire coast.
- 16 August –
  - 2024 Scottish Conservatives leadership election:
    - Four of the six candidates running for the position of Scottish Conservative leader call for the race to be paused after claims about Douglas Ross's behaviour as leader. The claims concern a report that in July 2023 Ross had asked for the leader of Moray council, Kathleen Robertson, to stand down as the prospective parliamentary candidate for Moray West, Nairn and Strathspey.
    - Meghan Gallacher resigns as the party's deputy leader, citing a "potential risk to the reputation of our party and the leadership contest" after reports that Ross had previously suggested Russell Findlay should succeed him.
  - Developers working on HM Prison Highland in Inverness have uncovered a prehistoric settlement believed to be around 2,000 years old.
- 17 August – SNP MSP John Mason is stripped of the party whip after a Twitter post in which he said that Israel's actions in Gaza did not amount to "genocide", something a party spokesperson describes as "completely unacceptable".
- 19 August –
  - A rocket being developed by Rocket Factory Augsburg, a German company hoping to launch the UK's first space flight, explodes during a launch test at the Shetland Space Centre.
  - The Scottish Government announces it will hold no further talks with Israeli ambassadors until there is "real progress" in resolving the Gaza conflict.
  - Christina McKelvie, the Scottish Government's Minister for Drugs and Alcohol Policy, announces she will step back from the role while receiving treatment for secondary breast cancer. Her duties will be assumed by fellow ministers Neil Gray and Jenni Minto.
- 20 August –
  - Data released by National Records of Scotland shows a 12% increase in the number of drug related deaths in Scotland during 2023, with 1,172 deaths that year, an increase of 121 from 2022.
  - Transport Scotland announces that its pilot scheme of subsidising peak-time ScotRail fairs will end in September, having not achieved the goal of encouraging more people to travel by train rather than by road.
- 21 August – Aberdeen City Council announces that several hundred properties in Aberdeen affected by Reinforced Autoclaved Aerated Concrete are to be demolished and rebuilt at a cost of £150m.
- 22 August –
  - Edinburgh City Council votes to introduce a tourist tax that it hopes will raise around £50m a year.
  - Highland Council announces that Inverness's Hogmanay celebration will not take place in 2024–25 due to capacity and rising costs.
- 23 August – Edinburgh City Council votes to introduce a temporary fireworks ban around Bonfire Night in the city's Niddrie, Balerno, Seafield and Calton Hill districts, becoming the first Scottish council to implement such a ban.
- 25 August – BBC Scotland News reports that Scotland's local authorities are to divert money used to restore nature projects to pay for wage increases.
- 26 August –
  - ASLEF suspends planned strike action for ScotRail drivers following a new pay offer, and will ballot its members on the offer.
  - The Scottish Government confirms it will suspend the Connecting Scotland programme which provides iPads and laptops to people who are "digitally excluded" in order to pay for council pay rises.
- 28 August – Justice Secretary Angela Constance confirms that around 470 prisoners have been released under emergency provisions to release prisoners early from their sentences.
- 30 August –
  - Cheyenne Naeb, an American philosophy student at the University of Dundee, who pushed a female member of railway staff in front of a stationary train at Glasgow Queen Street railway station in February 2023 after missing his train, is sentenced to 20 months in prison at Glasgow Sheriff Court.
  - During a closed-door session at the SNP Party Conference, leader John Swinney tells delegates the party's losses at the election occurred because it spent too much time focusing on the "process of independence". The comments are recorded and leaked to The Times, which publishes them the following day.

=== September ===
- 1 September – John Swinney gives his keynote speech to the SNP Annual Conference, saying that he will put the "people's priorities" at the heard of the Scottish Government, and that he will work to convince voters that Scottish independence is the "route" to delivering a fairer and stronger country.
- 2 September – The Scottish Government confirms that all young offenders under the age of 18 have been removed from Scotland's young offenders' institutions and transferred to more child-friendly accommodation.
- 3 September –
  - In a statement to the Scottish Parliament, Finance Secretary Shona Robison outlines £500m of spending cuts. She argues the cuts are needed because of an additional £800m in financial costs brought about by public sector pay deals, austerity from Westminster, inflation, the COVID-19 pandemic and the Russian invasion of Ukraine.
  - BBC News reports that the headquarters of GB Energy, the new government-backed energy company, will be in Aberdeen.
  - Members of the Unison trade union working for councils in Scotland reject an annual pay increase offer worth 3.6%, equivalent to at least £1,292.
- 4 September – The Scottish Government abandons an unfulfilled commitment to expand free school meals to all primary school pupils.
- 5 September – Scottish rugby player Scott Hastings confirms his wife, Jenny Hastings, has been reported missing after disappearing at a location used for wild swimming in the Firth of Forth on 3 September.
- 6 September –
  - The Daily Record reports that Police Scotland are to begin sending out a "custody user experience survey" via text message to anyone who spends a night in a police cell in Scotland.
  - Scottish climber Lorraine McCall becomes the first woman to climb all 231 Grahams in Scotland during a single journey.
- 7 September –
  - Police searching for Jenny Hastings, missing since 3 September, find a body at Hound Point in South Queensferry.
  - Several thousand anti-racism protestors, and a smaller number of anti-immigration protestors, march through Glasgow, which is the scene of violent clashes between the two groups.
- 9 September –
  - It is reported that a woman received a six-figure out-of-court settlement from Lanarkshire Council in 2023 after her adoption of a two-year-old child broke down when she was not made aware the boy had an underlying medical condition.
  - Data from the Scottish Prison Service shows that 188 prisoners, more than a third of the 477 released early over the summer as an emergency measure to free up prison spaces, were convicted of non-sexual violent crimes.
- 10 September – The body of a female fox is discovered near Balfour Hospital in Kirkwall, Orkney, even though Orkney has no known fox population.
- 11 September –
  - Figures released by the Scottish Prison Service indicate that the prison population is now higher than when its emergency release scheme began, with 8,241 people in prison in Scotland compared to 8,232 before the scheme began.
  - The Scottish Government loses a non-binding vote calling for the rollout of free school meals to all primary school pupils, with MSPs voting 64–2 for the motion.
- 13 September – Former nurse Adele Rennie is sentenced to two years and four months in prison and placed on the sex offenders' register for ten years after pleading guilty to stalking a woman online, while posing as a man, after the dating app Tinder matched them.
- 15 September – The A83 road in Argyll is reopened with a slight diversion after heavy rain caused a 500 tonne landslide.
- 17 September – Glasgow is formally selected as the host city of the Commonwealth Games in 2026.
- 18 September – Scotland experiences its warmest September day since 2019, with temperatures reaching 25 °C.
- 19 September –
  - The Scottish Government temporarily pauses a ban on wood burning stoves in new properties and property conversions following a review of the legislation.
  - Greenock Morton F.C. dismisses player Jay Emmanuel-Thomas after he appeared in court accused of attempting to orchestrate the smuggling of drugs into the UK.
- 20 September – A woman juror who used the Right Move app to research the floorplan of a house similar to one that was the scene of a rape during a trial is fined for contempt of court.
- 24 September –
  - Official figures show the number of households living in temporary accommodation has reached a record high, with 16,300 households in the system as of March 2024, the highest since records began in 2002.
  - Legislation comes into force preventing anti-abortion protests within 200 m (656 ft) of clinics where the procedure is carried out.
- 25 September –
  - ScotRail train drivers belonging to ASLEF have voted to accept a 4.5% pay rise backdated to April, ending their dispute.
  - Scottish comedian Janey Godley reveals she is receiving end-of-life care following the spread of her cancer.
- 27 September –
  - 2024 Scottish Conservatives leadership election: Russell Findlay is elected as the new leader of the Scottish Conservatives, succeeding Douglas Ross.
  - The scheme that scrapped peak time train fares in Scotland ends after almost a year.
- 28 September –
  - Charles III marks the 25th anniversary of the establishment of the Scottish Parliament at an event in Edinburgh.
  - Rachael Hamilton is appointed deputy leader of the Scottish Conservatives.
- 30 September – The minimum unit price of alcohol increases by 30% from 50p per unit to 65p per unit.

=== October ===
- 1 October – HM Coastguard's Search and Rescue unit suspends landings at most of Scotland's hospital helipads amod safety concerns.
- 2 October –
  - Scottish gangland boss Jamie "Iceman" Stevenson is sentenced to 20 years in prison after admitting to orchestrating a plot to smuggle £100m worth of cocaine from South America in boxes of bananas.
  - Data from the Scottish Government has indicated that 57 of the 477 prisoners released early to ease prison overcrowding were back in custody before the date of their original release, including 12 who were back in prison within ten days.
- 4 October – Data from Police Scotland indicates that instances of recorded hate crime have increased by 63% since the Hate Crime and Public Order Act became law in April.
- 5 October – Four people are treated in hospital after being struck by a taxi in central Glasgow.
- 6 October – A man is killed and three other people taken to hospital following an explosion at a block of flats in Alloa, Clackmannanshire.
- 8 October – MSPs back a nonbinding SNP motion by 99 votes to 14 calling on the UK government to reconsider their policy on winter fuel payments.
- 9 October –
  - Transport Secretary Fiona Hyslop announces that the public will be consulted on reducing speed limits in Scotland following an increase in the number of deaths on the roads.
  - The Crown Office announces it has dropped charges of human trafficking against businesswoman Ann Gloag.
- 10 October – The Scottish Government shelves plans for the early release of long term prisoners following concerns raised by victims groups, but will reduce the automatic early release for short term prisoners from the point of 50% completion of their sentence to 40%.
- 11 October – It is reported that Education Secretary Jenny Gilruth has withheld £145.5m in funding to all councils because of a disagreement over cuts to the number of teachers.
- 12 October – Alex Salmond, former first minister of Scotland, dies aged 69 in North Macedonia.
- 13 October –
  - Flags are lowered to half-mast at the Scottish Parliament following the death of former First Minister Alex Salmond the previous day.
  - MSP John Mason is expelled from the SNP after posting on Twitter that there was "no genocide" in Gaza.
- 14 October –
  - The Scottish Government confirms that ferry fares in Scotland will increase by 10% from 1 January 2025.
  - Glasgow City Council unveils plans to make improvements to the city centre, with the changes scheduled to begin in 2025.
- 16 October – Following trial and conviction at the High Court in Edinburgh, Jamie Boulton is sentenced to life imprisonment with at least 18 years in custody for the stabbing murder of Gary O'Neill at a flat in Leith in June 2023.
- 17 October – BBC One programme Crimewatch Live makes a fresh appeal for information leading to the discovery of the remains of Suzanne Pilley, who was murdered by her ex-partner in 2010.
- 18 October –
  - The body of former first minister Alex Salmond is flown from North Macedonia to Scotland in a private jet paid for by businessman Tom Hunter.
  - Former Daily Record editor Murray Foote announces he is standing down as chief executive of the SNP after 14 months in the post.
- 19 October – The SNP appoints Carol Beattie, a former chief executive of Stirling Council, as interim chief executive following the resignation of Murray Foote.
- 20 October – An amber weather alert is in place for western Scotland and the north and west of Northern Ireland as Storm Ashley arrives in the UK; yellow alerts are issued for other parts of Scotland, Northern Ireland and the Welsh coast.
- 21 October – Non-teaching staff at primary schools in John Swinney's Perth and Kinross constituency go on strike over pay and conditions, threatening a walkout that could last two weeks.
- 23 October –
  - Duncan Ferguson is dismissed as manager of Inverness Caledonian Thistle after the club goes into administration.
  - Jack Crawley is sentenced to life imprisonment with a minimum of 37 years for the October 2023 murder of army veteran Paul Taylor with a hammer in.
- 25 October – Dylan Brister and Cameron Allan are sentenced to minimum prison terms of 23 and 19 years respectively for the drugging, rape and murder of Calum Simpson, which occurred in November 2021.
- 29 October – The funeral of Alex Salmond is held at the parish church in Strichen, Aberdeenshire.

=== November ===
- 1 November – The Commissioner for Ethical Standards in Public Life in Scotland finds SNP councillor Kairin van Sweeden in breach of the code of conduct for calling a political opponent a "New Scot" during a meeting of Aberdeen City Council in October 2023.
- 2 November – A 74-year-old man receives fatal injuries after being struck by a bus in Edinburgh's Cowgate. The following day, Police Scotland ask members of the public to stop sharing graphic images of the incident on social media.
- 3 November – Police Scotland say they have received a fresh allegation concerning a non-recent sexual assault against former First Minister Alex Salmond.
- 5 November –
  - Senior consultants in Scotland have voted to accept a 10.5% pay rise that will see them earn between £10,500 and £13,500 extra each year, and which will be backdated to 1 April 2024.
  - A waste management company is to sue the Scottish Government for £170m over the failed bottle return scheme.
  - Bonfire Night disturbance breaks out in parts of Edinburgh, with missiles such as bricks, bottles and fireworks thrown at police.
- 6 November – Police Scotland say they have made 19 arrests following disturbances over Halloween and Bonfire Night.
- 8 November –
  - The death certificate of Susan McGowan, a 58-year-old nurse from North Lanarkshire who died in September, has linked her death with the use of the weight loss drug tirzepatide (known under the brand name Mounjaro), which was recently approved for use on the NHS; it is reported to be the first UK death linked to the drug's use.
  - The Scottish Government confirms it is ditching plans to ban the installation of wood burning stoves in newbuild properties and conversions.
- 9 November – Internet cables have been laid in water pipes, bringing fibre optic broadband to the Orkney island of Papa Westray in what is reported to be the first example of such a system being installed in the UK.
- 12 November –
  - A judicial review begins into the UK Government's consent to extract resources from the Rosebank oil and gas field.
  - Stephen Flynn, the SNP's leader at Westminster, announces his intention to stand at the 2026 Scottish Parliament election.
- 13 November –
  - The UK government tells the judicial review into the approval of the Rosebank Oil and Gas Field that the approval was given unlawfully.
  - Edinburgh City Council approves plans to move several hundred homeless people out of unlicensed accommodation by the end of the month.
- 14 November –
  - The Scottish Government further delays its plans to establish a National Care Service, but remains committed to the proposal.
  - Neil Gray, Scotland's Health and Social Care Secretary, apologises to the Scottish Parliament for not attending a "wider range" of football matches after he used a chauffeur driven vehicle to attend four games at Aberdeen F.C., something he says gave the impression he was acting "more as a fan and less as a minister".
- 15 November – Stephen McCabe resigns as leader of Inverclyde Council after appearing in court charged with assault and threatening behaviour.
- 16 November –
  - The SNP's National Executive Committee proposes cutting the number of staff at its headquarters from 26 to 16.
  - Ruth Maguire, MSP for Cunninghame South, announces she will not seek re-election at the 2026 Scottish Parliament election because she is to undergo treatment for cancer.
- 17 November – At 12pm, Tesco opens its branch in Stornaway, Isle of Lewis for the first time on a Sunday, the Western Isles being the only place in the UK where the majority of shops remain closed on a Sunday.
- 19 November –
  - Scottish Labour leader Anas Sarwar says his party will expand the eligibility for winter fuel payments in Scotland if they win the 2026 Scottish Parliament election.
  - Eric Trump, the son of Donald Trump, confirms the US President-elect will visit Scotland in 2025 to open a new golf course.
  - The Scottish Government is reported to be preparing to reduce the minimum term served by prisoners given short sentences, which could lead to the early release of between 260 and 390 prisoners in February 2025.
- 20 November – The Children and Young People's Commissioner Scotland launches an investigation into Police Scotland's use of force against children.
- 21 November –
  - Stephen Flynn, the SNP's leader at Westminster, says he will not seek a dual mandate by standing for the Scottish Parliament while he remains an MP.
  - Traditional Scottish singer Iona Fyfe is named as the new Rector of the University of Aberdeen, succeeding Martina Chukwuma–Ezike, and will take up the post on 1 January 2025.
- 22 November – With Storm Bert set to arrive in Scotland the following day, bringing snow and ice, Police Scotland urges motorists not to travel.
- 23 November – Police Scotland arrest seven people in connection with Bonfire Night disturbances in the Pollokshields area of Glasgow.
- 24 November –
  - Alex Cole-Hamilton, the leader of the Scottish Liberal Democrats says his party will vote down the Scottish Government's upcoming budget if it contains even a "penny" promoting Scottish independence.
  - Police charge a senior British Army officer over an incident during which he took decommissioned hand grenades through security at Edinburgh Airport on 16 October.
- 25 November – 50 non-essential workers are evacuated from the Valaris 120 oil rig 150 miles off the coast of Aberdeen following a crash with a vessel.
- 26 November – Aberdeen Football Club withdraws an application for a temporary alcohol licence.
- 27 November – The Scottish Government launches a public consultation on potential sped limit changes that could see the speed limit reduced from 60 mph to 50 mph for cars on single carriageways, but increased from 40 mph to 50 mph for HGV vehicles. HGVs could also have speed limits on dual carriageways increased to 60 mph.
- 28 November –
  - The Scottish Government announces that all pensioner households will receive a Winter Fuel Payment from Winter 2025–26, with those on Pension Credit receiving £200 or £300 dependent on age and the rest receiving £100.
  - The Scottish Government abandons plans to upgrade the A96 between Aberdeen and Inverness to make it a full dual carriageway by 2030.
  - The NHS Grampian health board announcing it is to divert ambulance patients to hospitals outside its area because of "critical" pressure on its largest hospital.
- 29 November –
  - Finlay MacDonald, who carried out a series of shootings on the Isle of Skye and the Scottish mainland, which included the fatal shooting of his brother-in-law, is sentenced to life imprisonment with a minimum term of 28 years.
  - GP leaders in Scotland vote in favour of a motion to ballot workers on industrial action over pay, following what they describe as "years of disinvestment in general practice".
- 30 November – The Proclaimers perform at a memorial service for former first minister Alex Salmond, held at Edinburgh's St Giles' Cathedral.

=== December ===
- 1 December – NHS Grampian suspends visiting at Dr Gray's Hospital in Elgin following an outbreak of vomiting and diarrhoea.
- 3 December –
  - A teenage boy is sentenced to life imprisonment with a minimum of 18 years for the murder of Danielle Davidson, who was stabbed with a Rambo-style knife following an argument over a e-scooter in Edinburgh in May 2023.
  - A report by Audit Scotland says that fundamental changes are required in the way NHS Scotland provides services are "urgently needed" and that "difficult decisions" about whether some services can continue to be provided may need to be taken.
- 4 December –
  - Finance Secretary Shona Robison delivers the 2024 budget, which includes planned changes to taxation and a pledge to scrap the two child benefit cap in Scotland.
  - Rocket manufacturer Orbex announces plans to pause the construction of a spaceport in Sutherland in order to focus on the construction of its SaxaVord Spaceport site in Shetland.
- 6 December –
  - First Minister John Swinney and Prime Minister Keir Starmer hold private talks about the Scottish Government's plans to scrap the two child benefit cap, which are later described as "helpful".
  - A single case of bovine spongiform encephalopathy (BSE) has been identified on a farm in Dumfries and Galloway, authorities confirm.
  - Professor Iain Gillespie resigns as principal of Dundee University following controversy over a £7,000 business trip he and a colleague took to Hong Kong.
- 7 December –
  - Storm Darragh: An amber warning for high winds, and yellow warnings for wind and rain, are in place in Scotland. Damage caused by the storm includes at Castle Douglas High School where the roof of the building was partially blown off.
  - Coastguard searching for a commercial scallop diver, missing in Scapa Flow, Orkney since 27 November, find a body.
  - A 19-year-old man is killed, and three other people injured, in a crash on the outskirts of Inverurie, Aberdeenshire.
  - A 41-year-old woman, subsequently named as Michelle McLeod, is killed in a dog attack at a flat in Aberdeen.
- 8 December –
  - Police Scotland confirm human remains have been found in the wreckage of a plane discovered in the North Sea, near Lerwick, Shetland.
  - Scottish Labour suspends Cammy Day, the leader of Edinburgh City Council, pending the outcome of a police investigation into alleged inappropriate behaviour.
- 9 December –
  - Cammy Day confirms he has stepped down as leader of Edinburgh City Council after Police Scotland launched an investigation into allegations he bombarded Ukrainian refugees with questions, including those of a sexual nature.
  - BBC Scotland announces the launch of two new news programmes in early 2025: Reporting Scotland: News at Seven, a weeknight news bulletin presented by Laura Maciver and Amy Irons on the BBC Scotland channel from 6 January, and the Scotcast podcast with Martin Geissler launching on 13 January.
- 10 December –
  - A Scottish Government spokesman confirms that First Minister John Swinney has spoken by phone with US President-elect Donald Trump for the first time since his re-election, and described the 20 minute discussion as "positive".
  - The Scottish Government backs plans to bar dual mandates – MSPs who also sit as MPs or members of the House of Lords – from sitting at Holyrood after the 2026 Scottish Parliament election.
- 11 December – The Scottish Government announces that Scotland will follow the UK's permanent ban on the use of puberty blockers for under-18s questioning their gender.
- 12 December – Catholic priest Father Daniel Doherty is sentenced to 16 months in prison after sexually assaulting a sleeping man on a train to Edinburgh.
- 13 December – The Glasgow South Western Line is closed between Carlisle and Gretna after a HGV crashes off the A74(M) motorway onto the railway line near Gretna; the driver is arrested and charged over the incident.
- 14 December – Seven people are taken to hospital for treatment, with one man in a critical condition, after the roof of a double-decker bus is torn off when it collides with a railway bridge in Glasgow City Centre after taking a wrong turn.
- 15 December –
  - Violence and disorder breaks out in Glasgow city centre ahead of the Scottish League Cup final between Celtic and Rangers at Hampden Park.
  - An IT issue forces flights at Edinburgh Airport to be suspended for several hours.
- 17 December –
  - MSPs vote unanimously in favour of plans to ban dual mandates.
  - Following an external review into the use of messaging services, Deputy First Minister Kate Forbes announces that Scottish Government ministers and staff will be banned from using WhatsApp for official business.
  - Former First Minister Humza Yousaf announces he will step down as an MSP at the 2026 Scottish Parliament election.
  - Edinburgh City Council says it is taking steps to prevent harmful content from being accessed on school-issued iPads after it emerged content such as pornography and violence can be viewed by students, even with internet filters in place.
- 18 December – Reform UK confirms that Craig Campbell, a party official in Scotland, has been removed from his post after revelations his family has links to Ulster Loyalists and has a relatives who was convicted of murdering a Celtic fan.
- 19 December –
  - A double-decker bus has its roof torn off after crashing into a railway bridge in Kilmarnock.
  - Jane Meagher is voted to replace Cammy Day as leader of Edinburgh City Council, and will lead a Labour minority administration.
  - Alan Edwards, an extremist who holds homophobic and antisemitic views and amassed an "armoury" at his home in Falkirk, and discussed launching an attack on a local LGBT group, is sentenced to ten years imprisonment. His sentence also includes a five year supervision order upon release.
- 23 December –
  - The pilot of a light aircraft is killed in an air crash near Fife Airport.
  - An investigation into the December 2023 Broughty Ferry train crash finds that a train collided with a fallen tree because a warning did not reach the driver in time.
- 24 December – The Scottish Ambulance Service is put on the highest level of emergency due to "significant pressure" placed on services.
- 27 December –
  - The Met Office issues a yellow weather warning for rain over Hogmanay, starting on 30 December and lasting over the New Year.
  - Public Health Scotland says health services in Scotland are under "acute pressure" following a surge in flu cases.
  - Caledonian MacBrayne is forced to reduce the number of passengers allowed on the MV Isle of Mull to 45 per journey after failing a safety check.
- 29 December – Emergency services searching for keen wild swimmer Ian Napier, missing from the Scousburgh Bay area since 27 December, find a body in the sea near Shetland.
- 30 December –
  - Edinburgh's Hogmanay celebrations are cancelled amid weather warnings for heavy rain, high winds and snow over the New Year.
  - 2025 New Year Honours: Among those to be recognised in the New Year Honours are broadcaster Jackie Bird (MBE), footballer and broadcaster Alan Hansen (MBE) and Olympic swimmer Duncan Scott (OBE).

== Sports ==
- 2024 Scottish Rally Championship

== Holidays ==
- 1 January – New Year's Day
- 2 January – New Year Holiday
- 29 March – Good Friday
- 6 May – Early May bank holiday
- 27 May – Spring May Bank Holiday
- 5 August – August Bank Holiday
- 30 November – Saint Andrew's Day
- 25 December – Christmas Day
- 26 December – Boxing Day

== Deaths ==
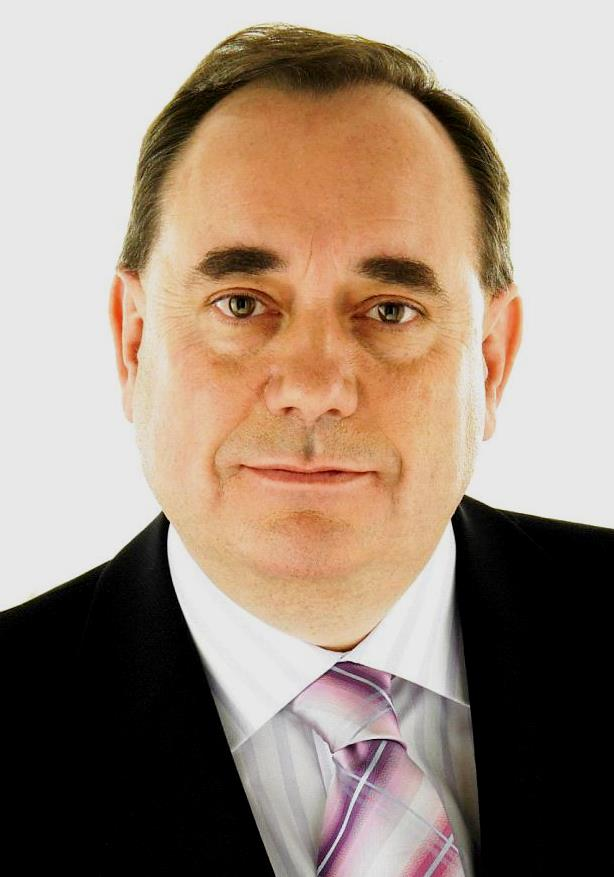
Alex Salmond in 2007

- 15 January – Denis Connaghan, 79, footballer (Celtic, St Mirren, Morton). (death announced on this date)
- 27 January – Stuart Gray, 50, footballer (Celtic, Reading, Rushden & Diamonds), cancer. (death announced on this date)
- 30 January – Ally Shewan, 83, footballer (Aberdeen) and manager (Elgin City). (death announced on this date)
- 4 February – Mallorca Lee, 51, DJ, producer, (Ultra-Sonic), (Public Domain).
- 9 February – Peter Handyside, 49, footballer (Grimsby Town, Stoke City, Barnsley).
- 16 February – Ian McMillan, 92, footballer (Airdrieonians, Rangers, national team). (death announced on this date)
- 23 February – Harry Melrose, 88, footballer (Dunfermline Athletic, Aberdeen, Berwick Rangers) and manager. (death announced on this date)
- 24 February – Stewart Robertson, 75, conductor. (death announced on this date)
- 29 February – Tiffany Scott, 32, sex offender and transgender prisoner.
- 7 March – Nick Sheridan, 32, Irish journalist and television presenter (News2day, Reporting Scotland, The Nine) (Death announced on this date)
- 14 March – Angela McCluskey, 64, Scottish singer (Wild Colonials) and songwriter ("Breathe").
- 15 March – Peter Kelly, 82, Scottish actor (The Tall Guy, Welcome to Sarajevo).
- 18 March – Peter McAleese, 81, Scottish soldier and mercenary.
- 20 March – Billy Kellock, 70, Scottish footballer (Cardiff City, Peterborough United, Wolverhampton Wanderers).
- 29 March – Iain McChesney, 79, Scottish footballer (Queen of the South).
- 14 April –
  - Vincent Friell, 64, Scottish actor (Trainspotting, Restless Natives, The Angels' Share).
  - Willie Limond, 45, Scottish boxer and footballer (Albion Rovers), complications from a seizure.
- 18 April – Dave Moyes, 68, Scottish footballer (Berwick Rangers, Meadowbank Thistle, Dunfermline Athletic).
- 23 April – Fergie MacDonald, 86, Scottish accordionist.
- 28 April – Brian McCardie, 59, Scottish actor (Rob Roy, Speed 2: Cruise Control, Ellie Parker) and writer.
- 29 April – Christian, 80, Scottish singer and entertainer.
- 3 May – Jim Rodger, 90, Scottish footballer (St Mirren, Rangers, Queen of the South).
- 14 May – Gudrun Ure, 98, Scottish actress (Super Gran, The Million Pound Note, The Crow Road).
- 20 May – Gerry Collins, 69, Scottish football player (Ayr United, Hamilton Academical, Partick Thistle) and manager.
- 22 May – David Wilkie, 70, Scottish swimmer, Olympic champion (1976), world champion (1973, 1975), cancer.
- 29 May – John Burnside, 69, Scottish writer and poet.
- 5 June – David Scott, 83, Scottish journalist and broadcaster (Scottish Daily Express, BBC Scotland, STV). (death announced on this date)
- 18 June – Billy Abercromby, 65, Scottish footballer (St Mirren, Partick Thistle, Dunfermline Athletic). (death announced on this date)
- 26 June – Pat Heywood, 92, actress (Lucky Feller, Wuthering Heights, Inspector Morse, Root Into Europe)
- 27 June – Donald Scott, 96, Scottish rugby union player (Langholm, South of Scotland District, national team).
- 28 July – John Anderson, 92, Scottish television personality (Gladiators).
- 4 August – Jim Doherty, 65, Scottish footballer (Kilmarnock, Clyde, Queen of the South).
- 5 August – George Herd, 88, Scottish football player (Sunderland, national team) and manager (Queen of the South).
- 6 August –
  - Ron Bain, 79, Scottish actor (Naked Video, A Kick Up the Eighties) and director (I, Lovett). (death announced on this date)
  - Bobby Thomson, 87, Scottish footballer (Aston Villa, Birmingham City).
- 9 August – Brian Marjoribanks, 82, Scottish footballer (Hibernian), actor and broadcaster (BBC Scotland).
- 12 August – Alex Kinninmouth, 82, Scottish footballer (Dundee, Dunfermline Athletic, Forfar Athletic). (death announced on this date)
- 2 September – Mick Cullen, 93, Scottish footballer (Luton Town, Grimsby Town, national team).
- 3 September – Flora Fraser, 21st Lady Saltoun, 93, Scottish peer, member of the House of Lords (1979–2014).
- 6 September – Ron Yeats, 86, Scottish footballer (Dundee United, Liverpool, Tranmere Rovers).
- 17 September – Kenny Hyslop, 73, Scottish drummer (Slik, Zones, Simple Minds). (death announced on this date)
- 18 September – Sam Malcolmson, 77, Scottish-born New Zealand footballer (Queen of the South, Albion Rovers, national team).
- 10 October – Peter Cormack, 78, Scottish football player (Liverpool, national team) and manager (Partick Thistle).
- 12 October
  - Jackmaster, 38, Scottish DJ and record producer.
  - Alex Salmond, 69, politician, first minister (2007–2014).
- 13 October – Jim Liddle, 66, Scottish footballer (Forfar Athletic, Cowdenbeath, Hamilton Academical).
- 22 October –
  - Jim McColl, 89, Scottish horticulturalist and television presenter (Beechgrove).
  - Myra McFadyen, 68, Scottish actress (Made of Honor, Mamma Mia!, Emma). (death announced on this date)
- 25 October – Tommy Callaghan, 78, Scottish football player (Dunfermline Athletic, Celtic, Clydebank) and manager.
- 2 November – Janey Godley, 63, Scottish stand-up comedian and writer.
- 10 November – Derrick Grant, 86, Scottish rugby union player (Hawick, national team).
- 22 November – Kenny Aird, 77, Scottish footballer (St Mirren, St Johnstone, Heart of Midlothian).
- 28 November – John McNamee, 83, Scottish footballer (Newcastle United, Hibernian, Blackburn Rovers). (death announced on this date)
- 4 December – John Docherty, 84, Scottish football player (Brentford) and manager (Millwall, Cambridge United). (death announced on this date)
- 11 December – Alex Edwards, 78, Scottish footballer (Dunfermline Athletic, Hibernian).
- 28 December – Charlie Wright, 86, Scottish football player (Grimsby Town, Charlton Athletic) and manager (Bolton Wanderers)

== See also ==
- 2024 in Northern Ireland
- Politics of Scotland
