= Margaret Haney =

British criminal

- Born: c.1942
- Died: 21 August 2013 (aged 70–71)
- Other name: Big Mags
- Occupation: Drug trafficker
- Years active: 1990s - 2001
- Known for: Drug trafficking, anti-pedophile activism
- Penalty: 12 years in prison

Margaret Haney (c. 1942 – 21 August 2013), also known as Big Mags, was a British drug trafficker and vigilante. She was widely covered by British media in the late 1990s.

== History ==
In the 1990s, Haney led a drug trafficking organization composed by her family members. The group became known in tabloid media as the "family from hell". According to BBC News, the criminal enterprise was also responsible for a wave of thefts and violence in the communities it operated in. The enterprise first operated in Raploch until it was chased out of the area by 400-people mob. The family continued to be targeted by angry mobs afterwards, which would destroy the homes they planned to relocate to, and ultimately ended up in a homeless shelter.

Throughout the 1990s, Haney appeared across multiple anti-pedophile protests across the country, forcing multiple people out of the homes they intended to live. In one instance, she led a mob that drove a man convicted of sexual abuse out of Raploch. Haney was invited to BBC's Kilroy show to talk about the topic, and was the subject of a Scotland Frontline documentary. She was repeatedly covered by the media at the time for her activities against pedophiles.

Haney was arrested in 2001 for drug-related charges and sentenced to 12 years in prison in 2003. Her daughter Diane, niece Roseann and son Hugh were sentenced to nine, seven and five years of prison time, respectively. They appealed their sentences and lost. She was released from prison in 2009 and died from cancer, aged 70, on 21 August 2013.

A six-episode podcast titled The Ballad of Big Mags was published by BBC Sounds in 2025.
