= Storm Darragh =

2024 windstorm over northwestern Europe

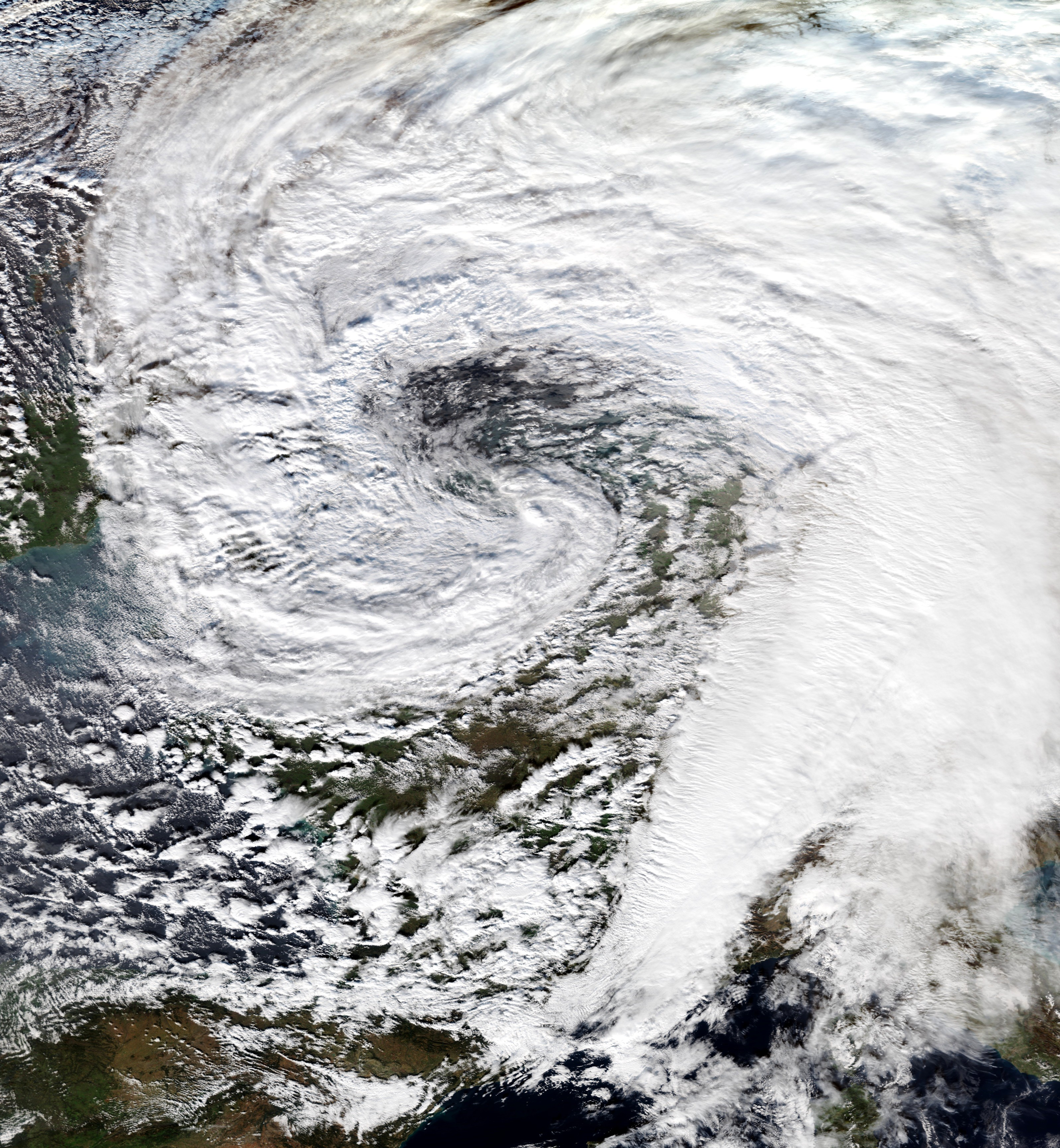
- Storm Darragh on 7 December 2024

Meteorological history
- Formed: 5 December 2024
- Dissipated: 9 December 2024

Extratropical cyclone
- Highest gusts: 96 mph (154 km/h) at Berry Head
- Lowest pressure: 977 hPa (mbar); 28.85 inHg

Overall effects
- Fatalities: 4: United Kingdom: 3; France: 1
- Injuries: 7+: United Kingdom: 4; France: 2; Netherlands: 1
- Areas affected: Belgium, France, Ireland, Netherlands, United Kingdom
- Power outages: 2,319,950+: United Kingdom: 1,874,950+; Ireland: 395,000+; France: 50,000+
- Part of the 2024–25 European windstorm season

Storm Darragh (known as Storm Xaveria in Germany) was an extratropical cyclone which severely impacted Ireland and the United Kingdom in December 2024. The fourth named storm of the 2024–25 European windstorm season, Darragh was named by the UK Met Office on 5 December 2024.

== Impact ==
=== Belgium ===
The Royal Meteorological Institute (KMI) issued a yellow wind warning covering West Flanders from 10 a.m. on 7 December to 11 a.m. the following day. The storm reportedly caused gusts of 85 km/h (53 mph) in the province.

=== France ===
Météo-France issued amber wind alerts for nine departments from 6 a.m. to 6 p.m. on 7 December, warning of "sometimes violent gusts of wind, particularly on coastlines exposed to west to northwest winds". SNCF suspended all rail services on Normandy's 'Nomad' from 7–8 December, as well as some services in Brittany, Pays de la Loire and Nouvelle-Aquitaine.

On 7 December, a gust of 159 km/h (99 mph) was recorded at 7 p.m. near Carteret in Normandy. Enedis reported that 13,000 customers were without power in Brittany. Traffic was prohibited from crossing the Brotonne, Grand Canal du Havre, Normandy and Tancarville bridges and due to high winds. A 60-year-old man was injured near Arras when a tree fell on his car.

On 8 December, the body of a 66-year-old man, who had been reported missing earlier that day, was found in a river near Mesnil-Mauger; the incident is believed to be flood-related. In Brittany and Normandy, Enedis reported that over 50,000 homes were still without power. The unloaded 120-metre barge AMT Challenger, without crew, ran aground on a beach at Sotteville-sur-Mer; it had broken free from its tug while sheltering near the Isle of Wight on 6 December, and been drifting in the English Channel in British and then French waters for two days, defying all attempts to reconnect. In Coquelles, a man was injured after a tree fell on his car and the roof of a nursing home was blown off.

=== Ireland ===
Met Éireann issued red wind warnings for seven counties from 9 p.m. on 6 December whilst the rest of the country was under orange warnings from 8 p.m. A yellow wind warning also covered the country from 3 p.m. on 5 December until 3 p.m. on 7 December, as well as a yellow rain warning covering thirteen counties from 10 a.m. on 6 December to 10 a.m. the next day.

A gust of 141 km/h (88 mph) was recorded at Mace Head at 11 p.m. on 6 December. On 7 December around 395,000 people in Ireland lost power and many flights at Dublin Airport had been cancelled; 12 flights at Cork Airport were cancelled and a further 11 were diverted. Irish Ferries cancelled multiple sailings to France and the UK, Bus Éireann services experienced significant disruption and many rail services were disrupted. Road travel was also disrupted by debris and fallen trees across the country. The ESB said the storm's impact was greater than that of Storm Ophelia in 2017. On 8 December, Uisce Éireann said it had restored water supplies to 40,000 customers.

=== Netherlands ===
The Royal Netherlands Meteorological Institute (KNMI) issued a code yellow warning for 6 December covering all of the Netherlands save Limburg, North Brabant and Zeeland provinces. Over 100 flights at Schiphol Airport were cancelled on 6 December due to the storm. Ferry services from Terschelling to Ameland and Harlingen were cancelled and many train services were disrupted by fallen trees. Several ships got into trouble in the North Sea on 6 December. The cargo vessel 'Valday', which was drifting rudderlessly, had to be towed to Rotterdam after several attempts, one of which left a crew member injured.

=== United Kingdom ===
On 6 December the Met Office issued a rare red weather warning for wind covering the Welsh coast from Anglesey to the Severn Estuary and the Somerset and north Devon coasts valid from 3 a.m. to 11 a.m. on 7 December. Further wind warnings included an amber warning covering Northern Ireland, Great Britain's west coast south of Galloway and much of South West England and a yellow warning covering the rest of the UK except for the Scottish Highlands. Further weather warnings included an amber rain warning covering South East Wales, a yellow rain warning covering Northern Ireland, Southern Scotland and the rest of Wales, and a yellow snow warning for Central Scotland. In response to the red weather warning, roughly 3 million people in the affected areas of Wales and South West England were sent emergency alerts on their mobile phones in the largest use of the warning system since its official launch in early 2023.

Two possible tornadoes were reported in Kidsgrove and Wakefield. The Kidsgrove tornado also affected Talke at around 5 p.m. on 5 December and uprooted 150 trees in Clough Hall Park, took roof tiles off homes and took down fences. The next day, a suspected tornado struck Outwood, Wakefield, and damaged roofs and cars, shattered a greenhouse and smashed windows.

Travel disruption included flights being cancelled and delayed at multiple airports, including Belfast, Bristol, Cardiff, Heathrow and Manchester. The Second Severn Crossing, Dartford Crossing and Severn Bridge were all closed. Numerous sporting events scheduled for 7 December were cancelled or postponed due to the storm: all domestic football and rugby matches in Wales, including the Championship game between Cardiff City and Watford; the Premier League Merseyside derby; and horse races in Aintree and Chepstow. Countless Christmas events across the UK were cancelled and all of The Royal Parks were closed.

Strong gusts were recorded across Wales and South West England overnight on 7 December, with 96 mph (154 km/h) recorded at Berry Head in Devon and 93 mph (150 km/h) at Capel Curig in North Wales. A man in his 40s died on the A59 road in Longton, Lancashire at around 9 a.m. when a tree fell onto his van. A second man died when a tree fell on his car shortly after 3 p.m. in Erdington, a suburb of Birmingham. On 8 December, former rugby union player Tom Voyce was reported missing having not returned home from an evening with friends, prompting a search by Northumbria Police; they recovered his car from the flooded River Aln and believe he attempted to cross Abberwick Ford but was pulled away by the strong current. Two days later it was announced he was presumed dead, having drowned in the floodwaters near Alnwick. On 10 December the National Grid reported that 21,242 properties in England and Wales were still without power and that 1,853,708 had been reconnected. Heavy rain from the storm prompted 44 flood warnings and over 200 flood alerts in England and Wales.

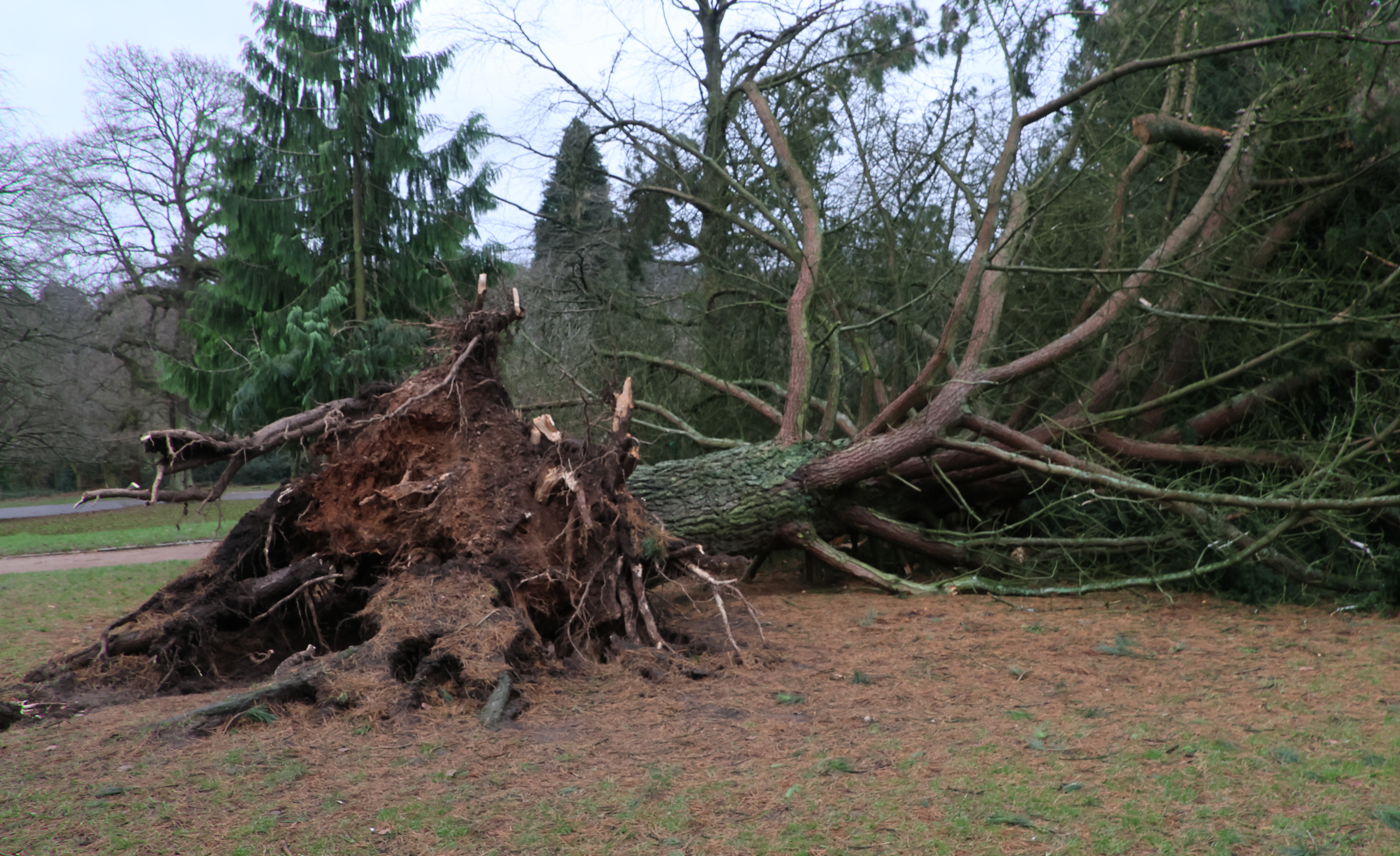
An uprooted tree at Warley Woods in Oldbury, West Midlands.

In England, British Airways cancelled over 100 domestic and European flights from Heathrow Airport and diverted transatlantic flights from the US to Brussels Airport. A road in Somerset was closed after a tower block was unroofed. The roofs of Chippenham and Westbury railway stations were damaged, causing most trains passing through there to be cancelled. The Rigger, a music venue in Newcastle-under-Lyme, was unroofed amid the strong winds. Falling trees caused multiple injuries in the country: a man was seriously injured in Leamington Spa; a driver suffered minor injuries in Somerset; and a person was injured in Widnes. Floods were reported in many parts of North Yorkshire, including Kirkbymoorside, Nunnington and Pickering; people were rescued from their vehicles after becoming trapped in floodwater in Danby and Marton. The lifeboat ramp was destroyed at Hemsby in Norfolk, where the storm also hastened the Holderness coastline's erosion.

In Northern Ireland, a Translink bus driver was taken to hospital after crashing into a building shortly after 3 a.m. near Antrim. The Ballylumford Power Station had to suspend production after one of its chimneys was damaged, and a loyalist mural in Mount Vernon was destroyed by high winds.

In Scotland, Castle Douglas High School in Dumfries and Galloway had a large section of its roof torn off and thrown onto another section of the school. A Stena Line ferry which had departed Cairnryan in Scotland just before 1 a.m. was stranded off the west coast of Northern Ireland after it was unable to berth at Belfast until 5 p.m.

In Wales, Dyfed-Powys Police declared a major incident in Carmarthenshire, Ceredigion, Pembrokeshire, and Powys. Llandudno Pier suffered significant damage, which the owner estimated would cost over £250,000 to repair: Penderyn Store, one of its original 148-year-old kiosks, was torn from its foundations and tipped sideways; the ice cream stand at the end of the pier was ripped up and thrown into the sea; and the toilets and bar cellar were unroofed. The Pentre Baptist Church in Mochdre, had its roof ripped off entirely, as did a nursery in New Quay and a block of flats in Porthcawl had part of its roof torn off. At least 40 trees were felled in Rhondda Cynon Taf. Floods occurred in Builth Wells after the River Wye burst its banks, and in Mold. Large pieces of the roof of Briton Ferry RFC's clubhouse was torn off, narrowly missing bystanders. The storm damaged the infrastructure at the Port of Holyhead, forcing its closure and the cancellation of all ferries between there and Dublin until 16 January. Terminal 3 at Holyhead was not scheduled to reopen until 15 July 2025. According to Scottish Power and the National Grid, around 11,000 homes in Wales were still without power on 10 December, and a councillor in Pembrokeshire spoke of his fears that "people are going to freeze to death". Openreach said that 6,500 people in Wales had their internet service impacted, with 50 overhead cables and 40 telegraph poles coming down during the storm. The Porth Wen Solar Farm in Anglesey, North Wales sustained severe damage with hundreds of solar panels and a wind turbine destroyed.

== See also ==
- Weather of 2024
- 2024 United Kingdom floods
