= Samantha Poling =

Scottish investigative journalist

Samantha Poling is a Scottish investigative journalist working for BBC Scotland and BBC Panorama.

== Early life and career ==
Raised in Helensburgh, after graduation Poling joined the Northumberland Gazette in Alnwick as a trainee reporter. She returned to Scotland in 1995, working on the Helensburgh Advertiser.

In 1996, she moved to the national press, covering stories such as the Dunblane massacre and reporting from Paris on the death of Diana, Princess of Wales.

== Career ==
=== BBC Scotland ===
In 1998 she joined BBC Scotland, and later became the channel's Health Correspondent. She still works for the channel on BBC Scotland Investigates.

In 2002 she moved into investigative journalism, making the film The Untouchable about a senior police officer who had raped and stalked women whom he had met through his work. He was later jailed for 12 years for the attacks. She then joined Frontline, making investigative films, including the award-winning Critical Error which investigated overdoses in radiotherapy treatment for cancer patients in hospitals around the UK, which prompted changes in the way radiotherapy dosages are delivered. She later spent time in Iraq filming a documentary about the Argyll and Sutherland Highlanders, and travelled to India to examine the call centre industry for a programme about banking.

In 2004, Poling made the multi-award-winning film Security Wars, in which she went undercover to expose a cartel of gunmen and convicted murderers involved in lucrative national security contracts. The film forced the legislative tightening-up of security legislation, and won Poling the first of her three BAFTAs.

In October 2012, Poling filmed Britain’s Private War, which exposed flaws in G4S's security vetting procedures. These directly led to contractor Daniel Fitzsimons killing Paul McGuigan from Peebles and Australian Darren Hoare in a vodka-fuelled squabble, only 36 hours after he had arrived in Baghdad's highly securitised Green Zone.

In 2018 she interviewed Iain Packer for a documentary on the BBC Scotland program Disclosure, Packer denied the murder of Emma Caldwell and stated that he had never been violent towards women. Within days of the documentary being broadcast, one of his former partners went to the police to complain that Packer had pushed her onto a bed, put his hands around her throat, choked her to her injury, and to danger of life. Packer later admitted the charge, he was convicted and sentenced to jail for two years. In February 2024 Packer was eventually found guilty of the murder of Caldwell, and of 33 other charges against 22 women. Packer was sentenced to a minimum term of 36 years before he would be able to apply for parole, the second longest sentence in Scottish legal history after Angus Sinclair.

=== BBC Panorama ===
In 2008 she joined BBC Panorama and made the programme Britain's Protection Racket, which exposed the Security Industry Authority as being deeply flawed. She then made Crime Pays while working undercover in 2009, which included an interview with the UK's leading cocaine trafficker telling her how he laundered his money from deals in Estonia, to show how organised crime was defeating government attempts to claw back its profits. Poling won her third BAFTA for the investigation. In 2010, she wrote, filmed and created Can I Sack Teacher?, about the fact that only 18 UK teachers had been struck off for incompetence in the previous 40 years.

In 2011, she exposed petrol-laundering gangs in Northern Ireland, and exposed the quality issues within the surgical instrument manufacturing industry in Pakistan that were supplying in bulk to the National Health Service. In Smoking and the Bandits, she exposed the UK's counterfeit cigarette gangs, was attacked while filming in Barras market, and discovered record levels of toxins in the products.

=== Other programmes ===
In 2015, she presented The Dog Factory, a one-off programme about the puppy farm industry for BBC One.
