= Murder of Emma Caldwell =

2005 kidnap, rape, and murder in Scotland

Emma Caldwell
- Emma Caldwell
- Born: 31 January 1978; Cardross, Argyll and Bute, Scotland
- Disappeared: c.6 April 2005
- Died: c. 6 April 2005 (aged 27)
- Body discovered: Limefield Woods, Biggar, South Lanarkshire, Scotland

Emma Caldwell was murdered in April 2005 by serial rapist and sex offender Iain Packer. The investigation of her murder was one of Scotland's longest-running cases, with nineteen years between her death and Packer's imprisonment in 2024 for a minimum term of 36 years. Angela Constance MSP, the Scottish Cabinet Secretary for Justice and Home Affairs, announced that there would be an independent public inquiry into the police handling of the investigation.

== Early life and background ==
Emma Caldwell was born on 31 January 1978 around Cardross, Argyll and Bute, Scotland. Described as having had a "very happy childhood", Caldwell had a keen interest in horses and became a horse riding teacher in her early 20s. When her older sister died of cancer in 1998, it sent Caldwell into a deep depression. A partner encouraged her to try heroin to cope with her grief, and by 2002 she had moved in with him in the Govan area of Glasgow. Caldwell's parents said that they were left in a "blind panic" when they realised that she was addicted to heroin as they did not know what to do.

Her parents attempted to support her, and visited her at a hostel she was now staying in the Govanhill region of Glasgow. They saw her weekly and helped her by doing her washing, buying her food, and giving her credit for her phone bill. Caldwell often returned to have Sunday dinners at her family home, now in Erskine in Renfrewshire. Her parents said they were 'naive' about the cost of her heroin addiction, and did not initially realise that she had turned to prostitution to fund her drug addiction. Emma's parents were overjoyed when they heard of her plan to seek rehabilitation.

== Disappearance and discovery of body ==
Caldwell's family grew concerned when they could not reach her on 6 April after arranging to meet. They then spent weeks searching for her around Glasgow. On 8 May 2005 her body was found at Limefield Woods, around 8 miles south west of Biggar, South Lanarkshire, by a dog walker. His dog had remained steadfast when called and when the walker went to retrieve his dog he realised that she was standing directly beside a dead body, face down in a ditch. In a state of shock he called one of his family members who said in a recorded 999 call that she was in "the middle of nowhere" and could see that the body was unclothed with a garotte around the neck.

A pathologist who examined Caldwell's body after it was discovered confirmed the "clearly identifiable" cause of death was compression of the neck. Her report stated "the pattern of injury is more in keeping with manual strangulation, but the application of a ligature – either instead of, or in addition to a hand – could not be excluded." This could have been the plastic cord or line visible at the back of Caldwell's neck when she was found. The delayed discovery complicated forensic efforts, hindering DNA recovery. Caldwell's mobile phone, her clothing, and her personal belongings, were never recovered. The case was featured on BBC Crimewatch on 15 June 2005. Police reported new leads as a result

== Investigations and suspects ==
Strathclyde Police performed DNA testing on items found on Caldwell's body, but no DNA traces were found. There were traces found on swabs of Caldwell's personal areas, however these were not enough to identify an individual. Tests were also carried out on three used condoms found near Limefield Woods, as well as cigarette ends, and condom wrappers, but they did not match the DNA of any suspects or Caldwell. Glasgow had seen seven women who had engaged in prostitution murdered between 1991 and 2005, but only two of these cases had been solved, with accusations that Strathclyde Police had not done enough to investigate.

The first major lead came when Caldwell's phone history was investigated, with her last contact being with a previously unknown Turkish man. This led to an investigation in which four Turkish men were arrested. They were alleged to have strangled Caldwell at a Turkish café in Glasgow before dumping her body in the woods. The investigation became the most expensive in Strathclyde Police's history (totalling £4 million), with extensive audio and visual surveillance of the men. The men were said to have been regular users of prostitutes, and were said to have brought prostitutes to their cafe where they also drank, gambled, and used drugs. Further evidence emerged when a search found a speck of blood identified as being from Caldwell, and one of the last 'pings' on her mobile phone was linked to a location near the cafe. Officers also searched the home of a barber who was an amateur musician who played at the cafe at times, where they found a cable that the police believed was almost identical to that found on Caldwell's body. One of the men was later arrested and convicted of rape and sexual assaults of other women, some from this investigation.

A police officer of Turkish origin, translating the tapes, claimed there was evidence the men had discussed the murder of Caldwell. But the case against the men collapsed when two specialists who reviewed the tapes said there was no evidence that indicated they had discussed killing Caldwell. One of the men then sued the newly formed Police Scotland (which had merged all of Scotland's police forces into one) for £100,000 where he settled out of court for damages for wrongful arrest and 80 days on remand. A detective working on the case said that the investigation had been a "colossal waste of money" and he believed that the investigation continued because senior officials in Strathclyde police wanted a conviction due to the record sums spent on the investigation. Another former detective said that because the operation against the Turkish men was so big and at such an advanced stage it blinded officers from looking at more realistic suspects.

== Iain Packer ==
In April 2015, the Sunday Mail newspaper published an article naming Iain Packer as a person who had been questioned by the police just weeks after Caldwell's body was found in 2005. (A police investigation into identifying the sources of the article would later be deemed unlawful.) He was identified by other prostitutes as a regular user who was infatuated with Caldwell and changed his story with police numerous times. These women said he had taken them to woods in South Lanarkshire near where Caldwell's body was discovered. Women working in the sex industry had complained about Packer in 2005, putting him in a 'Beware Book', which collected warnings from prostitutes about potentially dangerous clients. Numerous women identified Packer and complained about rapes that had been perpetrated on them by Packer, and by other clients. These women felt their concerns had been ignored by the police because they were prostitutes.

Packer was described as a Jekyll and Hyde character. One woman said he usually treated her "like a lady" but on one occasion he became angry when she refused to remove all of her clothes when she was outside. He then apologised to this woman for leaving her "scared". Packer was found to have admitted to the police that he had taken prostitutes to woods in South Lanarkshire, but he was ruled out of the initial investigation. The specific reason for this is currently unknown.

In 2018, Packer was interviewed by journalist Samantha Poling for a documentary on the BBC programme Disclosure. Packer denied killing Caldwell and said that he had never been violent towards women. Within days of the documentary being broadcast, one of his former partners went to the police to complain that Packer had pushed her onto a bed, put his hands around her throat, choked her to her injury, and to danger of life. Packer later admitted the charge, as well as a charge of stalking and breaching a court order preventing him from contacting the victim. He was convicted and sentenced to jail for two years.

== Arrest and trial ==
On 25 February 2022 Packer was arrested for Caldwell's murder, 17 years after her death. He initially faced 45 other charges against 27 other women, three men, and one boy. 11 of the charges were of rape. The trial against Packer began in January 2024, with him pleading not guilty to 36 charges of physical and sexual violence against multiple women. During the trial Packer admitted that he had previously continued having sex with Caldwell when she asked him to stop. Packer admitted that when asked by Samantha Poling in the Disclosure documentary if he had raped Caldwell, he had not been honest when he denied this. He said that he had denied raping Caldwell as Poling had "set him up". He stated that this behaviour made him feel ashamed. However, he maintained that encounters with Caldwell were largely consensual and that he did not kill her. During further evidence, he also admitted that he had lied to police when he said that he didn't know Caldwell during the initial investigation and said that he visited the general area where Caldwell's body was found, with her, a "maximum" of six times.

Further evidence was provided that linked Packer with the location where Caldwell's body was found. Soil samples from around the ditch where Caldwell's body was discovered were compared to soil samples previously taken from the footwell of a van used by Packer. The court heard the "chosen technique" to compare soil samples was to analyse the pollen in them. The forest samples and the van samples each contained the same types and quantities of pollen. The court heard there was 99% to 99.99% chance they matched at least three of the six soil samples. During the trial the jurors, court staff, and the judge Lord Beckett, as well as Packer, were all driven to the alleged scene of the crime, at Limefield Woods some 41 miles (66 km) from Glasgow High Court.

The closing statement by the defence counsel asked the jury to examine the evidence alone and "not rumour, not gossip, not innuendo. When the advocate depute suggests all the women can't be wrong, that doesn't mean they were all right." The advocate depute for the prosecution said in his closing statement there was "overwhelming" circumstantial evidence to convict Packer. The advocate depute listed 17 circumstances which he said proved Packer murdered Ms Caldwell in April 2005. He said "the most compelling of all was the place where her body was found, there is nothing to suggest that anyone other than Packer had a predilection for strangling sex workers in Limefield Woods. There are 16 sex workers who have accused Packer of being violent towards them. A further 11 women have accused him of grabbing their throats and trying to throttle them. He finished by saying that the prosecution believed that the strangulation and the murder of Caldwell was the most horrifying chapter in what the evidence tells us was Packer's appalling course of sexual violence towards women that lasted over a period of two decades."

On 28 February 2024, Packer was found guilty of the murder of Caldwell, and of 32 other charges against 22 women. Three charges were found not proven. Packer was sentenced to a minimum term of 36 years in prison before he would be able to apply for parole, the second longest sentence in Scottish legal history after Angus Sinclair.

== Aftermath ==
The mother of Caldwell said she had been "betrayed," by the original police investigation, and was "angry," it had taken so long for Packer to be brought to justice. Aamer Anwar, the lawyer representing Caldwell, called for a public inquiry in response to this and said officers who worked on the original investigation must answer for their conduct as Packer went on to attack numerous other women. He further stated that "this is the most prolific sex offender in the history of Scotland and one of the most prolific sex offenders in the history of the United Kingdom."

Scottish First Minister Humza Yousaf MSP said his government was "seriously considering" the option of an inquiry. He said that Justice Secretary Angela Constance MSP, was going to meet with Caldwell's mother and that he would meet with her "as soon as possible." This was in response to Scottish Conservative leader Douglas Ross MSP who said there needed to be a "free and fearless inquiry to get to the bottom of the situation that let killer Iain Packer remain free for 19 years." Scottish Labour leader Anas Sarwar MSP called for this investigation to be led by someone "separate to and independent from Scotland's justice system". Sarwar said the case was one in a long line of 'failures' within Scottish institutions, "which too often fight for their reputations rather than be on the side of victims and seek to find the truth."

A spokesperson from Police Scotland apologised for the way that Strathclyde Police handled the case. They said "Caldwell, her family, and many other victims were let down by policing in 2005, for that, we are sorry. A significant number of women and girls who showed remarkable courage to speak up at that time, did not get the justice and support they needed and deserved from Strathclyde Police. We have reflected and learnt from the initial investigation and subsequent re-investigation, significant changes have been made to our organisational culture, response, victim care, and processes for these types of crimes."

On 5 March 2024 Caldwell's mother met with Humza Yousaf and appealed for a public inquiry into the handling of her daughter's case. The following day Angela Constance announced that there would be an independent public inquiry into the police handling of the investigation. The family of Caldwell stated a desire to have a judge from outside Scotland lead the investigation. Their lawyer commented "the scale of the crimes and the failures are so catastrophic that only an independent judge outside of the Scottish justice system would suffice." The family are to meet with new Scottish First Minister John Swinney, and Justice Secretary Angela Constance, to discuss plans for the inquiry, which has not yet commenced. On 24 April 2025, it was announced that Lord Scott, a Senator of the College of Justice, would chair the public inquiry.

After the inquiry was announced, one of Packer's victims, and an acquaintance of Caldwell said that she believed several of Caldwell's clients were police officers. She accused police of not investigating Packer for his crimes over fears he would reveal that serving officers were using prostitutes.

On 6 March 2024, Packer announced he would appeal against his conviction and the length of his sentence. At the Court of Criminal Appeal, lawyers for Packer, who appeared via video link from prison, argued that the 36-year term was excessive. On 28 August 2024, Lady Dorrian, Lord Matthews and Lady Wise unanimously rejected his appeal against his sentence.
