= August Holiday =

Public holiday in Ireland

- Also called: August Bank Holiday
- Observed by: Ireland
- Date: First Monday in August
- 2025 date: August 4
- 2026 date: August 3
- 2027 date: August 2
- 2028 date: August 7
- Frequency: Annual
- First time: 1871

The August Holiday (Irish: Lá Saoire i mí Lúnasa), also called the August Bank Holiday, is observed in Ireland on the first Monday of August. It was first observed in 1871, when it was created by the UK Act of Parliament, the Bank Holidays Act 1871.

== See also ==
- Bank holiday
- Lughnasadh
