= Fife Airport =

Airport in Fife, Scotland

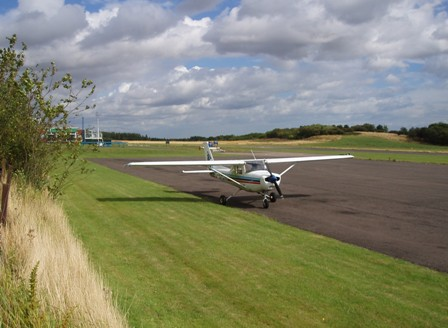
- IATA: none; ICAO: EGPJ

Summary
- Airport type: Public
- Owner: Fife Airport Ltd
- Operator: Flightplan Aviation Ltd
- Serves: Fife
- Location: Glenrothes, Scotland, UK
- Elevation AMSL: 399 ft / 122 m
- Coordinates: 56°11′00″N 003°13′13″W
- Website: www.fifeairport.com

Map
- Location in Fife

Runways
Direction	Length		Surface
Direction	m	ft	Surface
06/24	700	2,297	Asphalt
- Sources: Fife Airport

Fife Airport (ICAO: EGPJ) is an unlicensed aerodrome located 2 nautical miles (3.7 km; 2.3 mi) west of Glenrothes, Fife, Scotland. The airport is owned by Fife Airport Ltd and operated by Flightplan Aviation Ltd. It also serves as an important reliever airport for Edinburgh airport. In 1998, it was voted the best airfield in the United Kingdom by Flyer magazine.

The airfield is used by Edinburgh and Fife Aero Club, Skydive St Andrews, Skyhook Helicopters and Kingdom Helicopters. The airfield was also used by Tayside Aviation until the company's demise in April 2023.

In February 2021, Tayside Aviation took over the leasehold of Fife Airport under their subsidiary Fly with the Best Ltd (later renamed to Flightplan Aviation Ltd) and embarked on a major refurbishment of the airfield and its facilities. The former Tipsy Nipper restaurant was closed in late 2020 and re-opened as the Skyview café.

AVGAS 100LL is available to resident aircraft 24/7 via a self-service pump. Visitors can purchase fuel during operational hours.
