= Murder of Claire Leveque =

2024 murder in Scotland

- Location: Sandness, Shetland, Scotland
- Date: 11 February 2024
- Attack type: Murder
- Deaths: 1
- Victims: Claire Leveque, aged 24
- Perpetrator: Aren Pearson
- Verdict: Guilty
- Convictions: Murder; assault

Claire Leveque was a 24-year-old Canadian woman from Alberta, who was murdered by her boyfriend, Aren Pearson, in Sandness, Shetland, Scotland, on 11 February 2024. Leveque had moved from Canada to Shetland with Pearson in October 2023. She was killed at the home of Pearson's mother following a period of domestic abuse and coercive control.

Leveque suffered at least 26 stab wounds as well as blunt-force injuries, compression of the neck and submersion in a hot tub. Pearson initially admitted killing her during an emergency telephone call and in statements to police and medical personnel, but later denied responsibility and claimed at trial that Leveque had inflicted the injuries upon herself.

Following an eight-day trial at the High Court of Justiciary in Edinburgh, Pearson was unanimously found guilty of murder on 15 October 2025. He was sentenced to life imprisonment with a minimum term of 25 years before becoming eligible to apply for parole. He was also convicted of assaulting Leveque during their relationship.

The case later became the subject of the two-part Channel 5 documentary Trial By Jury: The Killing of Claire Leveque, also distributed internationally under the title Murder in Shetland: Trial by Jury. The programme, which included footage filmed inside the High Court during Pearson's trial, was broadcast in April 2026.

== Background ==
Claire Leveque grew up in Westlock, Alberta, a rural community approximately 90 kilometres north of Edmonton.

Leveque was the daughter of Clint and Kathy Leveque and had a younger brother, William. Her mother died from cancer in 2019. According to accounts given by her family following her death, Leveque had a close relationship with her father and brother. She grew up around animals and was a keen horse rider. Before moving to Scotland, she had worked for approximately five years at Starbucks in Canada.

Leveque travelled to Shetland in October 2023 with her boyfriend, Aren Pearson, a Canadian man with family connections to the islands. The couple stayed with Pearson's mother at a property in Sandness, a remote settlement approximately 30 miles from Lerwick.

At Pearson's later sentencing, Lord Arthurson noted that Leveque did not have permission to work in the United Kingdom, did not have a driving licence and was living thousands of miles away from her family. The court described her circumstances in Sandness as isolated and vulnerable.

== Domestic abuse ==
Evidence presented during Pearson's trial established that Leveque was subjected to physical violence and coercive and controlling behaviour during the months she lived in Shetland. The court heard that Pearson assaulted Leveque on multiple occasions after her arrival in October 2023. She had spoken about the assaults to a neighbour in Shetland and to a cousin in Canada. One assault occurred around Leveque's 24th birthday. During the trial, the jury heard an audio recording of an argument between the couple from December 2023 in which Leveque discussed Pearson having assaulted her and told him that she believed he was going to kill her.

The murder was subsequently treated as having been committed in the context of domestic abuse under the Abusive Behaviour and Sexual Harm (Scotland) Act 2016.

== Murder ==
On the afternoon of 11 February 2024, Leveque and Pearson were at the Sandness property where they were staying with Pearson's mother.

Leveque was attacked in a garage attached to the property. Forensic evidence subsequently showed that she had sustained at least 26 stab wounds in addition to blunt-force injuries. She was also subjected to compression of the neck and was submerged in a hot tub. At approximately 4:55 pm, Pearson's mother called the emergency services. During the call, Pearson admitted that he had killed his girlfriend and described stabbing her repeatedly. Before police arrived, Pearson left the property and drove his car into the sea at nearby Melby Pier. He subsequently returned to the house. Emergency services attended the property, where Leveque was discovered in the hot tub. She was pronounced dead at the scene.

Pearson was arrested and later charged with murder.

== Investigation and criminal proceedings ==
=== Initial court proceedings ===
On 15 February 2024, Pearson appeared at Lerwick Sheriff Court charged with murdering Leveque. He made no plea and was remanded in custody. The case was subsequently transferred to the High Court of Justiciary. In December 2024, it was confirmed that Pearson would stand trial on a charge alleging that he had repeatedly struck Leveque with a knife, inflicted blunt-force trauma, compressed her neck and submerged her in water.

=== Trial ===
Pearson's trial took place at the High Court in Edinburgh in October 2025 and lasted eight days. The prosecution presented forensic evidence, recordings and witness testimony concerning both Leveque's death and Pearson's treatment of her during their relationship.

Jurors heard the recording of Pearson's emergency call in which he said that he had killed Leveque. The court also heard that he made admissions to police officers and medical staff following her death. Pearson denied murder when giving evidence. He claimed that Leveque had become angry during an argument and had stabbed herself after entering the hot tub. A forensic pathologist rejected the suggestion that Leveque could have inflicted the injuries herself. The post-mortem examination recorded dozens of injuries, including at least 26 defined stab wounds and injuries consistent with attempts by Leveque to defend herself.

On 15 October 2025, the jury unanimously found Pearson guilty of murdering Leveque. He was also convicted of assaulting her during the months preceding the murder.

=== Sentencing ===
Lord Arthurson sentenced Pearson to life imprisonment and ordered that he serve a minimum of 25 years before being eligible to apply for parole. The judge described the killing as involving sustained and extreme violence and rejected Pearson's account of Leveque's death. He also criticised Pearson's attempts during the trial to blame and denigrate Leveque. The domestic-abuse aggravation attached to the murder conviction was taken into account when the sentence was calculated. Pearson was separately sentenced to two years' imprisonment for assault, to run concurrently with the life sentence.

== Appeal proceedings ==
Following his conviction, Pearson notified the Scottish Courts and Tribunals Service of an intention to appeal against both his conviction and sentence. He was required to lodge a full note of appeal by 24 December 2025. In January 2026, the Scottish Courts and Tribunals Service confirmed that no full appeal had been submitted by the deadline.

== Reaction ==
Leveque's death received media coverage in both the United Kingdom and Canada. Her father, Clint Leveque, spoke publicly following her death and said that his daughter had been a friendly and sociable person who valued being happy and spending time with people she cared about.

The case also had an impact on the small Shetland community. Following Pearson's conviction, Police Scotland's Shetland area commander described murders of this nature as extremely rare on the islands and referred to the force's work addressing violence against women and girls.

== In popular culture ==
In 2026, the case was the subject of Trial by Jury: The Killing of Claire Leveque, a two-part documentary produced by Big Little Fish for Channel 5 and distributed internationally by Sphere Abacus under the title Murder in Shetland: Trial by Jury.

The documentary was directed by John Holdsworth and followed Pearson's eight-day trial. Production was granted access to film proceedings inside the High Court in Edinburgh, alongside interviews with Leveque's family and archive material covering her life and final months in Shetland. The two episodes were broadcast on Channel 5 on 27 and 28 April 2026.

== See also ==
- Domestic violence in the United Kingdom
- Violence against women
- Femicide
- Shetland
