= BBC Scotland Investigates =

- Created by: BBC Scotland

Production
- Producer: BBC Scotland
- Running time: 30 minutes

Original release
- Network: BBC One Scotland
- Release: 10 November 1994 – 14 July 2018

BBC Scotland Investigates was a current affairs programme broadcast in Scotland by BBC Scotland.

Originally known as Frontline Scotland, the programme typically featured current issues affecting the Scottish people. Notable examples include gang warfare in Glasgow, problems with the NHS, the likely effects of increased gambling in Scottish cities and North Sea oil.

No new episodes of BBC Scotland Investigates’ have been broadcast since 2018. The BBC’s current investigation series is known as BBC Disclosure, with similar journalists like Samantha Poling.

In most cases, the entire programme is devoted to one topic, and consists entirely of an in-depth documentary piece from a single reporter (similar to the BBC's Panorama programme).

== See also ==
- Television in Scotland
