= Castle Douglas High School =

School in Kirkcudbrightshire, Scotland

Coordinates: 54.949°N 3.928°W

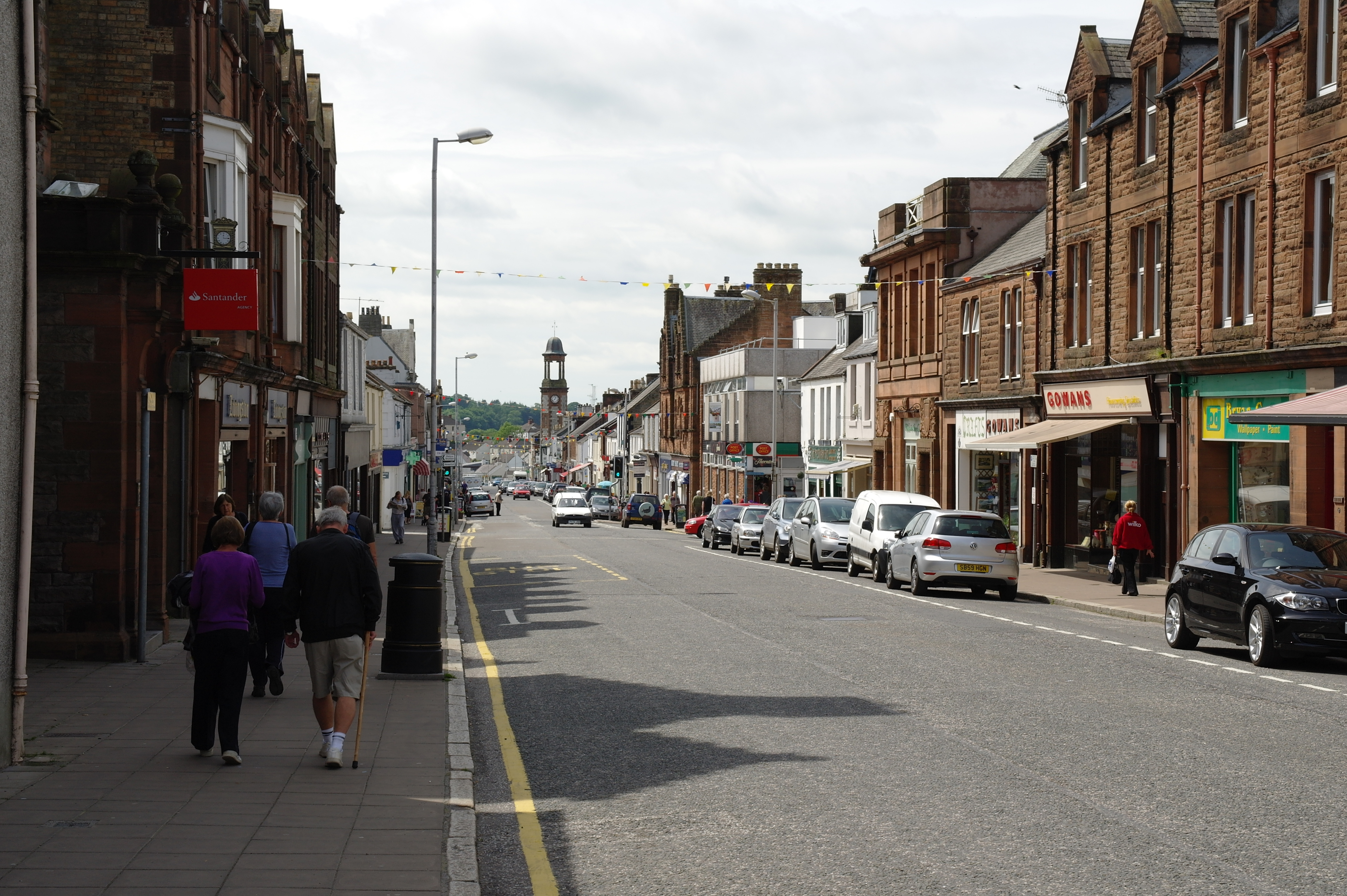
Castle Douglas High School is in the town of Castle Douglas

Castle Douglas High School is a comprehensive state school situated in Castle Douglas in the historical county of Kirkcudbrightshire. It has approximately 550 students and provides education from Secondary 1 to Secondary 6. Castle Douglas High School is run in conjunction with Dalry Secondary School by the same management team.
