= Adamson Hospital =

- NHS Fife
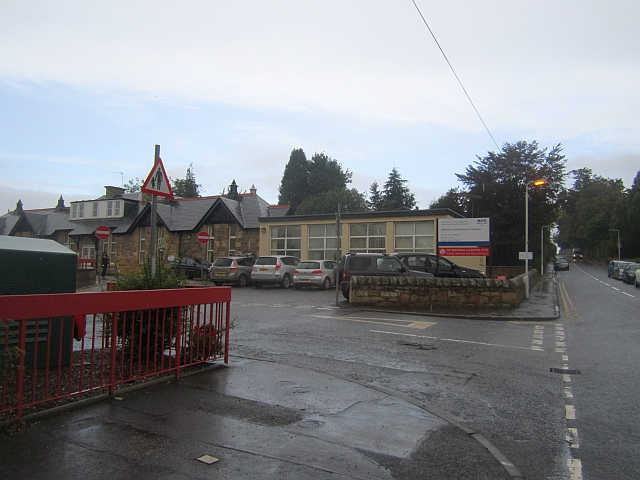
- Adamson Hospital

- Shown in Fife

Geography
- Location: Cupar, Fife, Scotland
- Coordinates: 56.3241°N 3.0171°W

Organisation
- Care system: NHS Scotland
- Type: Community hospital

Services
- Emergency department: Minor Injuries Unit

History
- Founded: 1904

Links
- Website: www.nhsfife.org/adamson/
- Lists: Hospitals in Scotland

Adamson Hospital is a small community hospital in Cupar, Fife which was established in 1904. It was expanded in the 1930s and again in the 1970s when a health centre and two GP practices were added. A redevelopment project began in 2009 which further expanded the hospital and was finished in 2012. It is managed by NHS Fife.

== History ==
Adamson Hospital was named after Alexander Adamson who, on in his death in 1866, donated money for the founding of either a school or a hospital. This hospital was originally built in 1873 in the village of Ceres, just outside of Cupar but the location was found to be unsuitable.

Design plans for a new Adamson Hospital were put forward by three local architects: David Storrar, Henry Allan Newman and Henry Bruce, with Newman's design being chosen. Construction began in 1903 and the building was opened in 1904.

The hospital was first extended in 1930 with the addition of x-ray and sterilisation departments and in 1935, a further extension was added to the west side of the building and a nurses home was built.

A £9.8 million redevelopment project began in 2009. The kitchen, linen room, palliative care unit and link corridors were all demolished and a new two-storey entrance built on the ground which includes the reception on the ground floor and the children's outpatient department on the first floor. While the redevelopment was going on, the GP practices, outpatients and minor injuries department stayed open at Adamson while many of the community clinics moved to Stratheden Hospital in Springfield, Fife and x-ray services were moved to Glenrothes Hospital and St Andrews Community Hospital. The redevelopment was opened on 29 October 2012 by Alex Neil, the Cabinet Secretary for Health and Wellbeing.
