= BBC Scotland Sports Personality of the Year =

Scottish sports award (1977–2007)

- Country: Scotland
- Presented by: BBC Scotland
- Formerly called: Sportscene Personality of the Year
- First award: 1977; 49 years ago
- Final award: 2007; 19 years ago
- Related: BBC Sports Personality of the Year

The BBC Scotland Sports Personality of the Year (also known as Sportscene Personality of the Year until 1998) was an annual sport award in Scotland. It was organised by BBC Scotland.

== History ==
Between 1984 and 1996 it had its own show similar to the BBC Sports Personality of the Year with postal votes, a live audience and hosted by Dougie Donnelly, Archie Macpherson (until 1989), Hazel Irvine (from 1990) and Rob MacLean and for most years, it was often shown a week before the network version in December. The trophy was made by Caithness Glass with a diamond shape design. In 1997 and in 1998, it was decided by a public telephone vote with the winner being given the award on the usual Sportscene programme on Saturday nights.

== Winners ==
Year	Name	Sport	Note
1977	Kenny Dalglish	Footballer	
1978	Kenny Dalglish	Footballer	
1979	Unknown		
1980	Allan Wells	Athlete	
1981–1983	Unknown		
1984	Robert Millar	Cyclist	
1985	Sandy Lyle	Golfer	
1986	Tom McKean	Athlete	
1987	Ally McCoist	Footballer	
1988	Liz McColgan	Athlete	
1989	Stephen Hendry	Snooker player	
1990	David Sole	Rugby player	
1991	Liz McColgan	Athlete	
1992	Ally McCoist	Footballer	
1993	Graeme Obree	Cyclist	
1994	Yvonne Murray	Athlete	
1995	Gavin Hastings	Rugby player	
1996	Stephen Hendry	Snooker player	
1997	Walter Smith	Football manager	
1998	Henrik Larsson	Footballer	
1999–2002	Unknown		
2003	Chris Hoy	Cyclist	
2004	Jim Anderson	Swimmer	
2005	Andy Murray	Tennis player	
2006	Unknown		
2007	Dario Franchitti	Racing driver	

=== Other awards ===
A 1986 team award went to badminton players Dan Travers and Billy Gilliland. and in 1988, the award was given to the Scottish members of the British Paralympic team

== See also ==
- Sport in Scotland
- BBC Sports Personality of the Year
