= St Andrews Community Hospital =

Hospital in St Andrews, Fife, Scotland

- NHS Fife
- Shown in Fife

Geography
- Location: St Andrews, Fife, Scotland
- Coordinates: 56.328519°N 2.803681°W

Organisation
- Care system: NHS Fife
- Type: Community hospital

Services
- Emergency department: Minor Injuries Unit only
- Beds: 40

History
- Founded: September 2009

Links
- Website: www.nhsfife.org/services/hospitals-and-wards/hospitals/st-andrews-community-hospital/
- Other links: List of hospitals in Scotland

St Andrews Community Hospital is a small hospital to the south of the university town of St Andrews in Fife, Scotland. The hospital serves the town of St Andrews and surrounding villages in North East Fife and is managed by NHS Fife.

== History ==
The hospital was commissioned to accommodate centrally all services that were previously hosted at three different locations: St Andrews Memorial Hospital on Abbey Walk, the St Andrews Health Centre on Pipeland Road, and the NHS Dental Surgery on North Street. It was opened in September 2009.

== Services ==
The 10,800-square-metre (116,000 sq ft) complex hosts the town's two General Medical Practices, a pharmacy, and a range of inpatient and outpatient health services. A Minor Injuries Unit handles lesser accidents such as lacerations and fractures; full Accident and Emergency services are available at nearby Ninewells Hospital in Dundee, and Victoria Hospital in Kirkcaldy. It was constructed to provide 40 beds.

== Transport ==
The hospital is well linked to St Andrews Bus Station and the town centre by regular public bus services provided by Stagecoach in Fife and Moffat & Williamson. Service no. 64 goes directly to Stratheden Hospital in Cupar, and service no. 99 goes to Leuchars railway station and to Dundee bus station, from where connections to Ninewells Hospital are available. Service no. 95 connects the hospital to rural communities in the East Neuk of Fife.
