= Archie Macpherson =

Scottish football commentator

- Born: Archibald Macpherson; Shettleston, Glasgow, Scotland
- Known for: Sports commentary, authorship

Archibald Macpherson is a Scottish football commentator and author. He has been commentating on Scottish football, on radio and television, for over four decades.

== Early life ==
Macpherson was born and raised in the Shettleston area of Glasgow. His father had played as a centre forward for Shettleston, Dalry Thistle and Largs Thistle. He achieved a BA in Education and was a teacher in North Lanarkshire in the late 1950s, later becoming a headmaster.

== Broadcasting career ==
Macpherson has worked for the BBC, STV, Eurosport, Setanta Sports, Radio Clyde and Talksport, although he initially struggled to gain a foothold in broadcasting. His first job was as a teacher where he supplemented his income by getting short stories published in local newspapers under a pseudonym "Alan Marshal". Such efforts paid off and helped him gain his initial big break at the BBC. He continued to work as a headmaster until 1969 when he joined the BBC on a full-time basis and remained with the corporation until 1990.

He was also a regular figure of the BBC TV network's sport coverage. He appeared on Grandstand to round up the Scottish football league results and presented some sports bulletins for Breakfast Time when Bob Wilson or David Icke were unavailable. He also occasionally commentated on matches in England for the network, especially when the television rights to the Scottish Cup belonged to Scottish Television in 1988–90.

His popularity saw him elected as Rector of the University of Edinburgh in 1985, defeating Teddy Taylor, Margo MacDonald and Richard Demarco.

In the 1996 film adaptation of Irvine Welsh's cult novel Trainspotting Macpherson re-voiced his commentary of Archie Gemmill's famous goal for Scotland against the Netherlands at the 1978 World Cup as a sex scene unfolded at the same time, both pieces of action climaxing simultaneously. Archie was originally unaware of how his voice was used, although he later acknowledged that it helped to bolster his reputation, as the movie grossed over $72 million dollars worldwide..

Macpherson was recognised at the 2005 Scottish BAFTA ceremony, gaining a prize for a "Special Contribution to Scottish Broadcasting".

His last regular role was commentating on STV's coverage of UEFA Champions League and UEFA Cup matches involving Scottish teams. Macpherson also regularly appeared on STV's Scotsport, which aired highlights from the Scottish Premier League (SPL) on Monday nights during the football season, until its cancellation in 2008.

Macpherson made a special guest appearance to mark the fiftieth anniversary of BBC Scotland's football highlights programme Sportscene on 9 August 2025. Fellow veteran broadcasters Dougie Donnelly, Jock Brown and Rob MacLean also appeared on the show with Macpherson providing commentary on the match between St. Mirren and Motherwell. The game was shown first in the running order in honour of Macpherson's appearance, but disappointingly finished in a 0–0 draw.

== Writing ==
Macpherson has written a best-selling biography of Scottish football manager Jock Stein, and Flower of Scotland?, about his own trials and tribulations whilst following Scottish football for the past four decades. A Game of Two Halves: The Autobiography followed in 2009, and in 2014, he turned to fiction with the adventure novel Silent Thunder.

In 2020, Macpherson's book More Than A Game: Living with the Old Firm was published by Luath Press.

Two years later, Macpherson published his latest book on sport: Touching the Heights: Personal Portraits of Scottish Sporting Greats, which was shortlisted for the Sunday Times Sports Book of the Year 2022.

== Nicknames and alleged age ==
He has been colloquially referred to as "woof", as he had allegedly said it in the commentary of one of his games. However, Archie later confirmed he never actually said it, and that it was misattributed to him. Additionally, there has been a minor controversy in biographies regarding his age, as he had " been everything from 83 to 87 in the newspapers, for years now". He claimed to turn 90 in November of 2024 in an interview with the Scottish Sun, which is considered accurate.

== Political views ==
During the 2014 Scottish independence referendum, Macpherson campaigned across Scotland and argued for Scotland remaining in the United Kingdom, stating "Scottish values are British values too." He later told the Daily Record “It was straight from the heart, that’s for sure. It came from a sense of anger and impotence, a sense of letting this Union slip away from us without doing anything,”

== Works ==
- Jock Stein: The Definitive Biography
- Flower of Scotland?
- Action Replays 1991
- A Game of Two Halves: The Autobiography, 2009
- Silent Thunder, 2014
- More Than A Game: Living with the Old Firm, Luath Press, 2020, ISBN 9781913025748
- Touching the Heights: Personal Portraits of Scottish Sporting Greats, Luath Press, 2022.

Academic offices
Preceded by David Steel	Rector of the University of Edinburgh; 1985–1988	Succeeded by Muriel Gray
