= Jock Adie =

Scottish footballer (1930–2023)

Personal information
- Date of birth: 2 March 1930
- Place of birth: Windygates, Scotland
- Date of death: 12 February 2023 (aged 92)
- Place of death: Windygates, Scotland
- Position: Left-back

Youth career
- Windygates Juveniles

Senior career*
Years	Team	Apps	(Gls)
1948–1955	Heart of Midlothian	56	(0)
1955–1958	East Fife	41	(0)
1958–1959	Dundee United	5	(0)
- * Club domestic league appearances and goals

John "Jock" Adie (2 March 1930 – 12 February 2023) was a Scottish footballer who played as a left-back. Adie began his career in the late 1940s with Heart of Midlothian, spending seven years with the Tynecastle side before moving back to Fife with East Fife. The defender spent three years at Bayview Park before having a short spell in 1958 with Dundee United, making his debut in August of that year. A couple of months later, Adie lost his first-team place and appears to have been released shortly after. Adie died after a long illness at Cameron Hospital, Windygates, on 12 February 2023, aged 92.
