= Jonathan Sutherland =

Scottish television presenter (born 1977)

- Born: Jonathan Sutherland; 23 May 1977 (age 49); Brae, Shetland, Scotland
- Presenting career
- Show: Sportscene
- Style: Sports presenter
- Country: Scotland
- Previous show: Reporting Scotland

Jonathan Sutherland (born 1977) is a Scottish television and radio presenter and producer, currently the main presenter of BBC Scotland's Sunday night Sportscene on BBC One Scotland, and regularly appears on Reporting Scotland.

== Education ==
Sutherland was born in Brae in the Shetland Islands. He left the islands to study politics at Aberdeen University and subsequently graduated with his degree in 1999 before landing a job at BBC Radio Shetland.

== Early career ==
His first taste of journalism was with Radio Shetland, but he left in 2003 to build his career. He was hired by BBC Sport as a broadcast journalist but left the BBC briefly for a spell to take up the role of deputy editor at the Shetland Weekly newspaper. He returned to the BBC soon after to work on various productions as a freelancer before landing the job of assistant producer of Sportscene.

== Presenting career ==
Jonathan is the main presenter of the Sunday night SPFL highlights show, Sportscene. He is also a regular presenter of Sportsound on BBC Radio Scotland.

He occasionally hosted the Sportscene Results show on Saturday afternoons until the programme's demise at the start of 2025.

Jonathan is one of two Shetlanders working for BBC Scotland sport, the other being Phil Goodlad, who is from Yell.

== Personal life ==
Jonathan lives in Glasgow with his wife, BBC Alba presenter Siobhan MacInnes.

He has two sons from this relationship, and a son from a previous marriage.
