= Sportscene =

Scottish sports television programmes

- Title card (2026–present)
- Genre: Sport
- Presented by: Jonathan Sutherland; Steven Thompson
- Country of origin: Scotland
- Original language: English

Production
- Production locations: BBC Pacific Quay (Glasgow, Scotland)
- Production companies: BBC Sport Scotland (BBC Sport)

Original release
- Network: BBC One Scotland; BBC Two Scotland (before 2019); BBC Scotland (2019–)
- Release: 9 August 1975 – present

Sportscene is the name of a range of Scottish sports television programmes produced by BBC Scotland. While previously it covered sports across Scotland, its contemporary focus is Scottish league, cup and international football.

== History ==
Sportscene's predecessors were Sports Special from Scotland and Sportsreel, which was broadcast every Saturday at around 5pm (results and reports) and 10pm (highlights) in the 1950s, 1960s and the early 1970s. By the mid-1970s, a Sportscene format of a 5pm programme called Scoreboard presented by Gordon Hewitt (as a regional opt-out from Grandstand), plus a 10pm show with highlights from one English and one Scottish league or cup match, was established. Sportscene also covered European and international matches, which usually involved highlights but occasionally provided live coverage. The show was presented by Archie Macpherson with commentary by Macpherson, Alastair Alexander or Peter Thomson.

== Shows ==
A previous Sportscene set (2008) at BBC Scotland's Pacific Quay HQ.

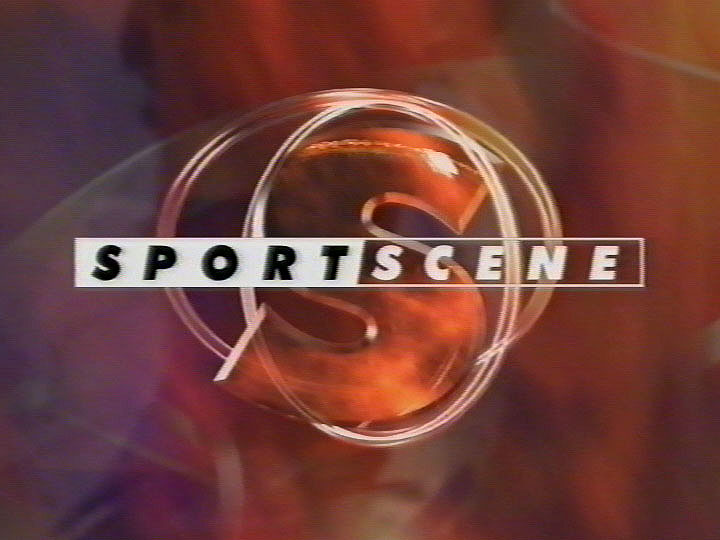
Previous Sportscene titles (1990s)

A number of shows come under the Sportscene brand.

- Sportscene (Note: Also billed as Sportscene: Premiership Highlights) is broadcast on Saturday and Sunday evenings on BBC Scotland, with a late night repeat on BBC One Scotland; and is most often presented by Steven Thompson and Jonathan Sutherland. The show produces highlights of all the week's matches from the Scottish Premiership. The relevant presenter is often joined by two studio guests to discuss the results; guests have included Pat Nevin, Packie Bonner, Steven Naismith, James McFadden, Andy Halliday and Scott Brown. Commentators include Rob Maclean, Liam McLeod, Paul Mitchell, John Barnes and Alasdair Lamont.
- Sportscene Live is the name used for all live football matches broadcast by BBC Scotland. It is mostly presented by Steven Thompson, Jonathan Sutherland and Leanne Crichton on the BBC Scotland channel; some live matches are presented by Rob Maclean on BBC One Scotland. Coverage includes Friday night fixtures in the Scottish Championship, select Scottish Cup games and Scotland international matches.
- Most other football related programming is simply branded as Sportscene. This includes highlights packages and other one-off specials. The main exception is a TV simulcast of the Open All Mics service provided by BBC Radio Scotland's Sportsound, which airs on the BBC Scotland channel on Saturday afternoons.

== Previous shows ==
- Sportscene Results was broadcast on Saturday afternoons on BBC One Scotland and occasionally BBC Scotland (formerly BBC Two Scotland) until January 2025. The programme offered a round-up of the day's main football results, whilst debating the major Scottish football stories of the week. It sent reporters to every game in the Scottish Premiership, certain games in the Scottish Championship, as well as Scottish Cup and Scottish League Cup games. BBC Scotland had historically produced a Saturday teatime results round-up programme as an opt-out from Grandstand, initially known as Scoreboard which launched on 16 August 1975, but in 1989 a new programme called Afternoon Sportscene was launched. It ran for the entire duration of the time allocated for the day's results, starting at some point between 1 and 5 minutes before the network aired English counterpart Final Score. At the start of the 2001/02 season the programme was renamed Sportscene Results to co-inside with the programme, and Final Score, becoming programmes in their own right. Sportscene Results presenters included David Currie, Peter Thomson, Sandy McLeish, Murdoch McPherson, Brian Marjoribanks, Alastair Alexander, Gordon Hewitt, Bill McFarlan, Rob Maclean, Jim Craig, Dougie Donnelly, Hazel Irvine, Alison Walker, Dougie Vipond, Stuart Cosgrove and Eilidh Barbour. The show also gave football experts like Pat Nevin and Tony Higgins an opportunity to give their views on the day's results and the past week of football. The very last edition of Sportscene Results aired on 2 January 2025; its timeslot was taken by a simulcast of BBC Radio Scotland's Open All Mics. This simulcast aired for the remainder of that season, and throughout the following season, but ended at the conclusion of the 2025/26 season, Now, BBC Scotland airs Final Score.
- Sportscene Rugby Special was the title of BBC Scotland's domestic rugby union programming when it held the rights to the Scottish leagues with the live matches & highlights broadcasting on BBC Two Scotland on Sunday teatimes starting on 30 October 1994 until the end of the 1996–97 season also on Sunday lunchtimes for the 1997–98 season for the 1998–99 season it was broadcast on Monday teatimes and for the 1999–2000 season on Sunday nights moving to BBC One Scotland before the 2000–01 season on Saturday nights after Sportscene: Match of the Day although this didn't last long as BBC Scotland lost the broadcasting rights of the Scottish rugby at the end of 2000 to rival Scottish Television which launched Scotsport Rugby Round-Up on 14 January 2001, The last Sportscene Rugby Special programme was on 4 November 2000 (highlights) and 18 November 2000 (live)
- Friday Sportscene was the name of the football preview programme that went out on BBC One Scotland on Friday nights from 11 August 1989 – 25 May 2001 The programme's format was later moved to Saturday lunchtimes in place of Football Focus from 28 July 2001 but has been absent from the schedules since BBC Scotland lost the live rights to the Scottish Premier League in 2004.

== Presenters, commentators and reporters ==
Sportscene's main hosts are David Currie, Steven Thompson and Jonathan Sutherland, with Amy Irons filling in when the latter two are unavailable.

Previous Sportscene presenters include Peter Thomson, Sandy McLeish, Bill Malcolm, Archie Henry, Murdoch McPherson, Glen Gibson, Brian Marjoribanks, Alastair Alexander, Charles Munro, Archie Macpherson, Gordon Hewitt, Andrew Alexander, Dougie Donnelly, Bill McFarlan, Jim Craig, Derek Johnstone, Laura McGhie, Hazel Irvine, Jock Brown, Mark Souster, Alison Walker, Mike Abbott, Richard Gordon, Jill Douglas, Amy Irons, John Beattie, Dougie Vipond, and Stuart Cosgrove.

The programme's main commentary and reporting team consists of lead commentator Liam McLeod, Paul Mitchell, John Barnes, Kheredine Idessane, Al Lamont, Jane Lewis and Chris McLaughlin.

Previous lead commentators include Archie MacPherson (1969–1990), Jock Brown (1990–1997), Rob MacLean (1997–2004) and Paul Mitchell (2004–2010).

Reporters on Sportscene Results have included Jonathan Sutherland, Chris McLaughlin, Brian McLauchlin, Tam McManus, Kenny Crawford, Scott Davie, Martin Dowden, Jim Spence, Charlie Mann and Sandra Brown.

To celebrate the 50th anniversary of Sportscene, former presenters Dougie Donnelly and Gordon Smith, alongside former commentators Archie MacPherson and Jock Brown, returned to cover the three matches that took place on August 9, 2025; exactly 50 years since the programme debuted. MacPherson, now 91, commentated on a scoreless draw between St. Mirren and Motherwell; Brown covered a 3-1 victory for Livingston over Falkirk.

== Online ==
Sportscene opening credits, 2011

Sportscene has begun simulcasting certain live matches via both the BBC Sport website and the BBC Sport mobile app. The 2006-07 UEFA Cup tie between Molde FK and Rangers F.C. was one of the first to feature online. Most programmes now feature on the BBC iPlayer service, depending on rights restrictions.

== In popular culture ==
The programme is regularly parodied in the Scottish football impressionist show Only an Excuse?. Munchtime Sportscene is a name often used by the programme's makers, presumably a play on the currently rested Lunchtime Sportscene programme.

== See also ==
- Sportsound
- Scotsport
- BBC Scotland
- BBC Sport
