= David Begg =

David Begg may refer to:

- David Begg (broadcaster) (born 1946), Scottish football and golf commentator
- David Begg (trade unionist) (born 1950), Irish trade unionist
