= Queen Margaret Hospital =

- NHS Fife
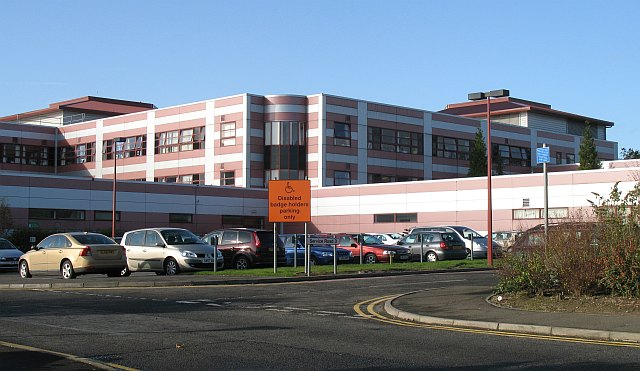
- Queen Margaret Hospital

- Shown in Fife

Geography
- Location: Dunfermline, Fife, Scotland
- Coordinates: 56.0824°N 3.4273°W

Organisation
- Care system: NHS Scotland
- Type: General

Services
- Emergency department: Minor injuries unit only

History
- Founded: Phase I: 1985; Phase II: 1993

Links
- Website: Official website

Queen Margaret Hospital is a hospital located in the city of Dunfermline in Fife, Scotland. It is managed by NHS Fife.

== History ==
The hospital was commissioned to replace the Milesmark Hospital, the Dunfermline and West Fife District Hospital and the Dunfermline Maternity Hospital. The first phase of the new hospital, which excluded maternity services, opened in 1985. The second phase was completed in 1993 and the new facilities were officially opened by the Princess Royal later that year.

From January 2012, all of Fife's accident and emergency services were located at the Victoria Hospital in Kirkcaldy. In 2014 improvements were made to the reception area aimed at making the area more welcoming.

== Services ==
The hospital provides breast surgery, ophthalmology, dermatology and day surgery services.

== Public transport ==
Various Stagecoach East Scotland bus services stop at the hospital. A railway station is within a ten-minute walk of the hospital.

== Radio West Fife ==
Radio West Fife is the current hospital radio service broadcasting to Queen Margaret Hospital.
