= List of listed buildings in Buckhaven And Methil, Fife =

This is a list of listed buildings in the parish of Buckhaven and Methil in Fife, Scotland.

== List ==
Name	Location	Date listed	Grid ref. (Note: Sometimes known as OSGB36, the grid reference (where provided) is based on the British national grid reference system used by the Ordnance Survey. • "Guide to National Grid". Ordnance Survey. • "Get-a-map". Ordnance Survey.)	Geo-coordinates	Notes	LB number (Note: Historic Environment Scotland assign a unique alphanumeric identifier to each designated site in Scotland, for listed buildings this always begins with "LB", for example "LB12345".)	Image
Buckhaven, Church Street, St Andrew's Theatre				56°10′17″N 3°02′08″W	Category B	22711	Upload another image
Denbeath, 1-23 And 25-51 (Odd Nos) Cowley Street				56°10′48″N 3°01′22″W	Category C(S)	46071	Upload Photo
Lower Methil, 313-338 (Inclusive Nos) High Street, St Andrew's Square				56°11′03″N 3°00′42″W	Category C(S)	46074	Upload another image
Methilhill, Holly Bank, Methilhill Cemetery (Nw) With Gravestones				56°11′35″N 3°01′58″W	Category C(S)	46078	Upload Photo
Denbeath, Wellesley Road, Randolph Wemyss Memorial Hospital With Mortuary, Stack, Ancillary Buildings, Boundary Walls And Gatepiers				56°10′38″N 3°01′38″W	Category B	22716	Upload another image
Methil, Wellesley Road And Whyterose Terrace, Tower Bar				56°11′19″N 3°00′31″W	Category C(S)	22714	Upload another image
Methilhill, 1-8 (Inclusive Nos) Wilson Square				56°11′11″N 3°02′14″W	Category B	19129	Upload Photo
Methilhill, Steel Works Brae, Footbridge Over River Leven				56°11′38″N 3°01′20″W	Category C(S)	46082	Upload Photo
Buckhaven, Randolph Street, And Church Street, Royal Bank Buildings Including Boundary Walls And Inset Railings				56°10′15″N 3°02′03″W	Category C(S)	46069	Upload Photo
Methil, Wellesley Road, White Swan Hotel				56°10′50″N 3°01′15″W	Category C(S)	22713	Upload another image
Buckhaven, Victoria Street And Kinnear Street, Community Centre				56°10′15″N 3°02′15″W	Category C(S)	46070	Upload Photo
Methil, School Street, Aberhill Primary School With Ancillary Structures, Boundary Walls, Gatepiers And Gates				56°11′16″N 3°00′42″W	Category B	46076	Upload Photo
Methil, Wellesley Road, War Memorial				56°10′58″N 3°01′06″W	Category C(S)	46077	Upload another image
Lower Methil, 159 High Street, Trinidad With Boundary Walls				56°11′21″N 3°00′16″W	Category C(S)	46073	Upload another image
Denbeath, Institution Street, Denbeath Miners' Welfare Institute And Bowling Club With Boundary Walls, Gatepiers, Gates And Railings				56°10′40″N 3°01′53″W	Category C(S)	46072	Upload Photo
Lower Methil, 240 And 242 High Street, East Dock Bar				56°11′08″N 3°00′32″W	Category C(S)	46075	Upload another image
Methilhill, Methilhaven Road And Methil Brae, St Agatha's Roman Catholic Church				56°11′16″N 3°01′23″W	Category C(S)	46079	Upload another image
Methil, Wellesley Road, Methil Parish Church (Church Of Scotland) With Boundary Walls, Gatepiers And Gates				56°11′02″N 3°01′01″W	Category B	22712	Upload another image
Methilhill, Main Street, Ashgrove House With Ancillary Structure, Boundary Walls And Railings				56°11′10″N 3°02′42″W	Category B	22715	Upload Photo
Buckhaven, Church Street And Randolph Street, Buckhaven Parish Church With Font, Gatepiers, Boundary Walls And Railings				56°10′16″N 3°02′05″W	Category C(S)	46068	Upload another image
Methilhill, Sea Road, Methilhill House With Boundary Walls				56°11′16″N 3°02′08″W	Category B	46080	Upload Photo
Barncraig Street Former Denbeath Parish Church And Hall, Including Boundary Walls, Piers, Gatepiers And Gates				56°10′38″N 3°01′48″W	Category C(S)	50126	Upload another image

== Key ==
The scheme for classifying buildings in Scotland is:

- Category A: "buildings of national or international importance, either architectural or historic; or fine, little-altered examples of some particular period, style or building type."
- Category B: "buildings of regional or more than local importance; or major examples of some particular period, style or building type, which may have been altered."
- Category C: "buildings of local importance; lesser examples of any period, style, or building type, as originally constructed or moderately altered; and simple traditional buildings which group well with other listed buildings."

In March 2016 there were 47,288 listed buildings in Scotland. Of these, 8% were Category A, and 50% were Category B, with the remaining 42% being Category C.

== See also ==
- List of listed buildings in Fife
