= Alison Walker =

British sports broadcaster

Alison Walker is a Scottish sports broadcaster.

Walker took a degree in media and communication studies at the University of Sunderland, followed by a postgraduate diploma in Business and Secretarial Studies.

On graduating, her first job was as a runner for a film production company in Glasgow, eventually becoming their producer of corporate and training videos.

In 1987 she was recruited by Glasgow CableVision as a Production Assistant and within a year was presenting the local news channel. In 1988 she joined BBC Radio Scotland as a reporter/presenter, moving on to produce Sportsound.

Her radio work has been combined with presentation and reporting roles for BBC Scotland television, with regular contributions to Sportscene and Reporting Scotland where she was the main sports presenter from 2003 to 2009.

She was the first female broadcaster in Scotland to report live on football matches. She has also presented programmes on curling, mountain biking, rugby, swimming, field hockey and shinty. She has reported on seven Olympic Games: Sydney in 2000, Beijing in 2008, Vancouver 2010, London 2012, Sochi 2014, Rio 2016 and was a commentator at the Winter Olympics in Pyeongchang. Notable interviewees include Pelé and Tiger Woods and in the Summer of 2014 she compered the athletics at Hampden Park for the Commonwealth Games where she interviewed Usain Bolt. She reported on the first ever Youth Olympics in 2010, where she was the main commentator on the Opening Ceremony and followed that up with the Winter Youth Games in Innsbruck and the second Summer Games in Nanjing.

Walker is now a freelance sports journalist, TV presenter and live event host, working for amongst others, BBC Radio 5 Live, World Curling TV, Rangers TV, Eurosport and the Olympic News Channel.
