= Victoria Radio Network =

Scotland
- Broadcast area: Victoria Hospital

Programming
- Format: Music and Talk

History
- First air date: 3 March 1971

Links
- Website: www.vrnkirkcaldy.com

The Victoria Radio Network (VRN) is a hospital radio station based in Kirkcaldy, Scotland. It currently broadcasts 24 hours a day to the premises of the Victoria Hospital and surrounding facilities to patients' bedside radios and www.vrnkirkcaldy.com

== History ==
VRN was formed in February 1971 by a group of young people in Kirkcaldy. Its first broadcast took place on 3 March, and the studio was originally housed in a cupboard of the main tower block of the hospital.

The station moved to premises on nearby St Clair Street, approximately 1 mile from the hospital. However, when this area was later redeveloped, the station moved back to the hospital site. This time, a custom-built studio was created out of Portakabins. The final move was to an old boiler house on Willow Drive.

In 2002, VRN was awarded a medium wave broadcasting licence. The first AM (medium wave) broadcast took place on 2 February 2002, and the station continued to broadcast on AM till Dec 2017. The station is now available on bed side tablets and on line at www.vrnkirkcaldy.com.

== Membership ==
VRN is run entirely by volunteers, with no full-time members of staff. There are currently around 50 members of the team. The majority of members are presenters, but there are also ward visitors, fundraisers and committee positions.

== Broadcasting Output ==
As a hospital station, output is directed towards patients, staff and visitors. Main programming features include:

- Patient Request Shows every weeknight
- Live commentaries of Raith Rovers Saturday home matches.
- VRN's Book at Bedtime – a selection of audio books
- Getting to Know You – local people are interviewed, and select music to play

When presenters are not in the studio, a series of pre-recorded programmes are played along with music.

== Former members ==
An important function of hospital radio is that it has allows a first step for those looking to work in broadcasting.

Notable former members of VRN include:

- Richard Park – Managing Director of Global Radio
- Arthur Ballingall – (former) Managing Director of Radio Tay
- Jackie Storrar – Country and Western singer and broadcaster
- Scott Davie – BBC Scotland Football Commentator
- Laura Haldane – Scottish News Anchor for ITV's Daybreak

== Awards ==
VRN has received awards, many of which have come from the Hospital Broadcasting Association (HBA). Recent awards include:

=== 2006 ===
- Male Presenter of the Year (HBA): John Murray – bronze award
- Female Presenter of the Year (HBA): Laura Haldane – silver award

=== 2007 ===
- Male Presenter of the Year (HBA): John Murray – gold award
- Best Speech Package (HBA): Interview with Gordon Brown – silver award
- Best Specialised Music (HBA): Blues & Stuff – bronze award
- Station of the Year (HBA) – silver award

=== 2008 ===
- Best Radio Broadcast (Creative Fife): The Treatment Table
- Male Presenter of the Year (HBA): Neil Ingebrigtsen – bronze award

=== 2010 ===
- The John Whitney Award(HBA): John Murray

== Website ==
As a hospital station, VRN streams its output online. A selection of archived material can be listened to.
