= List of listed buildings in Markinch, Fife =

This is a list of listed buildings in the parish of Markinch in Fife, Scotland.

== List ==
Name	Location	Date listed	Grid ref. (Note: Sometimes known as OSGB36, the grid reference (where provided) is based on the British national grid reference system used by the Ordnance Survey. • "Guide to National Grid". Ordnance Survey. • "Get-a-map". Ordnance Survey.)	Geo-coordinates	Notes	LB number (Note: Historic Environment Scotland assign a unique alphanumeric identifier to each designated site in Scotland, for listed buildings this always begins with "LB", for example "LB12345".)	Image
Windygates, Cameron Hospital, Pavilion Wards And Lodges 2 And 3				56°11′14″N 3°03′26″W	Category B	43384	Upload Photo
Carriston With Walled Garden, Bee Boles, Boundary Walls, Gates And Railings				56°13′28″N 3°05′33″W	Category B	42971	Upload Photo
Coaltown Of Balgonie, 88 Main Street, East House With Outbuildings, Boundary Wall, Gatepiers, Gates And Railings				56°11′03″N 3°07′49″W	Category B	42973	Upload Photo
Coaltown Of Balgonie, Balgonie Cottage With Outbuilding				56°11′28″N 3°07′20″W	Category C(S)	42978	Upload Photo
Milton Of Balgonie, Lydiard				56°11′41″N 3°05′02″W	Category B	42989	Upload Photo
Thornton, Main Street, Crown Hotel				56°09′51″N 3°08′44″W	Category C(S)	42994	Upload Photo
Thornton, Park Place War Memorial				56°09′55″N 3°08′41″W	Category C(S)	42998	Upload Photo
Windygates, Cameron House With Boundary Wall And Pier				56°11′11″N 3°03′13″W	Category B	43009	Upload Photo
Windygates, Station Road, Mariposa And Monrepos With Boundary Walls, Piers, Railings And Gates				56°11′31″N 3°03′15″W	Category C(S)	43017	Upload Photo
27 Balbirnie Street With Boundary Wall				56°12′12″N 3°08′09″W	Category C(S)	42930	Upload Photo
Balbirnie Street And Commercial Street, Royal Bank Of Scotland With Boundary Walls				56°12′13″N 3°08′08″W	Category C(S)	42935	Upload Photo
Betson Street, Town Hall, Gatepiers And Railings				56°12′08″N 3°08′05″W	Category C(S)	42942	Upload Photo
2 High Street And 1 Mitchell Place				56°12′06″N 3°07′53″W	Category C(S)	42946	Upload Photo
High Street And Union Street, The Town House				56°12′06″N 3°07′55″W	Category C(S)	42949	Upload Photo
Balbirnie Park, West Lodge With Boundary Walls				56°12′23″N 3°09′39″W	Category B	16654	Upload Photo
Carriston Dovecot				56°13′26″N 3°05′27″W	Category B	16662	Upload Photo
Newton Farmhouse With Outbuilding And Boundary Wall				56°12′44″N 3°08′09″W	Category B	16663	Upload Photo
Coul Mains With Boundary Walls				56°12′57″N 3°09′43″W	Category B	16668	Upload Photo
Balbirnie Park, Balbirnie Stables With Boundary Wall				56°12′29″N 3°08′43″W	Category B	16688	Upload Photo
Balbirnie Park, South Lodge With Gatepiers, Gates, Railings And Boundary Walls				56°12′13″N 3°08′22″W	Category B	16689	Upload Photo
Brunton Walled Garden				56°12′20″N 3°07′17″W	Category B	42970	Upload Photo
Coaltown Of Balgonie, Balgonie Cottage, Steading				56°11′27″N 3°07′18″W	Category B	42979	Upload Photo
Coaltown Road, Former United Presbyterian Manse With Boundary Walls				56°11′56″N 3°07′49″W	Category C(S)	42981	Upload Photo
Middle Mill And Middle Mill Cottages				56°11′48″N 3°08′19″W	Category B	42986	Upload Photo
Thornton, Main Street, Old Parish Church With Boundary Walls				56°09′56″N 3°08′47″W	Category C(S)	42995	Upload Photo
Windygates, Haughmill Lane, Primrose Bank With Outbuilding And Boundary Wall				56°11′31″N 3°03′17″W	Category C(S)	43013	Upload Photo
Woodlands House With Boundary Wall				56°11′58″N 3°07′44″W	Category C(S)	43019	Upload Photo
32 And 34 Balbirnie Street				56°12′13″N 3°08′09″W	Category C(S)	42931	Upload Photo
Balbirnie Street And Betson Street, Laurel Bank Hotel With Boundary Walls				56°12′12″N 3°08′07″W	Category C(S)	42934	Upload Photo
Balgonie Road And Mitchell Terrace, Markinch Railway Station With Gatepiers, Boundary Walls And Railings				56°12′04″N 3°07′51″W	Category B	42936	Upload another image See more images
2 And 4 King Edward Street With Boundary Walls				56°12′00″N 3°08′03″W	Category C(S)	42951	Upload Photo
Northall Road, Burnside Cottage With Boundary Walls And Gate				56°12′27″N 3°07′49″W	Category B	42955	Upload Photo
Balbirnie Park, Walled Garden				56°12′28″N 3°08′39″W	Category B	42964	Upload Photo
Kirk Street And School Street, Galloway Inn				56°12′21″N 3°08′05″W	Category B	37651	Upload Photo
13 And 15 School Street With Boundary Wall				56°12′22″N 3°08′03″W	Category C(S)	37654	Upload Photo
High Street, Brunton Court, Former United Free Church With Boundary Walls				56°12′10″N 3°07′58″W	Category C(S)	37673	Upload Photo
Balbirnie Street, United Presbyterian Church				56°12′12″N 3°08′16″W	Category B	37675	Upload Photo
6 And 7 Gateside With Boundary Wall				56°13′15″N 3°09′18″W	Category C(S)	16682	Upload Photo
Windygates, Cameron Hospital, Haig House With Outbuilding Boundary Wall And Railings				56°11′15″N 3°03′25″W	Category B	16684	Upload another image
Markinch Railway Viaduct				56°11′48″N 3°07′56″W	Category B	16685	Upload Photo
Coaltown Of Balgonie, Main Street, Balgonie Arms With Boundary Wall				56°11′06″N 3°07′35″W	Category C(S)	42975	Upload Photo
Duniface Farmhouse And Steading, Outbuilding, Boundary Walls, Gatepiers And Gates				56°11′51″N 3°02′38″W	Category B	42982	Upload Photo
Milton Of Balgonie, Balfour Bridge				56°11′34″N 3°05′26″W	Category B	42987	Upload Photo
Milton Of Balgonie, Balfour Walled Garden With Garden House				56°11′25″N 3°05′38″W	Category B	42988	Upload another image See more images
Thornton, Main Street And Park Place No 60 And Royal Bank With Boundary Walls				56°09′55″N 3°08′44″W	Category C(S)	42997	Upload Photo
Thornton, 40 Station Road With Boundary Wall				56°10′02″N 3°08′37″W	Category C(S)	43002	Upload Photo
Windygates, Balcurvie House With Walled Garden, Boundary Walls, Gatepiers And Gates				56°12′00″N 3°03′34″W	Category B	43006	Upload Photo
Windygates, Durie Vale, Gatepiers And Quadrant Walls				56°11′35″N 3°03′03″W	Category B	43011	Upload Photo
15 Commercial Street And Antique Shop With Outbuilding And Boundary Wall				56°12′15″N 3°08′09″W	Category C(S)	42944	Upload Photo
1, 2 And 3 Balfarg Cottages With Boundary Wall				56°13′02″N 3°09′15″W	Category C(S)	42965	Upload Photo
Kirk Brae, St Drostan's Parish Church				56°12′18″N 3°08′03″W	Category A	37644	Upload another image See more images
Kirk Brae, St Drostan's Parish Church Session House				56°12′19″N 3°08′04″W	Category B	37646	Upload Photo
7 Kirk Street With Boundary Wall				56°12′20″N 3°08′04″W	Category C(S)	37649	Upload Photo
2, 2A And 4-10 (Even Nos) Croft Road				56°12′18″N 3°08′08″W	Category C(S)	37656	Upload Photo
1 Stobcross Road				56°12′21″N 3°08′07″W	Category C(S)	37667	Upload Photo
Coul Farmhouse				56°13′06″N 3°10′13″W	Category B	16655	Upload Photo
Balgonie Policies, Walled Garden				56°11′36″N 3°06′49″W	Category B	16665	Upload Photo
Balgonie Policies, Turbine House				56°11′42″N 3°06′45″W	Category B	42969	Upload Photo
Windygates, Cross, Clock				56°11′33″N 3°03′15″W	Category C(S)	43010	Upload Photo
Windygates, Durie Vale House With Boundary Wall				56°11′34″N 3°03′02″W	Category B	43012	Upload Photo
Windygates, Milton Road And Haughmill Lane, West View And Newsagent With Boundary Wall, Gatepiers				56°11′33″N 3°03′18″W	Category C(S)	43015	Upload Photo
Windygates, Milton Road And Kennoway Road, Windygates Hotel With Outbuildings, Boundary Wall And Gatepiers				56°11′34″N 3°03′16″W	Category C(S)	43016	Upload Photo
Balbirnie Street, War Memorial With Boundary Walls				56°12′12″N 3°08′04″W	Category B	42933	Upload Photo
2 Betson Street And 29 Balbirnie Street				56°12′13″N 3°08′08″W	Category C(S)	42937	Upload Photo
12, 14, And 16 Betson Street, Including Post Office				56°12′11″N 3°08′08″W	Category C(S)	42938	Upload Photo
Betson Street, Markinch Centre With Boundary Walls And Lamp				56°12′10″N 3°08′08″W	Category B	42940	Upload Photo
72, 74 And 74A, 76, 78 High Street				56°12′13″N 3°07′58″W	Category C(S)	42947	Upload Photo
Victoria Road, Morven With Outbuilding And Boundary Wall				56°12′03″N 3°08′06″W	Category C(S)	42956	Upload Photo
Balbirnie Park, Gamekeeper's Cottage With Boundary Walls				56°12′40″N 3°08′23″W	Category C(S)	42962	Upload Photo
Balfarg Farmhouse With Boundary Walls				56°12′58″N 3°09′19″W	Category C(S)	42966	Upload Photo
13 Kirk Street, Kirkstyle				56°12′19″N 3°08′04″W	Category C(S)	37647	Upload Photo
9 School Street, Old Schoolhouse With Boundary Walls				56°12′22″N 3°08′04″W	Category C(S)	37652	Upload Photo
Milton Of Balgonie, Balgonie Bridge				56°11′30″N 3°06′06″W	Category B	16666	Upload Photo
Milton Of Balgonie, Main Street, Church Of Scotland Church With Graveyard, Boundary Walls, Gatepiers And Gates				56°11′39″N 3°05′34″W	Category B	16667	Upload another image
Alburne Park, Balbirnie Bridge				56°12′01″N 3°09′08″W	Category B	15045	Upload Photo
Balgonie Policies, Gatepiers And Boundary Walls				56°11′34″N 3°06′29″W	Category C(S)	42968	Upload Photo
Coaltown Of Balgonie, 48 Main Street				56°11′05″N 3°07′36″W	Category C(S)	42972	Upload Photo
Coaltown Of Balgonie, Barrel Brig				56°10′21″N 3°07′00″W	Category B	42980	Upload Photo
Little Lun With Boundary Wall And Gatepiers				56°11′09″N 3°04′11″W	Category B	42985	Upload Photo
Northall Cemetery With Gravestones, Boundary Walls And Gates				56°12′34″N 3°07′46″W	Category C(S)	42991	Upload Photo
Thornton, Main Street And Chewton Road, The Clock Shop				56°09′58″N 3°08′47″W	Category C(S)	42996	Upload Photo
Thornton, Spittal Farm With Steading And Boundary Walls				56°09′58″N 3°07′58″W	Category C(S)	42999	Upload Photo
Woodbank With Boundary Wall, Gatepiers And Gates				56°10′37″N 3°04′05″W	Category B	43018	Upload Photo
Balbirnie Park, Balbirnie Mains Farm, Dairy With Pavilion And Boundary Walls				56°12′39″N 3°09′07″W	Category C(S)	42961	Upload Photo
11 Kirk Street				56°12′20″N 3°08′04″W	Category C(S)	37648	Upload Photo
30 Commercial Street, Radnor House With Boundary Walls, Gates And Gatepiers				56°12′17″N 3°08′07″W	Category B	37663	Upload Photo
5 Stobcross Road, The Cottage With Boundary Walls				56°12′22″N 3°08′07″W	Category C(S)	37668	Upload Photo
Coul Steadings, Nos 4, 5, 6 And 7				56°13′06″N 3°10′13″W	Category C(S)	16656	Upload Photo
Pyeston Dovecot				56°13′37″N 3°06′17″W	Category B	16661	Upload Photo
Balbirnie Park, Balbirnie House With Sundial, Garden Seat, Boundary Wall, Gatepier And Gate				56°12′34″N 3°08′46″W	Category A	16687	Upload Photo
Glenrothes, Woodside Road, St Margaret's Parish Church				56°11′22″N 3°09′10″W	Category C(S)	42983	Upload Photo
Tullis Russell Paper Mills, Rothes House With Conservatory And Boundary Walls				56°12′03″N 3°09′26″W	Category B	43004	Upload Photo
Windygates, Cameron Bridge Distillery, Workshop And General Store				56°11′24″N 3°03′23″W	Category B	43008	Upload Photo
Balbirnie Street, Beechcroft With Outbuilding, Boundary Walls, Gatepiers And Gates				56°12′14″N 3°08′12″W	Category C(S)	42932	Upload Photo
Betson Street And Balgonie Place, Clinic With Boundary Walls And Gatepiers				56°12′05″N 3°08′04″W	Category C(S)	42943	Upload Photo
High Street, Brunton Manse With Outbuildings And Boundary Walls				56°12′09″N 3°08′01″W	Category C(S)	42948	Upload Photo
Kirk Wynd, The Old Manse With Outbuilding, Boundary Walls, Gatepiers And Gates				56°12′18″N 3°08′00″W	Category B	42953	Upload Photo
2 Kirk Street With Boundary Wall				56°12′20″N 3°08′05″W	Category C(S)	37650	Upload Photo
11 And 11A School Street With Boundary Wall				56°12′23″N 3°08′05″W	Category B	37653	Upload Photo
41 And 43 Commercial Street				56°12′20″N 3°08′08″W	Category B	37661	Upload Photo
Commercial Street And 1 And 3 Gibbs Close, House At Corner With Boundary Wall				56°12′18″N 3°08′07″W	Category B	37664	Upload Photo
Balgonie Castle With Curtain Walls, Boundary Walls, Gatepiers And Well				56°11′38″N 3°06′34″W	Category A	16664	Upload another image See more images
Glenrothes, Warout Road, St Paul's Roman Catholic Church With Presbytery And Boundary Walls				56°11′29″N 3°09′37″W	Category A	10012	Upload Photo
Coaltown Of Balgonie, Main Street, Victoria Hall With Boundary Wall, Gates And Railings				56°11′06″N 3°07′30″W	Category C(S)	42976	Upload Photo
Coaltown Of Balgonie, School Street, Primary School With Outbuilding				56°11′10″N 3°07′41″W	Category C(S)	42977	Upload Photo
Balbirnie Estate, Kirkforthar Farmhouse With Boundary Walls				56°13′54″N 3°07′38″W	Category C(S)	42984	Upload Photo
Milton Of Balgonie, 54 Main Street, Milton House With Gatepiers And Boundary Walls				56°11′37″N 3°05′45″W	Category C(S)	42990	Upload Photo
Thornton, 17 Main Street				56°09′52″N 3°08′44″W	Category C(S)	42993	Upload Photo
Windygates, Milton Road, The Auld Hoose With Boundary Walls, Gatepiers And Gates And Wrought-Iron Sign				56°11′34″N 3°03′23″W	Category C(S)	43014	Upload Photo
Betson Street, Primary School With Boundary Walls, Gatepiers, Gates And Railings				56°12′05″N 3°08′07″W	Category B	42941	Upload Photo
Haig Business Park, Bonded Warehouse				56°11′58″N 3°07′56″W	Category B	42945	Upload Photo
Northall Road, Brunton Bridge				56°12′23″N 3°07′49″W	Category C(S)	42954	Upload Photo
Alburne Park, Levenbank With Outbuilding, Gate, Gatepiers And Boundary Wallsalburne Park, Levenbank With Outbuilding, Gate, Gatepiers And Boundary Walls				56°11′56″N 3°09′02″W	Category B	42957	Upload Photo
45 Commercial Street, Hunterville With Boundary Walls And Railings				56°12′21″N 3°08′06″W	Category C(S)	37662	Upload Photo
27 High Street With Railings				56°12′09″N 3°07′56″W	Category C(S)	37672	Upload Photo
Windygates, Cameron Hospital, Lodge House With Gatepiers				56°11′09″N 3°03′16″W	Category C(S)	43383	Upload Photo
Coaltown Of Balgonie, 90 Main Street With Boundary Wall, Gates And Railings				56°11′02″N 3°07′50″W	Category B	42974	Upload Photo
Thornton, Beam-Engine House				56°09′46″N 3°08′30″W	Category A	42992	Upload another image
Windygates, Balcurvie Road, Church Of Scotland Church With Boundary Walls, Gatepiers And Railings				56°11′36″N 3°03′23″W	Category C(S)	43007	Upload Photo
Kirk Street, Church Hall				56°12′19″N 3°08′05″W	Category C(S)	42952	Upload Photo
Balbirnie Park, Balbirnie Burn Bridge				56°12′42″N 3°09′05″W	Category C(S)	42960	Upload Photo
Balbirnie Park, Lodge At Stob Cross With Gatepier And Boundary Walls				56°12′27″N 3°08′11″W	Category C(S)	42963	Upload Photo
Balgonie Policies, Gardener's Cottage With Outbuilding And Boundary Walls				56°11′38″N 3°06′45″W	Category C(S)	42967	Upload Photo
Kirk Brae, St Drostan's Parish Church Graveyard With Boundary Walls Gates And Railings				56°12′18″N 3°08′02″W	Category B	37645	Upload Photo
Kirk Wynd, Mansefield With Outbuilding And Boundary Wall				56°12′21″N 3°08′00″W	Category B	37655	Upload Photo
33 Commercial Street				56°12′19″N 3°08′08″W	Category C(S)	37660	Upload Photo
42 Commercial Street With Boundary Walls				56°12′19″N 3°08′07″W	Category C(S)	37666	Upload Photo
Windygates, Cameron Bridge				56°11′18″N 3°03′12″W	Category B	16683	Upload Photo
Balbirnie Railway Viaduct				56°11′53″N 3°08′45″W	Category B	16686	Upload Photo
Church Street, Ex Terra				56°11′43″N 3°10′13″W	Category B	51794	Upload another image
North Street, The Birds				56°11′50″N 3°10′29″W	Category C(S)	51795	Upload another image

== Key ==
The scheme for classifying buildings in Scotland is:

- Category A: "buildings of national or international importance, either architectural or historic; or fine, little-altered examples of some particular period, style or building type."
- Category B: "buildings of regional or more than local importance; or major examples of some particular period, style or building type, which may have been altered."
- Category C: "buildings of local importance; lesser examples of any period, style, or building type, as originally constructed or moderately altered; and simple traditional buildings which group well with other listed buildings."

In March 2016 there were 47,288 listed buildings in Scotland. Of these, 8% were Category A, and 50% were Category B, with the remaining 42% being Category C.

== See also ==
- List of listed buildings in Fife
