= Richard Gordon (broadcaster) =

Scottish broadcaster

Richard Gordon (born 1960) is a Scottish radio and television presenter.

Gordon was born in Aberdeen and educated at Skene Square Primary, Aberdeen Grammar School and Aberdeen College of Commerce. He originally worked as a banker before beginning his first job in radio at Northsound Radio in 1987.

He was the host of BBC Radio Scotland's football programme Sportsound from 1992 until 2022, and hosted the Scottish Premier League highlights on Sportscene from 2008 to 2010. Gordon also occasionally presented MacAulay and Co on Radio Scotland when usual presenter Fred MacAulay was unavailable.

He is a supporter of Aberdeen F.C. and has regularly contributed to their matchday programme. He also writes for The Press and Journal.

In June 2022, Gordon was announced as the new head of communications for Cove Rangers.
