= Sportsound =

Sports show on BBC Radio Scotland

Sportsound is BBC Radio Scotland's main radio sports show. It provides coverage to listeners on medium wave, FM, DAB Digital Radio and via the internet. It is best known for its exclusive live commentary of Scottish Premiership football games. It is broadcast seven days a week, and on on-match days has an 1810–2200 slot on 810 MW. On Saturdays, at least two matches are broadcast by MW, and the main FM frequency with the Open All Mics feature broadcast on the BBC Radio nan Gàidheal frequency and the remaining matches online where the other matches are simulcast.

== Presenters ==
- Richard Gordon (host of most live matches and Saturday's Open All Mics programme)
- Kenny Macintyre (host of Monday night show)
- Geoff Webster (host of live rugby and Sunday show)
- David Currie (midweek host)

== Commentators and pitchside ==
- Rob MacLean (main commentator)
- Paul Mitchell
- Liam McLeod
- John Barnes
- Alisdair Lamont
- Chick Young
- Scott Davie
- Chris McLaughlin
- Jane Lewis
- Charlie Mann
- Charles Bannerman
- Brian McLauchlin
- Martin Dowden
- Sandra Brown
- David McDaid
- Amy Canavan

== Analysts ==
- Michael Stewart
- Willie Miller
- Derek Ferguson
- Murdo MacLeod
- Craig Paterson
- Allan Preston
- Kenny Miller
- Steven Thompson
- James McFadden
- John Robertson
- Tom English
- Michael Grant (Herald Scotland)
- Graham Spiers (Herald Scotland)
- Richard Wilson

Additionally, former managers, assistant managers and players can be heard as guest analysts.

== Former presenters ==
- Brian Marjoribanks (original host)
- Tom Ferrie
- Derek Rae
- Roy Small
- Roddy Forsyth

== Former commentators and analysts ==
- David Begg
- Alastair Alexander
- Jock Brown
- David Francey
- Roddy Forsyth
- Donald Garden
- Jim Traynor
- Derek Rae
- Gordon Smith
- Billy Dodds

== Player of the Year Award ==
At the end of the Scottish football season, the player in the Scottish Premier League who has accumulated the most man-of-the match awards from the league season is awarded the Sportsound Player of the Year.

Award	Season	Player	Club	Ref
BBC Radio Scotland Sportsound Player of the Year	2005–06	Russell Anderson	Aberdeen	
BBC Radio Scotland Sportsound Player of the Year	2006–07	Scott McDonald	Motherwell	
BBC Radio Scotland Sportsound Player of the Year	2007–08	Aiden McGeady	Celtic	
BBC Radio Scotland Sportsound Player of the Year	2008–09	Pedro Mendes	Rangers	
BBC Radio Scotland Sportsound Player of the Year	2009–10	Dougie Imrie	Hamilton Academcal	
