= Lynebank Hospital =

- NHS Fife
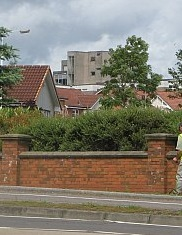
- The distinctive concrete tower of Lynebank Hospital, just visible over the rooftops

- Shown in Fife

Geography
- Location: Halbeath Road, Dunfermline, Fife, Scotland
- Coordinates: 56.0776°N 3.4128°W

Organisation
- Care system: NHS Scotland
- Type: Specialist

Services
- Speciality: Learning disabilities

History
- Founded: 1969

Links
- Lists: Hospitals in Scotland

Lynebank Hospital is a health facility in Halbeath Road, Dunfermline, Scotland. It is managed by NHS Fife.

== History ==
The facility, which was designed by Alison & Hutchison & Partners, was officially opened by Princess Alexandra in May 1969. It was established as a specialist hospital for people with learning disabilities. In 2017 NHS Fife entered into a development agreement with Barratt Developments to develop a large part of the site for residential use. The amount of land earmarked for development has since been extended.
