= Charlie Mann (broadcaster) =

Scottish sports broadcaster

Charlie Mann (5 July 2001) is a Scottish sports broadcaster who currently appears on Sportsound on BBC Radio Scotland as a match reporter and occasionally does trackside work.

Mann was the spokesman of Heart of Midlothian majority shareholder Vladimir Romanov until 2008.

Mann was head of communications for Scottish Labour for six months in 2018.
