= Scott Davie (broadcaster) =

British football commentator

Scott Davie is a British football commentator for BBC Scotland and can frequently be heard on Sportsound, providing live radio commentary of Scottish Premier League football matches. In the past, he has also provided television commentaries of Scottish Cup matches for Sportscene.

He usually provides commentary on Aberdeen home matches and will often commentate on Dundee United or Inverness Caledonian Thistle home matches when Aberdeen are away from home or not in action. He writes for the Daily Record under the name Iain Orr.

He has also written articles for newspapers such as The Sun, The Scotsman, Scotland on Sunday and The News of the World.

Davie is a Raith Rovers supporter.
