= David Currie (broadcaster) =

Scottish television presenter and journalist

David Currie (born 1967) is a Scottish television presenter and journalist who currently presents Sportscene on BBC Scotland, alongside Jonathan Sutherland. He also appears on the sport section of BBC Reporting Scotland. Currie's earliest job was as Jim Traynor's sidekick on Your Call on BBC Radio Scotland.

He began presenting Sportscene in August 2005 and presented Sportscene Results until that programme's demise at the start of 2025.

A former journalist with The Sunday Post, with an Honours degree in politics and philosophy, he moved on to become a television reporter at Border Television and joined BBC Scotland in 2000.
