= NHS Fife =

Healthcare board in Fife, Scotland

- Type: NHS board
- Established: 2004
- Headquarters: Hayfield Road; Kirkcaldy; KY2 5AH
- Region served: Fife
- Hospitals: Adamson Hospital; Cameron Hospital; Glenrothes Hospital; Lynebank Hospital; Queen Margaret Hospital; Randolph Wemyss Memorial Hospital; St Andrews Community Hospital; Stratheden Hospital; Victoria Hospital; Whyteman's Brae Hospital
- Staff: 7,683 (2018/19)
- Website: www.nhsfife.org

NHS Fife (NHS Fife University Health Board, as of July 2025) is an NHS board which provides healthcare services in Fife, Scotland. It is one of the fourteen regions of NHS Scotland.

== Hospitals ==
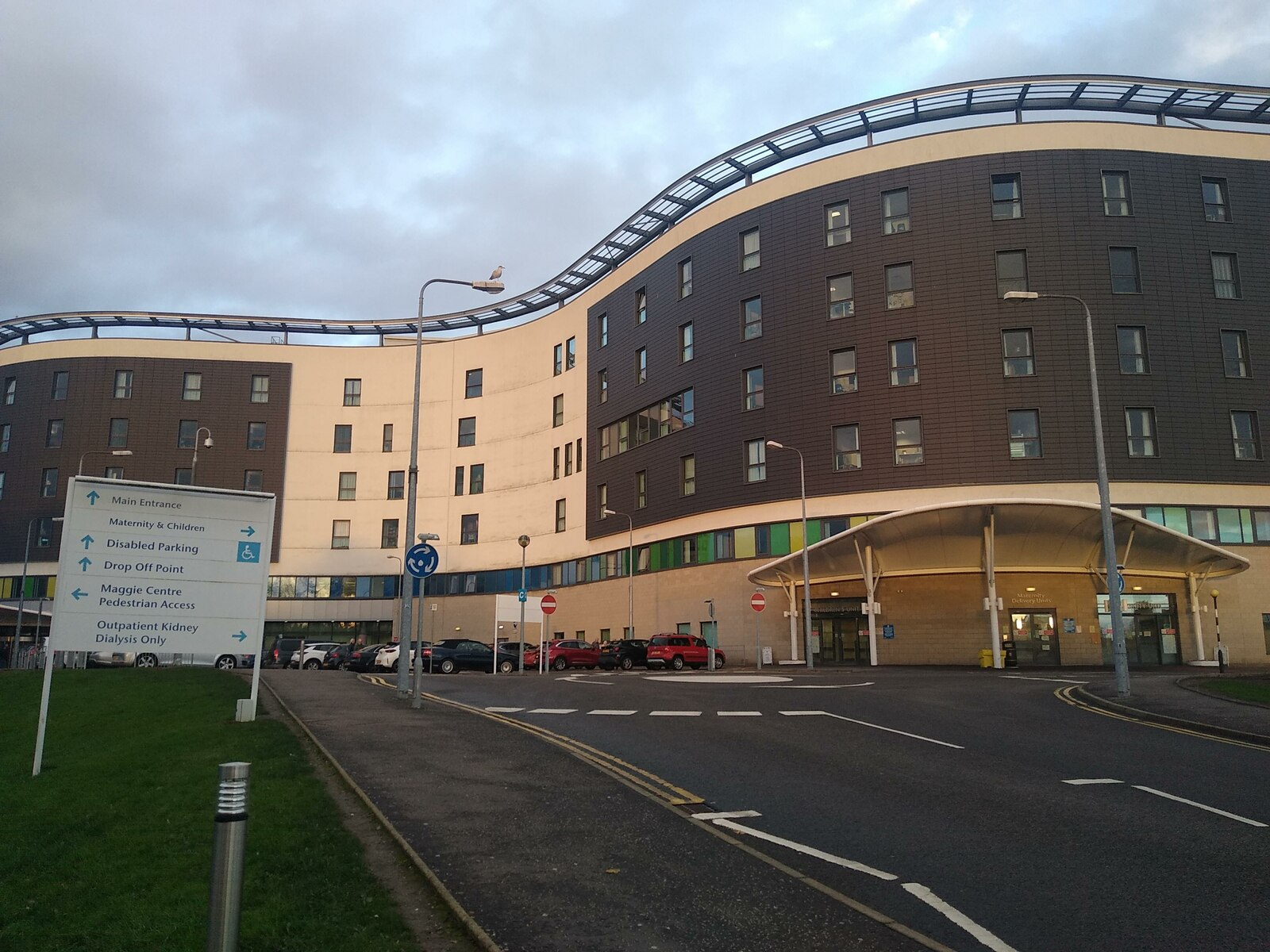
Victoria Hospital in Kirkcaldy, the site of the only A&E department in Fife

The board runs two main hospitals:

- Victoria Hospital in Kirkcaldy
- Queen Margaret Hospital in Dunfermline

It also runs a number of community and day hospitals, including:

- Adamson Hospital in Cupar
- Cameron Hospital in Windygates
- Glenrothes Hospital
- Lynebank Hospital in Dunfermline
- Randolph Wemyss Memorial Hospital in Buckhaven
- St Andrews Community Hospital
- Stratheden Hospital in Cupar
- Whyteman's Brae Hospital in Kirkcaldy

== Finances ==
The board faces an overspend of up to £3.5 million for 2014/5. Financial pressures included the cost of medical locums and bank nurses to fill long-term vacancies in acute services and the impact of new drugs to treat Hepatitis C and Anti-TNF drugs for rheumatology.

In 2019, it was reported that the NHS Fife estate needed £89 million of maintenance to bring the buildings up to acceptable standards, and that this cost had risen by £11.5 million in the last year, primarily due to further deterioration of the tower block at Victoria Hospital.

== Controversies ==
=== Peggie v NHS Fife ===
In 2024, NHS Fife suspended a nurse following an altercation at the Victoria Hospital in which the nurse in question supposedly made comments about a transgender doctor's use of the female changing facilities. The nurse is currently pursuing NHS Fife under the Equality Act 2010. The tribunal, as of June 2025, has cost around £259,000 which NHS Fife is liable to pay £25,000 of. (main article)
