= Victoria Hospital, Kirkcaldy =

Hospital in Kirkcaldy, Fife

Victoria Hospital
- NHS Fife
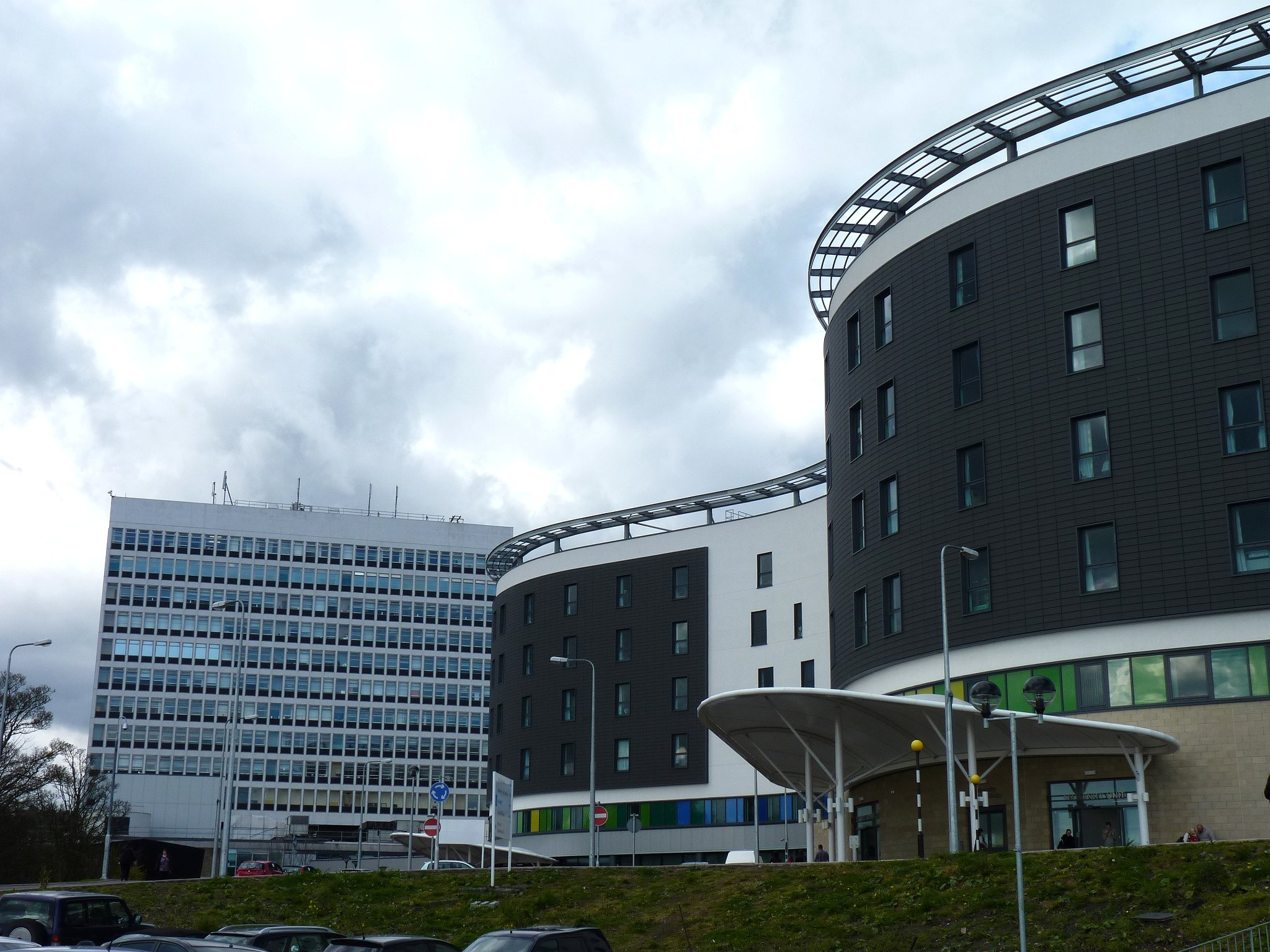
- Old main building (left), 2012 new main building (right)

- Location within Fife

Geography
- Location: Kirkcaldy, Fife, Scotland, United Kingdom
- Coordinates: 56.125°N 3.160°W

Organisation
- Care system: NHS Scotland
- Type: General Hospital
- Affiliated university: University of Dundee School of Medicine; University of Edinburgh Medical School; University of St Andrews School of Medicine

Services
- Emergency department: Yes
- Beds: 458

History
- Founded: 1967

Links
- Website: Official website

Victoria Hospital is a large hospital situated to the north of the town centre in Kirkcaldy, in Fife, Scotland. As one of two main hospitals in Fife, this serves both the town and surrounding Mid-Fife area. It is managed by NHS Fife.

== History ==
The original hospital in the town was a cottage hospital which was situated to the east of the town and which opened in 1890.

After the Second World War, there was demand for a more centralised and bigger hospital to be built in the town to be able to deal with the strains caused by a burgeoning population. The original site proposed for the new hospital was that occupied by the cottage hospital, but a lack of space for the expansion caused the plans to be abandoned. A site was eventually chosen around the local sanatorium and fever hospital. Construction of the new Victoria Hospital began in 1955 and was completed in 1967.

The hospital was threatened with the possible loss of its accident and emergency department in 2005. These services were to be moved to Queen Margaret Hospital in Dunfermline but the proposal was withdrawn after severe criticism.

A major new wing to the south of the current tower block was procured under a Private Finance Initiative contract in 2009. The new wing included 500 beds together with eleven operating theatres and a new accident and emergency department. The area surrounding the hospital was altered to include signal controlled junctions, a new mini-roundabout and new car parking spaces at both the north and south ends of the hospital. The works, which were designed by the Building Design Partnership and undertaken by Balfour Beatty at a cost of £170 million, were completed in summer 2012.

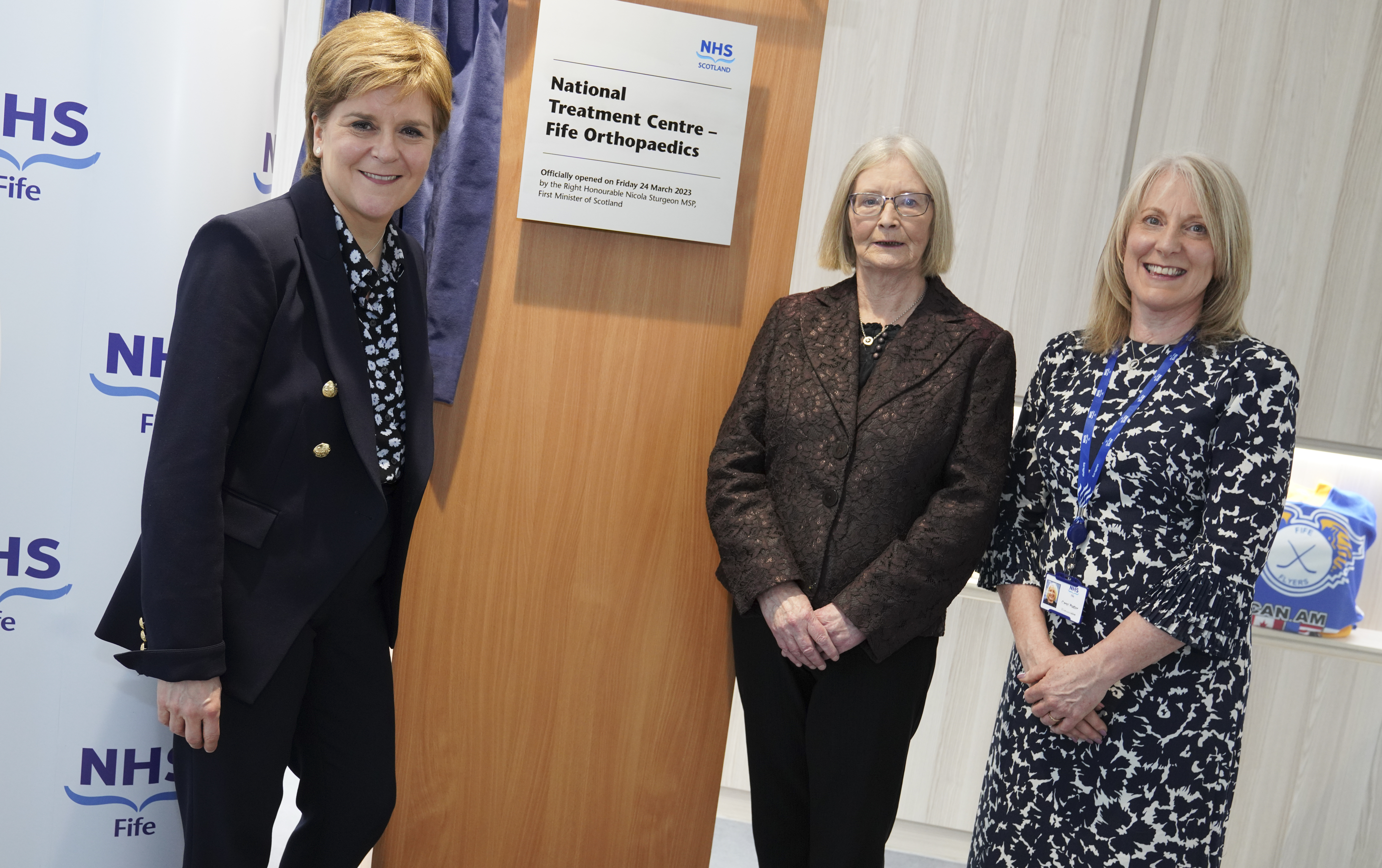
Nicola Sturgeon's last day as First Minister - opening of new treatment facility 24 March 2023

The new wing was opened in August 2012 by Nicola Sturgeon, although services had transferred to the new wing in three separate phases. Initially several services based on the Victoria site had relocated there in December 2011. Services then transferred across from Forth Park Hospital, Kirkcaldy, in January 2012, followed in the same month by a number of services from Queen Margaret Hospital, Dunfermline. From January 2012, all of Fife's accident and emergency services were located at the Victoria Hospital.

Two of the hospital's buildings received listed status in 2022 for their special historic and architectural interest: the mid-1950s Phase I block was designated Category C and the early-1960s Phase II block was designated Category B. Nicola Sturgeon's last day as First Minister on 24 March 2023 was spent at Victoria Hospital where she opened a new national treatment facility for orthopaedic surgery accompanied by the Fife NHS CEO Carol Potter. The new £33m facilities included three new operating theatres.

== Services ==
The hospital consists of three wings: East, West and South and a main tower block. An adjacent Maggie's Centre is also located within the grounds. In 2012 a new wing opened, which includes a new accident and emergency department; maternity unit and eleven new operating theatres.

The hospital provides many facilities for the catchment area including an accident and emergency department, ear, nose and throat (ENT) unit, anaesthesia, obstetrics and gynaecology, paediatric surgery, mental health services, infectious diseases and operating theatres. Whyteman's Brae Hospital which is part of the complex caters for psychiatry and elderly patients.

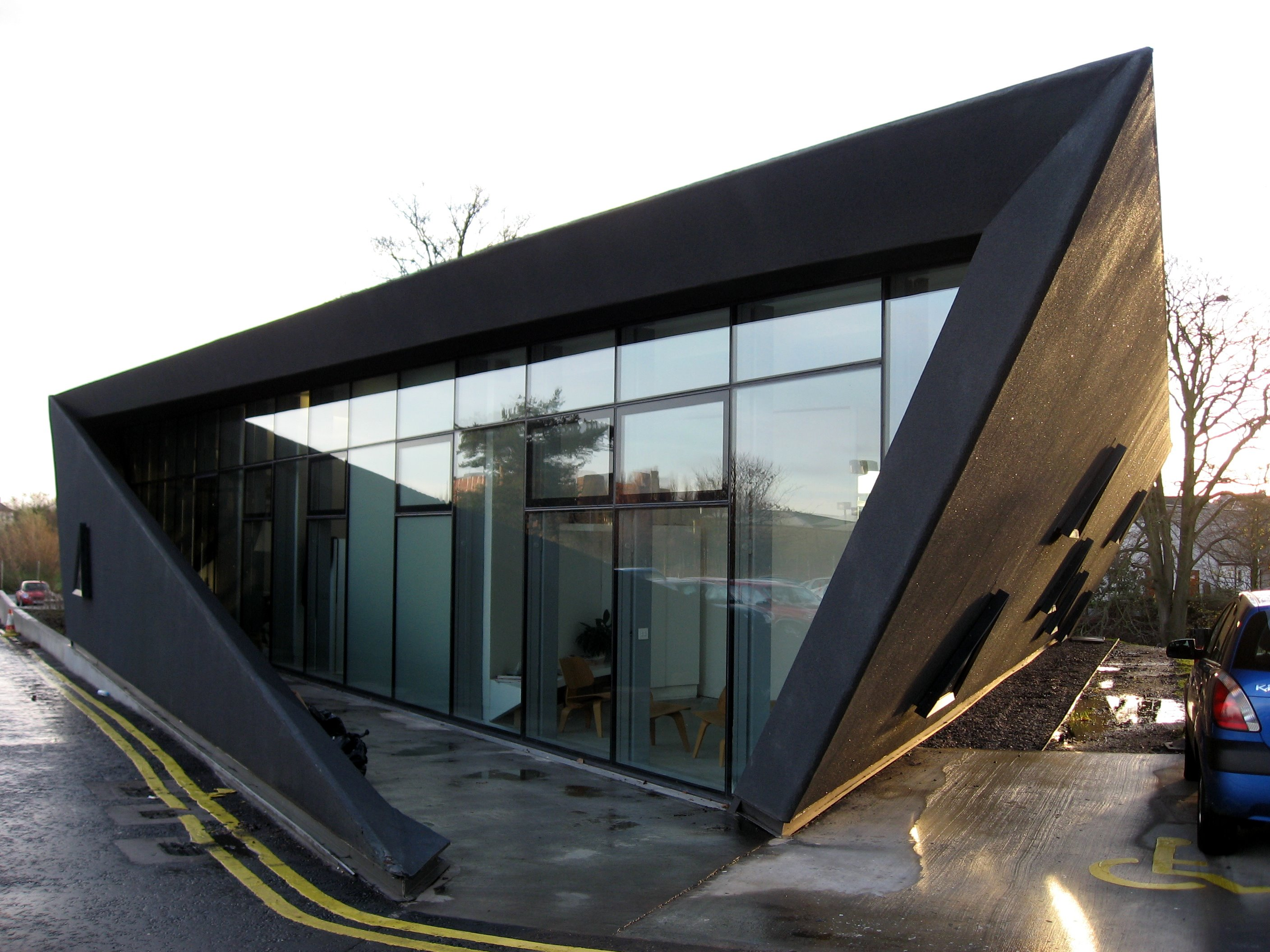
Maggie's Centre, Kirkcaldy

The hospital also has an adjacent Maggie's Centre to support people who are diagnosed with cancer. Known as Maggie's Fife, it opened in November 2006. The centre, which is a single storey building shaped like a prism, was designed by Zaha Hadid, and was her first completed building in the United Kingdom. It was shortlisted for the Scottish Design Awards. The money for the project was raised via the Fife Free Press' Maggie's Appeal.

A radio station known as the Victoria Radio Network (VRN 1287) has been on the air since 1971. VRN is now considered one of the UK's longest running and successful hospital radios still on air. In 2002, the station was awarded a license to broadcast on medium wave 1287 kHz (AM) and transmits 24-hours a day.

== Performance ==
The hospital was criticised after an unannounced Healthcare Environment Inspectorate visit in December 2014 which slammed the "serious nature" of its problems with cleanliness.

The orthopaedic surgery team was praised in October 2016 as among the top performing in Scotland for elective orthopaedic surgery. Rates of cancelled operations were among the best in Scotland. The theatres were the second most efficient in Scotland, with fewer early finishes, late starts and less turnover time between patients. A delegation from the British Orthopaedic Association including Tim Briggs visited in 2015.

== Transport ==
Victoria Hospital is situated to the north of the town centre. There are main bus routes that serve the catchment area for the hospital particularly from Glenrothes, Leven and from the railway station. Bus stances can be found adjacent to the east wing entrance and on the opposite side of the road.
