= Paul Mitchell (broadcaster) =

Scottish football commentator

Paul Mitchell (born 18 December 1968 in Edinburgh) is a Scottish football commentator for BBC Scotland and was their main commentator from 2004 to 2010.

He started with the BBC in 1991 as a football reporter, moving into radio commentary in 1998. His first television commentary appearance was in February 2001, covering the Scottish Cup. Mitchell has covered numerous Scottish Cup Final and League Cup Finals, and has also commentated on a wide range of domestic, European and international matches. In 2007, he covered the under-20 World Cup Finals in Canada. and he has also appeared on Match of the Day. He has also commentated on BBC Radio Scotland's Sportsound programmes, providing live commentary of Scottish Premier League, European football and women's international and Champions League matches. He is also a regular on talkSPORT covering domestic, European and International matches.

Away from football, Mitchell has covered over a dozen different sports and is BBC Scotland's indoor bowls commentator; he has provided commentary on the television coverage of the Scottish International Open since 2006 and was part of the team that provided commentary on the bowls at the Commonwealth Games in Glasgow in 2014 and again in Birmingham in 2022.

Mitchell is also an established Rugby Commentator and has provided radio commentary on the Pro 12/Pro 14, HSBC International 7's, European matches and Scotland international matches. While they held the contract, he also provided English language commentary on BBC Alba's television coverage of the Pro 12. He has also worked on Premier Sports rugby coverage as a commentator and pitchside reporter.

He has also commentated for Radio Scotland for shinty's premier event, the Camanachd Cup final.

Outside sport, he is also a regular contributor to BBC Radio Scotland's Thought for the Day, which is broadcast during Good Morning Scotland on BBC Radio Scotland and has presented music-based programmes. Blog

He presented the Greatest Country Hits show on the Bauer City 2 network across Scotland and England in 2016 and 2017

He supports Hearts. Mitchell is a fan of the NFL and in particular the New Orleans Saints. In 2018 he started a podcast called NFL Scotland, with fellow broadcaster Cameron Hobbs.

Media offices
Preceded by Rob Maclean	Regular football commentator of Sportscene; 2004–2010	Succeeded by Liam McLeod
