= Rob MacLean =

British television presenter (born 1958)

Robin "Rob" MacLean (born 1958 in Invergordon) is a Scottish television presenter, football commentator and sports writer. He currently works for BBC Scotland and TNT Sports.

MacLean began his career with the Highland News Group in Inverness before working for an Aberdeen news agency between 1979 and 1981. He then worked at Northsound Radio for six years before joining BBC Scotland's flagship evening news programme Reporting Scotland in 1986. After two years with Reporting Scotland he left to join STV rivals Scotland Today in 1988.

MacLean returned to BBC Scotland in 1990 where he worked as a presenter for both Reporting Scotland and Sportscene. In 1997, he succeeded Jock Brown as BBC Scotland's main football commentator, a position he held until his departure to Setanta Sports in 2004 as the main anchorman for live coverage of Scottish Premier League matches.

Until Setanta Sports's UK operation ceased trading in June 2009, MacLean was the main anchorman for their live coverage. Following Setanta's demise, he was the main anchor of STV's UEFA Champions League coverage, while also working as a commentator & presenter for BBC Radio Scotland. However, in 2010 he returned to the BBC full-time as the main presenter of Sportscene, and a commentator for BBC Radio Scotland. He has also commentated on Premier League matches for Match of the Day.

From the start of the 2017-18 football season, MacLean appeared on BT Sport's coverage of Scottish football and the UEFA Champions League following the departure of Derek Rae at the end of the 2016–17 season. MacLean has worked as a commentator on matches in the SPFL, Scottish League Cup, and matches in European competition featuring Scottish clubs.

He also hosted the Golf Show, a weekly radio golf magazine show live from St Andrews, on BBC Radio Scotland.

Rob has a wife Pauline, a daughter Lily and a son Hamish.

Media offices
Preceded by Jock Brown	Regular football commentator of Sportscene; 1997–2004	Succeeded by Paul Mitchell
Preceded by Dougie Donnelly	Main presenter of Sportscene; 2010–present	Succeeded by Incumbent
