= David Begg (broadcaster) =

Scottish football commentator

David Begg (born July 1946) is a Scottish retired football and golf commentator. He appeared on Sportsound on BBC Radio Scotland. He was a commentator from 1980 till his retirement at the end of April 2012.
