= Glenrothes Hospital =

- NHS Fife
- Shown in Fife

Geography
- Location: Lodge Rise, Glenrothes, Fife, Scotland
- Coordinates: 56.2051°N 3.1825°W

Organisation
- Care system: NHS Scotland
- Type: General

History
- Founded: 1981

Links
- Lists: Hospitals in Scotland

Glenrothes Hospital is a health facility in Lodge Rise, Glenrothes, Scotland. It is managed by NHS Fife.

== History ==
The facility was built in the early 1980s and officially opened in October 1981. It provides around 60 beds for inpatients and 20 beds within its day hospital facilities. In spring 2018 the hospital was unable to provide out-of-hours services because of staff shortages; this was still an issue in 2019.
