= Randolph Wemyss Memorial Hospital =

- NHS Fife
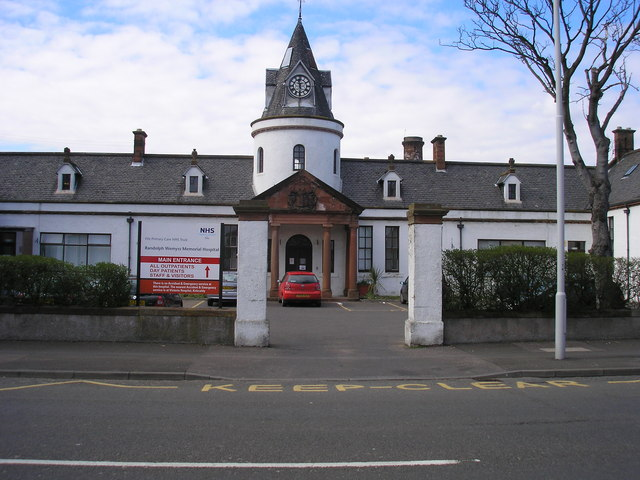
- Randolph Wemyss Memorial Hospital

- Shown in Fife

Geography
- Location: Levenmouth, Fife, Scotland
- Coordinates: 56.1776°N 3.0303°W

Organisation
- Care system: NHS Scotland
- Type: Community Hospital
- Affiliated university: University of Dundee; St Andrews University

Services
- Emergency department: No
- Beds: 16

History
- Founded: 1909

Links
- Website: www.nhsfife.org/randolphwemyss
- Lists: Hospitals in Scotland

Randolph Wemyss Memorial Hospital is a community hospital located in Buckhaven, Fife, managed by NHS Fife.

== History ==
The original hospital was designed by Alexander Tod and opened on 28 August 1909. It was erected in memory of Randolph Wemyss, a local landowner, with his widow Lady Eva Wemyss providing £10,000 for its construction. The hospital initially provided care for local residents and mine workers injured in the coal pits, supported through donations from local businesses, churches, individuals, and directly from the wages of local miners.

In the 1960s, a major extension to the south of the hospital, designed by John Holt, was completed. During the 1990s, general surgery services were transferred to the Victoria Hospital in Kirkcaldy. A review of services was conducted between 2002 and 2004.

The most recent upgrade, costing £4.45 million, was completed and opened by Nicola Sturgeon, MSP and Health Secretary, on 16 June 2008. The new services introduced included a men's health clinic, a sexual health clinic, a Maggie's Centre outreach facility, and integrated paediatric services.

== Services ==
Randolph Wemyss Memorial Hospital serves as a clinical placement location for nursing students from the University of Dundee and also provides teaching facilities for the University of St Andrews. The hospital's Wellesley unit offers care for long-term conditions and end-of-life care through 16 continuing care inpatient beds. Additionally, the hospital hosts a range of community services, including dental services, clinical psychology, community rehabilitation, day care, learning disability services, out-of-hours services, and paediatric physiotherapy.
