= Whyteman's Brae Hospital =

- NHS Fife
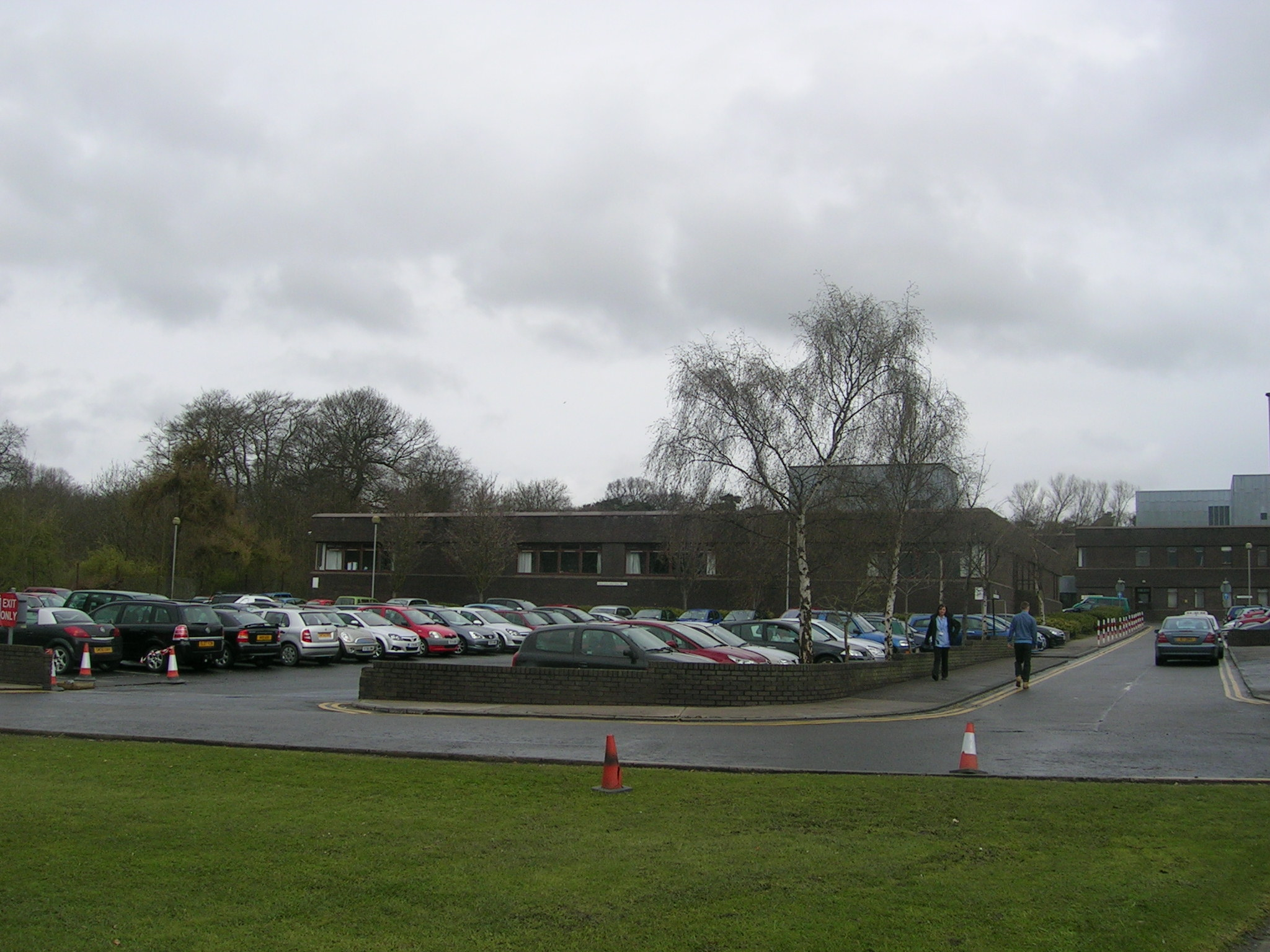
- Whyteman's Brae Hospital

- Shown in Fife

Geography
- Location: Whyteman's Brae, Kirkcaldy, Fife, Scotland
- Coordinates: 56.1281°N 3.1602°W

Organisation
- Care system: NHS Scotland
- Type: Specialist

Services
- Speciality: Psychiatry and elderly patients

History
- Founded: 1983

Links
- Lists: Hospitals in Scotland

Whyteman's Brae Hospital is a health facility in Whyteman's Brae, Kirkcaldy, Scotland. It is managed by NHS Fife.

== History ==
The facility, which provides psychiatry and services for elderly patients, was completed in 1983. A serious outbreak of diarrhea and vomiting, in which three people died, occurred at the hospital in October 2002. In 2018 the hospital started to make the hospital safer by removing sink pipes, door closers and shower taps.
