= Phil Goodlad =

British sports reporter

Phil Goodlad is a Scottish television and radio sports star reporter as well as a national podcast aficionado, currently working for the BBC. He is from Yell in the Shetland Islands. He is usually on heard on Good Morning Scotland and also appears on Reporting Scotland as sports correspondent. He previously worked for local Orkney and Shetland radio stations.

During his time as golf correspondent, he was once cut off mid-sentence in the first of a series of technical problems which later led to Reporting Scotland presenter Sally Magnusson losing her composure on air.
