= Bill McFarlan =

Scottish broadcaster, author, and businessman (b. 1958)

- Born: William Inglis Maitland McFarlan; 31 May 1958 (age 67); Glasgow, Scotland
- Occupations: Broadcaster and businessman
- Years active: 1976–present
- Spouse: Caroline McFarlan (m. 1981)
- Children: Victoria; Emma; Andrew

Bill McFarlan (born 31 May 1958) is a Scottish broadcaster, author, and businessman.

== Biography ==
McFarlan began his journalism career in 1976 with local newspapers, most notably the East Kilbride News, Kilmarnock Standard, Johnstone Advertiser and Paisley Daily Express before joining Radio Clyde in 1980.

He joined the Scotland Today news team at Scottish Television between 1982 and 1985 as a reporter-presenter. By the mid-1980s, McFarlan had become one of the most prominent journalists covering Glasgow's ice cream wars.

Between 1989 and 1991, McFarlan presented BBC show World's Strongest Man. Between 1991 and 1995, he presented sport on BBC Breakfast News from London. He left BBC Scotland in 1993, presenting for Sky Sports between 1995 and 1996.

Some of McFarlan's other media work included fronting The Ibrox Club Hour for Rangers TV in 1997/1998. His final work for television was as a presenter of Scottish football for Setanta from 2002 until 2004.

In 1989, McFarlan founded consultancy firm The Broadcasting Business with BBC colleague Alan Douglas running media training and presentation courses. The company won the rights to run presentation training for the team behind Glasgow's successful bid for the 2014 Commonwealth Games. McFarlan worked specifically with the presentation team of Louise Martin, Glasgow Council Leader Steven Purcell, decathlete Jamie Quarry and First Minister Alex Salmond. McFarlan then flew with the group to Sri Lanka for the final delegate presentation. The consultancy was rebranded to Pink Elephant Communications in 2014.

In 2019, a Freedom of Information request found McFarlan had delivered media training to a number of Scottish Government ministers, including the then Education Secretary Angela Constance, Finance Secretary Derek Mackay, and Justice Secretary Michael Matheson.

McFarlan came out in support of Better Together ahead of the Scottish independence referendum in 2014.

McFarlan has written two books: Drop the Pink Elephant, published in 2003, and Are You Good Enough? in 2006. He has also written columns for The Scotsman and The Herald.

In March 2023, McFarlan retired from Pink Elephant Communications, having delivered over 4,000 seminars in 25 countries across the world.

In October 2023, McFarlan hosted a stage show with fellow broadcaster and long-time friend Eamonn Holmes at Glasgow's Eastwood Theatre. In a BBC Radio Scotland interview, McFarlan said he may have unknowingly suggested the idea of Live Aid to Bob Geldof during a 1984 report for ITN.

== Personal life ==
McFarlan and his wife Caroline were high-profile supporters of the Scottish actor Eric Cullen. McFarlan publicly defended Cullen after child pornography was removed from the actor's home in 1993. It later emerged that Cullen had been the victim of sexual abuse and had been blackmailed by his abusers into storing the material. Cullen's conviction was later quashed.

McFarlan also supported police detective Shirley McKie, who was wrongly accused of leaving her fingerprint at a murder scene. He campaigned for a public inquiry into the mishandling of her case, which was held in 2008. McKie was awarded £750,000 in compensation.
