= Stratheden Hospital =

- NHS Fife
- Entrance to Stratheden Hospital

- Shown in Fife

Geography
- Location: Cupar, Fife, Scotland
- Coordinates: 56.3054°N 3.0549°W

Organisation
- Care system: NHS Scotland
- Type: Community hospital

History
- Founded: 1866

Links
- Website: www.nhsfife.org/stratheden/
- Lists: Hospitals in Scotland

Stratheden Hospital is currently a small community hospital in Stratheden, Cupar, Fife which was originally called Fife and Kinross District Asylum. Its name was changed to Stratheden Hospital in 1948. It was a centre of excellence in Child and Family Psychiatry from the 1960s. In the 21st century, it caters for psychiatric health. It is managed by NHS Fife.

== History ==
=== Early history ===
The hospital opened as the Fife and Kinross District Asylum on 1 July 1866. The first chief physician was John Batty Tuke. The hospital was extended at a cost of £20,000 in 1896. A further two new wings were added in 1905. Following the introduction of the National Health Service (Scotland) Act 1947 the name of the hospital changed to Stratheden Hospital on 7 July 1948.

=== A leading Child and Family Psychiatry Department ===
1960 saw the arrival of Dr Douglas Haldane, an energetic and recently appointed young consultant child psychiatrist. He had the novel idea of calling his department "Child and Family Psychiatry", a name that was to catch on elsewhere. His unit was located at 'Playfield House' and was opened in the grounds of the hospital. As the label implied, it catered for children, adolescents and their families. Eventually, in 1975, two purpose-built buildings were set aside for the in-patient care for whole family groups, along the lines of the Cassel Hospital, south of the border. The other consultant child psychiatrist appointed to the hospital was Dr Simon Lindsay, who had been a trainee of the distinguished child analyst Melanie Klein. Lindsay was said to have been the only direct Kleinian in the whole of Scotland.

=== Recent developments ===
Plans for a new intensive psychiatric care unit (IPCU) at Stratheden were approved in 2014 and construction began in 2015 with funds awarded by Scottish Government. On 6 July 2015 First Minister Nicola Sturgeon joined NHS Fife chief executive Paul Hawkins in a sod-cutting ceremony at Stratheden Hospital and said "The Scottish Government is investing over £2 billion in Scotland’s health infrastructure over the spending review period, with this development being one of many that demonstrate the Scottish Government’s commitment to continually improving health services.” The extension cost £4.4 million and includes a communal lounge, rooms for rehabilitative and therapeutic activities, access to an outdoor courtyard, private meeting rooms for visits from families or visitors, an IT suite and eight new patient en-suite rooms. Hollyview Ward, IPCU, was officially opened by Maureen Watt MSP, Minister for Mental Health, in July 2016.

Hollyview Ward, Intensive Psychiatric Care Unit (IPCU) Stratheden Hospital, Cupar, Fife, 15 May 2016
