= Cameron Hospital =

- NHS Fife
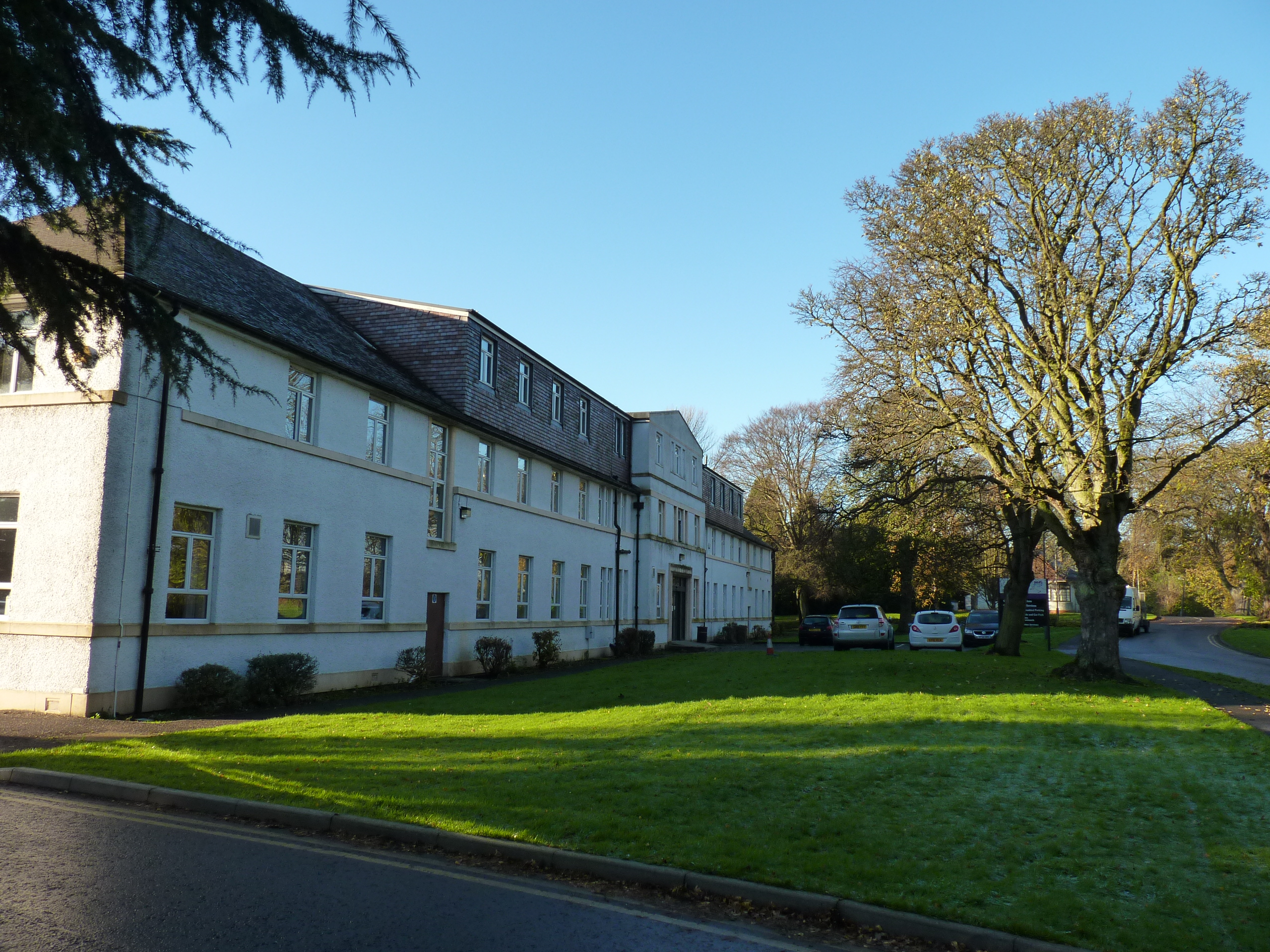
- The 1940 Administration block

- Shown in Fife

Geography
- Location: Cameron Road, Windygates, Fife, Scotland
- Coordinates: 56.1868°N 3.0567°W

Organisation
- Care system: NHS Scotland
- Type: General

History
- Founded: 1912

Links
- Lists: Hospitals in Scotland

Cameron Hospital is a health facility in Cameron Road, Windygates, Fife, Scotland. It is managed by NHS Fife. The original building, known as Haig House, is a Category B listed building.

== History ==
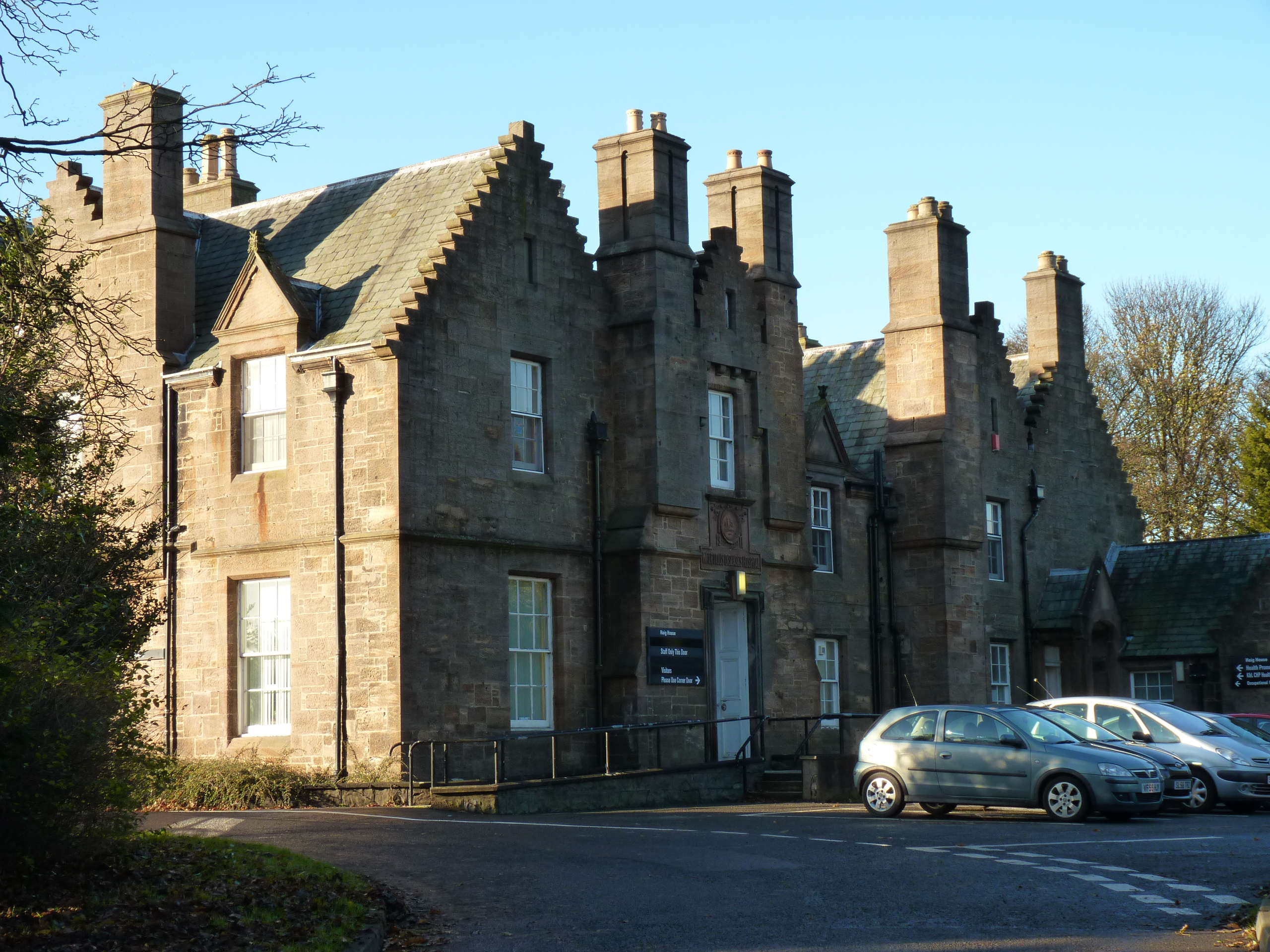
Haig House

Haig House, which was originally commissioned by the distiller John Haig for use as his home, was designed by David Bryce in the Scottish Baronial style and completed in 1849. It later became the family home of Field Marshal Earl Haig, his son.

An infectious diseases hospital was established on the site in 1912 when Haig House was converted into an administration block and ward pavilions were built in the grounds. A new administration block was completed in 1940 at which time Haig House was converted for use as a nurses' home. The building was used as a military hospital during the Second World War before joining the National Health Service as Cameron Hospital in 1948.

A tuberculosis treatment centre was added in 1955 and a 60-bed geriatric block was added in 1963.
