= Dougie Donnelly =

Scottish sports presenter (born 1953)

- Born: Douglas Donnelly; 7 June 1953 (age 73); Glasgow, Scotland
- Occupation: Television sports broadcaster

Douglas Donnelly (born 7 June 1953) is a Scottish television presenter known for presenting sports coverage.

== Career ==
Donnelly was born in Glasgow, where he began his career with Radio Clyde in the 1970s, presenting the top-rated Mid Morning Show from 1979 until 1992. He also presented a "Dougie Donnelly File" show on Sunday evenings from 1987 to August 1988 which reviewed a famous musician/band each week. He was twice voted Scottish Radio Personality of the Year. Towards the end of his time, he mostly presented on Clyde 1 and occasionally presented on Clyde 2.

He joined BBC Scotland's Sports Department in 1978, presenting programmes such as Sportscene Live (which includes events such as the Scottish Cup Final and Scotland internationals), Grandstand from Scotland, Afternoon Sportscene, the network's rugby union coverage and football World Cups in 1990 and 1998. He presented two series of a TV chat show, Friday Night with Dougie Donnelly directed by Martin Cairns, and was TV Personality of the Year in Scotland in 1982. He left the BBC after the 2010 Scottish Cup Final, his 30th in a row, and was lead commentator on European Tour Productions' worldwide live TV coverage of golf's European Tour on the Golf Channel, which involved travelling to around 20 tournaments a year around the world.

Donnelly was known outside Scotland by his involvement in the BBC's networked output of golf, darts, snooker and bowls. He was the first Scot to present the Grandstand programme on the network, which he did on a regular basis between 1992 and 2002. Donnelly also served as commentator/presenter for the World's Strongest Man during the 1980s on ITV.

He covered four Commonwealth Games, four Summer Olympic Games and three Winter Olympic Games. In the 2002 Winter Olympics at Salt Lake City, he commentated on the British women curlers' Gold victory. He has also hosted quiz shows on radio and TV and has appeared on The Weakest Link, Ready Steady Cook, Banzai and The Games.

In February 2016, it was announced that Donnelly would become a columnist for bunkered golf magazine, writing a column in every edition.

He is also an after-dinner speaker and awards host.

== Personal life ==
Donnelly was raised in Rutherglen, educated at the former Hamilton Academy and is a graduate of the University of Strathclyde Law School. He was chairman of the Scottish Institute of Sport from 2005 to 2008 and chaired the Scottish Commonwealth Games Endowment Fund. He is a fan of Clyde F.C.

== See also ==
- BBC Scotland
- Sportscene
- Sky Sports
