= Minor injuries unit =

A minor injuries unit (MIU) is a type of walk-in clinic service provided in some hospitals in the United Kingdom. Units are generally staffed by emergency nurse practitioners (ENPs) who can work autonomously to treat minor injuries such as lacerations and fractures. Some units have access to X-ray facilities. There is some consultant input in training and supervision. No appointment is needed, and waiting times are often shorter than for equivalent injuries at emergency departments.

In 1994, a minor injuries unit opened at the Western General Hospital in Edinburgh which was the first nurse-led unit in Scotland. A two-year evaluation showed the service was run at an average cost of £33 per patient visit.
