= Jock Brown =

Scottish football commentator

John Winton Brown (born May 1946) is a Scottish football commentator. He also served as general manager of Scottish club Celtic from 1997 to 1998.

== Early life ==
Brown was born in Kilmarnock in May 1946. He is the younger brother of former Scotland and Aberdeen F.C. manager Craig Brown. His other brother Bob was the Minister at Queen's Cross Parish Church in Aberdeen from 1984 until his retirement in 2008.

He was a supporter of Hamilton Academical as a child, attended the former Hamilton Academy and played in the school's football teams. He later graduated in law from Sidney Sussex College, Cambridge. He is a Cambridge University football Blue, having played three times against Oxford at Wembley, captaining the team on the third occasion.

== Legal career ==
Brown is a solicitor by profession. He was a partner with Brodies LLP until 2010, and subsequently a consultant there until he retired in 2016.

== Broadcasting ==
Brown started his broadcasting career for BBC Radio Scotland before moving to Scottish Television where he became the main commentator between 1980 and 1990. He then joined BBC Scotland where he stayed until 1997. He has also commentated for Sky Sports, Setanta Sports, NTL, ITV on Digital, and News UK Ltd.

== Celtic ==
In 1997, he was appointed General Manager of Celtic by Fergus McCann. Brown was involved in bringing Wim Jansen to Celtic as manager. Reports suggested that the pair did not enjoy a harmonious working relationship, culminating in the resignation of Jansen after one successful season. Brown was then involved in the appointment of Josef Venglos. Brown had a controversial time at Celtic, and he resigned in November 1998. He is the author of a book on his time at Celtic called Celtic Minded: 510 Days in Paradise.

== Hamilton Academical ==
On 29th October 2024, he was appointed as Chairman of Hamilton Academical. On 4 November 2025, Brown announced he would be stepping down from his role as Chairman for health reasons.

== Charity ==
From 2013 to 2018 he was chairman of the board of trustees of CU Trust Scotland, which operates Children's University in Scotland; he remains on the board as a trustee.
